= 20th Infantry Regiment "Brescia" =

Inactive Italian Army infantry unit

- 20° Reggimento Fanteria "Brescia"
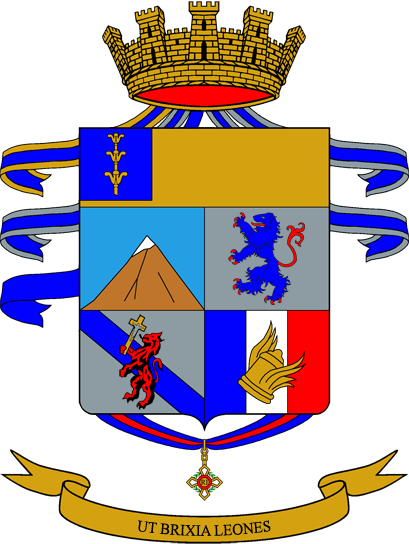
- Regimental coat of arms
- Active: 16 Sept. 1848 – May 1849; 1 Nov. 1859 – 27 Nov. 1942; 31 July – 6 Sept. 1958; 1 Sept. 1975 – 30 April 1991
- Country: Italy
- Branch: Italian Army
- Part of: Mechanized Brigade "Brescia"
- Garrison/HQ: Brescia
- Motto: "Ut Brixia leones"
- Anniversaries: 15 July 1918 – Battle of Vallée de l'Ardre
- Decorations: 2× Military Order of Italy; 1× Gold Medal of Military Valor; 3× Silver Medals of Military Valor; 1× Bronze Medal of Military Valor

Insignia
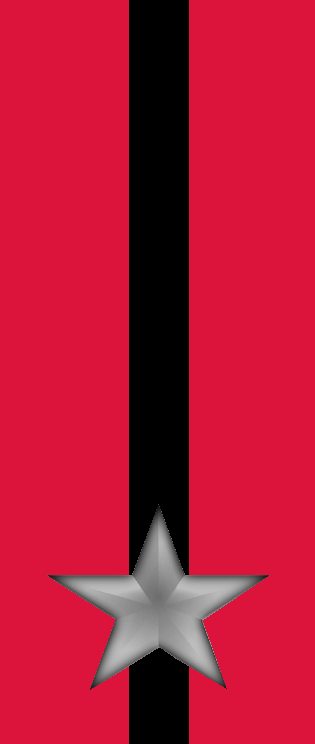
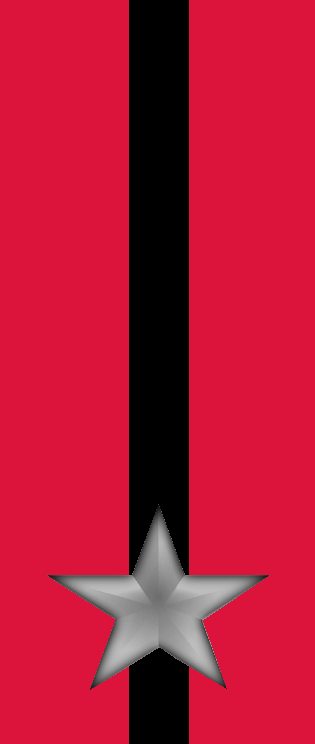
- Regimental gorget patches

The 20th Infantry Regiment "Brescia" (Italian: 20° Reggimento Fanteria "Brescia") is an inactive unit of the Italian Army last based in Brescia in Lombardy. The regiment is named for the city of Brescia and part of the Italian Army's infantry arm. The regiment was formed in 1848 by the Royal Sardinian Army during the First Italian War of Independence. After the war the regiment was disbanded. In 1859, the regiment was reformed after the Kingdom of Sardinia annexed Lombardy after the Second Italian War of Independence. The regiment fought in the Third Italian War of Independence in 1866 and participated in the Capture of Rome in 1870. In 1911–12, the regiment fought in the Italo-Turkish War. During World War I the regiment fought on the Italian front and then on the Western Front.

During World War II, the regiment was assigned to the 27th Infantry Division "Brescia", with which it fought in the Western Desert campaign. In November 1942, the regiment was destroyed during the Second Battle of El Alamein. The regiment was awarded Italy's highest military honor, a Gold Medal of Military Valor, for bravery and valor shown from the Battle of Gazala to the First Battle of El Alamein.

In 1975, the regiment's flag and traditions were assigned to the 20th Mechanized Infantry Battalion "Monte San Michele", which was assigned to the Mechanized Brigade "Brescia". In 1991, the battalion was disbanded, and the flag of the 20th Infantry Regiment "Brescia" transferred to the Shrine of the Flags in the Vittoriano in Rome. The regiment's anniversary is commemorated on July 15, 1918, which was the first day of the Second Battle of the Marne. During this battle, the Brigade "Brescia" fought to annihilation, resulting in both of its regiments being awarded a Silver Medal of Military Valor.

== History ==
=== First Italian War of Independence ===
On 12 January 1848, the people of Palermo in Sicily rebelled against the rule of Ferdinand II of the House of Bourbon, King of the Two Sicilies. The Sicilian revolution was the first of the revolutions of 1848. After the news of the February Revolution in Paris, which had led to the abdication of King Louis Philippe on 24 February, reached Turin, the King of Sardinia Charles Albert ordered on 1 March 1848 the mobilization of the Royal Sardinian Army. Initially the King's intention was to use the army against his own citizens, if they would rise against the Savoyard dynasty, but on 18 March 1848, the people of Milan, which was the capital of the Habsburg ruled Kingdom of Lombardy–Venetia, rose up and in five days of fighting drove the Austrian forces out of the city. On 23 March 1848, King Charles Albert declared war on the Austrian Empire in the hope that he could use the rebellions in Lombardy–Venetia to expand his own kingdom. Thus began the First Italian War of Independence.

On 25 and 26 March 1848, two Sardinian advance guards crossed the Ticino (river) Ticino river, which formed the border between the Kingdom of Sardinia and the Austrian Empire. On 29 March, the main body of the Royal Sardinian Army crossed the Ticino river and marched directly towards the Quadrilatero fortresses at Mantua, Peschiera del Garda, Verona, and Legnano, in whose vicinity the First Campaign of the war was fought. On 22–27 July 1848, Sardinia lost the Battle of Custoza and the Battle of Volta Mantovana. On the evening of 27 July, King Charles Albert ordered a retreat towards Milan. By 19h in the evening of 4 August 1848, the Sardinian troops had retreated within the walls of Milan, where one hour later King Charles Albert held a war council, which decided to abandon the city due to a lack of munitions and food. The next morning the Sardinians were informed that the Austrian commander Field Marshal Joseph Radetzky von Radetz had agreed to allow the Sardinians to retreat and by 6 August the Sardinians had left Milan and retreated over the Ticino. With the Sardinian troops also thousands of Milanese civilians and many of the Lombard volunteers, who had enrolled in the provisional Lombard battalions of the Provisional Government of Milan, crossed the Ticino. Three days later, on 9 August, the Austrian General Heinrich von Heß and the Sardinian General Carlo Canera di Salasco signed an armistice, which stated that Charles Albert's troops would withdraw from the whole of the Kingdom of Lombardy–Venetia, and the Duchy of Parma and Piacenza and Duchy of Modena and Reggio, whose rulers would be restored to their thrones. Thus ended the First Campaign of the war.

After the armistice the Austrians sent troops to occupy the duchies of Parma and Piacenza and Duchy of Modena and Reggio, while King Charles Albert began to expand his army with the intent to resume the war at the earliest opportunity. On 16 September 1848, the Royal Sardinian Army formed the 19th Infantry Regiment and 20th Infantry Regiment with the Lombard volunteers, who had retreated with the Royal Sardinian Army over the Ticino river after the signing of the armistice. The 19th Infantry Regiment was formed with the I, III, V, IX, X, XI provisional Lombard battalions, while the 20th Infantry Regiment was formed with the II, IV, VI provisional Lombard battalions, the 1st Brescian Jäger Regiment, the 2nd Lombard Legion, and the Cremonese Volunteer Battalion. The two regiments formed the 1st Brigade of the Lombard Division, which was commanded by General Girolamo Ramorino. On 1 October 1848, the 19th Infantry Regiment ceded two battalions to help form the 21st Infantry Regiment, which also received the XXII Provisional Lombard Battalion, while on the same date the 20th Infantry Regiment ceded three battalions to help form the 22nd Infantry Regiment. The two new regiments formed the 2nd Brigade of the Lombard Division.

On 1 March 1849, the Sardinian Chamber of Deputies voted for the resumption of the war, with 94 votes in favour and 24 against. King Charles Albert decided that hostilities would resume on 20 March and, as stipulated in the 1848 armistice, the Austrians were informed about the continuation of the war eight days before the hostilities resumed. Charles Albert massed his army near Novara, while the Lombard Division under General Ramorino was sent to guard the Ticino river crossings at Pavia. On 20 March, the Lombard division was at La Cava, from where it was possible to observe the Ticino river from Pavia to its confluence with the Po river. In the event the Lombard Division was attacked it was to retreat North through Sannazzaro towards Mortara. However, early on 20 March General Ramorino abandoned La Cava and moved his division South across the Po river, leaving only the 21st Infantry Regiment at La Cava with orders to retreat across the Po river if the regiment was attacked. At noon on the same day the whole Austrian Army crossed the Ticino river at Pavia and, even though the 21st Infantry Regiment led Major Luciano Manara resisted for six hours, the Austrians fixed the 21st Infantry Regiment in place with a screening forces, while the main body of the army marched North towards Mortara and Vigevano.

Ultimately the 21st Infantry Regiment was forced to retreat across the Po river, where it joined with the rest of the Lombard Division, which played no role in the remaining events of the war. On 22–23 March 1849, Field Marshal Radetzky decisively defeated the Sardinians in the Battle of Novara and on the evening of the same day King Charles Albert abdicated in favour of his son Victor Emmanuel. On 24 March, the new king met with Radetzky at Vignale and agreed to an armistice, which ended the short Second Campaign of the First Italian War of Independence. As a consequence of the Sardinian defeat the Lombard Division and its four regiments were disbanded in May 1849.

=== Second Italian War of Independence ===
In fall 1859, after the Second Italian War of Independence, the armies of the French Empire and the Kingdom of Sardinia occupied Lombard part of the Kingdom of Lombardy–Venetia, as well as the Duchy of Modena and Reggio, the Duchy of Parma and Piacenza, and the Papal Legations of the Romagne. On 1 November 1859, the Royal Sardinian Army formed eight new infantry regiments to garrison the occupied territories. Each existing infantry regiment, with the exception of the 1st Infantry Regiment and 2nd Infantry Regiment of the Brigade "Re", ceded its III Battalion and three depot companies with recruits, to help form the new infantry regiments. Consequently, on 1 November 1859, the 7th Infantry Regiment and 8th Infantry Regiment of the Brigade "Cuneo" ceded their III Battalion and three depot companies to form the 19th Infantry Regiment in Villefranche-sur-Mer, while the 3rd Infantry Regiment and 4th Infantry Regiment of the Brigade "Piemonte" ceded their III Battalion and three depot companies to form the 20th Infantry Regiment in Nice. On the same day the Brigade "Brescia" was formed and the 19th and 20th infantry regiments assigned to it. The brigade was then sent to garrison Bergamo.

On 1 March 1860, the 19th Infantry Regiment ceded two companies to help form the 27th Infantry Regiment (Brigade "Pavia"), while the 20th Infantry Regiment ceded two companies to help form the 28th Infantry Regiment (Brigade "Pavia"). On 5 May 1860, Giuseppe Garibaldi's Expedition of the Thousand set off, with the support of the Sardinian government, from Genoa and landed on 11 May in Marsala in Sicily. On 15 May 1860, Garibaldi won the Battle of Calatafimi and the Sardinian government decided to send reinforcements to Sicily. This triggered the Sardinian campaign in central and southern Italy. After the successful conclusion of Garibaldi's Expedition of the Thousand the Kingdom of Sardinia annexed the Kingdom of the Two Sicilies and most of the Papal Legations. On 17 March 1861, King Victor Emmanuel II proclaimed himself King of Italy.

=== Third Italian War of Independence ===
On 16 April 1861, the 19th Infantry Regiment ceded one battalion to help form the 58th Infantry Regiment (Brigade "Abruzzi"), while the 20th Infantry Regiment ceded one battalion to help form the 59th Infantry Regiment (Brigade "Calabria"). On 1 August 1862, the 19th Infantry Regiment and 20th Infantry Regiment ceded both their 17th Company and 18th Company to help form the 71st Infantry Regiment (Brigade "Puglie"). On the same date both regiments also ceded a company to help form the 7th Grenadiers Regiment (Grenadiers of Tuscany Brigade). In 1866, the Brigade "Brescia" participated in the Third Italian War of Independence, during which the brigade fought in the Battle of Custoza. In September 1870, the brigade participated in the capture of Rome.

On 25 October 1871, the brigade level was abolished, and the two regiments of the Brigade "Brescia" were renamed 19th Infantry Regiment "Brescia", respectively 20th Infantry Regiment "Brescia". On 2 January 1881, the brigade level was reintroduced, and the two regiments were renamed again as 19th Infantry Regiment (Brigade "Brescia") and 20th Infantry Regiment (Brigade "Brescia"). On 1 November 1884, the 19th Infantry Regiment ceded some of its companies to help form the 91st Infantry Regiment (Brigade "Basilicata"), while the 20th Infantry Regiment ceded some of its companies to help form the 92nd Infantry Regiment (Brigade "Basilicata"). In 1887–88 the regiment's 2nd Company deployed to Massawa for the Italo-Ethiopian War of 1887–1889, which led to the establishment of the Italian colony of Eritrea. In 1895–96, the regiment provided twelve officers and 250 enlisted for units deployed to Italian Eritrea for the First Italo-Ethiopian War.

In 1911, the 20th Infantry Regiment was deployed to Libya for the Italo-Turkish War. The regiment operated in Cyrenaica. In 1913–14, the regiment remained in Libya and fought against local rebels.

=== World War I ===
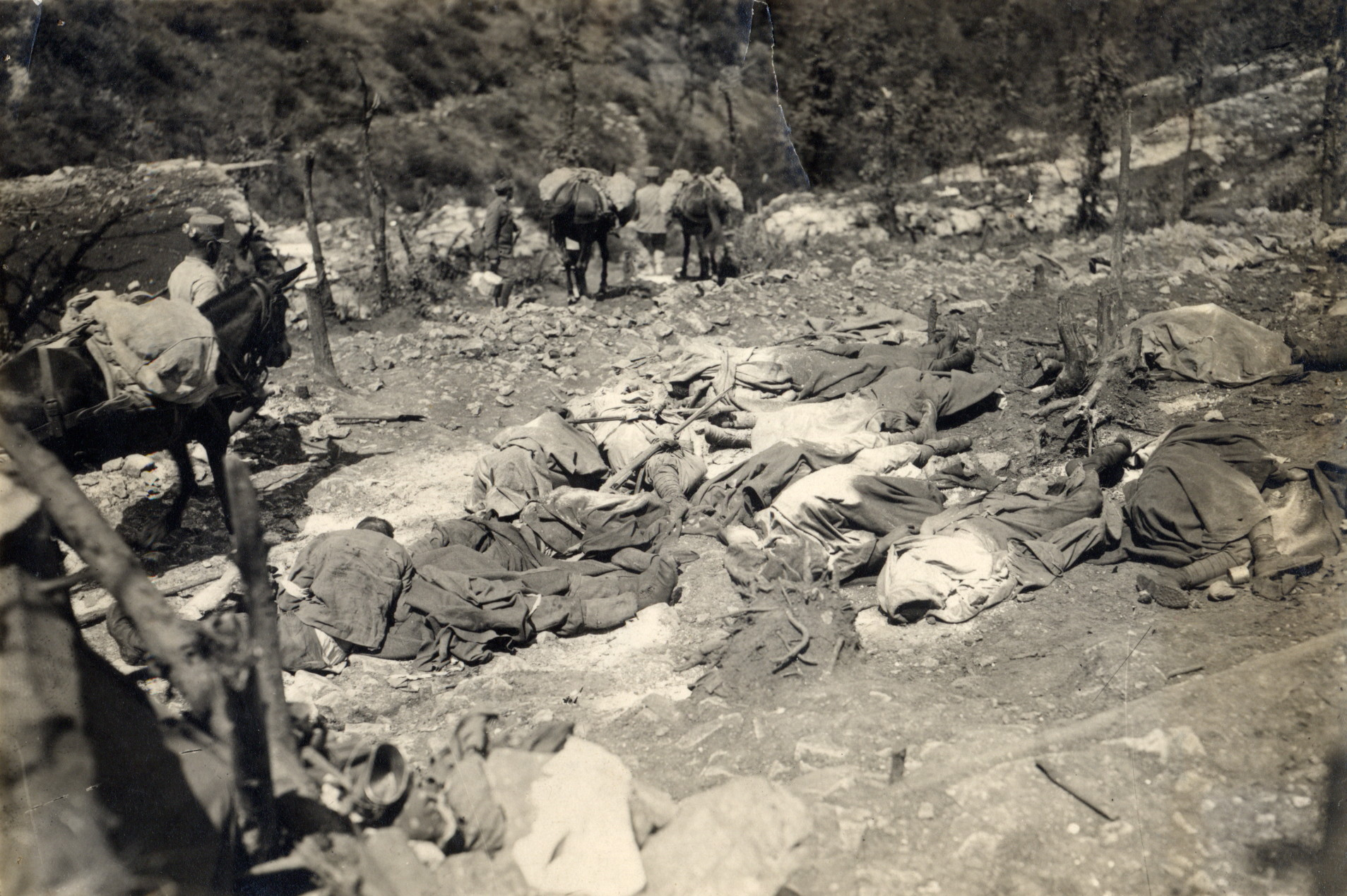
Dead soldiers of the Brigade "Ferrara" dead after the Austro-Hungarian poison gas attack on 29 June 1916

At the outbreak of World War I, the Brigade "Brescia" formed, together with the Brigade "Ferrara" and the 15th Field Artillery Regiment, the 22nd Division. At the time the 20th Infantry Regiment consisted of three battalions, each of which fielded four fusilier companies and one machine gun section. On 24 May 1915, the day after Italy's entry into the war, the Brigade "Brescia" advanced to Lucinico on the lower Isonzo river, where it remained in reserve during the First Battle of the Isonzo. In July 1915, during the Second Battle of the Isonzo, the brigade was tasked with attacking the woods leading up to the Karst plateau. On 18 July, the brigade, together with the Brigade "Pisa", Brigade "Sassari", and Brigade "Alessandria", attacked the woods of Bosco Cappuccio and Bosco Triangolare below San Michele del Carso and San Martino del Carso. By 3 August, the four brigades had taken all of the former and most of the latter at the loss of almost 8,000 men. The Brigade "Brescia" was then sent to the rear to be rebuilt. From 10 to 21 November 1915, during the Fourth Battle of the Isonzo, the brigade attacked Monte San Michele, which, even though the attacks cost the Brigade "Brescia" more than 2,500 casualties, remained in Austro-Hungarian hands.

On 29 June 1916, Austro-Hungarian troops attacked the line on Monte San Michele, which was held by the I Battalion of the 19th Infantry Regiment, II Battalion of the 20th Infantry Regiment, the II and III battalions of the 30th Infantry Regiment (Brigade "Pisa") and the battalions of the 48th Infantry Regiment (Brigade "Ferrara") with a mix of phosgene and chlorine gas. After the gas had killed most of the Italian troops, the Austro-Hungarians occupied the first Italian trench lines, but the remaining units of the Italian brigades counterattacked and retook the captured trenches. On 29 June, the Brigade "Brescia" suffered more than 1,200 casualties, while the Brigade "Pisa" suffered more than 1,600 casualties, and the 48th Infantry Regiment more than a 1,000 casualties.

On 6 August 1916, on first day of the Sixth Battle of the Isonzo, the Brigade "Brescia" again attacked Monte San Michele and, at the cost of 930 men, took the summit and held it against a series of Austro-Hungarian counterattacks in the following three days. On 15 August, the brigade attacked the new emey line on the Karst plateau along the Pečinka hill. The unsuccessful attack cost the brigade more than 1,400 casualties. On 12 August 1916, both regiments of the Brigade "Brescia" were awarded a Silver Medal of Military Valor for their conduct and valor shown in July 1915 at Bosco Cappuccio and on 29 June 1916 on Monte San Michele. The medals were affixed to the regiments' flags and added to their coat of arms.

After a brief rest in the rear the brigade returned to the first line on the Karst plateau on 12 September in preparation for the Seventh Battle of the Isonzo, which began on 14 September 1916. This time the brigade attacked towards Kostanjevica na Krasu and lost almost 1,600 men in a few days. The brigade attacked the same area during the Eighth Battle of the Isonzo in October 1916 and suffered another 960 casualties. In January 1917, the depot of the 20th Infantry Regiment in Reggio Calabria formed the command of the Brigade "Siracusa" and the 246th Infantry Regiment for the new brigade. From 10 May to 8 June 1917, the Brigade "Brescia" fought in the Tenth Battle of the Isonzo, attacking the Fajti hrib hill on the Karst plateau in May and then in early June trying to defend the Flondar hill, which had been captured on 26 May 1917 by the Brigade "Bergamo", against Austro-Hungarian counterattacks in the Battle of Flondar. Having suffered 1,900 casualties since 10 May the brigade was sent to rear to rest. During the Eleventh Battle of the Isonzo the brigade was tasked with crossing the Isonzo river at Avče. On 23 August 1917, the brigade crossed the river, but determined Austro-Hungarian resistance and heavy losses (more than 1,600 casualties) prevent the brigade from expanding the small bridgehead.

On 24 October 1917, Austro-Hungarian forces, reinforced by German units, commenced the Battle of Caporetto. The German forces were able to break into the Italian front line at Caporetto and rout the Italian forces opposing them, which forced the Italian armies along the Isonzo river and in the Julian Alps to retreat behind the Piave river. On 19 November 1917, the remnants of the Brigade "Brescia", which had lost more than 2,200 men during the retreat, reached Padua, from where the brigade was sent to Parma to be rebuilt.

In April 1918, the Brigade "Brescia" was assigned to the II Army Corps, which was deployed to the Western Front in France. There the brigade operated in May in the Argonne sector and in June in the Bligny area. On 15 July 1918, the Second Battle of the Marne began and the Brigade "Brescia", which was deployed in the Bois de Courton, was attacked by German A7V and captured British Mark IV tanks — the first time in history Italian troops encountered tanks in combat. The heavy fighting on 15 July cost the Brigade "Brescia" 3,853 casualties. The brigade had to be pulled out of the line and rebuilt in the rear. In October 1918, the brigade participated in the Hundred Days Offensive, initially along the Aisne, and then at Chemin des Dames. On 12 October the Italian troops crossed the Ailette river and on 14 October, the brigade liberated Sissonne. On 5 November 1918, the pursuit of the retreating Germans began: on 7 November the brigade liberated Résigny, on 9 November Marby and Étalle, on 10 November Rimogne and the next day, the last day of the war, Les Mazures.

For their conduct in France the two regiments of the Brigade "Brescia" were both awarded a Silver Medal of Military Valor. The medals were affixed to the flags of the two regiments and added to their coat of arms.

=== Interwar years ===
On 4 November 1926, the Brigade "Savona" was disbanded and the 16th Infantry Regiment "Savona" was transferred to the Brigade "Brescia", which on 6 November 1926, was renamed XXVII Infantry Brigade. The brigade was the infantry component of the 27th Territorial Division of Catanzaro, which also included the 12th Field Artillery Regiment. At the same time the brigade's original two infantry regiments were renamed 19th Infantry Regiment "Brescia" and 20th Infantry Regiment "Brescia". After being assigned to the XXVII Infantry Brigade, the 16th Infantry Regiment "Savona" moved from Gaeta to Vibo Valentia and in 1928 to Cosenza.

On 1 January 1935, the 27th Territorial Division of Catanzaro changed its name to 27th Infantry Division "Sila". A name change that also extended to the division's infantry brigade. In May 1935, the "Sila" division was slated to deploy to Eritrea for the Second Italo-Ethiopian War and consequently on 1 June 1935, the depot of the 16th Infantry Regiment "Savona" in Cosenza reformed the 132nd Infantry Regiment "Lazio", while the depot of the 20th Infantry Regiment "Brescia" in Reggio Calabria reformed the 244th Infantry Regiment "Cosenza". On 1 July 1935, the depot of the 12th Field Artillery Regiment in Capua reformed the 45th Field Artillery Regiment. On 20 September 1935, the depot of the 19th Infantry Regiment "Brescia" in Catanzaro reformed the 243rd Infantry Regiment "Cosenza". On the same date the 27th Infantry Division "Sila" embarked for East Africa, and as replacement the 127th Infantry Division "Sila II" was formed in Catanzaro. The "Sila II" division included 45th Field Artillery Regiment and the CXXVII Infantry Brigade "Sila II", which consisted of the three recently reformed infantry regiments.

=== Second Italo-Ethiopian War ===
On 3 October 1935, the Second Italo-Ethiopian War began and the "Sila" division participated in the capture of Mek'ele. From 4 November 1935, the division guarded the Italian supply lines from Adi Kuala in Eritrea to Adigrat in Ethiopia. In December 1936, the division fought in the Ādī K’edawīt – Doghea pass area. Afterwards the division undertook reconnaissance raids towards Ziban Debrī Bota and Celecot. On 19 January 1936, the "Sila" division broke through the Ethiopian defenses and captured towns in Tembien Province. It did not participate in the nearby First Battle of Tembien and acted only in the final stages of Battle of Amba Aradam, capturing Āmba Ālagē on 26 February 1936. In March 1936, the Sila moved to Finarwa – Sek'ot'a region where it stayed until the end of war.

In October 1936, the "Sila" division was repatriated. For their service in Ethiopia between 3 October 1935 and 5 May 1936, the division's infantry regiments were awarded, like all infantry units, which had participated in the war, a Military Order of Italy, which was affixed to the regiments' flags. Additionally the 16th Infantry Regiment "Savona" was awarded a Silver Medal of Military Valor for its conduct during the Battle of Amba Aradam, while the 19th Infantry Regiment "Brescia" and 20th Infantry Regiment "Brescia" were both awarded a Bronze Medal of Military Valor for their conduct over the course of the entire campaign. The three medals were affixed to the three regiments' flags and added to their coat of arms. After the "Sila" division returned to its bases the "Sila II" division and its units were disbanded in November 1936.

On 27 April 1939, the 16th Infantry Regiment "Savona" and 12th Field Artillery Regiment were transferred to the newly formed 55th Infantry Division "Savona". On 24 May 1939, the XXVII Infantry Brigade "Sila" was disbanded and the 19th and 20th infantry regiments came under direct command of the division, which was renamed 27th Infantry Division "Brescia". In August 1939, the division was ordered to move to Tripolitania in Libya and on 1 September 1939, the 55th Artillery Regiment "Brescia" was reformed and assigned to the division. On 12 September 1939, the 48th Infantry Division "Taro" was formed and took over the bases in Italy once occupied by the 27th Infantry Division "Brescia".

=== World War II ===
At the outbreak of World War II, the 20th Infantry Regiment "Brescia" consisted of a command, a command company, three fusilier battalions, a support weapons battery equipped with 65/17 infantry support guns, and a mortar company equipped with 81mm Mod. 35 mortars. On 10 June 1940, Italy entered World War II by invading France. During the invasion of France the "Brescia" division was deployed along the French Tunisian-Libyan border. On 24 June 1940, the Franco-Italian Armistice was signed and the "Brescia" division returned to its garrisons.

==== Western Desert campaign ====
On 9 September 1940, the Italian 10th Army invaded Egypt. On 9 December 1940, the British Western Desert Force commenced Operation Compass and within days annihilated entire Italian divisions. In late December 1940, the "Brescia" division's 55th Artillery Regiment "Brescia" and some of the division's smaller units were sent to Cyrenaica to reinforce the Italian strongpoint at Tobruk, where the 55th Artillery Regiment "Brescia" was attached to the 61st Infantry Division "Sirte". The "Sirte" division and the 55th Artillery Regiment "Brescia" were overrun and destroyed on 21–22 January 1941 during the British capture of Tobruk.

In early March, 1941 the "Brescia" division assembled at El Agheila and, together with German forces, started a counter-attack on 24 March 1941, which defeated British troops at Brega on 31 March 1941. On 2 April 1941, the "Brescia" division entered Ajdabiya. On 12 April 1941, Italian and German forces commenced the Siege of Tobruk, while the "Brescia" division, together with the 21st Panzer Division's 3rd Reconnaissance Battalion, advanced to Bardia. In April 1941, the "Brescia" division received the 1st Fast Artillery Regiment "Eugenio di Savoia" from the 1st Cavalry Division "Eugenio di Savoia" as replacement for the destroyed 55th Artillery Regiment "Brescia". The "Brescia" division was then ordered to reinforce the siege of Tobruk, where, during the night of 30 April 1941, the "Brescia" division and the 132nd Armored Division "Ariete" captured seven British strong points. During the night of 16 May 1941, the "Brescia" division, reinforced by two platoons of the XXXII Sappers Battalion and captured three more British strongpoints.

On 18 November 1941, the British Eighth Army launched Operation Crusader, with the aim to break the siege of Tobruk. On 27 November 1941, British forces reached the siege ring around Tobruk and for the next 13 days the battle to break the siege raged. The "Brescia" division, as part of the besieging forces, held out with the other Axis forces until 8–9 December 1941, when the order to retreat to Ain el Gazala was given. On 18 December 1941, British forces outflanked Gazala line in the south and the Axis forces were forced to retreat to Ajdabiya, where the "Brescia" division arrived on 22 December 1941.

For their conduct and bravery between April and December 1941, the regiments of the 27th Infantry Division "Brescia" received the following military honors: the 19th Infantry Regiment "Brescia" and the 1st Fast Artillery Regiment "Eugenio di Savoia" were both awarded a Bronze Medal of Military Valor, while the 20th Infantry Regiment "Brescia" was awarded a Silver Medal of Military Valor. The medals were affixed to the regiments' flags and added to their coat of arms.

On 26 May 1942, Axis forces began the Battle of Gazala, which forced the British 8th Army to retreat. On 17–21 June 1942, Italo-German forces invested and then captured Tobruk. Already on 20 June 1942, and the "Brescia" division had resumed the advance and drove through Bardia, Sallum and Sidi Barrani, before it participated on 26–29 June in the Battle of Mersa Matruh. On 1 July 1942, the First Battle of El Alamein began, which lasted until 27 July 1942. For their conduct and bravery between 26 May and 30 July 1942, all three regiments of the 27th Infantry Division "Brescia" were awarded Italy's highest military honor a Gold Medal of Military Valor. The medals were affixed to the regiments' flags and added to their coat of arms.

From 30 August to 5 September 1942, the "Brescia" division fought in the Battle of Alam el Halfa. On 23 October 1942, the Second Battle of El Alamein began and the "Brescia" division defeated all British armored attacks on its positions until 4 November 1942. On that day, the "Brescia" division and other Italian divisions tried to escape the allied breakthrough and advance to their North. The "Brescia" division retreated along the Deir Sha'la – Fukah route, but due to a lack of transport British motorized units overtook and surrounded the division's units, which were annihilated on 7 November 1942, within sight of Fukah. On 27 November 1942, the "Brescia" division and its regiments were declared lost due to wartime events.

=== Cold War ===
Between 31 July and 6 September 1958, the 19th Infantry Regiment "Brescia" and 20th Infantry Regiment "Brescia" were reformed with reservists to test the Italian Army's ability to mobilize additional units in case of war. The two regiments were assigned to the Infantry Division "Trieste" and encamped in San Piero in Bagno respectively in Cagli. Both regiments consisted of a command, a command company, three fusilier battalions, and a mortar company with M30 mortars.

During the 1975 army reform the army disbanded the regimental level and newly independent battalions were granted for the first time their own flags. On 1 September 1975, the III Battalion of the 68th Infantry Regiment "Legnano" in Brescia became an autonomous unit and was renamed 20th Mechanized Infantry Battalion "Monte San Michele". The battalion was assigned to the Mechanized Brigade "Brescia" and consisted of a command, a command and services company, three mechanized companies with M113 armored personnel carriers, and a heavy mortar company with M106 mortar carriers with 120mm Mod. 63 mortars. At the time the battalion fielded 896 men (45 officers, 100 non-commissioned officers, and 751 soldiers).

On 12 November 1976, the President of the Italian Republic Giovanni Leone assigned with decree 846 the flag and traditions of the 20th Infantry Regiment "Brescia" to the 20th Mechanized Infantry Battalion "Monte San Michele".

=== Recent times ===
With the end of the Cold War the Italian Army began to draw down its forces. On 30 April 1991, the 20th Mechanized Infantry Battalion "Monte San Michele" was disbanded and the following 29 May the flag of the 20th Infantry Regiment "Brescia" was transferred to the Shrine of the Flags in the Vittoriano in Rome.
