= I Army Corps (Italy) =

- I Corpo d'Armata
- Active: 1877 – September 1943
- Country: Italy
- Branch: Royal Italian Army
- Size: Corps
- Garrison/HQ: Turin
- Engagements: World War I Second Italo-Ethiopian War; World War II: Italian invasion of France; Case Anton; Operation Achse

The I Army Corps (Italian: I Corpo d'Armata) was a corps of the Royal Italian Army between 1877 and 1943.

== History ==
The I Army Corps was based in Turin and participated in World War I. Between 1935 and 1937, it was part of the Italian Army that fought the Second Italo-Ethiopian War, which led to the Italian occupation of Ethiopia.

In June 1940, it took part in the Italian invasion of France. It reached Bessans, Bramans, Modane, and Termignon in the Savoie. On 15 July it was sent back to Turin.
After the landings of the Allies in French North Africa, I Corps participated in Case Anton and on 11 November 1942, it entered French territory again. Starting from December, it took up coastal defense tasks between Cavater and Cape Martin. It remained here until September 1943, when it was disarmed by the Germans and dissolved after the Armistice of Cassibile.

== World War I composition ==
- I Army Corps — Lieutenant General Ottavio Ragni
  - 1st Division — Major General Alfonso Pettiti di Roreto
    - Brigade "Parma"
      - 49th Infantry Regiment (Battalions I-III)
      - 50th Infantry Regiment (Battalions I, IV, V — the regiment's II and III battalions were deployed overseas and the IV and V battalions had been formed as replacement)
    - Brigade "Basilicata"
      - 91st Infantry Regiment (Battalions I-III)
      - 92nd Infantry Regiment (Battalions I-III)
    - 25th Field Artillery Regiment (5 × batteries with 75/27 mod. 06 field guns — 3 × batteries were assigned to the 31st Division) (arrived 7–13 June)
    - 6th and 13th pack batteries with 70A mountain guns (arrived 1 June)
    - 5th Company, 2nd Engineer Regiment (Sappers)
  - 2nd Division — Major General Saverio Nasalli Rocca
    - Brigade "Como"
      - 23rd Infantry Regiment (Battalions I, IV, V — the regiment's II and III battalions were deployed overseas and the IV and V battalions had been formed as replacement)
      - 24th Infantry Regiment (Battalions I-III)
    - Brigade "Umbria"
      - 53rd Infantry Regiment (Battalions I-III)
      - 54th Infantry Regiment (Battalions I-III)
    - 17th Field Artillery Regiment (8 × batteries with 75/27 mod. 06 field guns)
  - 10th Division — Major General Giovanni Scrivante
    - Brigade "Marche"
      - 55th Infantry Regiment (Battalions I-III)
      - 56th Infantry Regiment (Battalions I-III)
    - Brigade "Ancona"
      - 69th Infantry Regiment (Battalions I-III)
      - 70th Infantry Regiment (Battalions I-III)
    - 20th Field Artillery Regiment (8 × batteries with 75/27 mod. 06 field guns)
    - 11th Company, 1st Engineer Regiment (Sappers)
    - 14th Company, 2nd Engineer Regiment (Sappers)
  - Corps Troops
    - Regiment "Cavalleggeri di Padova" (21st) (5 × cavalry squadrons) (arrived 30 May)
    - 8th Field Artillery Regiment (8 × batteries with 75/27 mod. 06 field guns)
    - 1/2 7th, and 21st Companies, 5th Engineer Regiment (Miners)
    - 12th Telegraphers Company, 3rd Engineer Regiment (Telegraphers)

== Composition (1940–1943) ==
- 1st Infantry Division "Superga" (1940–1941)
- 24th Infantry Division "Pinerolo" (1940)
- 59th Infantry Division "Cagliari" (1940)
- 223rd Coastal Division
- 224th Coastal Division

== Commanders ==
- Ruggero Santini (1935.05 - 1936)
- Carlo Vecchiarelli (1940.04.09 – 1940.09.01)
- Curio Barbasetti di Prun (1940.09.01 – 1942.03.01)
- Federico Romero (1942.03.01 – 1943.09.08)
