= 16th Infantry Regiment "Savona" =

Inactive Italian Army infantry unit

- 16° Reggimento Fanteria "Savona"
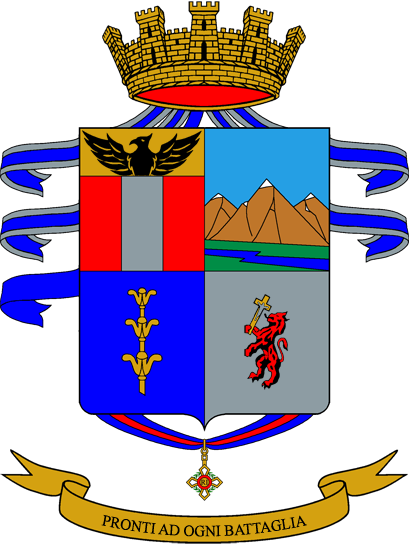
- Regimental coat of arms
- Active: 1 April 1815 – 31 May 1821; 19 Dec. 1821 – 17 Jan. 1942; 15 Nov. 1975 – 31 May 1991
- Country: Italy
- Branch: Italian Army
- Part of: Northwestern Military Region
- Garrison/HQ: Savona
- Motto: "Pronti ad ogni battaglia"
- Anniversaries: 30 May 1859 – Battle of Palestro
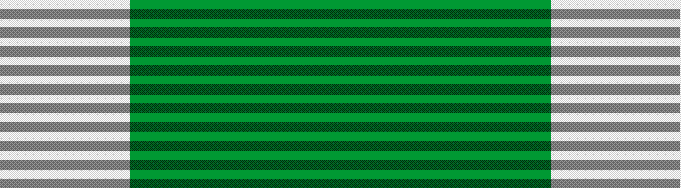
- Decorations: 2× Military Order of Italy; 4× Silver Medals of Military Valor; 1× Bronze Medal of Military Valor; 1× Bronze Medal of Merit

Insignia
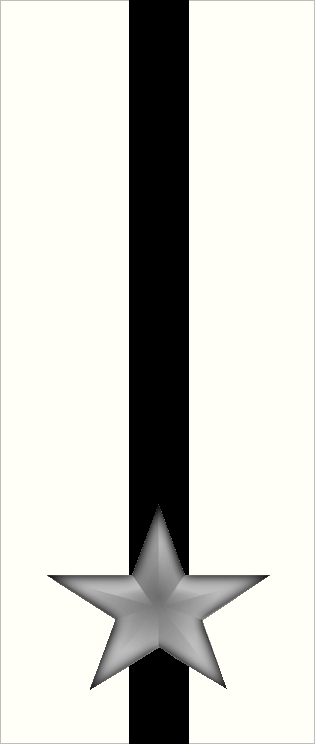
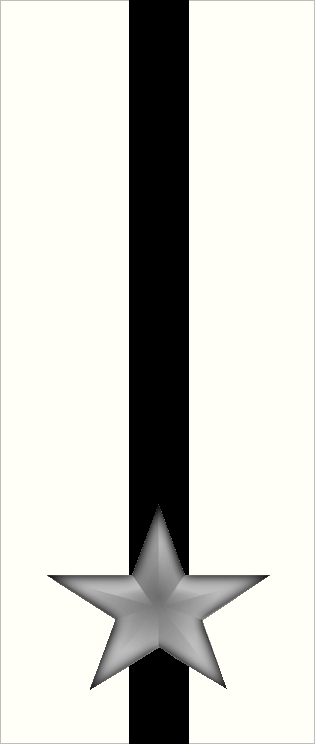
- Regimental gorget patches

The 16th Infantry Regiment "Savona" (Italian: 16° Reggimento Fanteria "Savona") is an inactive unit of the Italian Army last based in Savona in Liguria. The regiment is named for the city of Savona and part of the Italian Army's infantry arm. The regiment was formed on 19 December 1821 by the Royal Sardinian Army as Brigade of "Savona", with the troops of the Brigade of "Genova", who had remained loyal during the revolt in Piedmont in spring 1821 and were retained in service after the Brigade of "Genova" was disbanded on 31 May 1821. Later the Royal Italian Army allowed the two regiments of the Brigade "Savona" to claim the traditions and honors of the Brigade of "Genova", for which reason the regiment's founding is today considered to be 1 April 1815.

After Napoleon Bonaparte's defeat in the War of the Sixth Coalition the King Victor Emmanuel I of Sardinia returned from exile in Sardinia to Turin in Piedmont. In fall 1814, the European powers at the Congress of Vienna decided that the Republic of Genoa would not be reestablished and its territory given to the Kingdom of Sardinia. On 7 January 1815, the British occupation forces in Genoa handed control of the city to the Piedmontese General Ignazio Thaon di Revel. On 1 April 1815, the existing line infantry units of the Republic of Genoa were used to form the Regiment "Sarzana", which within a few weeks was renamed Regiment of "Genova". In fall of the same year the 15 militia regiments of the Kingdom of Sardinia were disbanded and their battalions assigned as reserve units to the army's regular regiments. Consequently, on 1 November 1815 the Regiment of "Genova" was renamed Brigade of "Genova".

In March 1821 most of the brigade's personnel participated, with the troops of three other infantry brigades and three cavalry regiments, in a revolt against King Victor Emmanuel I, who abdicated in favor of his brother Charles Felix. After the revolt Charles Felix had the four infantry brigades and three cavalry regiments disbanded. The troops of the Brigade of "Genova", who had remained loyal during the revolt, were used to form the new Brigade of "Savona" on 19 December 1821. On the same date, the personnel of the other three brigades, which had remained loyal, was used to form the new brigades "Casale", "Pinerolo", and "Acqui". The seniority of the four new brigades was determined by drawing lots.

In 1831, the brigade was renamed Brigade "Savona" and split into two regiments, which in 1839 were designated 15th Infantry Regiment (Brigade "Savona") and 16th Infantry Regiment (Brigade "Savona"). In 1848–49, the regiment participated in the First Italian War of Independence, and in 1855–56 four of the regiment's companies fought in the Crimean War. In 1859, the regiment participated in the Second Italian War of Independence and the following year in the Sardinian campaign in central and southern Italy. In 1866, the regiment fought in the Third Italian War of Independence and in 1870 it participated in the capture of Rome. During World War I, the regiment fought on the Italian front. In 1934, the regiment was assigned to the 27th Infantry Division "Sila", with which it fought in 1935–36 in the Second Italo-Ethiopian War. During World War II, the regiment was assigned to the 55th Infantry Division "Savona", with which it was deployed to Libya for the Western Desert Campaign. In January 1942, the "Savona" division and its regiments were destroyed during the British Operation Crusader and declared lost due to wartime events on 17 January 1942.

In 1975, the regiment's flag and traditions were assigned to the 16th Infantry Battalion "Savona", which trained recruits destined for the Armored Division "Ariete". In 1991, the battalion was disbanded and the flag of the 13th Infantry Regiment "Pinerolo" transferred to the Shrine of the Flags in the Vittoriano in Rome. The regiment's anniversary falls on 30 May 1859, the day of the Battle of Palestro, during which the Brigade "Savona" distinguished itself, for which the brigade's two regiments were both awarded a Silver Medal of Military Valor.

== History ==
=== Formation ===
On 6 April 1814, Emperor Napoleon abdicated and on 11 April the winners of the War of the Sixth Coalition exiled him to the island of Elba. On 20 May 1814, King Victor Emmanuel I of Sardinia returned from exile in Sardinia to Turin. On 24 May 1814, Victor Emmanuel I ordered to reform the regiments disbanded in 1799, when French forces had occupied his continental possessions. On 27 June 1814, Victor Emmanuel I ordered that the 15 provincial militia regiments, which had been disbanded in 1799, should be reformed.

In September 1814, the Congress of Vienna began, during which the European powers decided the new layout of the European political and constitutional order after the downfall of the Emperor Napoleon. By October the Congress had decided that the Republic of Genoa would not be reestablished and its territory given to the Kingdom of Sardinia. The Republic of Genoa, which had been annexed by Napoleon's First French Empire in June 1805, protested the decision, but on 7 January 1815, the British occupation forces in Genoa handed control of the city to the Piedmontese General Ignazio Thaon di Revel. On 1 April 1815, the existing line infantry units of the Republic of Genoa were used to form the Regiment "Sarzana", which within a few weeks was renamed Regiment of "Genova" after the newly created Duchy of Genoa. The regiment consisted of a staff, and two battalions, both of which fielded one grenadier company, four fusilier companies, and one Jäger company.

In October 1815, the provincial regiments were disbanded and their battalions assigned to the regular regiments as reserve battalions. The Regiment of "Genova" received the two battalions of the Provincial Regiment of "Tortona". Consequently, on 1 November 1815, the regiment was renamed Brigade of "Genova". Each brigade consisted of two battalions in peacetime and four reserve battalions, which would be mobilized in wartime. The battalions had a strength of 789 men and consisted of a staff, a grenadier company, and six fusilier companies. At the same time the battalion's Jäger companies were used to form independent light infantry battalions. The brigade's peacetime organizations was then as follows.

- Brigade of "Genova"
  - Regimental Staff
  - 1st Battalion
    - 1st Grenadier Company
    - 1st Division, consisting of the 1st and 3rd fusilier companies
    - 2nd Division, consisting of the 5th and 7th fusilier companies
    - 3rd Division, consisting of the 9th and 11th fusilier companies
  - 2nd Battalion
    - 2nd Grenadier Company
    - 1st Division, consisting of the 2nd and 4th fusilier companies
    - 2nd Division, consisting of the 6th and 8th fusilier companies
    - 3rd Division, consisting of the 10th and 12th fusilier companies

The brigade was assigned the provinces of Tortona, Savona, Albenga, Genoa, Chiavari, Novi, Levante, Voghera, and Bobbio as recruiting zone. On 9 October 1819, King Victor Emmanuel I ordered to reduce the number of troops per battalion to 600 men, while adding two additional reserve battalions to each regiment.

=== Revolt of 1821 ===
After returning from exile King Victor Emmanuel I abolished all the freedoms granted by the Napoleonic Code and established a fiercely oppressive rule. The widespread resentment of this kind of rule led in March 1821 to a liberal revolt in Piedmont. Four infantry brigades (Brigade of "Monferrato", Brigade of "Saluzzo", Brigade of "Alessandria", Brigade of "Genova") and three cavalry regiments (Regiment "Dragoni del Re", Regiment "Dragoni della Regina", Regiment "Cavalleggeri del Re") sided with the revolutionaries against Victor Emmanuel I, who, on 13 March 1821, abdicated in favor of his brother Charles Felix. Charles Felix asked for Austrian troops to help suppress the revolt. On 8 April 1815, the rebellious units were dispersed by a joint Austro-Sardinian army near Novara.

On 31 May 1821, the four infantry brigades, which had sided with the revolutionaries, were stricken from the rolls of the Royal Sardinian Army and their personnel dismissed from service, while the troops of the stricken brigades, who had not participated in the revolt, were assigned to four provisional line battalions. The troops of the Brigade of "Genova", who remained in service, were assigned to the 4th Provisional Line Battalion, while the remaining troops of the Brigade of "Monferrato" were assigned to the 1st Provisional Line Battalion, the troops of the Brigade of "Saluzzo" to the 2nd Provisional Line Battalion, and the troops of the Brigade of "Alessandria" to the 3rd Provisional Line Battalion. On 19 December 1821, the four provisional line battalions were used to form four new infantry brigades:

- Brigade of "Casale": formed with the 1st Provisional Line Battalion and the Italian Jäger Battalion
- Brigade of "Pinerolo": formed with the 2nd Provisional Line Battalion and the 2nd Battalion of the Royal Light Legion
- Brigade of "Acqui": formed with the 3rd Provisional Line Battalion and the 3rd Battalion of the Royal Light Legion
- Brigade of "Savona": formed with the 4th Provisional Line Battalion and a battalion of new recruits

The order of precedence of the battalions within the brigades, as well as the seniority and thus the order of precedence of the four new brigades, was determined by drawing lots. The result ranked the Brigade of "Casale" as the oldest, the Brigade of "Pinerolo" as the second oldest, the Brigade of "Savona" as the third oldest, and the Brigade of "Acqui" as the youngest of the new brigades.

=== Reforms of 1830, 1831, and 1839 ===
On 1 December 1830, the Royal Sardinian Army's infantry brigades were reorganized. Each brigade consisted afterwards of a staff and five battalions: a grenadier battalion with four grenadier companies, two fusilier battalions with six fusilier companies per battalion, a Jäger battalion with four Jäger companies, and a depot battalion with six fusilier companies. The latter six fusilier companies consisted in peacetime only of training personnel, which in wartime would have trained the recruits destined to reinforce the brigade's fusilier battalions. Each brigade consisted in peacetime of 105 officers and 2,990 enlisted, which would have increased to 4,069 troops in wartime.

On 25 October 1831, the Royal Sardinian Army's infantry brigades were reorganized once more: each brigade added two regimental commands, which were numbered 1st Regiment and 2nd Regiment. Each regiment consisted of two battalions in peacetime and three battalions in wartime. Each battalion consisted of four fusilier companies, a grenadier company, and a Jäger company. The Brigade "Savona" then consisted of the 1st Regiment (Brigade "Savona") and 2nd Regiment (Brigade "Savona"). On 9 June 1832, the regiment's third battalions were reorganized as depot battalions. On 4 May 1839, the regiments were renamed infantry regiment and renumbered by seniority from 1 to 18. The two regiments of the Brigade "Savona" were now designated 15th Infantry Regiment (Brigade "Savona") and 16th Infantry Regiment (Brigade "Savona"). Each regiment consisted of the I and II battalions with one grenadier company and three fusilier companies per battalion, the III Battalion with four Jäger companies, and the IV Battalion, which was a depot battalion with four fusilier companies.

=== First Italian War of Independence ===
In 1848–49, the 16th Infantry Regiment (Brigade "Savona") participated in the First Italian War of Independence, fighting in 1848 in the capture of the bridge at Monzambano, the Skirmish of Pastrengo, the Battle of Santa Lucia, the Battle of Rivoli, the Battle of Volta Mantovana, and the Defense of Milan. In 1849, the regiment fought in the Battle of Novara. On 23 March 1849, after being defeated in the Battle of Novara, King Charles Albert abdicated in favour of his son Victor Emmanuel. On 24 March, the new king met with the Austrian Field Marshal Radetzky at Vignale and agreed to an armistice, which ended the First Italian War of Independence. For its conduct in the Battle of Novara the 16th Infantry Regiment was awarded a Bronze Medal of Military Valor, which was also affixed to the regiment's flag. On 12 October 1849, the Royal Sardinian Army's 18 infantry regiments were reorganized and then consisted of a staff and three battalions of four fusilier companies per battalion. In April 1850, each regiment added a fourth battalion with four fusilier companies.

In 1855, the Cholera pandemic of 1854–55 arrived in the Kingdom of Sardinia and the troops of the 16th Infantry Regiment were assigned to the hospitals in Genoa to support the medical staff. For its conduct during the Cholera pandemic the regiment was awarded a Bronze Medal of Merit, which was affixed to the regiment's flag. During the same year, the first company of each of the regiment's four battalions, namely the 1st, 5th, 9th and 13th Company, were assigned to the 4th Battalion of the 4th Provisional Regiment, which was part of the Sardinian Expeditionary Corps in the Crimean War. In Crimea the battalion fought in the Battle of the Chernaya and then participated in the Siege of Sevastopol.

=== Second Italian War of Independence ===
In 1859, the 16th Infantry Regiment (Brigade "Savona") participated in the Second Italian War of Independence, during which the regiment fought in the Battle of Palestro. For its conduct on 30 and 31 May 1859 in the Battle of Palestro the regiment was awarded a Silver Medal of Military Valor, which was affixed to the regiment's flag. In fall 1859, the armies of the Second French Empire and the Kingdom of Sardinia occupied Lombard part of the Kingdom of Lombardy–Venetia, as well as the Duchy of Modena and Reggio, the Duchy of Parma and Piacenza, and the Papal Legations of the Romagne. On 1 November 1859, the Royal Sardinian Army formed eight new infantry regiments to garrison the occupied territories. Each existing infantry regiment, with the exception of the 1st Infantry Regiment and 2nd Infantry Regiment of the Brigade "Re", ceded its III Battalion and three depot companies, to help form the new infantry regiments. Consequently, on 1 November 1859, the 15th Infantry Regiment and 16th Infantry Regiment of the Brigade "Savona" ceded their III Battalion and three depot companies to form the 25th Infantry Regiment, which on the same day was assigned to the newly formed Brigade "Bergamo".

On 1 March 1860, the 15th Infantry Regiment ceded a company to help form the 27th Infantry Regiment (Brigade "Pavia"), while the 16th Infantry Regiment ceded a company to help form the 28th Infantry Regiment (Brigade "Pavia"). On 5 May 1860, Giuseppe Garibaldi's Expedition of the Thousand set off, with the support of the Sardinian government, from Genoa and landed on 11 May in Marsala in Sicily. On 15 May 1860, Garibaldi won the Battle of Calatafimi and the Sardinian government decided to send reinforcements to Sicily. This triggered the Sardinian campaign in central and southern Italy, durich which the Brigade "Savona", together with the Brigade "Regina", was assigned to the 4th Division. During the campaign, the Brigade "Savona" fought in the capture of Pesaro, the Battle of Castelfidardo, the Siege of Ancona, and the Siege of Gaeta. After the successful conclusion of Garibaldi's Expedition of the Thousand the Kingdom of Sardinia annexed the Kingdom of the Two Sicilies and most of the Papal Legations. On 17 March 1861, King Victor Emmanuel II proclaimed himself King of Italy.

=== Third Italian War of Independence ===
On 16 April 1861, the 15th Infantry Regiment ceded a battalion to help form the 55th Infantry Regiment (Brigade "Marche"), while the 16th Infantry Regiment ceded a battalion to help form the 56th Infantry Regiment (Brigade "Marche"). On 1 August 1862, the 15th Infantry Regiment and 16th Infantry Regiment ceded both their 17th Company and 18th Company to help form the 64th Infantry Regiment (Brigade "Cagliari"). In 1866, the Brigade "Savona" participated in the Third Italian War of Independence and in 1870 in the capture of Rome.

On 25 October 1871, the brigade level was abolished, and the two regiments of the Brigade "Savona" were renamed 15th Infantry Regiment "Savona", respectively 16th Infantry Regiment "Savona". On 2 January 1881, the brigade level was reintroduced, and the two regiments were renamed again as 15th Infantry Regiment (Brigade "Savona") and 16th Infantry Regiment (Brigade "Savona"). On 1 November 1884, the 15th Infantry Regiment ceded some of its companies to help form the 91st Infantry Regiment (Brigade "Basilicata"), while the 16th Infantry Regiment ceded some of its companies to help form the 92nd Infantry Regiment (Brigade "Basilicata"). In 1895–96, the regiment provided eleven officers and 268 enlisted for units deployed to Italian Eritrea for the First Italo-Ethiopian War. In 1911–12, the regiment provided volunteers for units deployed to Libya for the Italo-Turkish War. In 1913, the 16th Infantry Regiment was sent to Libya to fight local rebels. In 1914, the regiment returned to its base in Gaeta.

=== World War I ===
At the outbreak of World War I, the Brigade "Savona" formed, together with the Brigade "Cagliari" and the 34th Field Artillery Regiment, the 20th Division. At the time the 16th Infantry Regiment consisted of three battalions, each of which fielded four fusilier companies and one machine gun section. On 1 March 1915, the depot of the 16th Infantry Regiment in Gaeta formed the 132nd Infantry Regiment for the newly formed Brigade "Lazio". On 24 May 1915, the day after Italy's entry into the war, the Brigade "Savona" was still at its bases in Caserta and Gaeta. On 15 June 1915, the brigade arrived at the Isonzo front and ten days later the brigade entered the front. The brigade crossed the Dottori canal and occupied Polazzo at the foot of the Karst plateau, which blocked the way to the city of Trieste. For the rest of the year the Brigade "Savona" participated in the Italian attempts to dislodge the Austro-Hungarian forces from the slopes and hills of the Karst plateau. From 23 June to 7 July 1915, during the First Battle of the Isonzo, the brigade attacked the first Austro-Hungarian line Southeast of Polazzo and suffered more than 1,900 casualties for little gain. Between 18 July and 3 August 1915, during the Second Battle of the Isonzo, the brigade renewed the attack against the Austro-Hungarian trenches East of Polazzo. During the Third Battle of the Isonzo, from 18 October to 3 November 1915, the brigade attacked the enemy trenches below Monte Sei Busi, but again made no inroads into the dense Austro-Hungarian trench system. As the brigade had lost 1,700 men in this attack it was sent to the Villa Vicentina in the rear.

After the brigade was brought back up to strength with fresh recruits it was sent to Albania to help evacuate the remnants of the Serbian Army, which had been defeated by Austro-Hungary, Germany, and Bulgaria in the Serbian campaign of 1915 and was forced to retreated with heavy losses into Albania. On 2 December 1915, the command of the Brigade "Savona" and the 15th Infantry Regiment disembarked in Vlorë in Southern Albania. The regiment then advanced to Durrës, where the evacuation of the remnants of the Serbian Army was underway. Meanwhile back in Italy, the depot of the 15th Infantry Regiment in Caserta formed the 218th Infantry Regiment, which on 23 March 1916 was assigned to the newly formed Brigade "Volturno".

At the end of January 1916, also the 16th Infantry Regiment arrived in Albania, where in early February the Austro-Hungarian forces began an offensive towards Durrës. On 23 February the Brigade "Savona" fell back to Durrës leaving the II Battalion of the 15th Infantry Regiment behind to fight to annihilation as rearguard. On 26 February 1916, the remaining troops of the brigade were evacuated from Durrës and the next day they arrived again in Vlorë to establish a new defensive line around this important port city in the South of Albania. By May 1916, the Italian XVI Corps in the area had grown to some 100,000 men and for the rest of 1916 and all of 1917 the front along the Vjosa river in Southern Albania became static with neither side willing to go on the offensive. Between March 1916 and June 1918, the Brigade "Savona" lost only 14 men due to enemy action.

On 17 February 1917, the depot of the 16th Infantry Regiment in Gaeta formed the command of the Brigade "Gaeta" and the 263rd Infantry Regiment for the new brigade, while the depot of the 15th Infantry Regiment in Caserta formed the 264th Infantry Regiment for the new brigade. The battalions for the two new regiments were drawn from six existing brigades (Brigade "Marche", Brigade "Ancona", Brigade "Macerata", Brigade "Perugia", Brigade "Volturno", and Brigade "Campania"), whose regiments each ceded two companies. On 7 July 1918, the Italian forces in Albania went on the offensive to push the Austro-Hungarian troops beyond the Seman river. On that day the 15th Infantry Regiment crossed the Vjosa river at Mollaj and attacked towards Mallakastër, while the next day the 16th Infantry Regiment's II Battalion and III Battalion crossed the Vjosa and attacked towards Fier. The few remaining Austro-Hungarian troops fled and on 9 July Italian forces reached the Seman river. After a short break the Italian units fell back to the hills South of the river, where they defeated heavy Austro-Hungarian counterattacks on 22 and 25 August 1918. In early October 1918, the Italian units observed large fires along the entire Austro-Hungarian line and patrols, which were sent forward to reconnoiter, reported that the Austro-Hungarian forces had burned their supplies and fled Albania.

After the war the 16th Infantry Regiment was awarded a Silver Medal of Military Valor for its conduct at Polazzo in 1915, in Durrës in 1916, and on the Seman river in 1918, while the 15th Infantry Regiment was awarded a Bronze Medal of Military Valor for its conduct at Polazzo and on Monte Sei Busi 1915. The two medals were affixed to the two regiments' flags and added to their coat of arms.

=== Interwar years ===
In 1919, the Brigade "Savona" moved to the newly annexed city of Zadar on the Dalmatian Coast. In 1921, the brigade left Zadar and the 15th Infantry Regiment returned to its base in Caserta, while the 16th Infantry Regiment returned to its base in Gaeta. On 4 November 1926, the Brigade "Savona" was disbanded and its two infantry regiments were renamed 15th Infantry Regiment "Savona" and 16th Infantry Regiment "Savona". On the same day the 15th Infantry Regiment "Savona" was assigned to the XXV Infantry Brigade, which also included the 31st Infantry Regiment "Siena" and 40th Infantry Regiment "Bologna", while the 16th Infantry Regiment "Savona" was assigned to the XXVII Infantry Brigade, which also included the 19th Infantry Regiment "Brescia" and 20th Infantry Regiment "Brescia". The XXV Infantry Brigade was the infantry component of the 25th Territorial Division of Naples, while the XXVII Infantry Brigade was the infantry component of the 27th Territorial Division of Catanzaro, which also included the 12th Field Artillery Regiment. After joining the XXVII Infantry Brigade, the 16th Infantry Regiment "Savona" moved from Gaeta to Monteleone Calabro and in 1928 the regiment moved to Cosenza.

=== Second Italo-Ethiopian War ===
In 1934, the 27th Territorial Division of Catanzaro changed its name to 27th Infantry Division "Sila". On 1 June 1935, the depot of the 16th Infantry Regiment "Savona" in Cosenza reformed the 132nd Infantry Regiment "Lazio", as replacement for the 16th Infantry Regiment "Savona", which, along with the rest of the 27th Infantry Division "Sila", was mobilized for the Second Italo-Ethiopian War. On 1 June 1935, the depot of the 20th Infantry Regiment "Brescia" in Reggio Calabria reformed the 244th Infantry Regiment "Cosenza", while the depot of the 12th Artillery Regiment in Capua reformed the 45th Artillery Regiment. The two reformed infantry regiments were assigned to the CXXVII Infantry Brigade, which was the infantry component of the 127th Infantry Division "Sila II". On 20 September 1935, the depot of the 19th Infantry Regiment "Brescia" in Catanzaro reformed the 243rd Infantry Regiment "Cosenza", which was also assigned to the CXXVII Infantry Brigade.

In summer 1935, the 27th Infantry Division "Sila" was shipped to Eritrea. On 3 October 1935, Italian forces invaded Ethiopia and the war began. In October 1935, the "Sila" division participated in the capture of Mek'ele. From 4 November 1935, the division was stationed in the Adigrat and in December 1935 it fought in the Ādī K’edawīt – Doghea pass area. On 19 January 1936, the Sila broke through the Ethiopian defenses and captured several towns in Tembien Province. The division did not participate in the nearby First Battle of Tembien and acted only in the final stages of Battle of Amba Aradam, capturing Āmba Ālagē on 26 February 1936. In March 1936, the Sila moved to Finarwa – Sek'ot'a region where it stayed until the end of war.

In fall 1936, the "Sila" division was repatriated. For their service in Ethiopia between 3 October 1935 and 5 May 1936, the division's infantry regiments were awarded, like all infantry units, which had participated in the war, a Military Order of Italy, which was affixed to the regiments' flags. Additionally, the 16th Infantry Regiment "Savona" was awarded a Silver Medal of Military Valour for the regiment's conduct during the Battle of Amba Aradam. On 15 November 1936, the 127th Infantry Division "Sila II" and its regiments were disbanded and the personnel of the disbanded units was assigned to the regiments of the 27th Infantry Division "Sila".

On 27 April 1939, the 55th Infantry Division "Savona" was formed in Salerno and the 15th Infantry Regiment "Savona" and 16th Infantry Regiment "Savona", as well as the 12th Artillery Regiment "Savona", were assigned to the new division. In September 1939, the "Savona" division was sent to Tripolitania in Libya.

=== World War II ===
At the outbreak of World War II, the 16th Infantry Regiment "Savona" consisted of a command, a command company, three fusilier battalions, a support weapons battery equipped with 65/17 infantry support guns, and a mortar company equipped with 81mm Mod. 35 mortars. From 10–25 June 1940, during the Italian invasion of France, the "Savona" division deployed along the French Tunisian-Italian Libyan border. After the signing of the Franco-Italian Armistice the division returned to its bases in ʽAziziya south-west of Tripoli.

In September 1940, during the Italian invasion of Egypt, and in December 1940, during the British Operation Compass counteroffensive, the "Savona" division remained at its bases. Only in June 1941, the division joined the Western Desert campaign and moved East to participate in the Siege of Tobruk. In August 1941, the division took up positions along the road from Bardia to Sollum and the Halfaya Pass. On 1 November 1941, the depot of the 16th Infantry Regiment "Savona" in Cosenza formed the 343rd Infantry Regiment "Forlì" as reinforcement for the 36th Infantry Division "Forlì", which was on occupation duty in Greece. The same month, November 1941, the "Savona" division added defensive positions at Sīdī ‘Umar in the Libyan desert, where the "Savona" division's troops clashed with British Eighth Army patrols.

On 18 November 1941, the British Eighth Army began Operation Crusader and attacked Axis positions from Bi’r Qirbah to Halfaya. On 22 and 23 November 1941, nearly 1,500 troops of the "Savona" division surrendered to British forces and two of the division's strong points were lost. The same day the "Savona" division counter-attacked and regained one of its two lost strong points. On 4 December 1941, as the Afrika Korps prepared to retreat to the Gazala Line, the "Savona" division was ordered to cover the Axis withdrawal by tying up British forces in the Bardia—Sollum—Halfaya sector for as long as possible. During the rest of the month the "Savona" division's supply situation deteriorated, with food, water and ammunition becoming scarce. On 2 January 1942, the garrison in Bardia surrendered and the remaining units of the division were now cut off from any possible retreat. Due to the lack of food and water and the impossibility to supply the "Savona" division by air the Italian General Staff allowed the remnants of the division in Sollum and Halfaya to surrender. On 17 January 1942, the 55th Infantry Division "Savona" and its regiments were declared lost due to wartime events.

For their conduct and sacrifice between 18 November 1941 and 17 January 1942, both infantry regiments of the 55th Infantry Division "Savona" were awarded a Silver Medal of Military Valor. The medals were affixed to the regiments' flags and added to the regiments' coats of arms.

=== Cold War ===
On 31 October 1974, the 89th Infantry Regiment "Salerno" and two of its battalion were disbanded. The next day, on 1 November 1974, the regiment's III Battalion in Albenga was renamed I Recruits Training Battalion "Salerno", while the regiment's IV Battalion in Savona was renamed II Recruits Training Battalion "Salerno". Both battalions consisted of a command, a command platoon, and three recruits companies. The traditions of the 89th Infantry Regiment "Salerno" were assigned to the I Recruits Training Battalion "Salerno", which also received the regiment's flag for safekeeping. On 31 July 1975, the I Recruits Training Battalion "Salerno" was disbanded and its three recruit companies became a detachment of the II Recruits Training Battalion "Salerno". The next day, on 1 August 1975, the II Recruits Training Battalion "Salerno" was assigned to the Armored Division "Ariete", as the division's recruits training battalion.

During the 1975 army reform the army disbanded the regimental level and newly independent battalions were granted for the first time their own flags. On 15 November 1975, the II Recruits Training Battalion "Salerno" in Savona was renamed 16th Infantry Battalion "Savona". The battalion consisted of a command, a command platoon, three recruit companies in Savona, and three recruit companies in Albenga. The battalion was tasked with training recruits destined for the Armored Division "Ariete". On 12 November 1976, the President of the Italian Republic Giovanni Leone assigned with decree 846 the flag and traditions of the 16th Infantry Regiment "Savona" to the 16th Infantry Battalion "Savona".

On 15 April 1977, the three detached recruit training companies in Albenga were formed into an autonomous battalion, which was designated 14th Bersaglieri Battalion "Sernaglia". Already on 14 March 1977 the President of the Italian Republic Giovanni Leone had issued decree 173, which assigned the flag and traditions of the 5th Bersaglieri Regiment to the new battalion.

In 1986 the Italian Army abolished the divisional level. Consequently the Armored Division "Ariete" was disbanded on 1 October 1986 and the 16th Infantry Battalion "Savona" was transferred to the Northwestern Military Region.

=== Recent times ===
With the end of the Cold War the Italian Army began to draw down its forces and on 31 May 1991 the 16th Infantry Battalion "Savona" was disbanded and the following 5 June the flag of the 16th Infantry Regiment "Savona" was transferred to the Shrine of the Flags in the Vittoriano in Rome.
