= Arturo Benigni =

Italian general (born 1890)

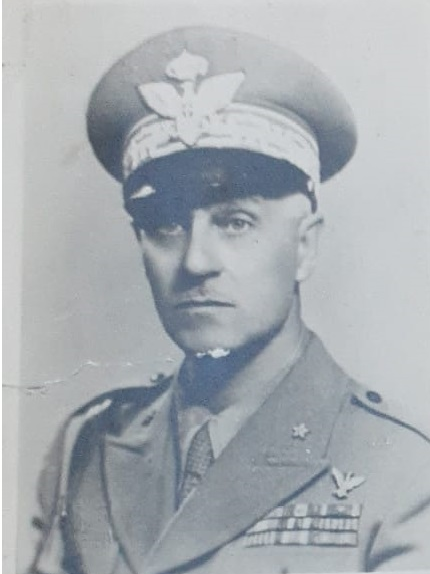
- Born: 20 January 1890; Mercogliano, Italy
- Died: 27 May 1961 (aged 71) Rome, Italy
- Allegiance: Kingdom of Italy (1901–1946); Italian Republic (1946–1947)
- Branch: Royal Italian Army
- Service years: 1909–1947
- Rank: Major General
- Commands: 12th Bersaglieri Regiment; 1st Infantry Division "Superga"
- Conflicts: Italo-Turkish War: World War I; World War II; Tunisian Campaign
- Spouse: Anna Alibrandi Valentini

Arturo Benigni (Mercogliano, 20 January 1890 – Rome, 27 May 1961) was an Italian general, veteran of the Royal Colonial Troops of Eritrea, of the Italo-Turkish War, of the First and Second World Wars. During the Second World War he participated in the Tunisian Campaign in command of the Divisional Infantry of the 1st Infantry Division "Superga". Decorated with the Knight's Cross of the Military Order of Savoy, Officer of the Military Order of Italy, and the Order of Merit of the German Eagle.

== Biography ==
In 1909 he began attending the Royal Military Academy of Modena, from which he graduated with the rank of 2nd lieutenant of the Bersaglieri, subsequently attending the School of Application. A volunteer in Eritrea, he was soon promoted to lieutenant and then captain. Returning to Italy in December 1915, he was assigned to the 29th Infantry Regiment and later to the 6th Bersaglieri Regiment. He was taken prisoner in May 1916 on Mount Meada during the Battles of Asiago Plateau and transferred to the Sigmundsherberg POW camp in Austria. During his captivity he was promoted to major. At the end of the conflict, he was assigned to the Armistice Commission in Vienna until the summer of 1919. Returning to the 6th Bersaglieri Regiment, he became its Adjutant Major. In 1926 he entered the War School in Turin and during the three-year period he was promoted to lieutenant colonel. He was later transferred to the 7th Bersaglieri Regiment, and in 1933 he became an instructor at the Central Infantry School in Civitavecchia, before returning to the regiment in 1935. Promoted to colonel in 1937, he became commander of the 12th Bersaglieri Regiment and subsequently commander of the Bersaglieri Reserve Officer Cadet School and the Bersaglieri Reserve NCO Cadet School in Pula. Promoted to brigadier general, in 1941 he became commander of the military zone of Istria. In 1942 he became commander of the 2nd Marching Brigade, part of the 8th Marching Infantry Division, and later commander of the divisional infantry of the Superga Division. In Tunisia he valiantly commanded the "Abschnitt Benigni" on the Kairouan front. Captured in May 1943 at the surrender of the Axis forces in Tunisia, with his commander Gen. Fernando Gelich, he was imprisoned in the prison camp of Saida in Algeria until the end of 1945. Returning to Italy, he was assigned to the Ministry of Defense and subsequently promoted to major general and placed in the reserve. He died in Rome on 27 May 1961.

== Awards and decorations ==
- Knight Military Order of Savoy — Regio Decreto 1 August 1941
- Order of Saints Maurice and Lazarus — Gazzetta Ufficiale 1 September1937
- Knight Military Order of Italy — Decreto del presidente della Repubblica 24 novembre 1947
- Officer Order of Saints Maurice and Lazarus — Regio Decreto 4 February 1942
- Commander Order of the Crown of Italy — Regio Decreto 14 November1935
- Commander Order of Merit of the Italian Republic — 30 December 1952
- Military Service Seniority Cross War Merit Cross
- Commemorative medal of the Italo-Turkish War
- Commemorative Medal of the Unification of Italy
- Order of Merit of the German Eagle
- Nichan Iftikhar

== Bibliography ==
(EN) Charles D. Pettibone, The Organization and Order of Battle of Militaries in World War II Volume VI Italy and France Including the Neutral Countries of San Marino, Vatican City (Holy See), Andorra, and Monaco, 2010, ISBN 1-4269-4633-3

(IT) Sogno, V. (s.d.). Il XXX Corpo d'Armata Italiano in Tunisia: relazione - Volume 2 of Operazioni Italo-Tedesche in Tunisia.

(IT) Messe, Giovanni.Come finì la guerra in Africa : la Prima Armata italiana in Tunisia, Rizzoli Editore, Milano, 1946.[1]
