= Curio Barbasetti di Prun =

Italian general

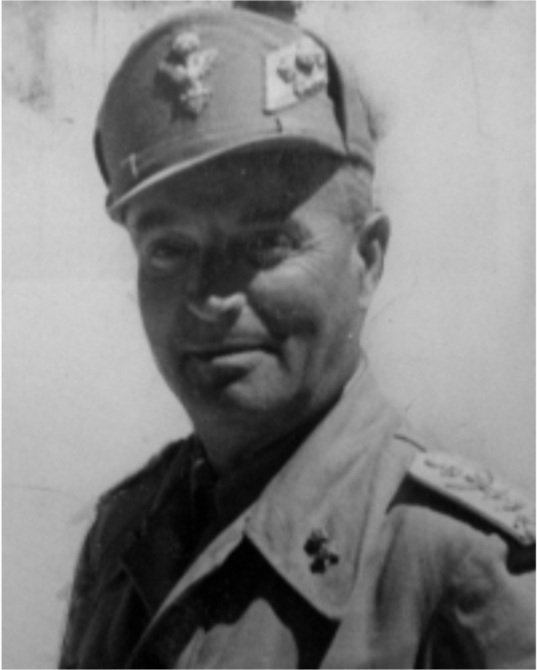
- Born: 12 March 1885; Orsara di Puglia, Italy
- Died: 4 December 1953 (aged 68); Orsara di Puglia, Italy
- Military career
- Allegiance: Kingdom of Italy
- Branch: Royal Italian Army
- Rank: Lieutenant General
- Commands: 18th Field Artillery Regiment; 1st Infantry Division Superga; I Army Corps; XIV Army Corps
- Conflicts: World War I; Battles of the Isonzo; World War II; Battle of the Alps; Battle of Gazala; 1st Battle of El Alamein; Battle of Alam Halfa; 2nd Battle of El Alamein
- Awards: Bronze Medal of Military Valour; War Cross for Military Valor; Military Order of Savoy; War Merit Cross; Order of the Crown of Italy

Curio Barbasetti, Count of Prun (12 March 1885 – 4 December 1953) was an Italian general during World War II, Chief of Staff of the Italian High Command in North Africa in 1942-1943 and Governor of Montenegro from July to September 1943.

== Biography ==
He was born in Orsara di Puglia on March 12, 1885, the son of Count Giovanni Barbasetti di Prun and Fulvia Bertoldi. He enlisted in the Royal Italian Army and enrolled at the Royal Military Academy of Artillery and Engineers in Turin, graduating with the rank of artillery second lieutenant. He was promoted to lieutenant on June 30, 1914, and fought with the 9th Infantry Division during World War I, earning a Bronze Medal of Military Valor. After serving as Chief of Staff of the Verona and Bolzano Army Corps, he commanded the 18th Field Artillery Regiment, and then became military attaché at the Italian Embassy in Paris. In 1936 he was promoted to brigadier general and given command of a mechanized brigade. On 1 October 1937, after serving for two months as deputy commander of the 5th Infantry Division Cosseria, he became head of the Italian Army War School, and on 7 May 1938 he was promoted to major general.

In 1939 he assumed command of the 1st Infantry Division Superga, which after Italy's entrance into World War II on 10 June 1940, participated in the brief offensive against France. In September 1940 he became commander of the 1st Army Corps, based in Turin. On January 1, 1942, he was promoted to lieutenant general, and on March 3 of the same year he was appointed Chief of Staff of the High Command in North Africa, replacing General Gastone Gambara, who had fallen out with the commander of Afrika Korps, General Erwin Rommel. In August 1942, following the changes in the organization of the hierarchical structure undertaken by Marshal Ugo Cavallero, he was placed at the head of Delease, the Delegation of the Italian Supreme Command in North Africa and its main liaison with Rommel.

In early 1943 he was repatriated and given command of the XIV Army Corps, stationed in Yugoslavia, and on 9 July 1943 he was appointed Governor of Montenegro, replacing General Alessandro Pirzio Biroli. After the Armistice of Cassibile he was captured by the Germans and imprisoned in Oflag 64/Z in Schokken, Poland, where he remained until its liberation by the Red Army in early 1945. He was then held in Ukraine until October of the same year, when he was allowed to return to Italy. He died on December 4, 1953.
