= 92nd Infantry Regiment "Basilicata" =

Inactive Italian Army infantry unit

- 92° Reggimento Fanteria "Basilicata"
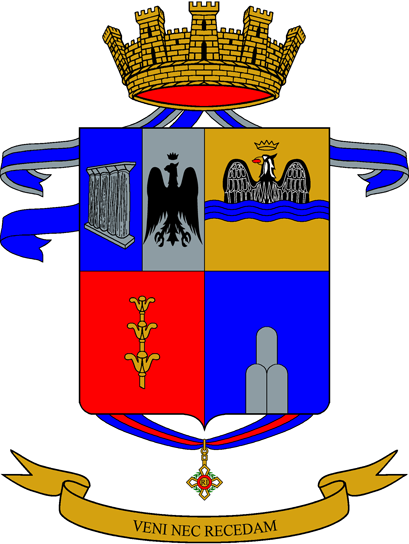
- Regimental coat of arms
- Active: 1 Nov. 1884 – 13 May 1943; 1 Oct. 1975 – 31 Oct. 1981; 3 Oct. 1982 – 30 June 1996
- Country: Italy
- Branch: Italian Army
- Garrison/HQ: Foligno
- Motto: "Veni nec recedam"
- Anniversaries: 20 November 1917 – Battle of Monte Tomba and Monfenera
- Decorations: 1× Military Order of Italy; 2× Silver Medals of Military Valor; 1× Bronze Medal of Military Valor

Insignia
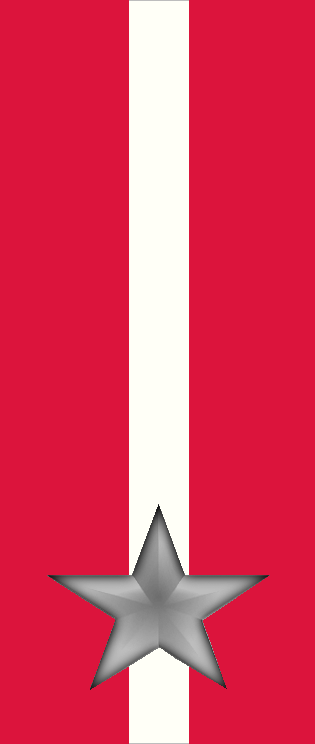
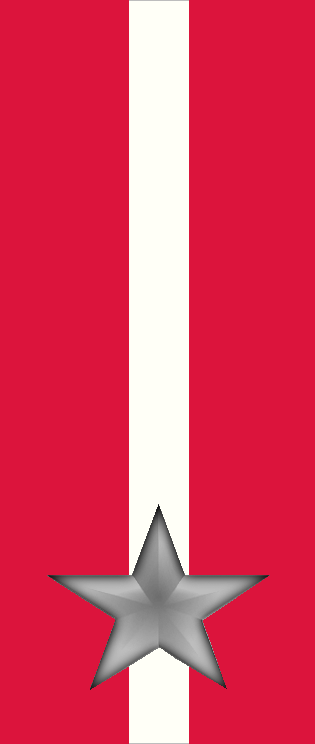
- Regimental gorget patches

The 92nd Infantry Regiment "Basilicata" (Italian: 92° Reggimento Fanteria "Basilicata") is an inactive unit of the Italian Army last based in Foligno. The regiment is named for the region of Basilicata and part of the Italian Army's infantry arm.

The regiment was one of sixteen infantry regiments formed on 1 November 1884. In World War I the regiment fought on the Italian front. During World War II the regiment was assigned to the 1st Infantry Division "Superga", with which it participated in the Italian invasion of France. In November 1942 the Superga division was sent to Tunisia, where it fought in the Tunisian Campaign until it surrendered to allied forces on 13 May 1943. In 1975 the regiment was reformed as a battalion sized training unit, which was disbanded in 1981. Reformed as a training battalion in 1982 the unit was reorganized as regiment in 1992. In 1996 the regiment was once more disbanded.

== History ==
=== Formation ===
On 1 November 1884 the 92nd Infantry Regiment (Brigade "Basilicata") was formed in Naples with companies ceded by the 16th Infantry Regiment (Brigade "Savona"), 20th Infantry Regiment (Brigade "Brescia"), 34th Infantry Regiment (Brigade "Livorno"), 36th Infantry Regiment (Brigade "Pistoia"), and 42nd Infantry Regiment (Brigade "Modena"). On the same day the 91st Infantry Regiment (Brigade "Basilicata") was formed in Naples with companies ceded by the 15th Infantry Regiment (Brigade "Savona"), 19th Infantry Regiment (Brigade "Brescia"), 33rd Infantry Regiment (Brigade "Livorno"), 35th Infantry Regiment (Brigade "Pistoia"), and 41st Infantry Regiment (Brigade "Modena"). Both regiments consisted of a staff and three battalions, with four companies per battalion. Together the two regiments formed the Brigade "Basilicata".

In 1895–96 the regiment provided six officers and 41 enlisted for units deployed to Italian Eritrea for the First Italo-Ethiopian War. In 1911–12 the regiment provided 26 officers and 1,194 enlisted to augment units fighting in the Italo-Turkish War.

=== World War I ===
At the outbreak of World War I, the Brigade "Basilicata" formed, together with the Brigade "Parma" and the 25th Field Artillery Regiment, the 1st Division. At the time the 92nd Infantry Regiment consisted of three battalions, each of which fielded four fusilier companies and one machine gun section. On 10 January 1915 the regimental depot of the 92nd Infantry Regiment in Turin formed the 161st Infantry Regiment (Brigade "Ivrea"). After Italy's entry into the war on 23 May 1915 the Brigade "Basilicata" was deployed to the Italian front: in July 1915 the brigade operated against Austro-Hungarian forces on the slopes of Monte Cavallino. On 4 August 1915 the I Battalion of the 92nd Infantry Regiment conquered the summit of Roteck in the upper Sexten valley, for which the regiment was awarded a Silver Medal of Military Valor. In October of the same year the brigade fought on Monte Sief and on the Col di Lana. In 1916 the brigade was deployed to the upper Boite valley and in June 1916 the brigade fought on the slopes of the Croda dell'Ancona.

In February 1917 the depot of the 92nd Infantry Regiment formed the 250th Infantry Regiment (Brigade "Pallanza"). In November 1917 the brigade was transferred to the Monte Grappa to block the Austro-Hungarian offensive on the Monte Grappa. The brigade fought at Pederobba, at Monfenera and on Monte Tomba. For holding the line at Monfenera and on Monte Tomba the two regiments of the Brigade "Basilicata" were both awarded a Silver Medal of Military Valor. In December 1917 the brigade moved to the Monte Asolone sector of the Monte Grappa front.

In June 1918 during the Second Battle of the Piave River the brigade defend Col Moschin on the Monte Grappa front. In July the brigade fought on Col del Miglio and in October during the Battle of Vittorio Veneto on Col Caprile, which are both located on the Monte Grappa massif. After the Austro-Hungarian defeat at Vittorio Veneto the Brigade advanced in the Val Cismon valley.

=== Interwar years ===
On 1 October 1926 the Brigade "Basilicata" was renamed I Infantry Brigade. The brigade was the infantry component of the 1st Territorial Division of Turin. On the same date the brigade's two infantry regiments were renamed 91st Infantry Regiment "Basilicata", respectively 92nd Infantry Regiment "Basilicata". The I Infantry Brigade also included the 90th Infantry Regiment "Salerno" from the disbanded Brigade "Salerno". On 30 October 1926 the 92nd Infantry Regiment "Basilicata" received a battalion from the disbanded 64th Infantry Regiment "Cagliari".

In 1934, the 1st Territorial Division of Turin changed its name to 1st Infantry Division "Superga". A name change that also extended to the division's infantry brigade. In 1935–36 the regiment formed, together with the 91st Infantry Regiment "Basilicata", a battalion of 30 officers and 1,002 enlisted as reinforcement for the 63rd Infantry Regiment "Cagliari", which was deployed to Eritrea for the Second Italo-Ethiopian War. On 5 April 1939 the I Infantry Brigade "Superga" was disbanded and the two infantry regiments came under direct command of the 1st Infantry Division "Superga". At the same time the two infantry regiments were renamed 91st Infantry Regiment "Superga", respectively 92nd Infantry Regiment "Superga".

=== World War II ===
At the outbreak of World War II the regiment consisted of a command, a command company, three fusilier battalions, a support weapons battery equipped with 65/17 infantry support guns, and a mortar company equipped with 81mm Mod. 35 mortars.

In June 1940 the Superga division participated in the invasion of France. On 23 November 1941 the Superga began was ordered to reorganize as an auto-transportable division for the planned invasion of Malta scheduled for summer 1942. After the invasion of Malta was canceled the division was sent to Tunisia during the Run for Tunis. By 20 November 1942 the division was assembling at Enfidaville Airfield. The division participated in the Tunisian Campaign until it was forced to surrender to Allied forces on 13 May 1943. For their service in Tunisia both infantry regiments of the Superga division were awarded a Bronze Medal of Military Valor.

=== Cold War ===
During the 1975 army reform the Italian Army disbanded the regimental level and newly independent battalions were granted for the first time their own flags. On 1 October 1975 the 92nd Infantry Battalion "Basilicata" was formed in Portogruaro and assigned the flag and traditions of the 92nd Infantry Regiment "Basilicata". The battalion was assigned to the 3rd Missile Brigade "Aquileia" as the brigade's recruits training battalion.

On 1 July 1981 the 92nd Recruits Training Center was formed in Foligno in the barracks of the disbanded Artillery Officer and Non-Commissioned Officer Cadets School. The center assumed the training tasks of the 92nd Infantry Battalion "Basilicata" and so on 31 October 1981 the battalion was disbanded its flag transferred to the custody of the commander of the 3rd Missile Brigade "Aquileia". On 3 October 1982 the 92nd Recruits Training Center in Foligno was reorganized and renamed 92nd Infantry Battalion "Basilicata".

On 1 June 1984 the battalion was transferred to the 12th Military Zone Command in Perugia, but the continued to train the recruits destined for the missile and heavy artillery units of the 3rd Missile Brigade "Aquileia".

=== Recent times ===
On 30 November 1991 the 3rd Missile Brigade "Aquileia" was disbanded and the battalion now trained recruits destined for a variety of artillery units. On 18 September 1992 the 92nd Infantry Battalion "Basilicata" lost its autonomy and the next day the battalion entered the reformed 92nd Regiment "Basilicata", which continued the training duties of the battalion.

On 30 June 1996 the regiment was disbanded and on 3 October 1996 the flag of the 92nd Infantry Regiment "Basilicata" was transferred to the Shrine of the Flags in the Vittoriano in Rome.
