= 91st Infantry Regiment "Basilicata" =

Inactive Italian Army infantry unit

- 91° Reggimento Fanteria "Basilicata"
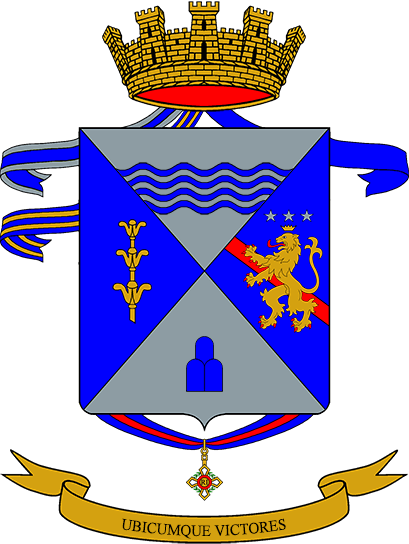
- Regimental coat of arms
- Active: 1 Nov. 1884 – 13 May 1943; 1 Feb. 1977 – 18 Nov. 2009
- Country: Italy
- Branch: Italian Army
- Garrison/HQ: Potenza
- Motto: "Ubicumque victores"
- Anniversaries: 18 November 1917 – Battle of Monfenera
- Decorations: 1× Military Order of Italy; 1× Silver Medal of Military Valor; 1× Bronze Medal of Military Valor; 1× Silver Medal of Army Valor

Insignia
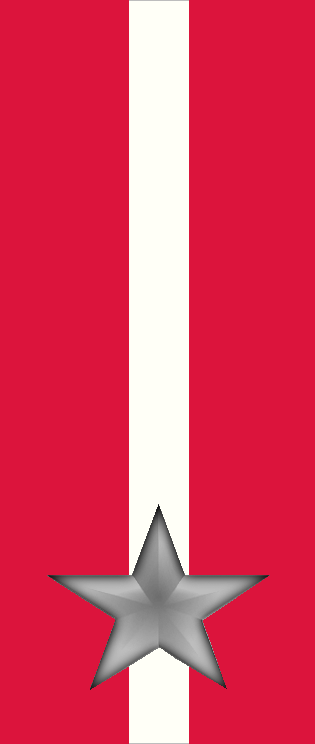
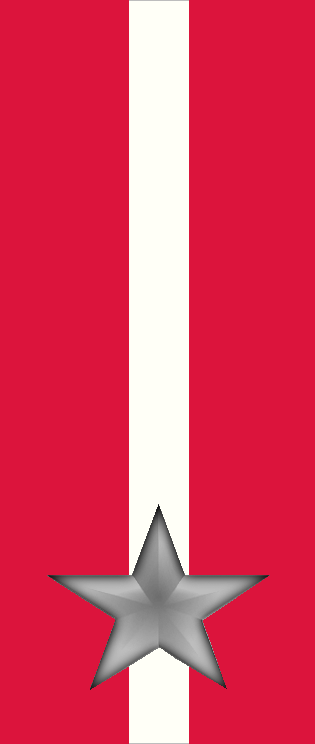
- Regimental gorget patches

The 91st Infantry Regiment "Basilicata" (Italian: 91° Reggimento Fanteria "Basilicata") is an inactive unit of the Italian Army last based in Potenza. The regiment is named for the region of Basilicata and part of the Italian Army's infantry arm.

The regiment was one of sixteen infantry regiments formed on 1 November 1884. In World War I the regiment fought on the Italian front. During World War II the regiment was assigned to the 1st Infantry Division "Superga", with which it participated in the Italian invasion of France. In November 1942 the Superga division was sent to Tunisia, where it fought in the Tunisian Campaign until it surrendered to allied forces on 13 May 1943. In 1977 the regiment was reformed as a battalion sized training unit, which was active until 2009.

== History ==
=== Formation ===
On 1 November 1884 the 91st Infantry Regiment (Brigade "Basilicata") was formed in Naples with companies ceded by the 15th Infantry Regiment (Brigade "Savona"), 19th Infantry Regiment (Brigade "Brescia"), 33rd Infantry Regiment (Brigade "Livorno"), 35th Infantry Regiment (Brigade "Pistoia"), and 41st Infantry Regiment (Brigade "Modena"). On the same day the 92nd Infantry Regiment (Brigade "Basilicata") was formed in Naples with companies ceded by the 16th Infantry Regiment (Brigade "Savona"), 20th Infantry Regiment (Brigade "Brescia"), 34th Infantry Regiment (Brigade "Livorno"), 36th Infantry Regiment (Brigade "Pistoia"), and 42nd Infantry Regiment (Brigade "Modena"). Both regiments consisted of a staff and three battalions, with four companies per battalion. Together the two regiments formed the Brigade "Basilicata".

In 1887 the regiment's 7th Company participated in the Italo-Ethiopian War of 1887–1889. In 1895–96 the regiment provided five officers and 41 enlisted for units deployed to Italian Eritrea for the First Italo-Ethiopian War. In 1911–12 the regiment provided 26 officers and 1,194 enlisted to augment units fighting in the Italo-Turkish War.

=== World War I ===
At the outbreak of World War I, the Brigade "Basilicata" formed, together with the Brigade "Parma" and the 25th Field Artillery Regiment, the 1st Division. At the time the 91st Infantry Regiment consisted of three battalions, each of which fielded four fusilier companies and one machine gun section. After Italy's entry into the war on 23 May 1915 the Brigade "Basilicata" was deployed to the Italian front: in July 1915 the brigade operated against Austro-Hungarian forces on the slopes of Monte Cavallino. In October of the same year the brigade fought on Monte Sief and on the Col di Lana. In 1916 the brigade was deployed to the upper Boite valley and in June 1916 the brigade fought on the slopes of the Croda dell'Ancona.

In November 1917 the brigade was transferred to the Monte Grappa to block the Austro-Hungarian offensive on the Monte Grappa. The brigade fought at Pederobba, at Monfenera and on Monte Tomba. For holding the line at Monfenera and on Monte Tomba the two regiments of the Brigade "Basilicata" were both awarded a Silver Medal of Military Valor. In December 1917 the brigade moved to the Monte Asolone sector of the Monte Grappa front.

In June 1918 during the Second Battle of the Piave River the brigade defend Col Moschin on the Monte Grappa front. In July the brigade fought on Col del Miglio and in October during the Battle of Vittorio Veneto on Col Caprile, which are both located on the Monte Grappa massif. After the Austro-Hungarian defeat at Vittorio Veneto the Brigade advanced in the Val Cismon valley.

=== Interwar years ===
On 1 October 1926 the Brigade "Basilicata" was renamed I Infantry Brigade. The brigade was the infantry component of the 1st Territorial Division of Turin. On the same date the brigade's two infantry regiments were renamed 91st Infantry Regiment "Basilicata" respectively 92nd Infantry Regiment "Basilicata". The I Infantry Brigade also included the 90th Infantry Regiment "Salerno" from the disbanded Brigade "Salerno". On 15 November 1926 the 91st Infantry Regiment "Basilicata" received a battalion from the disbanded 87th Infantry Regiment "Friuli".

In 1934, the 1st Territorial Division of Turin changed its name to 1st Infantry Division "Superga". A name change that also extended to the division's infantry brigade. In 1935–36 the regiment formed, together with the 92nd Infantry Regiment "Basilicata", a battalion of 30 officers and 1,002 enlisted as reinforcement for the 63rd Infantry Regiment "Cagliari", which was deployed to Eritrea for the Second Italo-Ethiopian War. On 5 April 1939 the I Infantry Brigade "Superga" was disbanded and the two infantry regiments came under direct command of the 1st Infantry Division "Superga". At the same time the two infantry regiments were renamed 91st Infantry Regiment "Superga", respectively 92nd Infantry Regiment "Superga".

=== World War II ===
At the outbreak of World War II the regiment consisted of a command, a command company, three fusilier battalions, a support weapons battery equipped with 65/17 infantry support guns, and a mortar company equipped with 81mm Mod. 35 mortars.

In June 1940 the Superga division participated in the invasion of France. On 23 November 1941 the Superga began was ordered to reorganize as an auto-transportable division for the planned invasion of Malta scheduled for summer 1942. After the invasion of Malta was canceled the division was sent to Tunisia during the Run for Tunis. By 20 November 1942 the division was assembling at Enfidaville Airfield. The division participated in the Tunisian Campaign until it was forced to surrender to Allied forces on 13 May 1943. For their service in Tunisia both infantry regiments of the Superga division were awarded a Bronze Medal of Military Valor.

=== Cold War ===
During the 1975 army reform the Italian Army disbanded the regimental level and newly independent battalions were granted for the first time their own flags. On 14 November 1975 the 48th Infantry Regiment "Ferrara" was disbanded and the next day the regiment's IV Battalion in Cosenza was renamed 244th Infantry Battalion "Cosenza" and assigned the flag and traditions of the 244th Infantry Regiment "Cosenza". On the same date the Ferrara's III Battalion in Potenza was reduced to a detachment of the 244th Infantry Battalion "Cosenza", which consisted of a command, a command platoon, and four recruits training companies, two of which were detached in Potenza.

On 1 February 1977 the detachment in Potenza became an autonomous unit and was renamed 91st Infantry Battalion "Lucania". To avoid confusion with the 92nd Infantry Battalion "Basilicata" the battalion's name was changed from "Basilicata" to "Lucania", which is the historic name of Basilicata region. On 14 March 1977 the President of the Italian Republic Giovanni Leone issued decree 173, which assigned the flag and traditions of the 91st Infantry Regiment "Basilicata" to the battalion. The battalion was assigned to the Southern Military Region and consisted of a command, a command platoon, and two recruits training companies.

For its conduct and work after the 1980 Irpinia earthquake the battalion was awarded a Silver Medal of Army Valor, which was affixed to the battalion's flag.

On 1 January 1985 the battalion was reorganized and renamed 91st Motorized Infantry Battalion "Lucania" and consisted now of a command, a command and services company, a motorized company, and a heavy mortar company equipped with towed 120mm Mod. 63 mortars. On 1 December 1987 the reorganization was complete and the battalion new fielded three motorized companies.

=== Recent times ===
On 1 January 1991 the 91st Motorized Infantry Battalion "Lucania" resumed its duties as a recruits training unit and was renamed 91st Infantry Battalion "Lucania". On 1 July 1991 the battalion was assigned to the Bersaglieri Brigade "Garibaldi" as the brigade's recruits training battalion. In 1993 the battalion was renamed 91st Battalion "Lucania".

On 1 October 1997 the battalion was transferred to the Southern Military Region and on 1 January 1999 to the 2nd Defense Forces Command. On 18 November 2009 the battalion was disbanded and the flag of the 91st Infantry Regiment "Basilicata" was transferred to the Shrine of the Flags in the Vittoriano in Rome.
