= Avče Pumped Storage Plant =

Coordinates: 46°5′1.89″N 13°39′59.94″E

The Avče Pumped Storage Plant (Slovene: Črpalna Hidroelektrarna Avče, abbreviated ČHE Avče) is a pumped-storage power plant near the village of Avče in western Slovenia. The power plant was completed in June 2009 and it was put into commercial use in April 2010. The main building contractor was Primorje Ajdovščina. The powerplant is the first of its kind in Slovenia.

It pumps water from a height of 105 metres (344 ft) above sea level near the village of Avče to a height of 625 metres (2,051 ft). The reservoir is close to the village of Kanalski Vrh, and it holds a little over 2 million cubic meters of water. The generator generates 185 megawatts (248,000 hp) when producing electricity and uses 180 megawatts (240,000 hp) when pumping water. The same turbine is used for pumping and generating electricity.

The efficiency of the process is 77%, which means it is profitable to operate when the electricity generated costs 30% more. The reservoir has the capacity to operate for 15 hours at full power, and the discharge rate is around 40 cubic meters per second. The plant was designed to operate from 6 to 10 hours at a time, usually filling the reservoir at the end of the week. The cost of the Avče pumped storage plant was €122 million.
