= Logistic Battalion "Brescia" =

Inactive Italian Army brigade logistics unit

- Battaglione Logistico "Brescia"
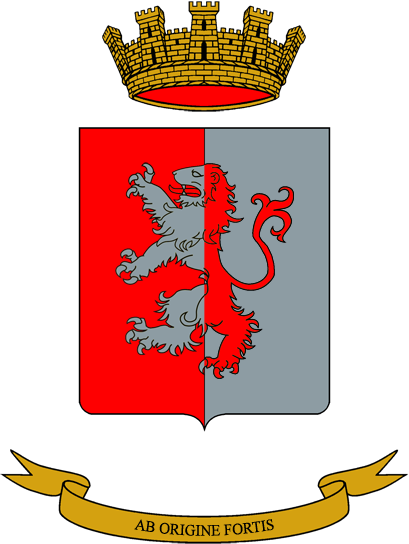
- Battalion coat of arms
- Active: 1 Oct. 1975 — 30 Oct. 1991
- Country: Italy
- Branch: Italian Army
- Type: Military logistics
- Part of: Mechanized Brigade "Brescia"
- Garrison/HQ: Montorio Veronese
- Motto(s): "Ab origine fortis"
- Anniversaries: 22 May 1916 - Battle of Asiago

Insignia
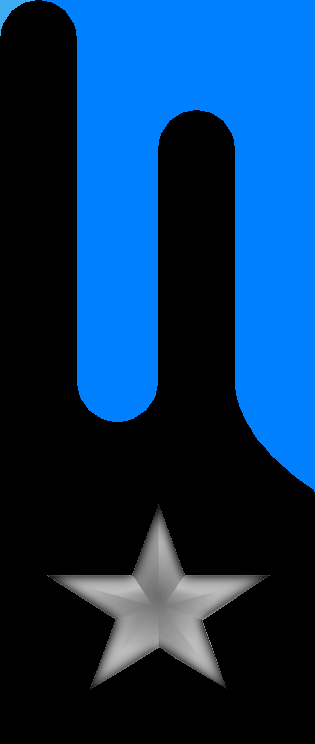
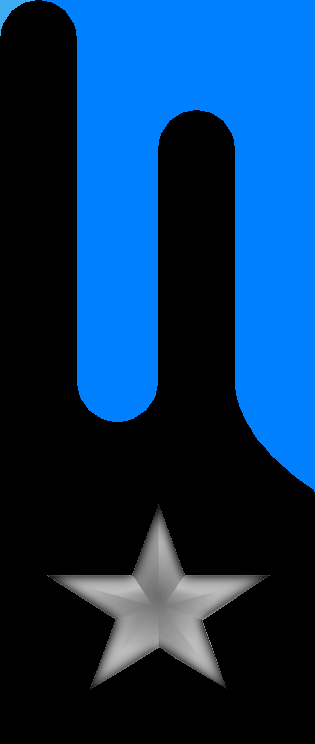
- Unit gorget patches

The Logistic Battalion "Brescia" (Italian: Battaglione Logistico "Brescia") is an inactive military logistics battalion of the Italian Army, which was assigned to the Mechanized Brigade "Brescia". The battalion's anniversary falls, as for all units of the Italian Army's Transport and Materiel Corps, on 22 May, the anniversary of the Royal Italian Army's first major use of automobiles to transport reinforcements to the Asiago plateau to counter the Austro-Hungarian Asiago Offensive in May 1916.

== History ==
The battalion is the spiritual successor of the logistic units of the Royal Italian Army's 27th Infantry Division "Sila", which fought in the Second Italo-Ethiopian War and was renamed on 24 May 1939 27th Infantry Division "Brescia". The "Brescia" division fought in the Western Desert campaign in North Africa, during which the division was destroyed on 7 November 1942 in the Second Battle of El Alamein.

=== Cold War ===
As part of the 1975 army reform the units of the Infantry Division "Legnano" were reorganized and on 21 October 1975, the Mechanized Brigade "Brescia" was formed in the city of Brescia. Already on 1 October of the same year, the Logistic Battalion "Brescia" had been formed in Montorio Veronese for the new brigade. Initially the battalion consisted of a command, a command platoon, a supply and transport company, a medium workshop, and a vehicle park. At the time the battalion fielded 692 men (38 officers, 85 non-commissioned officers, and 569 soldiers).

On 12 November 1976, the President of the Italian Republic Giovanni Leone granted with decree 846 the battalion a flag.

In 1981, the battalion was reorganized and consisted afterwards of the following units:

- Logistic Battalion "Brescia", in Brescia
  - Command and Services Company
  - Supply Company
  - Maintenance Company
  - Medium Transport Company
  - Medical Unit (Reserve)

=== Recent times ===
After the end of the Cold War the Italian Army began to draw down its forces. Consequently, on 27 July 1991, the Mechanized Brigade "Brescia" was disbanded, followed on 30 October 1991, by the Logistic Battalion "Brescia". On 7 November of the same year, the battalion's flag was transferred to the Shrine of the Flags in the Vittoriano in Rome for safekeeping.

== See also ==
- Military logistics
