= Mechanized Brigade "Brescia" =

Brigata Meccanizzata "Brescia"
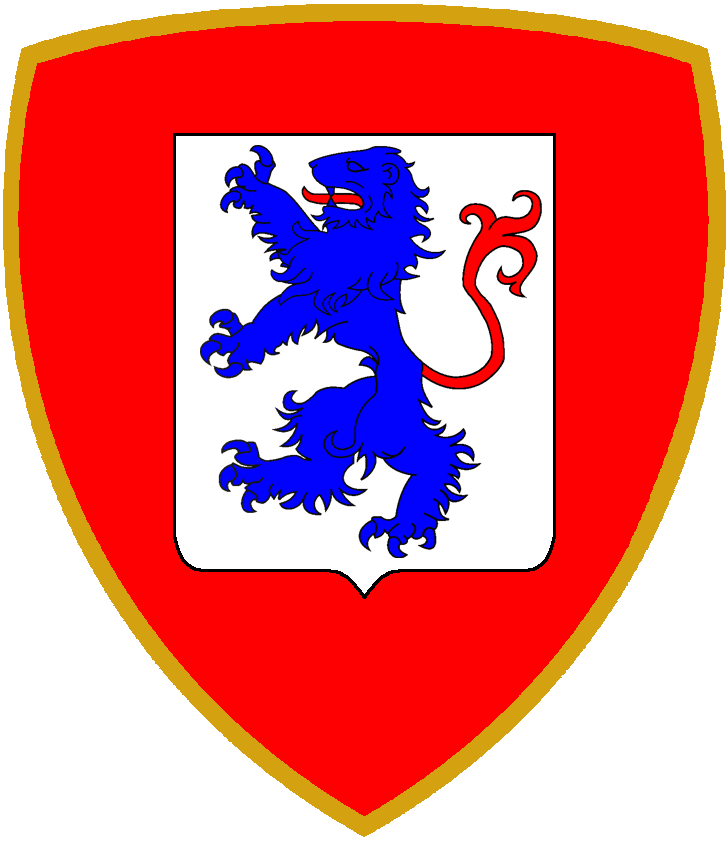
- Coat of Arms of the Mechanized Brigade "Brescia"
- Active: 1 November 1859 – 1939; 21 October 1975 – 27 July 1991
- Country: Italy
- Branch: Italian Army
- Type: Infantry
- Role: Armored warfare
- Part of: 1975–1986 Mechanized Division "Mantova"; 1986–1991 3rd Army Corps
- Garrison/HQ: Brescia
- Engagements: World War I World War II; Cold War

The Mechanized Brigade "Brescia" was a mechanized brigade of the Italian Army. Its core units were mechanized infantry battalions. The brigade was founded in, named after, and headquartered in the city of Brescia and accordingly the brigade's coat of arms was modeled after the city's coat of arms.

== History ==
=== Constitution ===
The Brigade "Brescia" was first formed with the 19th Infantry Regiment and 20th Infantry Regiment on 1 November 1859 in Bergamo. Along with the Brigade "Cremona" in Brescia and the 6th Field Artillery Regiment it formed the 6th Division of the Line. During the Third Italian War of Independence the Brescia was paired with the Brigade "Valtellina" to form the 5th Division of the Line, which fought in the Battle of Custoza. The brigade participated in the Capture of Rome and then saw service in the Italian colonial wars: the First Italo-Ethiopian War and the Italo-Turkish War.

=== World War I ===
During World War I the brigade fought on the Italian Front and was awarded the Military Order of Italy for its conduct during the Eleventh Battle of the Isonzo on the Banjšice Plateau. In 1918 the brigade was sent to the Western Front in France and fought there during the Hundred Days Offensive. At the end of the war the brigade had reached Rimogne.

=== World War II ===
In 1926 the brigade received the 16th Infantry Regiment "Savona" and became the infantry component of the 27th Infantry Division "Sila". The same year the brigade was renamed as XXVII Infantry Brigade. In 1935-36 the brigade was employed in Ethiopia during the Second Italo-Abyssinian War.

In 1939 the brigade lost the 16th Infantry Regiment "Savona" and was renamed 27th Infantry Division "Brescia". This binary division consisted of only two infantry regiments (19th and 20th) and the 55th Field Artillery Regiment. The division participated in the Western Desert Campaign, distinguishing itself during the Siege of Tobruk. The division was completely destroyed during the Second Battle of El Alamein.

=== Cold War ===
The brigade was reactivated during the Italian Army 1975 reform, with which the regimental level was abolished and battalions came under direct command of newly formed multi-arms brigades. On 21 October 1975 the Infantry Division "Legnano" was split into the Mechanized Brigade "Legnano" and the reactivated Mechanized Brigade "Brescia". The 67th Infantry Regiment "Legnano" in Montorio Veronese became the core of the reactivated brigade, which was brought to full strength by adding the 13th Tank Battalion "M.O. Pascucci" in Cordenons from the disbanded 182nd Armored Infantry Regiment "Garibaldi" of the Infantry Division "Folgore", the 20th Mechanized Infantry Battalion "Monte San Michele" in Brescia from the disbanded 68th Infantry Regiment "Legnano" in Bergamo of the "Legnano" Division, and the 52nd Self-propelled Field Artillery Group "Venaria" in Brescia from the disbanded 52nd Heavy Artillery Regiment, which had been part of 3rd Army Corps' Artillery Command.

Together with the Mechanized Brigade "Isonzo" and Armored Brigade "Pozzuolo del Friuli", the Brescia became part of the Mechanized Division "Mantova". The Mantova, based in Udine in North-Eastern Italy, was part of the 5th Army Corps, which was tasked with defending the Yugoslav-Italian border against attacks by either the Warsaw Pact, or Yugoslavia, or both. The Brescia's authorized strength was 4,760 men (272 Officers, 630 non-commissioned officers and 3,858 soldiers) and it was initially composed by the following units:

- Mechanized Brigade "Brescia", in Brescia
  - Command and Signal Unit "Brescia", in Brescia
  - 20th Mechanized Infantry Battalion "Monte San Michele", in Brescia
  - 30th Mechanized Infantry Battalion "Pisa", in Montorio Veronese
  - 85th Mechanized Infantry Battalion "Verona", in Montorio Veronese
  - 13th Tank Battalion "M.O. Pascucci", in Cordenons (Leopard 1A2 main battle tanks)
  - 52nd Field Artillery Group "Venaria", in Brescia (M114 155mm towed howitzers)
  - Logistic Battalion "Brescia", in Montorio Veronese
  - Anti-tank Company "Brescia", in Montorio Veronese (BGM-71 TOW anti-tank guided missiles)
  - Engineer Company "Brescia", in Brescia

On 1 October 1986 the Italian Army abolished the divisional level and brigades, that until then had been under one of the Army's four divisions, came forthwith under direct command of the Army's 3rd or 5th Army Corps. The Brescia along with the Mechanized Brigade "Trieste" came under the 3rd Army Corps. On the same date the 13th Tank Battalion "M.O. Pascucci" was transferred to the Armored Brigade "Ariete" and replaced by the 15th Cavalry Reconnaissance Squadrons Group "Cavalleggeri di Lodi" in Lenta of the disbanded Armored Division "Centauro". The "Cavalleggeri di Lodi" was armed with Leopard 1A2 main battle tanks and M113 armored personnel carriers, and was reorganized in 1987 as 15th Tank Squadrons Group "Cavalleggeri di Lodi".

After the end of the Cold War the Italian Army began to draw down its forces and the Brescia was one of the first brigades to be disbanded. On 27 July 1991 the brigade was officially deactivated along with most of its subordinate units. While the 52nd Field Artillery Group "Venaria" joined the Mechanized Brigade "Legnano" and the Cavalleggeri di Lodi joined the 3rd Army Corps.
