= Delease =

Colonial division of Italian Armed Forces

Delease (Delegazione Africa Settentrionale, North Africa Delegation) was a colonial body of the Supreme Command of the Italian Armed Forces, with headquarters in Tobruk and jurisdiction over North Africa, during the Second World War, which served as liaison between the tactical command of Panzer Army Africa and the Italian Supreme Command in Rome, and managed its logistics.

Delease was commanded by Curio Barbasetti who had won the esteem of Erwin Rommel. As of 23 October 1942 it had the functions of an army command, to which three army corps commands were subordinated, Delease1 (Tripoli, responsible for the logistics of Tripolitania), Delease2 (Benghazi, responsible for the logistics of Cyrenaica) and Delease3 (Marsa Matruh, responsible for the logistics of the three army corps at the front), as well as the command of the North Africa Intendency, under General Vittorio Palma.

Delease ceased to function on 16 November 1942, after the retreat following the Second Battle of El Alamein, and its functions were transferred to Superlibia, the High Command in Libya.
