= Avče =

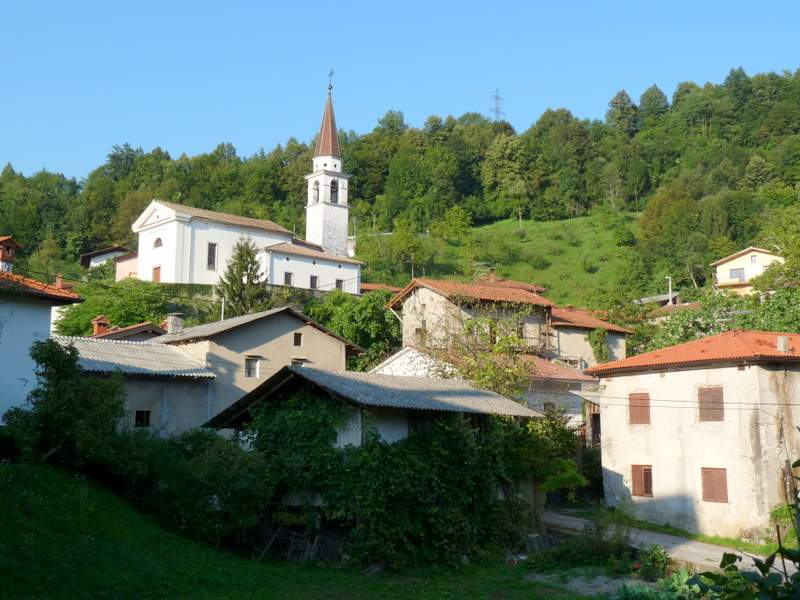
- Interactive map of Avče
- Location in Slovenia
- Coordinates: 46°6′6″N 13°41′1″E
- Country: Slovenia
- Traditional region: Littoral
- Statistical region: Gorizia
- Municipality: Kanal ob Soči

Area
  - Total: 10.23 km^{2} (3.95 sq mi)
- Elevation: 172 m (564 ft)

Population (2002)
  - Total: 293

Avče (pronounced [ˈaːu̯tʃɛ], Italian: Auzza) is a settlement on the left bank of the Soča River in the Municipality of Kanal ob Soči in the Littoral region of Slovenia. It includes the hamlets of Dolnji Avšček, Gor(e)nji Avšček, and Langa along Avšček Creek southeast of the main settlement, Nadavče to the west, and Spodnji Log and Vrtače to the north along the railroad.

== Name ==
Avče was first attested in written sources in 1389 as Als (and as Alis in 1523, and Auzha and Auza in 1763–87). The name is derived from *Alьčь, probably related to the Friulian hydronym Auzza or Aussa, which is of pre-Romance origin. It may ultimately be derived from Celtic *alika 'wild service tree' or from some other pre-Romance root meaning 'spring'.

== History ==
Renovation of Saint Martin's Church has revealed artifacts from the Roman era, testifying to early settlement of the site.

On 31 March 1908, the first confirmed meteorite in the area of the modern Slovenia fell near the village of Avče. Its name is Avce. It weighs 1,230 grams (43 oz) and is a hexahedrite, composed primarily of iron. It is kept at the Vienna Natural History Museum.

Avče was partially destroyed during the First World War during the Italian advance to the western part of the Banjšice Plateau. There is an Austrian memorial plaque in Podlajša dedicated to the Austro-Hungarian units that served there, and in the Avče cemetery there is a dilapidated Italian war memorial.

During the Second World War, an Italian (and later German) military post was located in Avče to protect the railroad from Jesenice to Gorizia. The post was attached by the Partisans on 26 October 1943 and the entire contingent stationed there was captured. There were further attacks in January and June 1944, and the bridges across Avšček and Avščica creeks were destroyed. The Partisans had a base on the Osojnica Ridge south of the settlement, from which they carried out attacks on German positions. On 28 March 1944 the Germans captured Jožef Škodnik, a leader in the communist-led resistance, and hanged him in the middle of the village. A memorial plaque on the Škodnik house commemorates the event.

== Church ==
The parish church in the settlement is dedicated to Saint Martin and belongs to the Diocese of Koper. The Gothic chancel of the church contains frescoes dating to the 15th century.

A second church above the village in the hamlet of Nadavče is dedicated to Our Lady of the Snows. It contains frescos painted by Jernej of Loka. It is a pilgrimage church and was first mentioned in written sources in 1497. The construction of the church began in the late 15th century, and the chancel was vaulted in 1515. It has a Baroque marble altar with three sculptures dating to circa 1520, and also three gilded altars. The free-standing bell tower of the church is believed to be a Roman tower, and a key to the bell tower dating from 1515 has been preserved.

== Hydroelectric plant ==
The Avče Pumped Storage Plant is the first pumped-storage hydroelectric power plant in Slovenia.

== Notable people ==
Notable people that were born or lived in Avče include:

- Ivan Kovačič (1873–1936), folk storyteller and poet
