= Rimogne =

- Commune
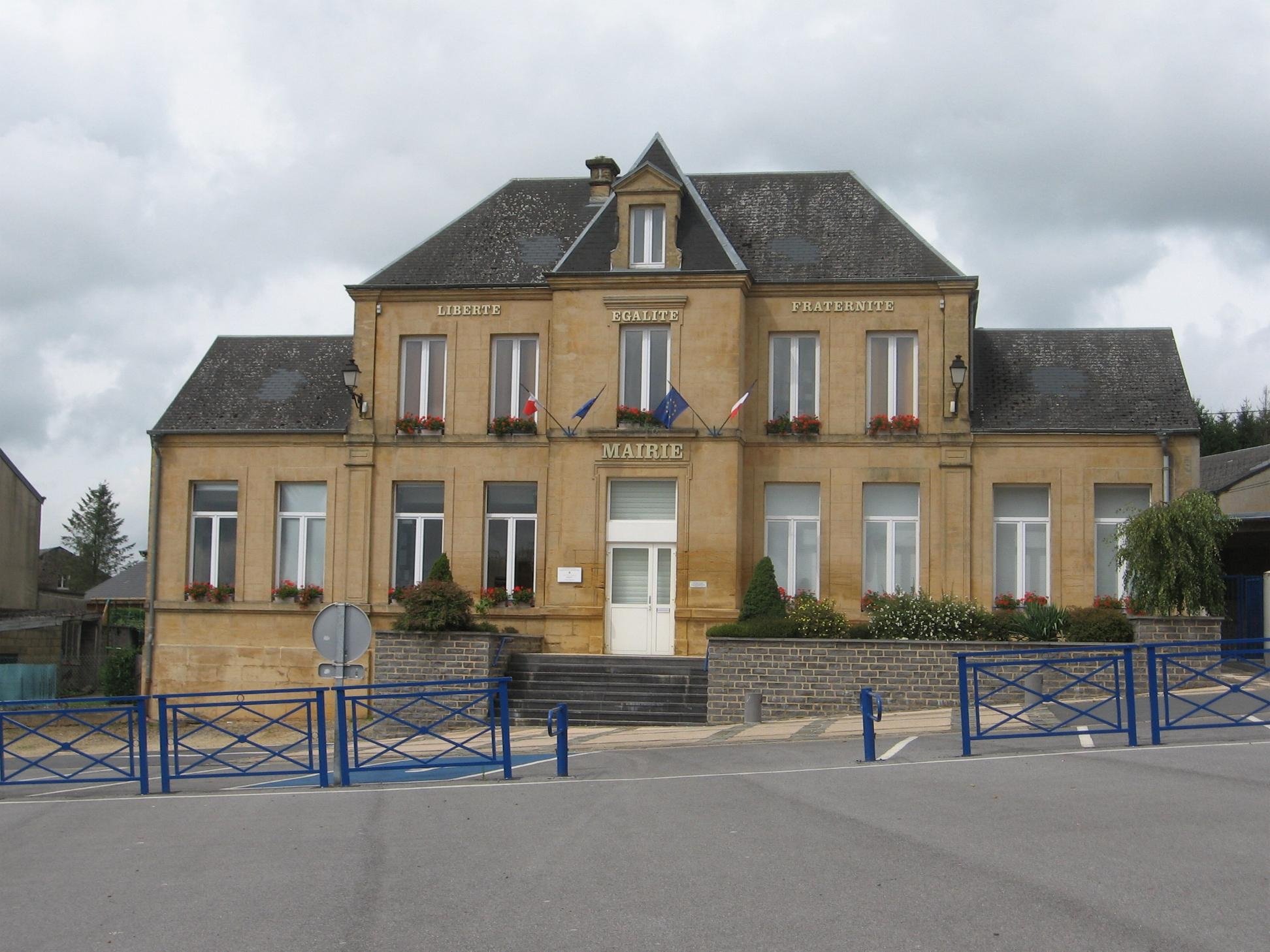
- Town hall

- Coat of arms
- Location of Rimogne
- Location within France Location within Grand Est
- Coordinates: 49°50′29″N 4°32′19″E
- Country: France
- Region: Grand Est
- Department: Ardennes
- Arrondissement: Charleville-Mézières
- Canton: Rocroi
- Intercommunality: Vallées et Plateau d'Ardenne

Government
  - Mayor (2020–2026): Yannick Rossato
- Area^{1}: 3.77 km^{2} (1.46 sq mi)
- Elevation: 252 m (827 ft)
- Highest elevation: 282 m (925 ft)
- Lowest elevation: 194 m (636 ft)
- Population (2023): 1,317
  - Density: 349/km^{2} (905/sq mi)
- Time zone: UTC+01:00 (CET)
  - Summer (DST): UTC+02:00 (CEST)
- INSEE/Postal code: 08365 /08150
- ^{1} French Land Register data, which excludes lakes, ponds, glaciers > 1 km^{2} (0.386 sq mi or 247 acres) and river estuaries.

Rimogne (French pronunciation: [ʁimɔɲ]) is a commune in the Ardennes department in northern France.

== Population ==
Historical population
Year	Pop.	±% p.a.
1968	1,477	—
1975	1,327	−1.52%
1982	1,388	+0.64%
1990	1,323	−0.60%
1999	1,416	+0.76%
2007	1,423	+0.06%
2012	1,430	+0.10%
2017	1,383	−0.67%
2023	1,317	−0.81%
Source: INSEE

== See also ==
- Communes of the Ardennes department
