= Military Order of Savoy =

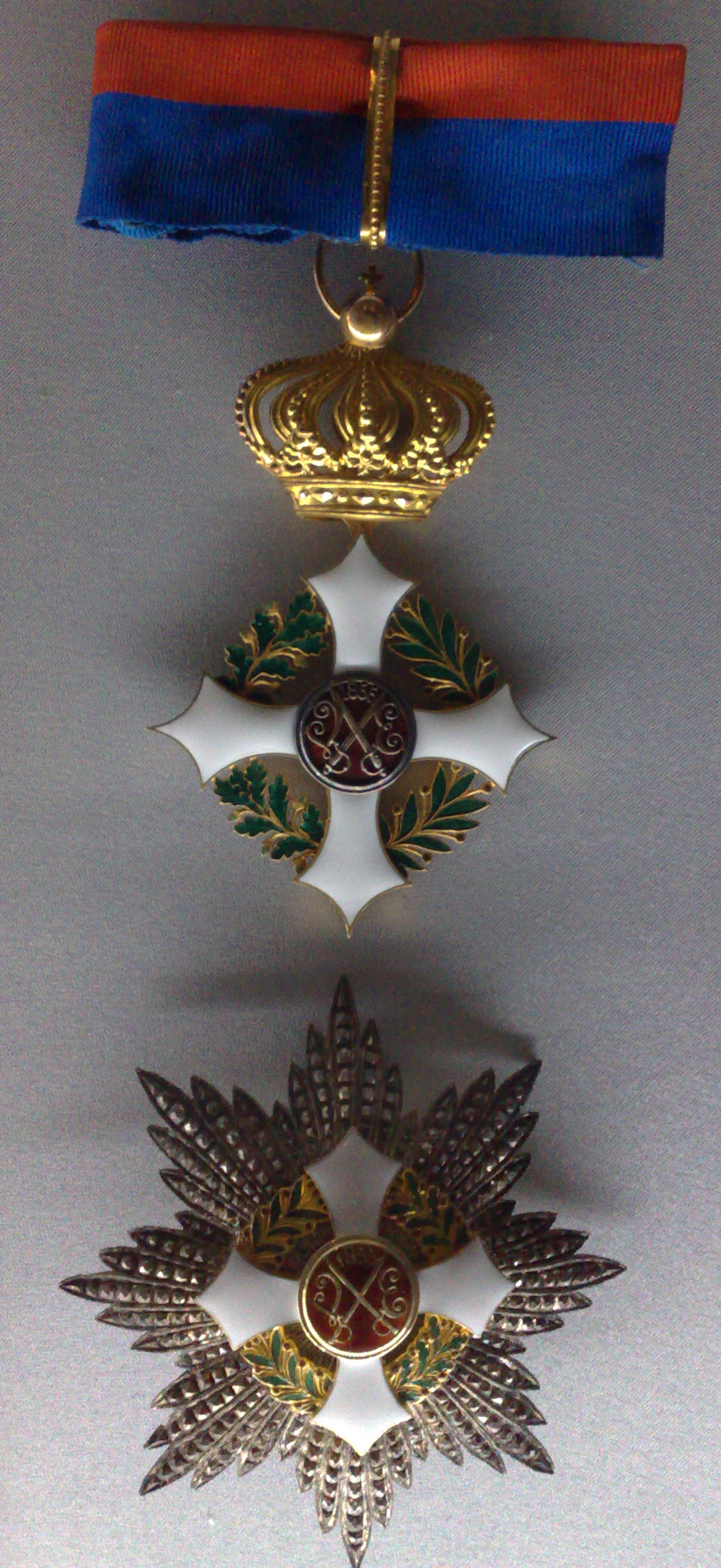
- Insignia of the Knight Grand Cross of the Military Order of Savoy
- Type: Order of knighthood
- Awarded for: Valour
- Presented by: Kingdom of Italy and Kingdom of Sardinia
- Eligibility: Military personnel
- Status: Reconstituted on 2 January 1947
- Established: Turin, 14 August 1815
- First award: Victor Emmanuel I of Sardinia
- Final award: Enrico de Nicola
- Ribbon of the order

Precedence
- Next (higher): Order of Saints Maurice and Lazarus
- Equivalent: Military Order of Italy
- Next (lower): Civil Order of Savoy

The Military Order of Savoy was a military honorary order of the Kingdom of Sardinia first, and of the Kingdom of Italy later. Following the abolition of the Italian monarchy, the order became the Military Order of Italy.

== History ==
The origin of the Military Order of Savoy can be traced back to the Medal of Military Valor granted by Victor Amadeus III of Sardinia to his soldiers.

Between 1789 and 1815 this medal went into disuse because of the Piedmontese and Subalpine Republics and the subsequent Napoleonic regime in Italy in Savoy and Piedmont. On 1 April 1815 the medal was bestowed again by Victor Emmanuel I of Sardinia and on the 14th of August of the same year replaced by the Military Order of Savoy. This military order was to be granted to the soldiers who fought in the army of Napoleon and became part of the Legion of Honor or the Order of the Iron Crown due to military merit. It was also conferred to officers of the Royal Sardinian Army and Navy, who have become Knights of the Order of Saints Maurice and Lazarus for gallantry. The order was conceded to everyone no matter what religion or rank the soldier was. Under Charles Albert of Sardinia, the order fell into disuse in favor of the Order of Saints Maurice and Lazarus and the re-established Medal of Military Valor.

In 1855, during the Crimean War, Victor Emanuel II re-established the Military Order of Savoy to reward all other kind of military merit, from the simple soldier up to the high-ranked officer, that performed a special military feat during battle.

Following the foundation of the Republic, the order was renamed in Military Order of Italy in 1947 and continues to be awarded under that title today.

== Grades ==
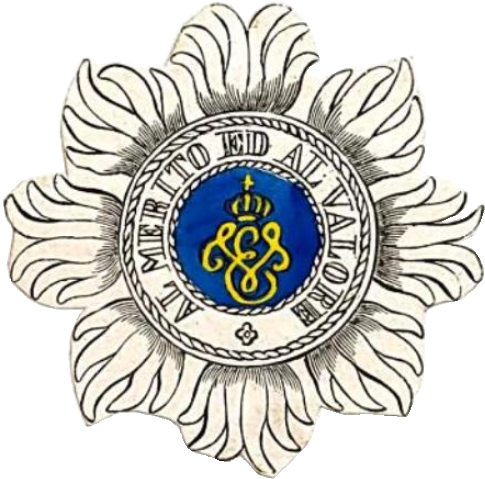
1815 Star of the Knights Grand Cross

The Order was once split into four different grades of merit:

- Knight Grand Cross
- Commander
- Knight
- Private (milite)

The rank of Knights replaced the Gold Medal of Military Valor, the rank of Private the Silver Medal of Military Valor.

In 1855 these four different grades were then modified into five and in 1857 named after the ones of the French Legion of Honour and the Sardinian Order of Saints Maurice and Lazarus:

- Knight Grand Cross
- Grand Officer (Commander 1st class until 1857)
- Commander (Commander 2nd class until 1857)
- Officer
- Private or Knight

For the last degree, use of the term Knight (cavaliere) was more frequent than that of Private (milite), although that term was never officially abolished.

== Insignia ==
=== 1815–1855 ===
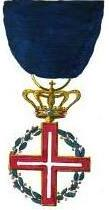
Golden Badge of the Military Order of Savoy

The badge was a silver Greek cross for the Privates, and golden for all the other ranks, with the royal crown of Sardinia of gold and silver, respectively. The cross was covered with white and red enamel, imitating the Savoy coat of arms, and was surrounded with a laurel crown covered with green enamel. The insignia was personally given by the King in presence of the ranked troops in order to give military honours.

The Knights and Privates wore the badge hanging from a blue ribbon pinned in the buttonhole of the uniform. The Commanders wore the medal hanging from a blue ribbon around the neck while the Knights Grand Cross wore it hanging from a blue sash at the height of the left hip together with a silver star embroided to the uniform at the high of the left chest. The center of the star bore the letters VE in a blue field, circled with the motto Al Merito ed al Valore (For Merit and Valour).

=== 1855–1946 ===
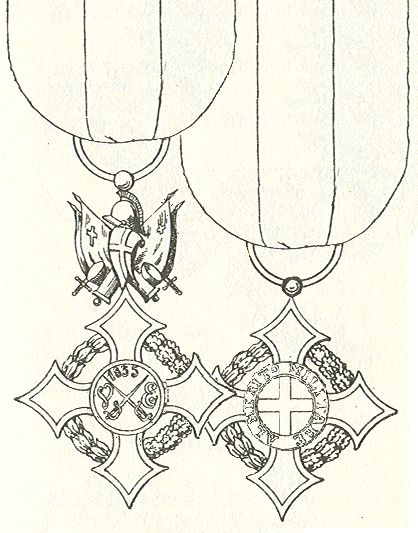
Officer's cross (obverse) and Knight's cross (reverse)

After 1855 the badge was an Arrow Cross surrounded by a laurel and oak wreath. The center bore the year 1855 and the letters VE with two crossed swords, and the Savoy cross and the motto AL MERITO MILITARE on the backside.

Ribbon
| Cavalier | Officer | Commendatore | Grand Officer | Knight Grand Cross |

The badge was worn by Knights Grand Cross and Commanders as before. The Grand Commanders wore it at the neck and were additionally bestowed with a star on the left chest, Officers wore it hanging from a trophy at a ribbon with a rosette at the left chest, the Knights in the same way without the trophy and the rosette.

== See also ==
- Military Order of Italy
- Medal of Military Valor
