= 1st Infantry Division "Superga" =

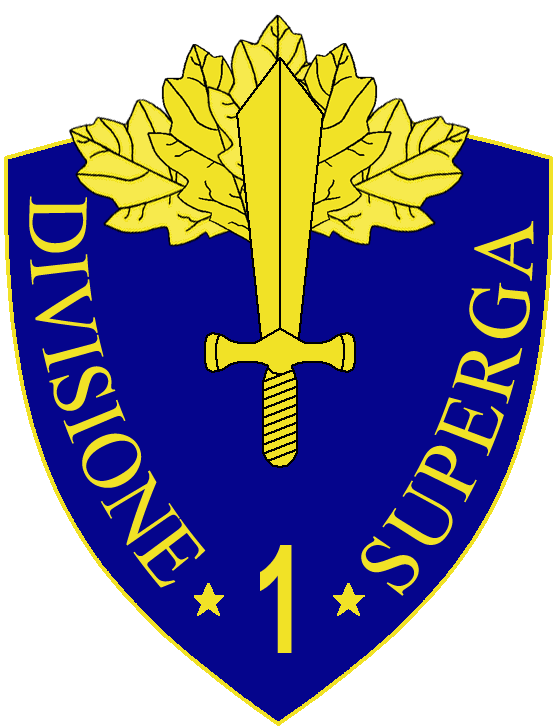
- 1st Infantry Division "Superga" insignia
- Active: 1940 – 1943
- Country: Kingdom of Italy
- Branch: Royal Italian Army
- Type: Infantry
- Size: Division
- Garrison/HQ: Turin
- Engagements: World War II

Commanders
- Notable commanders: Curio Barbasetti di Prun

Insignia
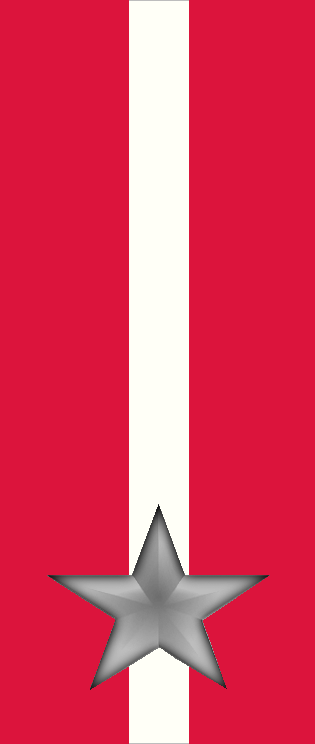
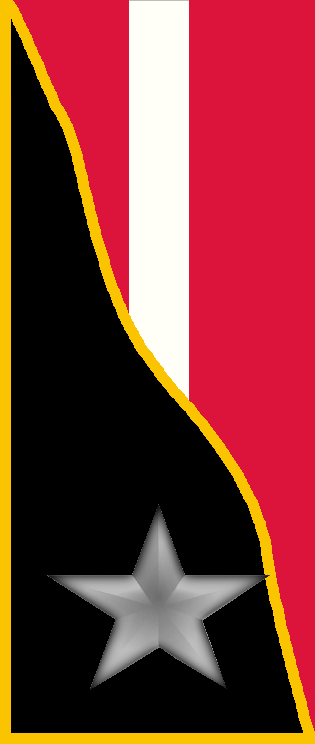
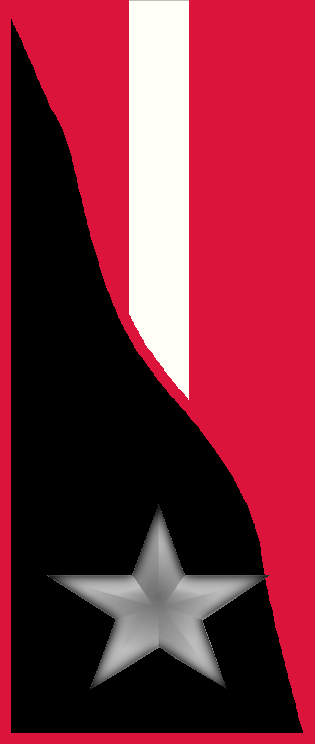
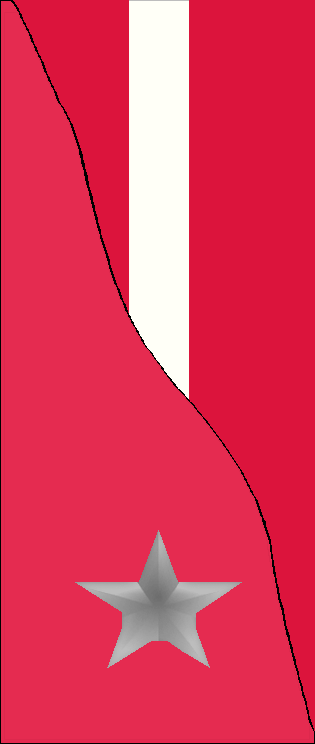
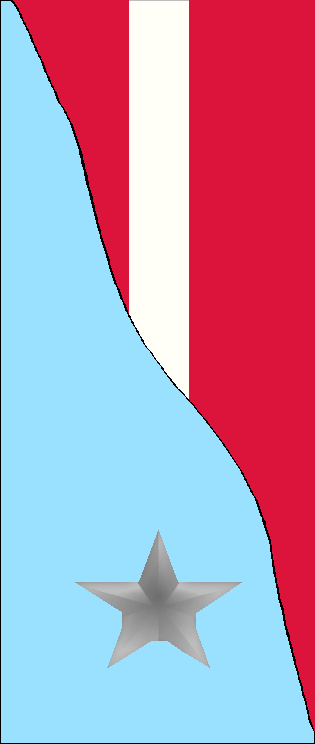
- Identification symbol: Superga Division gorget patches

The 1st Infantry Division "Superga" (Italian: 1ª Divisione di fanteria "Superga") was an infantry division of the Royal Italian Army during World War II. The Superga was a mountain-type infantry division, which meant that the division's artillery and logistics were moved by pack mules, while in standard infantry divisions artillery and logistics were moved by horse-drawn limbers and carriages. Italy's real mountain warfare divisions were the six alpine divisions manned by Alpini troops. The Superga recruited primarily from central Piedmont and was based, together with its two infantry regiments, in Turin, while the 5th Artillery Regiment was based in Venaria Reale. The division was and named for the Superga hill near Turin, where members of Italy's Royal House of Savoy were buried in the Basilica of Superga.

== History ==
The division's lineage begins with the Brigade "Basilicata" established in Naples on 1 November 1884 with the 91st and 92nd infantry regiments.

=== World War I ===
The brigade fought on the Italian front in World War I. In October 1926 the brigade assumed the name of I Infantry Brigade and received the 90th Infantry Regiment "Salerno" from the disbanded Brigade "Salerno". The brigade was the infantry component of the 1st Territorial Division of Turin, which also included the 5th Artillery Regiment. In 1934 the division changed its name to 1st Infantry Division "Superga". On 25 March 1939 the division ceded the 90th Infantry Regiment "Salerno" to the 5th Infantry Division "Cosseria". On 5 April of the same year the I Infantry Brigade was dissolved and the two remaining infantry regiments came under direct command of the division, and the 91st and 92nd infantry regiments and 5th Artillery Regiment changed their names to "Superga".

=== World War II ===
On 10 June 1940 the Superga participated in the invasion of France. The Superga advanced to the French village of Argentière on 21 June 1940, reaching the Battaileres pass and the Argentiere summit on 22 June 1940. On 24 June 1940, just before the armistice, the Division attacked the Ouvrage Pas du Roc fort in the Alpine Line. Supported by its neighboring fort Ouvrage Arrondaz and others, the fort repelled the attack.

In August 1941 the division moved to Naples. On 23 November 1941 the Superga was ordered to reorganize as an auto-transportable division of the North-African type for the planned invasion of Malta scheduled for summer 1942. The reorganization got underway in March 1942, with the division's units based in Formia and Gaeta, while the division's headquarter moved to Avola in Sicily for the planning of the assault on Malta.

In November 1942 the Superga was sent to Tunisia during the Run for Tunis and landed in Bizerte on 11 November 1942. The first to arrive in Tunisia was the commanding officer of the infantry, Brigadier General Arturo Benigni. By 20 November 1942 it was assembling at Enfidaville Airfield. By 1 December 1942 the Superga together with the L Special Brigade had moved to Sousse-Sfax area. From late January 1943 until 4 February 1943 it repelled an Anglo-American assault in the Oued el Koukat depression. The second assault on the positions of the Superga started on 23 February 1943. The Superga surrendered to the French forces on 12 May 1943.

== Organization ==
1st Infantry Division "Superga" organization in 1940

- 1st Infantry Division "Superga", in Turin
  - Headquarters
    - Command Company
    - 1st Carabinieri Section
    - 2nd Carabinieri Section
    - 80th Field Post Office
    - 1st Infantry Division Command Transport Squad
  - 91st Infantry Regiment "Superga", (Note: Named 91st Infantry Regiment "Basilicata" until 1939 when the army reorganized its divisions as binary divisions and divisional infantry regiments took the name of the division.) in Turin
    - Command Company
    - 3 × Fusilier battalions
    - Support Weapons Battery (65/17 mod. 13 infantry support guns)
    - Mortar Company (81mm mod. 35 mortars)
  - 92nd Infantry Regiment "Superga", (Note: Named 92nd Infantry Regiment "Basilicata" until 1939 when the army reorganized its divisions as binary divisions and divisional infantry regiments took the name of the division.) in Turin
    - Command Company
    - 3 × Fusilier battalions
    - Support Weapons Battery (65/17 mod. 13 infantry support guns)
    - Mortar Company (81mm mod. 35 mortars)
  - 5th Artillery Regiment "Superga", in Venaria Reale
    - Command Unit
    - I Group (100/17 mod. 14 howitzers)
    - II Group (75/13 mod. 15 mountain guns; transferred on 21 January 1941 to the 59th Artillery Regiment "Cagliari")
    - II Group (75/27 mod. 11 field guns; transferred on 21 January 1941 from the 59th Artillery Regiment "Cagliari")
    - III Group (75/13 mod. 15 mountain guns)
    - 1 × Anti-aircraft battery (20/65 mod. 35 anti-aircraft guns)
    - Ammunition and Supply Unit
  - 5th Artillery Regiment "Superga" (after being reorganized as a motorized regiment on 31 May 1942)
    - Command Unit
    - I Group (75/18 mod. 35 howitzers)
    - II Group (75/18 mod. 35 howitzers)
    - LXV Group (100/17 mod. 14 howitzers; joined the regiment in January 1943)
    - IV Group (100/17 mod. 14 howitzers; formed in June 1943 and assigned on 1 July to the 156th Artillery Regiment "Vicenza")
    - 1 × Anti-aircraft battery (20/65 mod. 35 anti-aircraft guns)
  - I Mortar Battalion (81mm mod. 35 mortars)
  - I Self-propelled Anti-tank Battalion (Semovente da 47/32 self-propelled guns; assigned for the Tunisian campaign)
  - CI Anti-aircraft Group (formed for the Tunisian campaign)
    - 21st Anti-aircraft Battery (20/65 mod. 35 anti-aircraft guns)
    - 34th Anti-aircraft Battery (20/65 mod. 35 anti-aircraft guns)
    - 301st Anti-aircraft Battery (20/65 mod. 35 anti-aircraft guns; assigned for the Tunisian campaign)
  - CI Mixed Engineer Battalion (formed in 1942)
  - 1st Anti-tank Company (47/32 mod. 35 anti-tank guns)
  - 1st Telegraph and Radio Operators Company (entered the CI Mixed Engineer Battalion in 1942)
  - 14th Engineer Company (entered the CI Mixed Engineer Battalion in 1942)
  - 1st Autocarrette Section (disbanded in 1942)
  - 7th Medical Section
    - 4 × Field hospitals
    - 1 × Surgical unit
  - 21st Supply Section
  - 123rd Transport Section

Attached during the invasion of France in 1940:

- XVIII CC.NN. Battalion

The XVIII CC.NN. Battalion was replaced in summer 1940 by the 2nd CC.NN. Legion, which left the division when the Superga moved to Naples in 1941:

- 2nd CC.NN. Legion "Alpina"
  - Command Company
  - I CC.NN. Battalion
  - II CC.NN. Battalion
  - 2nd CC.NN. Machine Gun Company

Attached during the Tunisian campaign in 1942-43:

- Marine Infantry Regiment "San Marco"
  - Command Company
  - Battalion "Bafile"
  - Battalion "Grado"
- 10th Bersaglieri Regiment
  - Command Company
  - XVI Auto-transported Bersaglieri Battalion
  - XXXIV Auto-transported Bersaglieri Battalion
  - XXXV Auto-transported Bersaglieri Battalion
  - 10th Anti-tank Company (47/32 mod. 35 anti-tank guns)
- Assault Grouping
  - Command Company
  - Formations Group "A" (Arab volunteers)
  - Assault Battalion "T" (Italians living in Tunisia)
- Tunisian Volunteers Regiment (raised in December 1942)
  - Command Company
  - 3 × battalions (I, II, III; reduced to I and XI battalions in March 1943)

== Commanding officers ==
The division's commanding officers were:

- Generale di Divisione Curio Barbasetti di Prun (7 September 1939 - 9 September 1940)
- Generale di Divisione Dante Lorenzelli (10 September 1940 - 22 December 1942)
- Generale di Divisione Ferdinando Gelich (23 December 1942 - 12 May 1943)
