= Military Order of Italy =

Italian order of knighthood

Military Order of Italy Ordine Militare d'Italia
- Republican Breast star of a Military Knight Grand Cross

Awarded by the Italian Republic
- Type: Order of chivalry
- Established: 14 August 1815; 210 years ago
- Country: Italy
- Eligibility: Military personnel
- Criteria: Valour
- Status: Currently constituted
- Grand Master: President of the Republic
- Chancellor: Minister of Defence
- Grades: Knight Grand Cross; Grand Officer; Commander; Officer; Knight
- Post-nominals: OMI
- Website: www.quirinale.it/page/omi

Precedence
- Next (higher): Order of Merit of the Italian Republic
- Next (lower): Order of Merit for Labour

The Military Order of Italy (Italian: Ordine Militare d'Italia) is the highest military order of the Italian Republic and the former Kingdom of Italy. It was founded as the Military Order of Savoy, a national order by the King of Sardinia, Vittorio Emanuele I, Duke of Savoy in 1815. The order is awarded in five degrees for distinguished wartime conduct of units of the armed forces or individual personnel that has "proven expertise, a sense of responsibility and valour."

The order was continued on the unification of Italy in 1861 and was revived, under its new name, following the foundation of the Republic in 1946. It is bestowed by decree of the President of the Italian Republic, head of the order, on the recommendation of the Minister of Defence.

== Grades ==
Recipients of the Ordine militare di Savoia were transferred retaining their existing accoutrements and seniority.

The insignia of a Military Knight of Italy

The various degrees of the order, which may be conferred posthumously, are as follows:

Monarchy	Republic	Class (English)	Full title in Italian
		1st Class / Knight Grand Cross	Cavaliere di Gran Croce dell'Ordine militare d'Italia
		2nd Class / Grand Officer	Grande Ufficiale dell'Ordine militare d'Italia
		3rd Class / Commander	Commendatore dell'Ordine militare d'Italia
		4th Class / Officer	Ufficiale dell'Ordine militare d'Italia
		5th Class / Knight	Cavaliere dell'Ordine militare d'Italia

The lowest of these may also be awarded for peacetime actions.

== Insignia ==
- The badge is a golden matuna cross, enamelled in white, with a wreath of green-enamelled laurel and oak leaves between the arms of the cross. Officers and Knights wear this badge on a ribbon on the left chest. Commanders and Grand Officers wear it on a necklet.
  - The obverse central disc during the monarchy was red enamel with a white enamel cross. The current version is in white enamel with the letters R.I. (for Repubblica Italiana). In both cases the disc is surrounded by a red enamel ring bearing the inscription Al Merito Militare.
  - The reverse central disc is in red enamel with crossed swords. During the monarchy it had the letters V.E. (for Vittorio Emanuele) on the sides of the sword and the year 1855 above it. The current version has no cypher but has the additional year 1947, the date of the promulgation of the Italian constitution, below the swords.
  - The badge for the three higher classes are suspended by a wreath of green-enamelled laurel and oak leaves; the Officer's badge is suspended by a golden trophy of arms instead and the Knight's badge has neither emblems.
- The star is an eight-pointed faceted silver star with the badge (without suspension) at the centre. This is worn by Knights Grand Cross and Grand Officers only.
- The ribbon is blue—red—blue in equal dimensions.
- Knights Grand Cross wear a sash with the badge of the order suspended from it.

== See also ==
- List of Italian orders of knighthood
- Military Order of Savoy
- Civil Order of Savoy
