= 103rd Infantry Division "Piacenza" =

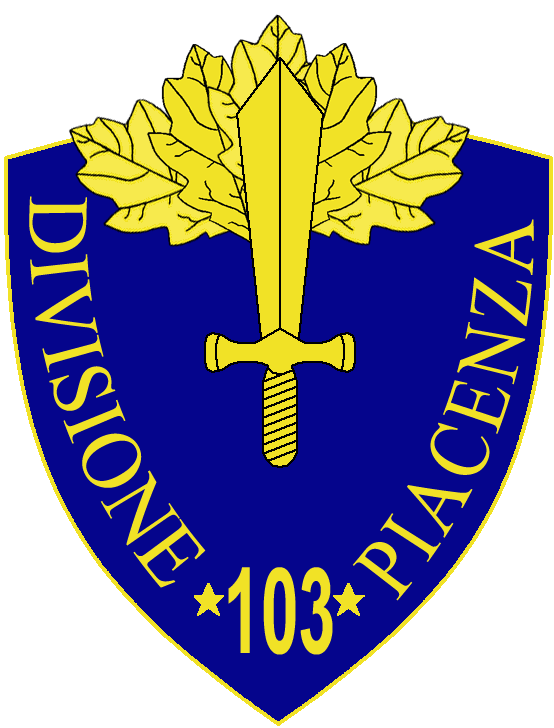
- 103rd Infantry Division "Piacenza" insignia
- Active: 15 March 1942 – September 1943
- Country: Kingdom of Italy
- Branch: Royal Italian Army
- Type: Infantry
- Size: Division
- Engagements: World War II

Insignia
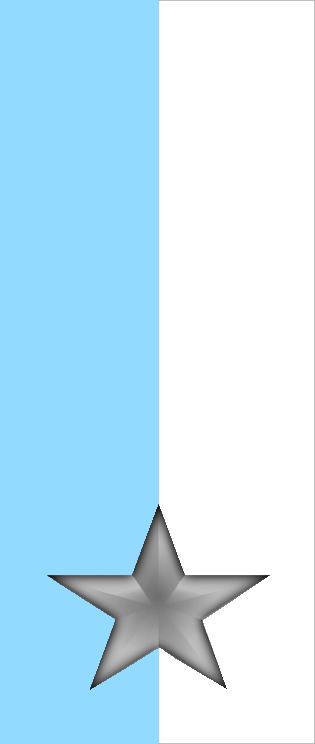
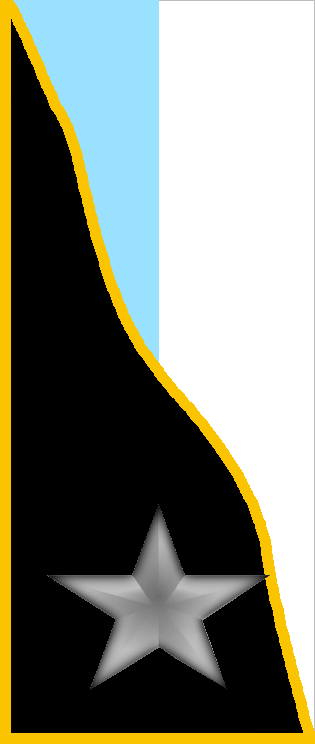
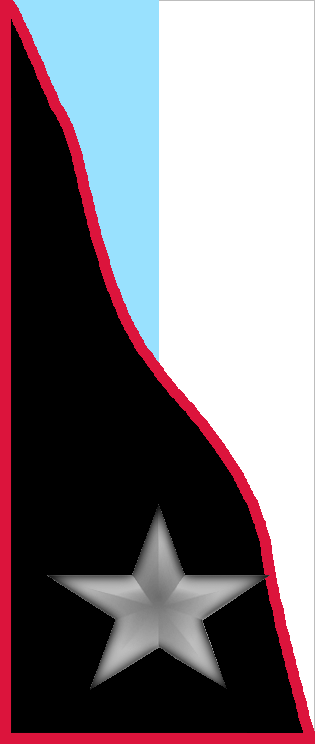
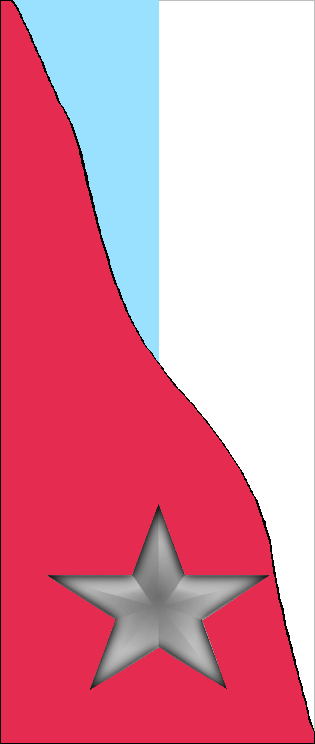
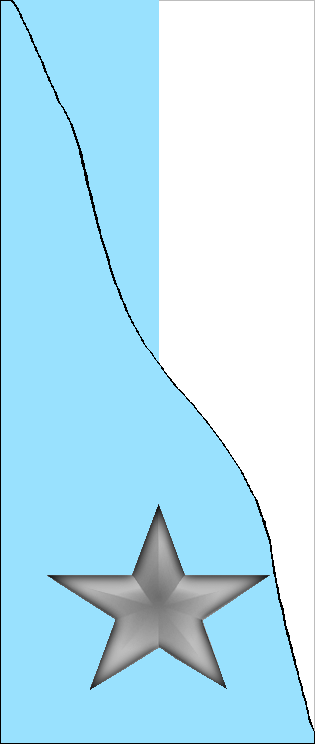
- Identification symbol: Piacenza Division gorget patches

The 103rd Infantry Division "Piacenza" (Italian: 103ª Divisione di fanteria "Piacenza") was an infantry division of the Royal Italian Army during World War II. The Piacenza was named for the city of Piacenza and classified as an auto-transportable division, meaning it had some motorized transport, but not enough to move the entire division at once.

== History ==
=== World War I ===
The division's lineage begins with the Brigade "Piacenza" raised on 15 March 1915 with the 111th and 112th infantry regiments. The brigade fought on the Italian front in World War I and was disbanded after the war in October 1920.

=== World War II ===
The 103rd Infantry Division "Piacenza" was activated in Bolzano on 15 March 1942 and consisted of the 111th and 112th infantry regiments, and the 80th Artillery Regiment. As a division raised during the war the Piacenza did not have its own regimental depots and therefore its regiments were raised by the depots of the 102nd Motorized Division "Trento": the 111th Infantry Regiment "Piacenza" was raised in Trento on 1 January 1942 by the 61st Infantry Regiment "Trento" and the 112th Infantry Regiment "Piacenza" was raised in Trento on 1 January 1942 by the 62nd Infantry Regiment "Trento", while the 108th Motorized Artillery Regiment was raised in Trento by the 46th Artillery Regiment "Trento".

In June 1942 the division exchanged artillery regiments with the 5th Infantry Division "Cosseria", which needed a fully motorized and modern equipped artillery regiment for its deployment to the Soviet Union: the Piacenza ceded the 108th Motorized Artillery Regiment equipped with modern 75/18 Mod. 34 howitzers to the Cosseria and received the 37th Artillery Regiment equipped with World War I vintage 75/27 Mod. 06 field guns in return.

In June 1942 the division moved to Cuneo and Borgo San Dalmazzo in Southern Piedmont and Rivarolo in Liguria. In November 1942 the entire Piacenza moved to Liguria after the XXII Army Corps and its units guarding the Ligurian coast participated in the occupation of Southern France and remained there afterwards as Italian occupation force. In Liguria the Piacenza formed the mobile reserve behind the 201st Coastal Division in the area of Vado Ligure, Savona, Varazze, and Genova.

After the fall of Sicily the division was transferred to Southern Lazio as mobile reserve in the area between the river Garigliano and the city of Ardea. The division's headquarters was at Velletri. After the Armistice of Cassibile was announced on 8 September 1943 the division began to disintegrate and by 12 September its remnants were dissolved by the invading Germans.

== Organization ==
103rd Motorized Division "Piacenza" organization in 1943

- 103rd Infantry Division "Piacenza"
  - Headquarters
    - Command Company
    - 148th Carabinieri Section
    - 149th Carabinieri Section
    - 94th Field Post Office
    - 103rd Infantry Division Command Transport Squad
  - 111th Infantry Regiment "Piacenza"
    - Command Company
    - 3 × Fusilier battalions
    - Support Weapons Battery (65/17 mod. 13 infantry support guns)
    - Mortar Company (81mm mod. 35 mortars)
  - 112th Infantry Regiment "Piacenza"
    - Command Company
    - 3 × Fusilier battalions
    - Support Weapons Battery (65/17 mod. 13 infantry support guns)
    - Mortar Company (81mm mod. 35 mortars)
  - 37th Artillery Regiment "Piacenza", in Albenga (transferred from the 5th Infantry Division "Cosseria" on 5 July 1942)
    - Command Unit
    - I Group (100/17 mod. 14 howitzers; re-equipped with 100/22 mod. 14/19 howitzers and transferred on 7 April 1943 to the 11th Artillery Regiment "Mantova")
    - II Group (75/27 mod. 06 field guns; re-equipped with 75/18 mod. 35 howitzers in late 1942 and renumbered IV Group on 7 April 1943)
    - III Group (75/13 mod. 15 mountain guns; re-equipped with 75/18 mod. 35 howitzers in late 1942; transferred in August 1943 to the 6th Army in Sicily)
    - LXIV Group (100/17 mod. 14 howitzers; renumbered I Group on 7 April 1943)
    - XCI Group (100/17 mod. 14 howitzers; renumbered II Group on 7 April 1943)
    - 1 × Anti-aircraft battery (20/65 mod. 35 anti-aircraft guns; a second battery was added in late 1942)
    - Ammunition and Supply Unit
  - 108th Motorized Artillery Regiment (transferred to the 5th Infantry Division "Cosseria" in April 1942)
    - Command Unit
    - I Group (75/18 mod. 35 howitzers)
    - II Group (75/18 mod. 35 howitzers)
    - III Group (75/18 mod. 35 howitzers)
    - 1 × Anti-aircraft battery (20/65 mod. 35 anti-aircraft guns)
    - Ammunition and Supply Unit
  - CIII Mortar Battalion (81mm mod. 35 mortars; joined the division in October 1942)
  - 303rd Anti-tank Company (47/32 mod. 35 anti-tank guns)
  - 78th Engineer Company
  - 103rd Telegraph and Radio Operators Company
  - 103rd Medical Section
    - 2 × Field hospitals
    - 1 × Surgical unit
  - 103rd Supply Section
  - Transport Section

The following batteries of the Artillery School in Nettunia were attached to the division's artillery regiment in August 1943:

- 1st Battery (75/27 mod. 06 field guns)
- 3rd Battery (75/27 mod. 06 field guns)
- 4th Battery (149/13 heavy howitzers)
- 6th Battery (105/28 cannons)

== Commanding officers ==
The division's commanding officers were:

- Generale di Divisione Carlo Rossi (15 March 1942 - 12 September 1943)
