= 3rd Infantry Division "Ravenna" =

WW2 formation of the Royal Italian Army

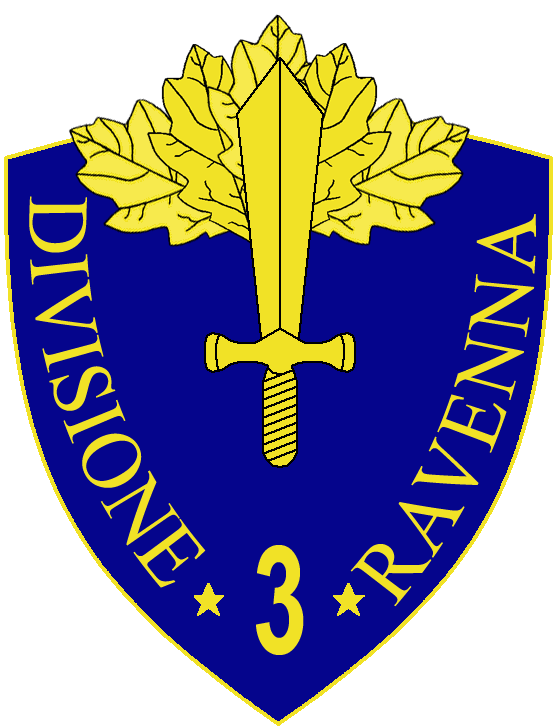
- 3rd Infantry Division "Ravenna" insignia
- Active: 1939–1943
- Country: Kingdom of Italy
- Branch: Royal Italian Army
- Type: Infantry
- Size: Division
- Garrison/HQ: Alessandria
- Engagements: World War II: Italian invasion of France; Invasion of Yugoslavia; Eastern front; Operation Little Saturn

Commanders
- Notable commanders: Edoardo Nebbia

Insignia
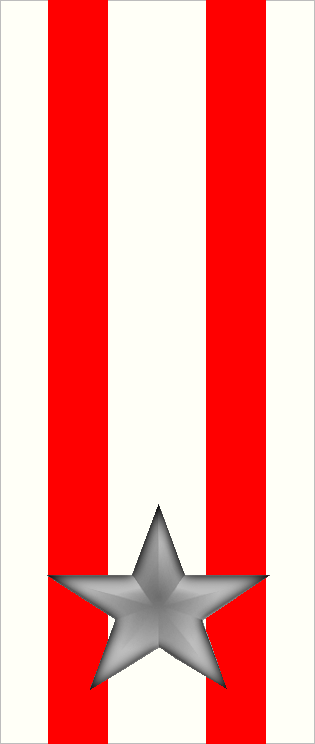
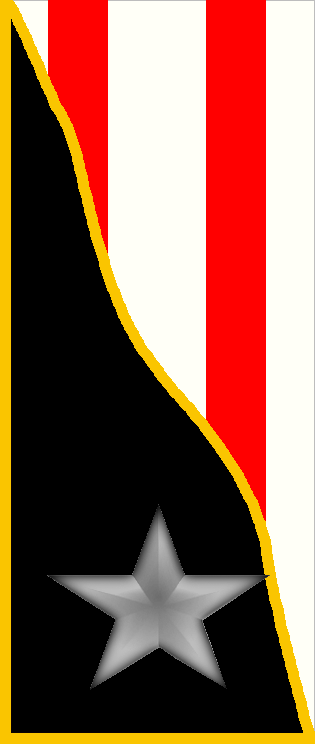
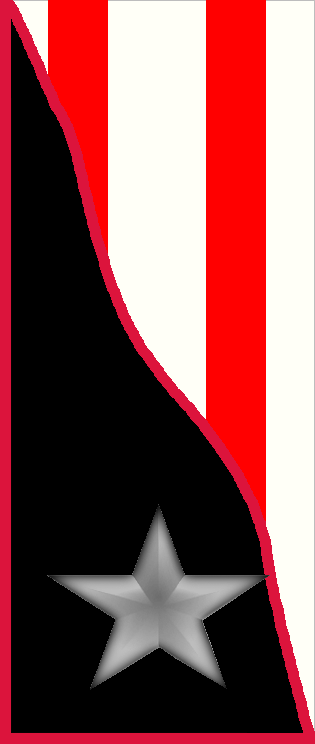
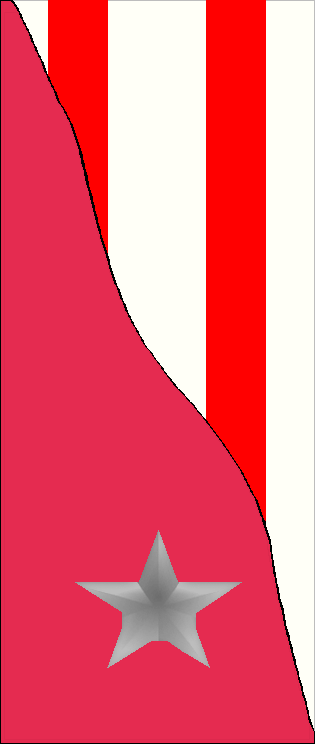
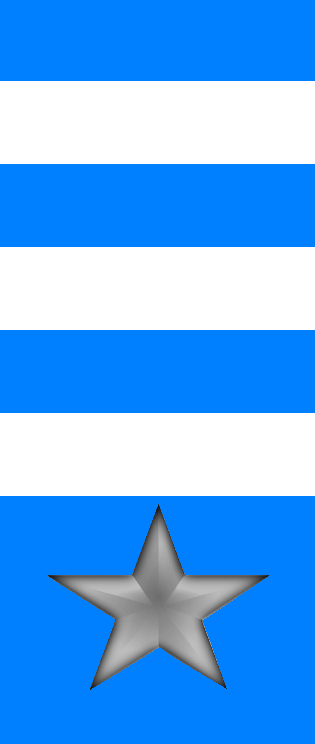
- Identification symbol: Ravenna Division gorget patches

The 3rd Infantry Division "Ravenna" (Italian: 3ª Divisione di fanteria "Ravenna") was an infantry division of the Royal Italian Army during World War II. The Ravenna was a mountain-type infantry division, which meant that the division's artillery and logistics were moved by pack mules, while in standard infantry divisions artillery and logistics were moved by horse-drawn limbers and carriages. Italy's real mountain warfare divisions were the six alpine divisions manned by Alpini troops. The Ravenna was named for the ancient city of Ravenna and based in the city of Alessandria. Its two infantry regiments were based in Alessandria (37th) and Alba (38th), respectively Alessandria and Tortona from 1939, with the division's artillery regiment also based in Alessandria.

== History ==
The division's lineage begins with the XI Brigade established on 24 June 1859 with the 19th and 20th infantry regiments of the Army of the United Provinces of Central Italy. On 16 September 1859 the brigade received the name "Ravenna". On 25 March 1860 the Brigade "Ravenna" entered the Royal Sardinian Army three days after the Kingdom of Sardinia had annexed the United Provinces of Central Italy. Already before entering the Royal Sardinian Army the brigade's two infantry regiments had been renumbered on 30 December 1859 as 37th Infantry Regiment and 38th Infantry Regiment.

=== World War I ===
The brigade fought on the Italian front in World War I. On 13 October 1926 the brigade was disbanded and its two regiments were reassigned: the 37th Infantry Regiment "Ravenna" to the III Infantry Brigade and the 38th Infantry Regiment "Ravenna" to the IV Infantry Brigade. The III Infantry Brigade, the former Brigade "Forlì", also included the 43rd Infantry Regiment "Forlì" and the 44th Infantry Regiment "Forlì". The brigade was the infantry component of the 3rd Territorial Division of Alessandria, which also included the 11th Artillery Regiment.

In 1930 the division exchanged the 44th Infantry Regiment "Forlì" for the 38th Infantry Regiment "Ravenna" with the 4th Territorial Division of Cuneo. In 1935 the division changed its name to 3rd Infantry Division "Monferrato". On 1 April 1934 the division exchanged the 38th Infantry Regiment "Ravenna" for 30th Infantry Regiment "Pisa" with the 26th Infantry Division "Assietta". On 25 March 1939 the 38th Infantry Regiment "Ravenna" returned to the division and the 30th Infantry Regiment "Pisa" was transferred back to the Assietta division. On 31 March 1939 the 43rd Infantry Regiment "Forlì" was transferred to the newly activated 36th Infantry Division "Forlì" and on the same date the III Infantry Brigade was dissolved and the two remaining infantry regiments came under direct command of the division, which changed its name to 3rd Infantry Division "Ravenna".

=== World War II ===
During the Italian invasion of France in June 1940 the Ravenna was part of III Army Corps of 1st Army. At the campaigns conclusions on 24 June 1940 it had reached the village of Fontan.

In preparation for the Invasion of Yugoslavia the Ravenna was assigned to XI Army Corps and transferred to the Italian-Yugoslav border near Kobarid and Most na Soči in early April 1941. After the Yugoslav surrender the division performed mop-up operations in Škofja Loka from 14 April 1941 until 17 April 1941, before handing the city over to German forces. Next mop-up operations were undertaken near Mirna village. In early May 1941 the Ravenna was transferred to Pivka and then returned to Alessandria, where it remained until 1942.

==== Eastern Front ====
The division was one of ten Italian divisions, which served on the Eastern Front as part of the Italian Army in Russia. The Ravenna division received orders to move from Piedmont to Eastern Ukraine in June 1942. Before leaving Italy the Ravenna exchanged artillery regiments with the 104th Infantry Division "Mantova", as the Mantova's 121st Motorized Artillery Regiment was equipped with modern 75/18 Mod. 34 howitzers, which were considered to be of better use in the Soviet Union than the World War I vintage 75/27 Mod. 11 field guns of the Ravenna's 11th Artillery Regiment "Ravenna". The Ravenna arrived in Stalino (today Donetsk) in Eastern Ukraine in July 1942 and was assigned to the Italian XXXV Army Corps. They moved from Stalino to Voroshilovgrad (today Luhansk) on 25 July and then proceeded to the Don river, where the division took up defensive positions between Verhny Mamon and Boguchar. In this sector the Ravenna defeated series of Soviet assault between 20 August and 1 September 1942. On 11 September the Soviet forces renewed their attacks focusing on Solonets, south of Voronezh. Afterwards the front calmed until by mid-November 1942, German intelligence spotted the massing of the Soviet 5th Tank Army across the Don. A German officer attached to the 5th Infantry Division "Cosseria" wrote, that the morale of the division and the neighbouring Ravenna was confident considering all the difficulties.

==== Operation Little Saturn ====
On 11 December 1942 Soviet forces began Operation Little Saturn. The Ravenna division was attacked from either end of the 'pocket' below the Don river held by the Soviets since their August offensive. The division's commander, Major general Francesco Du Pont, asked for a diversionary attack by the nearest Alpini division. General Italo Gariboldi, Commander of the 8th Army, refused because he thought the enemy facing it was too strong and there was too little time. Nor did he deploy the German 27th Panzer Division, which was under his command. The Ravenna destroyed 70 of the 200 Soviet tanks that attacked it, and Du Pont was awarded an Iron Cross First Class in the field by the Germans.

In the following days, however, the intense enemy pressure led to some units of the Ravenna near Verhny Mamon to fall back, thus opening a gap in the Axis' frontline.

By 17 December 1942 Soviet forces reached Chertkovo in the rear of Axis forces. The Soviet 1st Guards Army and the 3rd Guards Army attacked from the north, attempting to encircle 130,000 soldiers of the Italian Army in Russia and advancing to Millerovo.

On 17 December the bulk of the Ravenna had retreated to Voroshilovgrad, where the division reorganized itself and then returned to the front defending the bridges over the Donets river at Veselaya Gora-Stanytsia Luhanska 22–30 December. During the retreat elements of the Ravenna had been separated from the division and been surrounded on 23 December 1942 at Chertkovo, where they, together with other German and Italian units, resisted repeated Soviet attacks. From 1–6 January 1943 the Ravenna was subordinated the German Armeegruppe Fretter-Pico and was defending the western bank of the Donets river. On 15 January the Ravenna tried and succeed to break open the encirclement at Chertkovo.

After Soviet forces had pierced the Donets front on 24 January the Ravenna was forced to retreat under pressure from Soviet armored spearheads. On 17 January the division's remnants reached Bilovodsk and were taken out of the frontline. In April 1943 the remnants of the division were transferred back to Italy, where the division was being reformed in Tuscany. After the announcement of the Armistice of Cassibile on 8 September 1943 the division was disbanded by the invading German forces.

== Organization ==
3rd Infantry Division "Ravenna" organization in 1940

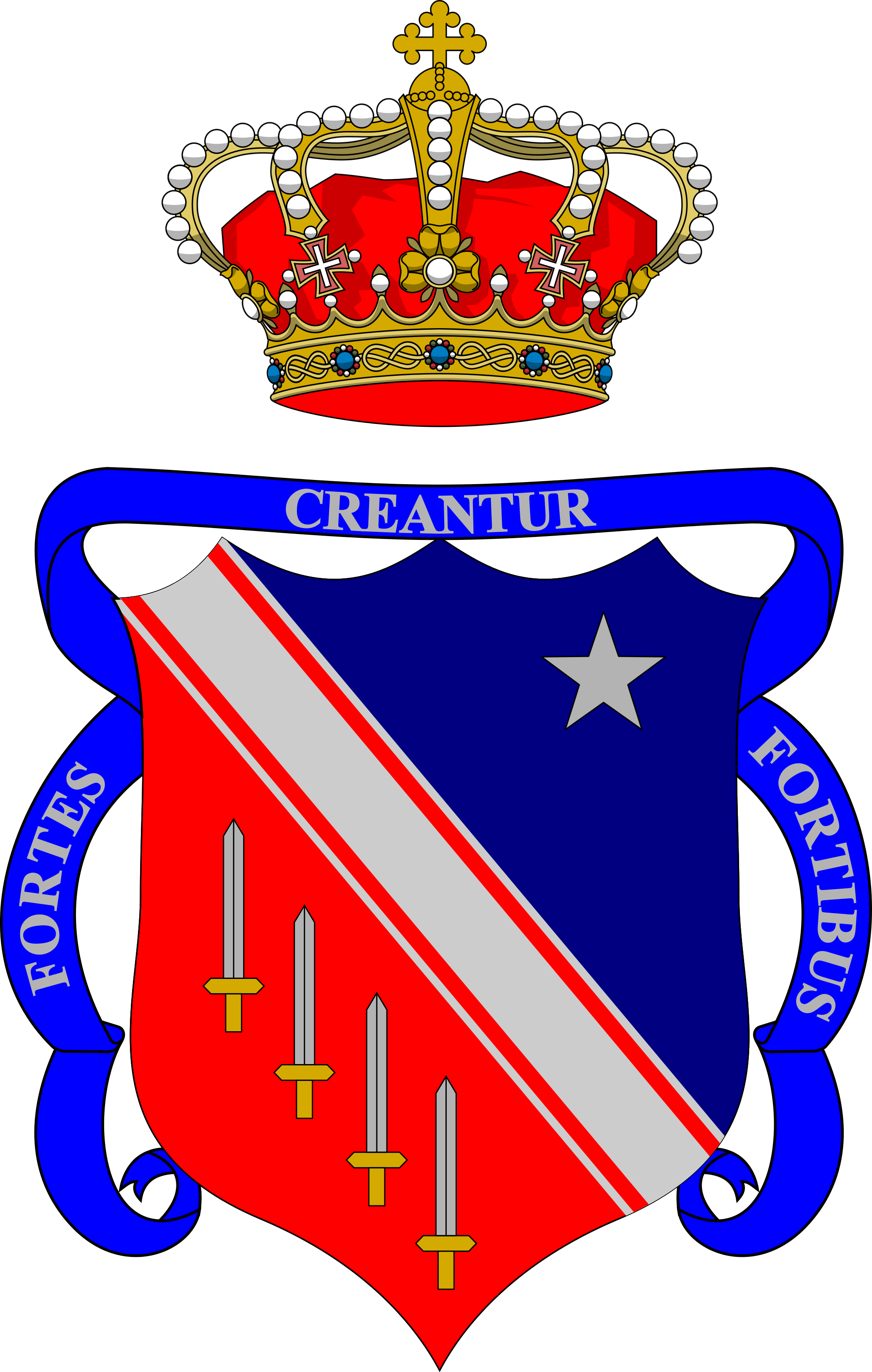
Coat of Arms of the 38th Infantry Regiment "Ravenna", 1939

When the division was deployed to the Soviet Union it consisted of the following units:

- 3rd Infantry Division "Ravenna", in Alessandria
  - Headquarters
    - Command Company
    - 7th Carabinieri Section
    - 8th Carabinieri Section
    - 53rd Field Post Office
    - 3rd Infantry Division Command Transport Squad
  - 37th Infantry Regiment "Ravenna", in Alessandria
    - Command Company
    - 3 × Fusilier battalions
    - Support Weapons Battery (65/17 mod. 13 infantry support guns)
    - Mortar Company (81mm mod. 35 mortars)
  - 38th Infantry Regiment "Ravenna", in Tortona (in Alba 1923–1939)
    - Command Company
    - 3 × Fusilier battalions
    - Support Weapons Battery (65/17 mod. 13 infantry support guns)
    - Mortar Company (81mm mod. 35 mortars)
  - 11th Artillery Regiment "Ravenna", in Alessandria (transferred to the 104th Infantry Division "Mantova" in June 1942)
    - Command Unit
    - I Group (100/17 mod. 14 howitzers; re-equipped with 100/22 mod. 14/19 howitzers in early 1943)
    - II Group (75/13 mod. 15 mountain guns)
    - III Group (75/13 mod. 15 mountain guns; transferred in September 1940 to the 49th Artillery Regiment "Parma" in exchange for a group with 75/27 mod. 06 field guns)
    - 1 × Anti-aircraft battery (20/65 mod. 35 anti-aircraft guns)
    - Ammunition and Supply Unit
  - 121st Motorized Artillery Regiment (transferred from the 104th Infantry Division "Mantova" in June 1942)
    - Command Unit
    - I Group (75/18 mod. 35 howitzers)
    - II Group (75/18 mod. 35 howitzers)
    - XXVIII Group (105/28 cannons)
    - 71st Anti-tank Battery (75/39 anti-tank guns; attached during the deployment in the Soviet Union)
    - 51st Anti-aircraft Battery (20/65 mod. 35 anti-aircraft guns; attached to the regiment in the Soviet Union)
    - 303rd Anti-aircraft Battery (20/65 mod. 35 anti-aircraft guns)
    - Ammunition and Supply Unit
  - III Mortar Battalion (81mm mod. 35 mortars)
  - 3rd Anti-tank Company (47/32 mod. 35 anti-tank guns)
  - 154th Anti-tank Company (47/32 mod. 35 anti-tank guns; transferred from the 154th Infantry Division "Murge" for the deployment in the Soviet Union)
  - 3rd Telegraph and Radio Operators Company
  - 18th Engineer Company
  - 18th Medical Section
    - 16th Field Hospital
    - 201st Field Hospital
    - 202nd Field Hospital
    - 438th Field Hospital
    - 37th Surgical Unit
  - 3rd Autocarrette Section
  - 7th Supply Section (expanded to 7th Supply Unit for the deployment to the Soviet Union)
  - 128th Transport Section
  - 247th Transport Section (attached for the deployment in the Soviet Union)

Attached during the invasion of France in 1940:

- Alpini Battalion "Ceva", from the 1st Alpini Regiment, 4th Alpine Division "Cuneense"
- V CC.NN. Battalion

Attached from late 1940 to April 1942:

- 5th CC.NN. Legion "Valle Scrivia"
  - Command Company
  - V CC.NN. Battalion
  - XXXIV CC.NN. Battalion
  - 5th CC.NN. Machine Gun Company

== Military honors ==
For their conduct during the campaign in the Soviet Union the President of Italy awarded on 31 December 1947 to the two infantry regiments of the 3rd Infantry Division "Ravenna" Italy's highest military honor, the Gold Medal of Military Valor.

- 37th Infantry Regiment "Ravenna" on 31 December 1947
- 38th Infantry Regiment "Ravenna" on 31 December 1947

== Commanding officers ==
The division's commanding officers were:

- Generale di Divisione Matteo Roux (1939 - 15 August 1939)
- Generale di Divisione Edoardo Nebbia (16 August 1939 - 3 October 1942)
- Generale di Divisione Francesco Du Pont (4 October 1942 - 8 September 1943)
