= 108th Artillery Regiment "Cosseria" =

Inactive Italian Army artillery unit

- 108° Reggimento Artiglieria "Cosseria"
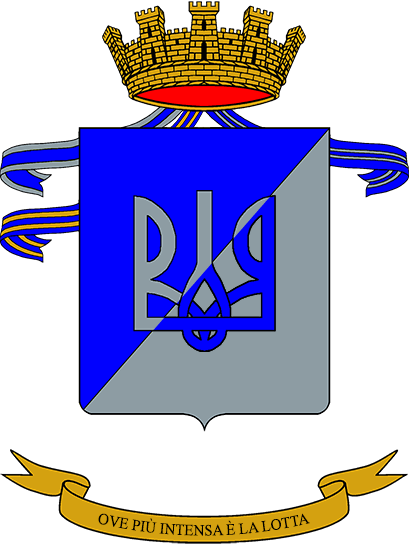
- Regimental coat of arms
- Active: 1 Sept. 1941 — 8 Sept. 1943; 1 Jan. 1976 — 31 Oct. 1986
- Country: Italy
- Branch: Italian Army
- Type: Artillery
- Role: Field artillery
- Part of: Armored Division "Ariete"
- Garrison/HQ: Casarsa della Delizia
- Motto(s): "Ove più intensa è la lotta"
- Anniversaries: 15 June 1918 - Second Battle of the Piave River
- Decorations: 1x Silver Medal of Military Valor; 1x War Cross of Military Valor; 1x Bronze Medal of Army Valor

Insignia
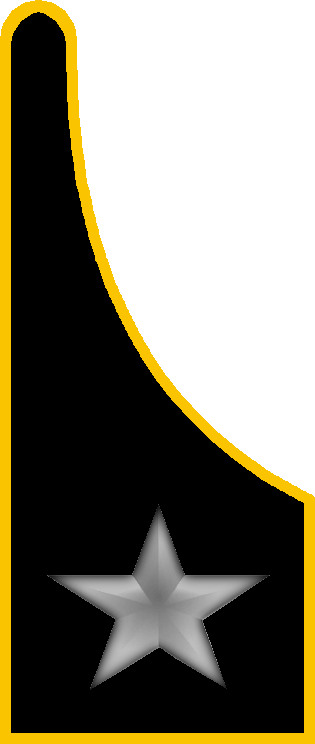
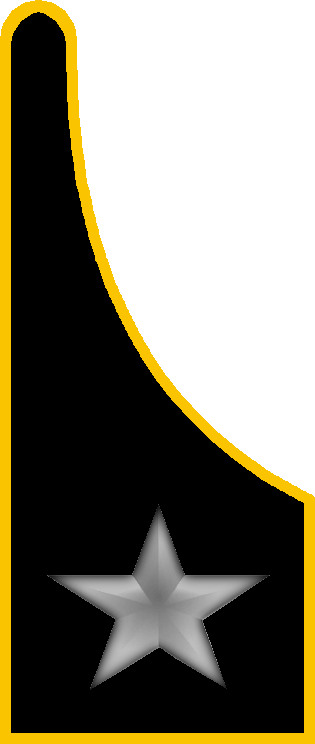
- Regimental gorget patches

The 108th Artillery Regiment "Cosseria" (Italian: 108° Reggimento Artiglieria "Cosseria") is an inactive field artillery regiment of the Italian Army, which was based in Casarsa della Delizia in Friuli-Venezia Giulia. Originally an artillery regiment of the Royal Italian Army, the regiment was assigned in World War II to the 5th Infantry Division "Cosseria", with which the regiment was deployed to the Eastern Front, where division and regiment were destroyed during Operation Little Saturn. The unit was reformed in 1976 and disbanded 10 years later. The regimental anniversary falls, as for all Italian Army artillery regiments, on June 15, the beginning of the Second Battle of the Piave River in 1918.

== History ==
=== World War II ===
On 1 September 1941 the depot of the 8th Artillery Regiment "Pasubio" in Verona formed the 108th Motorized Artillery Regiment. The regiment consisted of a command, a command unit, and three group with 75/18 mod. 35 howitzers. In April 1942 the regiment was assigned to the 5th Infantry Division "Cosseria", which also included the 89th Infantry Regiment "Cosseria" and 90th Infantry Regiment "Cosseria". Upon entering the division the regiment was renamed 108th Artillery Regiment "Cosseria" and reorganized. The regiment now consisted of a command, a command unit, I and II groups with 75/18 mod. 35 howitzers, the IV Group with 105/28 cannons, and the 87th and 305th anti-aircraft batteries with 20/65 mod. 35 anti-aircraft guns. The regiment's III Group was transferred to the 17th Artillery Regiment "Sforzesca".

The division was assigned to the Italian 8th Army, which was sent to the Eastern Front. After the arriving in the Soviet Union the regiment also received the 72nd Anti-tank Battery with 75/39 anti-tank guns. On 16 December 1942 the Red Army commenced Operation Little Saturn, which destroyed most of the Italian 8th Army. The remnants of the Cosseria division were repatriated in April 1943.

The regiment was rebuilt by the depot of the 8th Artillery Regiment "Pasubio" in Verona. It now consisted of a command, a command unit, the I Group with 100/22 mod. 14/19 howitzers, the II Group with 75/27 mod. 06 field guns, and the DXXII Trucked Anti-aircraft Group with 90/53 anti-aircraft guns.

For its conduct in the Soviet Union the regiment was awarded a Silver Medal of Military Valor and a War Cross of Military Valor, which were both affixed to the regiment's flag and are depicted on the regiment's coat of arms. The regiment was still in the process of being rebuilt when it was disbanded by invading German forces after the announcement of the Armistice of Cassibile on 8 September 1943.

=== Cold War ===
During the 1975 army reform the army disbanded the regimental level and newly independent battalions and groups were granted for the first time their own flags. On 31 December 1975 the 132nd Armored Artillery Regiment of the Armored Division "Ariete" was disbanded and the next day the regiment's V Heavy Self-propelled Artillery Group in Casarsa della Delizia was reorganized and renamed 108th Heavy Self-propelled Field Artillery Group "Cosseria". The group was assigned to the Artillery Command of the Armored Brigade "Ariete" and consisted of a command, a command and services battery, and three batteries with M109G 155 mm self-propelled howitzers.

On 12 November 1976 the group was assigned the flag and traditions of the 108th Artillery Regiment "Cosseria" by decree 846 of the President of the Italian Republic Giovanni Leone. At the time the group fielded 477 men (38 officers, 62 non-commissioned officers, and 377 soldiers).

For its conduct and work after the 1976 Friuli earthquake the group was awarded a Bronze Medal of Army Valor, which was affixed to the group's flag and added to the group's coat of arms. On 7 July 1981 the group was equipped with modern towed FH70 155 mm howitzers and changed its name to 108th Heavy Field Artillery Group "Cosseria".

In 1986 the Italian Army abolished the divisional level and so on 31 October 1986 the Armored Division "Ariete" was disbanded. On the same date the 108th Heavy Field Artillery Group "Cosseria" was disbanded and on 6 November the flag of the 108th Artillery Regiment "Cosseria" was returned to the Shrine of the Flags in the Vittoriano in Rome.
