= 41st Infantry Regiment "Modena" =

Inactive Italian Army infantry unit

- 41° Reggimento Fanteria "Modena"
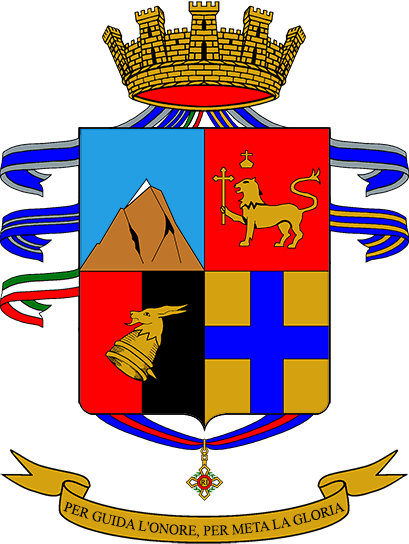
- Regimental coat of arms
- Active: 7 May 1859 – 21 Sept. 1943; 20 Oct. 1975 – 30 Sept. 1995
- Country: Italy
- Branch: Italian Army
- Part of: Mechanized Brigade "Gorizia"
- Garrison/HQ: Gradisca d'Isonzo
- Mottos: "Per guida l'onore, per meta la gloria"
- Anniversaries: 27 October 1918 – Battle of Monte Pertica
- Decorations: 2× Military Order of Italy; 2× Silver Medals of Military Valor; 1× War Cross of Military Valor; 1× Bronze Medal of Army Valor; 1× Silver Medal of Civil Valor

Insignia
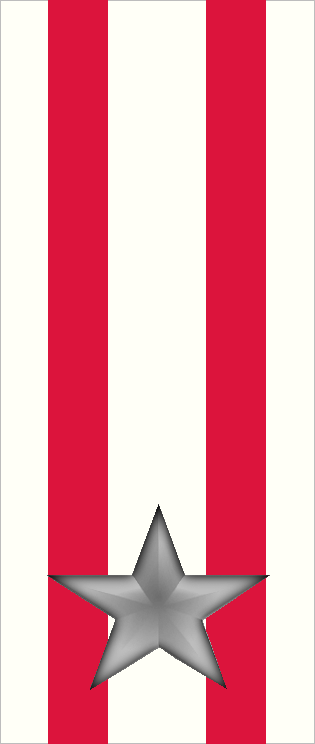
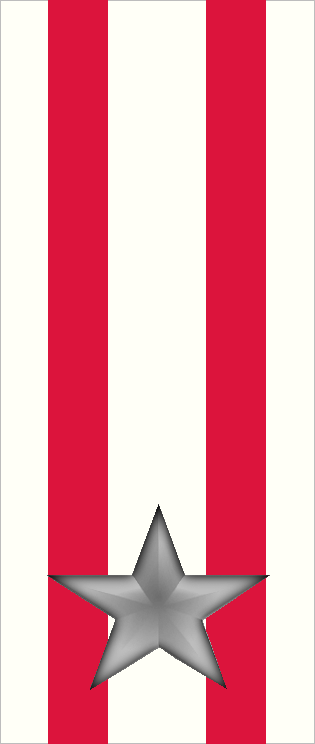
- Regimental gorget patches

The 41st Infantry Regiment "Modena" (Italian: 41° Reggimento Fanteria "Modena") is an inactive unit of the Italian Army last based in Gradisca d'Isonzo. The regiment is named for the city of Modena and part of the Italian Army's infantry arm. On 7 May 1859, a volunteer unit was formed in Sarzana, which on 16 June was split into two regiments. The two regiment were assigned to the newly formed Brigade "Modena". On 1 January 1860, the two regiments were renumbered 41st Infantry Regiment and 42nd Infantry Regiment, and on 25 March 1860, the regiments joined the Royal Sardinian Army.

In 1866, the 41st Infantry Regiment participated in the Third Italian War of Independence and in 1870 in the capture of Rome. In World War I the regiment fought on the Italian front. In 1935–36 the regiment fought in the Second Italo-Ethiopian War. During World War II, the regiment was assigned to the 37th Infantry Division "Modena", with which it fought in the invasion of France and Greco-Italian War. After the announcement of the Armistice of Cassibile on 8 September 1943 the division and its regiments were disbanded by invading German forces.

In 1975, the regiment's flag and traditions were assigned to the 41st Mechanized Infantry Battalion "Modena", which was assigned to the Mechanized Brigade "Gorizia". In 1992, the battalion lost its autonomy and entered the reformed 41st Infantry Regiment "Modena". In 1995, the regiment was disbanded and the flag of the 41st Infantry Regiment "Modena" transferred to the Shrine of the Flags in the Vittoriano in Rome. The regiment's anniversary falls on 27 October 1918, the day the regiment conquered Monte Pertica during the Battle of Vittorio Veneto, for which the regiment was awarded a Silver Medal of Military Valor.

== History ==
=== Formation ===
On 21 July 1858, French Emperor Napoleon III and the Prime Minister of Sardinia Camillo Benso, Count of Cavour met in Plombières and reached a secret verbal agreement on a military alliance between the Second French Empire and the Kingdom of Sardinia against the Austrian Empire. On 26 January 1859, Napoleon III signed the Franco-Sardinian Treaty, followed by King Victor Emmanuel II on 29 January 1859. On 9 March 1859, Sardinia mobilized its army, followed by Austria on 9 April. On 23 April, Austria delivered an ultimatum to Sardinia demanding its demobilization. Upon Sardinia's refusal, Austria declared war on 26 April and three days later the Austrians crossed the Ticino river into Piedmont. Consequently, France honored its alliance with Sardinia and declared war on Austria on 3 May 1859.

On 7 May 1859, the Royal Sardinian Army formed the Hunters of the Magra Corps (Italian: Corpo Cacciatori della Magra), with volunteers that had come from Central Italy. The corps was formed in the city of Sarzana, which was located next to the borders of the Kingdom of Sardinia with the Grand Duchy of Tuscany, the Duchy of Modena and Reggio, and the Duchy of Parma and Piacenza. The corps was named for the Magra river, which flows past Sarzana. On 16 June 1859, the corps' battalions were assigned to the newly formed 1st Regiment Cacciatori della Magra respectively 2nd Regiment Cacciatori della Magra. The two regiments participated in the Second Italian War of Independence, which ended on 12 July 1859 with the Armistice of Villafranca. The Armistice called for the rulers of the Grand Duchy of Tuscany, the Duchy of Modena and Reggio, and the Duchy of Parma and Piacenza, which all had fled their nations, to be restored to their thrones. However neither Sardinia nor the Sardinian installed governments in the three nations wished for a return of the rulers.

On 1 August 1859, the Hunters of the Magra Corps, which at the time occupied the city of Parma, was renamed Brigade "Modena" and the two regiments were redesignated 1st Infantry Regiment and 2nd Infantry Regiment. On 30 November 1859, the Duchy of Parma and Piacenza, Duchy of Modena and Reggio, and the Papal Legations of the Romagne were united under the Royal Government of Emilia, which on 1 January 1860 was redesignated as the Royal Provinces of Emilia. On the same date, the 1st and 2nd infantry regiments took their place in the progressive numerical order of the regiments of the Royal Sardinian Army and became the 41st Infantry Regiment (Brigade "Modena") and 42nd Infantry Regiment (Brigade "Modena"). On 11 and 12 March 1860, the Royal Provinces of Emilia voted in a plebiscite for annexation by the Kingdom of Sardinia. On 18 March 1860, the annexation act was presented to Victor Emmanuel II and one week later, on 25 March 1860, the Brigade "Modena" and its two regiments were formally incorporated into the Royal Sardinian Army.

=== Third Italian War of Independence ===
On 1 August 1862, the 41st Infantry Regiment (Brigade "Modena") ceded one of its depot companies to help form the 63rd Infantry Regiment (Brigade "Cagliari"). On the same day the regiment ceded its 17th Company and 18th Company to help form the 65th Infantry Regiment (Brigade "Valtellina"). In 1866, the Brigade "Modena" participated in the Third Italian War of Independence. In September 1870, the brigade participated in the capture of Rome. On 25 October 1871, the brigade level was abolished, and the two regiments of the Brigade "Modena" were renamed 41st Infantry Regiment "Modena", respectively 42nd Infantry Regiment "Modena". On 2 January 1881, the brigade level was reintroduced, and the two regiments were renamed again as 41st Infantry Regiment (Brigade "Modena") and 42nd Infantry Regiment (Brigade "Modena").

On 1 November 1884, the 41st Infantry Regiment ceded some of its companies to help form the 91st Infantry Regiment (Brigade "Basilicata"). In 1887–88 the regiment's 9th Company deployed to Massawa for the Italo-Ethiopian War of 1887–1889. Although most of the 9th Company was wiped out in the Battle of Dogali on 26 January 1887, the war led to the establishment of the Italian colony of Eritrea. In 1895–96, the regiment provided six officers and 240 enlisted for units deployed to Italian Eritrea for the First Italo-Ethiopian War. On 16 January 1900, a series of explosions occurred at the dynamite factory in Avigliana and the regiment's 1st Company was dispatched to help contain the fire. For its service and courage the 1st Company was awarded Silver Medal of Civil Valor, which was affixed to the regiment's flag and added to the regiment's coat of arms. In 1900–01 the regiment's 10th Company, along with companies of the 8th Infantry Regiment "Cuneo", 43rd Infantry Regiment "Forlì", and 69th Infantry Regiment "Ancona", was assigned to a provisional battalion, which served with the Eight-Nation Alliance in China during the Boxer Rebellion. In 1911–12, the regiment provided 15 officers and 1,324 enlisted to augment units deployed to Libya for the Italo-Turkish War.

=== World War I ===
At the outbreak of World War I, the Brigade "Modena" formed, together with the Brigade "Salerno" and the 28th Field Artillery Regiment, the 8th Division. At the time the 41st Infantry Regiment consisted of three battalions, each of which fielded four fusilier companies and one machine gun section. On 1 March 1915, the depot of the 41st Infantry Regiment in Savona formed a battalion, which was assigned on the same day to the newly formed 158th Infantry Regiment (Brigade "Liguria"). After Italy's entry into the war on 23 May 1915, the Brigade "Modena" was deployed in the Tolmin sector, where it attacked the Austro-Hungarian Army positions on the summit ridge of Mrzli Vrh. This first attack cost the brigade 1,055 casualties. From 21 to 25 July 1915, during the Second Battle of the Isonzo, the 41st Infantry Regiment's I Battalion supported an attack by Alpini troops against Austro-Hungarian positions on the summit of the Batognica. On 14 August 1915, the regiment, together with the regiments of the Brigade "Salerno" launched another attack against the summit ridge of Mrzli Vrh, which was unsuccessful and cost the regiment 689 casualties.

In May 1916, the brigade was sent to the Asiago plateau, where the Italian lines were crumbling under intense Austro-Hungarian attacks during the Battle of Asiago. On 2 June 1916, the Brigade "Modena" entered the frontline in the Monte Cengio sector and deployed along the summit ridge of Monte Paù. On 16 June, the 41st Infantry Regiment was sent to hold the line on Monte Zovetto, while the 42nd Infantry Regiment held the line at Magnaboschi. On 25 June, the Austro-Hungarian forces ended their offensive and fell back to the Northern side of the Asiago plateau. The defensive battle had cost the brigade more than 2,000 casualties. On 12 August 1916, the brigade was sent to the Karst plateau on the lower Isonzo river. On 9 October 1916, the Eighth Battle of the Isonzo commenced and the brigade attack the Austro-Hungarian positions to the East of the Lago di Doberdò. Within three days the brigade achieved its objects at the cost of 1,885 casualties. On 13 October 1916, the brigade was taken out of the first line and sent to the Giudicarie, where the brigade was assigned the calm front sector in the Val Chiese.

On 22 January 1917, the depot of the 41st Infantry Regiment in Savona formed the command of the Brigade "Lario", and three days later, on 25 January 1917, the depot formed the 234th Infantry Regiment for the new brigade. In August 1917, the brigade was sent to Vrtojba on the lower Isonzo, where it fought in the Eleventh Battle of the Isonzo. The brigade remained in the Vrtojba sector until the Battle of Caporetto forced the Italians to retreat behind the Piave river. On 8 November, the remnants of the brigade reached Padua. At the end of November the brigade was sent to Valstagna and tasked with blocking the Brenta valley there. On 13 December 1917, the brigade was transferred to the Monte Grappa massif to reinforce the Italian positions on Monte Asolone during the First Battle of Monte Grappa. On 16 December the brigade fought in the Italian attack to retake the summits of Col Caprile, Col della Beretta, and Monte Asolone. On 18 December, the brigade came under heavy Austro-Hungarian attacks on Monte Asolone and after suffering 2,613 casualties had to abandon the summit. On 21 December 1917, the brigade was sent to the rear to be rebuilt.

The brigade was again on the Monte Grappa during the Second Battle of the Piave River. On 15 June 1918, the day the Austro-Hungarian offensive began, the brigade had to fall back to its second line of defense, but the next day the brigade counterattacked and retook its lost positions. During the decisive Battle of Vittorio Veneto the brigade was once more on the Monte Grappa, from where it pursued the fleeing Austro-Hungarian troops to Fiera di Primiero. For its conduct and bravery during the war, especially during the Battle of Asiago, the Second Battle of the Piave River, and the Battle of Vittorio Veneto, the 41st Infantry Regiment was awarded a Silver Medal of Military Valor, which was affixed to the regiment's flag and added to the regiment's coat of arms.

=== Interwar years ===
On 10 November 1926, the Brigade "Modena" was renamed V Infantry Brigade. The brigade was the infantry component of the 5th Territorial Division of Genoa, which also included the 29th Field Artillery Regiment. On the same date the brigade's two infantry regiments were renamed 41st Infantry Regiment "Modena", respectively 42nd Infantry Regiment "Modena". The V Infantry Brigade also received the 89th Infantry Regiment "Salerno" from the disbanded Brigade "Salerno". On 30 November 1926, the Brigade "Calabria" and the 60th Infantry Regiment were disbanded and the two battalions of the disbanded regiment transferred to the 41st Infantry Regiment "Modena" and 42nd Infantry Regiment "Modena".

On 20 October 1929, the command of the division moved from Genoa to Imperia and was consequently renamed 5th Territorial Division of Imperia. In 1931, the 41st Infantry Regiment "Modena" moved from Savona to Imperia. On 1 January 1935, the 5th Territorial Division of Imperia changed its name to 5th Infantry Division "Cosseria". A name change that also extended to the division's infantry brigade.

=== Second Italo-Ethiopian War ===
On 19 August 1935, the "Cosseria" division was mobilized in preparation for the Second Italo-Ethiopian War. In September 1935, the division, with the 41st Infantry Regiment "Modena", 42nd Infantry Regiment "Modena", the 29th Artillery Regiment "Cosseria", was shipped to Benghazi in Libya. In early January 1936, the division was sent to Eritrea, where it moved to Adi Quala to guard the Italian supply lines in Ethiopia. From 29 February to 2 March 1936, the division fought in the Battle of Shire and then advanced to Addi Onfito, reaching Axum by April 1936. From there the division advanced to Adwa. In September 1936, the division was repatriated. For its service in Ethiopia between 3 October 1935 and 5 May 1936, the 41st Infantry Regiment "Modena" was awarded, like all infantry units, which had participated in the war, a Military Order of Italy, which was affixed to the regiment's flag.

On 25 March 1939, the 5th Infantry Division "Cosseria" received the 90th Infantry Regiment "Salerno" from the 1st Infantry Division "Superga" and on the same date transferred the 41st Infantry Regiment "Modena", 42nd Infantry Regiment "Modena", and 29th Artillery Regiment "Cosseria" to the newly formed 37th Infantry Division "Modena". Upon entering the new division the 29th Artillery Regiment "Cosseria" was renamed 29th Artillery Regiment "Modena".

=== World War II ===
At the outbreak of World War II, the 41st Infantry Regiment "Modena" consisted of a command, a command company, three fusilier battalions, a support weapons battery equipped with 65/17 infantry support guns, and a mortar company equipped with 81mm Mod. 35 mortars.

==== Invasion of France ====
On 10 June 1940, Italy entered World War II by invading France. During the invasion the 37th Infantry Division "Modena" was assigned to XV Army Corps and tasked to occupy the section of the French-Italian border between Monte Grammondo and the Cima Bavasina. On 21 June 1940, the division crossed the border near the Cima di Anan and Mont Aine to the East of Breil-sur-Roya, aiming for the fortified pass of Col de Brouis and the pass of Col du Perus. But already on Mont Razet French forces blocked the division's path. On 22 June, the 41st Infantry Regiment "Modena" took the summit of Mont Razet, but the next day a French counterattack drove the regiment back. On 24 June 1940, the Franco-Italian Armistice was signed and the "Modena" division was ordered to move to the city of Belluno, where it remained until November 1940. For taking the summit of Mont Razet on 22–23 June 1940, the 41st Infantry Regiment "Modena" was awarded a War Cross of Military Valor, which was affixed to the regiment's flag.

==== Greco-Italian War ====
In November 1940, the 37th Infantry Division "Modena" was transferred to Albania to shore up the crumbling Italian front during the Greco-Italian War. On 16 November 1940, division assembled near Derviçian south of Gjirokastër and held the frontline together with 47th Infantry Division "Bari" on the right flank of the 23rd Infantry Division "Ferrara". On 3 December 1940, the "Modena" division replaced the heavily decimated "Ferrara" division. The "Modena" division was able to resist Greek attacks on Maja e Buzë Derrit until 6 December 1940, but on 12 December the Greeks shifted their attacks to the Progonat-Golëm sector and quickly achieved breakthroughs in the "Modena" division's line. The division brought its reserves forward and retook its positions by nightfall, but on 13 December 1940, the Italian positions at Golëm pass were overrun by Greek forces. Greek troops quickly advanced more than 10 kilometers and reached mount Mali i Pleshevices, where Italian units managed to halt the Greek advance. On 15 December 1940, the "Modena" division was forced to abandon Progonat and retreat further into Albania. The loss of the "Modena" division's positions on mount Maja e Buzë Derrit endangered the positions of the remnants of the "Ferrara" division, which was forced to undertake costly counterattacks. On 19 December 1940, the "Modena" division made a stand between Gusmar and Lekdush villages in Kurvelesh municipality, managing to finally stop the Greek advance. On 31 December 1941, the positions of "Modena" division were reinforced by the 231st Infantry Regiment "Brennero" of the 11th Infantry Division "Brennero".

In January 1941, the "Modena" division, held mountainous terrain near Kurvelesh, which led to difficulties to adequately supply the division and forced the Italians to use aircraft to air drop supplies. On 9–10 March 1941, the "Modena" division undertook diversionary attacks near Progonat to prevent a transfer of Greek forces to Kolonjë, where the main thrust of the Italian spring offensive was underway. After Greek resistance collapsed the division advanced and captured Golëm and Mali i Thate in the Tepelenë District on 13–14 April 1941. For its conduct on the Greek Front between 16 November 1940 and 23 April 1941, the 41st Infantry Regiment "Modena" was awarded a Silver Medal of Military Valor, which was affixed to the regiment's flag and added to the regiment's coat of arms.

==== Occupation of Greece ====
After the Greek surrender the "Modena" division was deployed in Epirus on occupation duty. The division's main garrisons were in Ioannina and Preveza. On 1 November 1941, the depot of the 41st Infantry Regiment "Modena" in Imperia formed the 341st Infantry Regiment "Modena", which was intended to reinforce for the division in Epirus. However on 15 May 1942, the 341st Infantry Regiment "Modena" was assigned to the LI Special Brigade, which occupied the Eastern portion of the island of Crete. On 8 September 1943, the Armistice of Cassibile was announced and the 37th Infantry Division "Modena" and its regiments were disbanded by invading German forces on 21 September 1943.

=== Cold War ===
During the 1975 army reform the army disbanded the regimental level and newly independent battalions were granted for the first time their own flags. On 20 October 1975, the Lagunari Regiment "Serenissima" was disbanded and the regiment's Battalion "Isonzo" in Villa Vicentina became an autonomous unit and was renamed 41st Mechanized Infantry Battalion "Modena". The battalion consisted of a command, a command and services company, three mechanized companies with M113 armored personnel carriers, and a heavy mortar company with M106 mortar carriers with 120mm Mod. 63 mortars. At the time the battalion fielded 896 men (45 officers, 100 non-commissioned officers, and 751 soldiers).

On 1 November 1975, battalion was assigned to the newly formed Mechanized Brigade "Gorizia". On 12 November 1976, the President of the Italian Republic Giovanni Leone assigned with decree 846 the flag and traditions of the 41st Infantry Regiment "Modena" to the 41st Mechanized Infantry Battalion "Modena".

For its conduct and work after the 1976 Friuli earthquake the battalion was awarded a Bronze Medal of Army Valor, which was affixed to the battalion's flag and added to the battalion's coat of arms.

=== Recent times ===
On 1 May 1991, the 183rd Mechanized Infantry Battalion "Nembo" was disbanded in Gradisca d'Isonzo and the 41st Mechanized Infantry Battalion "Modena" moved from Villa Vicentina to Gradisca d'Isonzo, where the battalion incorporated the personnel and materiel of the disbanded "Nembo" battalion. On 3 September 1992, the 41st Mechanized Infantry Battalion "Modena" lost its autonomy and the next day the battalion entered the reformed 41st Infantry Regiment "Modena".

On 27 September 1995, the 41st Mechanized Infantry Battalion "Modena" transferred the flag of the 41st Infantry Regiment "Modena" to the Shrine of the Flags in the Vittoriano in Rome. Three days later, on 30 September 1995, the 41st Mechanized Infantry Battalion "Modena" was disbanded.
