= 5th Infantry Division "Cosseria" =

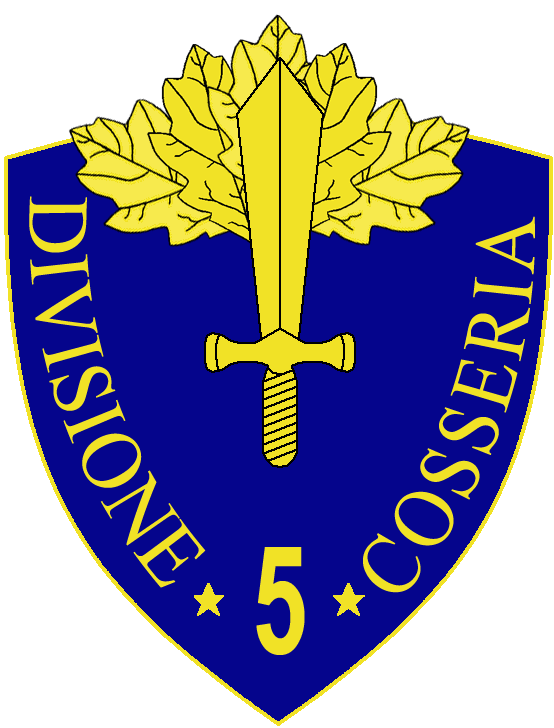
- 5th Infantry Division "Cosseria" insignia
- Active: 1 January 1935 – 12 September 1943
- Country: Kingdom of Italy
- Branch: Royal Italian Army
- Type: Infantry
- Size: Division
- Garrison/HQ: Imperia
- Engagements: Second Italo-Ethiopian War; World War II

Insignia
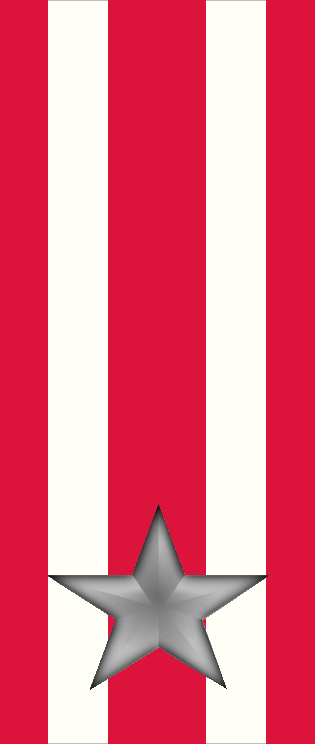
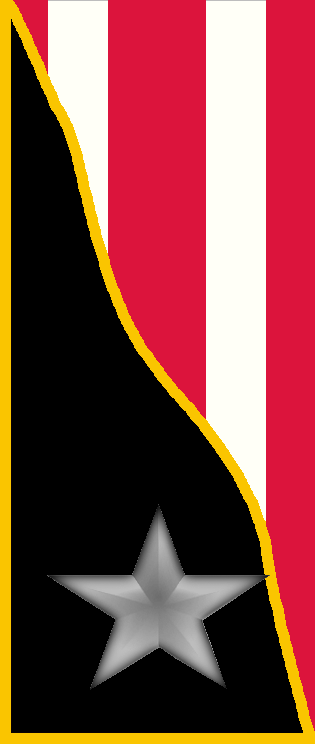
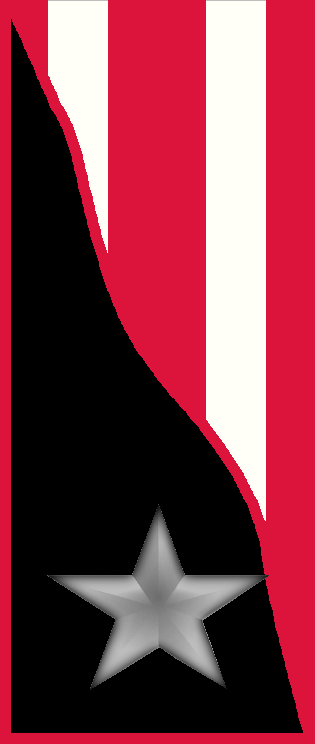
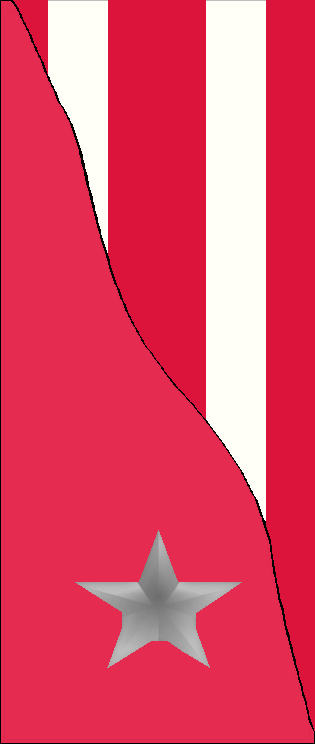
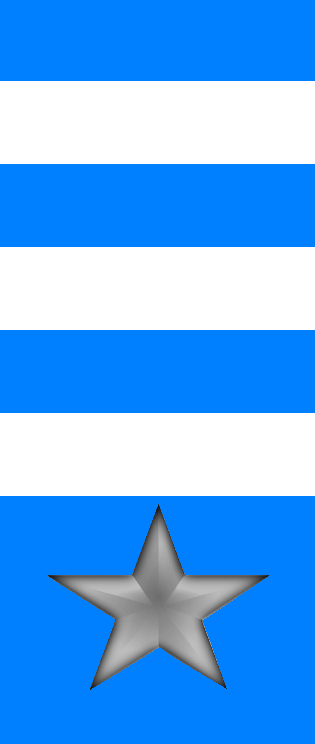
- Identification symbol: Cosseria Division gorget patches

The 5th Infantry Division "Cosseria" (Italian: 5ª Divisione di fanteria "Cosseria") was an infantry division of the Royal Italian Army during World War II. The Cosseria was named for the Battle of Cosseria fought in 1796 during the War of the First Coalition. The division recruited primarily in Liguria and its infantry regiments were based in Ventimiglia (89th) and Genoa (90th), while the artillery regiment was based in Albenga.

== History ==
The division's lineage begins with the Brigade "Salerno" established in Bologna on 1 November 1884 with the 89th and 90th Infantry Regiments.

=== World War I ===
During World War I the brigade fought initially on the Italian front, but in April 1918 it was transferred together with the Brigade "Alpi", Brigade "Brescia", and Brigade "Napoli" to the Western Front in France. There the brigades fought in the Third Battle of the Aisne, Second Battle of the Marne, Battle of Saint-Thierry, and the Hundred Days Offensive.

On 1 November 1926 the brigade was disbanded and its two regiments were transferred to the other brigades: the 89th Infantry Regiment "Salerno" to the V Infantry Brigade and the 90th Infantry Regiment "Salerno" to the I Infantry Brigade. The V Infantry Brigade, which also included the 41st Infantry Regiment "Modena" and the 42nd Infantry Regiment "Modena", was the infantry component of the 5th Territorial Division of Genoa, which also included the 29th Artillery Regiment. On 20 October 1929 the division moved to Imperia and consequently changed its name to 5th Territorial Division of Imperia. On 1 January 1935 the division changed its name to 5th Infantry Division "Cosseria".

=== Second Italo-Ethiopian War ===
In preparation for the Second Italo-Ethiopian War the division was mobilized on 19 August 1935 with the 41st and 42nd infantry regiments and the 29th Artillery Regiment and shipped in September to Benghazi in Libya. In early January 1936 the division was shipped to Eritrea and moved to Adi Quala, where it guarded the supply lines of the Italian divisions fighting in Ethiopia. In March, it started to advance to Addi Onfito, reaching Axum in April 1936 and then continuing to the Adwa area. In September 1936 the division was repatriated.

From August 1935 to September 1936, while the Cosseria division was in Africa, the division's depots continued to train conscrips, who were used to temporarily reform the 48th Artillery Regiment, which was assigned to the temporarily formed 105th Infantry Division "Cosseria II". The Cosseria II also included the Cosseria division's 89th Infantry Regiment "Salerno" and the 43rd Infantry Regiment "Forlì", which had been transferred from the 3rd Infantry Division "Monferrato". After the 5th Infantry Division "Cosseria" returned from Ethiopia the 105th Infantry Division "Cosseria II" and the 48th Artillery Regiment were disbanded and the regiment's personnel was transferred to the returning 29th Artillery Regiment. At the same time the 43rd Infantry Regiment "Forlì" returned to the 3rd Infantry Division "Monferrato".

=== World War II ===
On 25 March 1939 the division ceded all its regiments, except the 89th Infantry Regiment "Salerno", to the newly activated 37th Infantry Division "Modena". On the same date the V Infantry Brigade was dissolved and the 90th Infantry Regiment "Salerno" was transferred from the 1st Infantry Division "Superga" to the Cosseria. The same day the 89th and 90th infantry regiments changed their names to "Cosseria". On 3 September 1939, the depot of the 29th Artillery Regiment "Modena" in Albenga formed the 37th Artillery Regiment "Cosseria" for the division.

==== Invasion of France ====
On 10 June 1940, it was deployed on the French border, in the area between Cima Longoira and the sea. On 20 June 1940 the Cosseria assaulted French positions at the bridges of Via Aurelia (Corso Francia) and Ponte San Luigi over the Ro San Luigi river near the coast, and on the San Paolo mountain pass near I Colletti, in the Ventimiglia commune. Although the attack through over the bridges was repulsed, the Cosseria succeeded in taking the pass of San Paolo on 22 June 1940. As a result the French forces defending the bridges over the Ro San Luigi and in the Menton area were outflanked, with Italian units capturing rural areas between Castellar and Roquebrune. The Cosseria remained in the occupied France until the middle of August 1940, when it was transferred for coastal defence duties in western Liguria.

==== Eastern Front ====
The division was one of ten divisions that served on the Eastern Front as part of the Italian Army in Russia. The Cosseria division received orders to move from Liguria to Eastern Ukraine in June 1942. Before leaving Italy the Cosseria exchanged artillery regiments with the 103rd Infantry Division "Piacenza", as the Piacenza's 108th Motorized Artillery Regiment was equipped with modern 75/18 Mod. 34 howitzers, which were considered to be of better use in the Soviet Union than the World War I vintage 75/27 Mod. 06 field guns of the Cosseria's 37th Artillery Regiment. The Cosseria arrived in Horlivka in Southern Ukraine in the beginning of July 1942 and initially was used as reserve of the Italian XXXV Army Corps. Following the attacking forces the Cosseria arrived in Stalino (today Donetsk) on 15 July 1942 and in Luhansk on 25 July 1942. It crossed the Seversky Donets river at Stanytsia Luhanska. In the first half of August the Cosseria was transferred to the front-line on the Don river, to the north of the 3rd Infantry Division "Ravenna", taking positions between Novaya Kalitva and Verhny Mamon. From 20 August until 26 August 1942, the Cosseria repelled a Soviet assault without giving up any ground. Further Soviet attacks at Krasno-Orehovo and Derezovka on 11 September 1942, succeeded in pushing back the Cosseria troops, but all losses were recovered by Italian counter-attacks on 12 September 1942. Soon after, the division was moved back to the reserve.

==== Operation Little Saturn ====
On 12 December 1942 Soviet forces began Operation Little Saturn and the Cosseria was hit by powerful Soviet attacks. By 24 December 1942 the division was badly decimated and relieved from frontline duty by German units. The Cosseria's remaining men were partly used to reinforce the 3rd Infantry Division "Ravenna", and partly used to protect supply lines around Rovenky. The rapidly deteriorating situation forced the Cosseria's remnants to retreat to the south-west, first maintaining a front-line, and then in several separate columns. The street fighting began in Rovenky on 2 January 1943. During the Soviet Voronezh Front's operations in the Upper Don area under Golikov, Soviet cavalry struck out very successfully for Valuiki and under the pale winter sun on 19 January the horsemen in black capes and flying hoods charged down the hapless Italians, killing and wounding more than a thousand before the brief resistance by the fleeing, hungry and frostbitten men of the 5th Infantry Division ended.

The few remaining soldiers of the Cosseria then reached Izium, where they linked up with other Axis forces. The further retreat route was through Kharkiv, Okhtyrka, Romny, Pryluky, Nizhyn, finally reaching Novobelitsa at the Southern outskirts of Gomel on 7 March 1943. The division was repatriated in May 1943 and moved to Tuscany, where it started to re-form. On 25 July 1943 the division was assigned for police duties at Sesto San Giovanni. After the announcement of the Armistice of Cassibile on 8 September 1943 the division was dissolved by invading German forces on 12 September 1943.

== Organization ==
=== Second Italo-Ethiopian War ===
- 5th Infantry Division "Cosseria"
  - 41st Infantry Regiment "Modena"
  - 42nd Infantry Regiment "Modena"
  - 29th Artillery Regiment
    - 2 × Artillery groups
  - DV Machine Gun Battalion
  - V Replacements Battalion
  - 5th Engineer Company

Notes:

- Each Army Division in the Ethiopian Campaign had a Pack-Mules unit of 3000 mules and three Regimental Trucks units (20 light trucks each).
- For the campaign in Ethiopia the Cosseria was organized as a binary division with two infantry regiments.

=== World War II ===
5th Infantry Division "Cosseria" organization in 1940

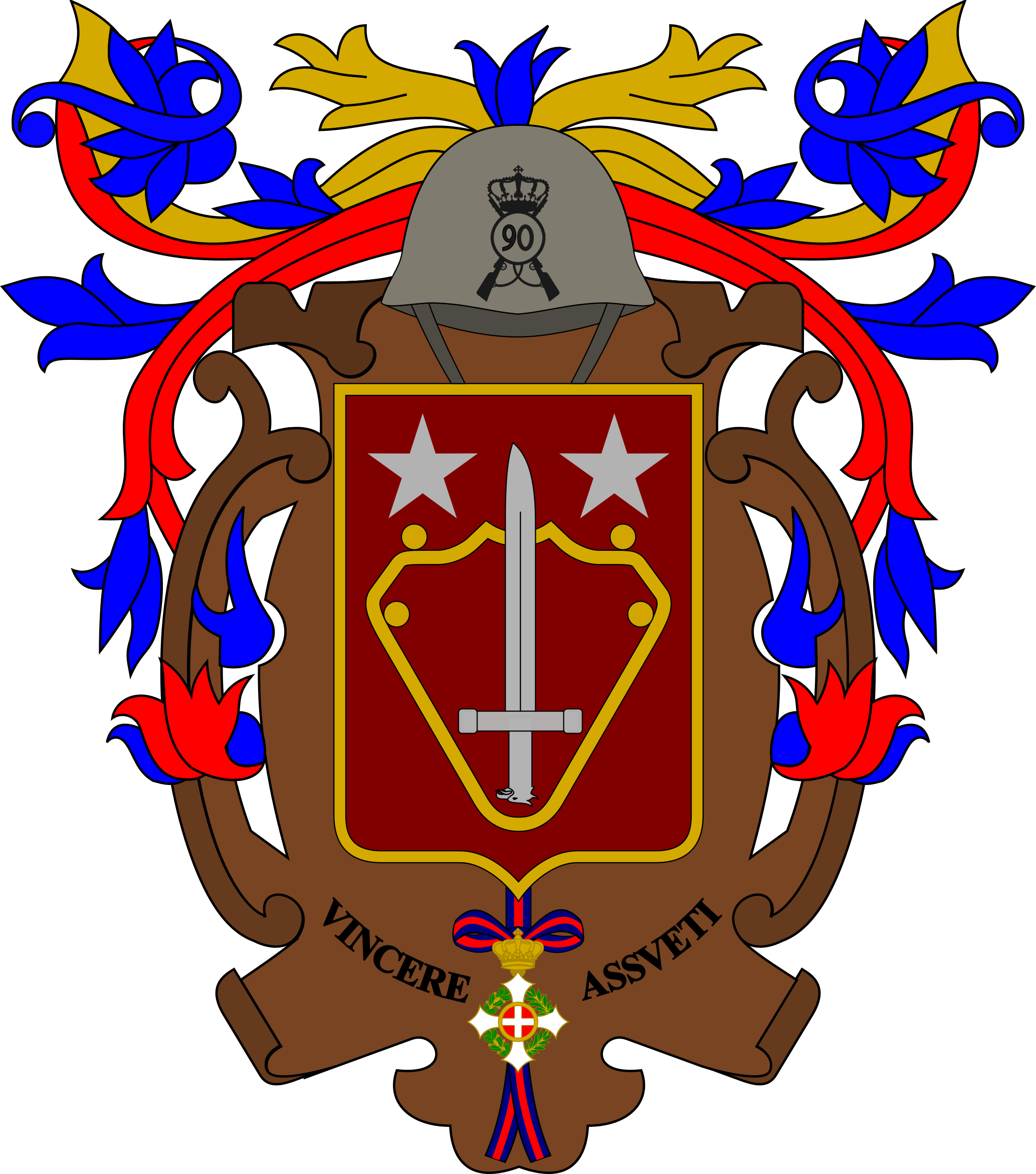
Coat of Arms of the 90th Infantry Regiment "Salerno", 1939

When the division was deployed to the Soviet Union it consisted of the following units:

- 5th Infantry Division "Cosseria", in Imperia
  - Headquarters
    - Command Company
    - 13th Carabinieri Section
    - 14th Carabinieri Section
    - 42nd Field Post Office
    - 5th Infantry Division Command Transport Squad
  - 89th Infantry Regiment "Cosseria", (Note: Named 89th Infantry Regiment "Salerno" until 1939 when the army reorganized its divisions as binary divisions and divisional infantry regiments took the name of the division.) in Ventimiglia
    - Command Company
    - 3 × Fusilier battalions
    - Support Weapons Battery (65/17 mod. 13 infantry support guns)
    - Mortar Company (81mm mod. 35 mortars)
  - 90th Infantry Regiment "Cosseria", (Note: Named 90th Infantry Regiment "Salerno" until 1939 when the army reorganized its divisions as binary divisions and divisional infantry regiments took the name of the division.) in Genoa
    - Command Company
    - 3 × Fusilier battalions
    - Support Weapons Battery (65/17 mod. 13 infantry support guns)
    - Mortar Company (81mm mod. 35 mortars)
  - 37th Artillery Regiment "Cosseria", in Imperia (left the division on 15 May 1941, and joined the 103rd Infantry Division "Piacenza" on 5 July 1942)
    - Command Unit
    - I Group (100/17 mod. 14 howitzers; formed by the depot of the 27th Artillery Regiment "Cuneo")
    - II Group (75/27 mod. 06 field guns; transferred from the 29th Artillery Regiment "Modena")
    - III Group (75/13 mod. 15 mountain guns; transferred from the 3rd Artillery Regiment "Pistoia")
    - 1 × Anti-aircraft battery (20/65 mod. 35 anti-aircraft guns)
    - Ammunition and Supply Unit
  - 108th Artillery Regiment "Cosseria" (Note: Named 108th Motorized Artillery Regiment until it joined the division took the name of the division.) (transferred from the 103rd Infantry Division "Piacenza" in June 1942)
    - Command Unit
    - I Group (75/18 mod. 35 howitzers)
    - II Group (75/18 mod. 35 howitzers)
    - III Group (75/18 mod. 35 howitzers; transferred in May 1942 to the 17th Artillery Regiment "Sforzesca")
    - IV Group (105/28 cannons)
    - 72nd Anti-tank Battery (75/39 anti-tank guns; attached during the deployment in the Soviet Union)
    - 87th Anti-aircraft Battery (20/65 mod. 35 anti-aircraft guns)
    - 305th Anti-aircraft Battery (20/65 mod. 35 anti-aircraft guns)
    - Ammunition and Supply Unit
  - V Mortar Battalion (81mm mod. 35 mortars; detached to the 9th Infantry Division "Pasubio" during the campaign in the Soviet Union)
  - CV Mortar Battalion (81mm mod. 35 mortars; formed in April 1942)
  - 5th Anti-tank Company (47/32 mod. 35 anti-tank guns)
  - 135th Anti-tank Company (47/32 mod. 35 anti-tank guns; replaced in 1941 by the 135th Anti-tank Company)
  - 355th Anti-tank Company (47/32 mod. 35 anti-tank guns; transferred from the 155th Infantry Division "Emilia" for the deployment in the Soviet Union)
  - 5th Telegraph and Radio Operators Company
  - 23rd Engineer Company
  - 47th Medical Section
    - 118th Field Hospital
    - 119th Field Hospital
    - 513th Field Hospital
    - 515th Field Hospital
    - 105th Surgical Unit
  - 5th Autocarrette Section
  - 48th Supply Section (expanded to 48th Supply Unit for the deployment to the Soviet Union)
  - 134th Transport Section
  - 248th Transport Section (attached for the deployment in the Soviet Union)

Attached during the invasion of France in 1940:

- LXXXVI CC.NN. Battalion

Attached from 1941 until early 1942:

- 86th CC.NN. Legion "Intrepida"
  - Command Company
  - LXXV CC.NN. Battalion
  - LXXXVI CC.NN. Battalion
  - 86th CC.NN. Machine Gun Company

== Military honors ==
For their conduct during the campaign in the Soviet Union the President of Italy awarded on 31 December 1947 to the two infantry regiments of the 5th Infantry Division "Cosseria" Italy's highest military honor, the Gold Medal of Military Valor.

- 89th Infantry Regiment "Cosseria" on 31 December 1947
- 90th Infantry Regiment "Cosseria" on 31 December 1947

== Commanding officers ==
The division's commanding officers were:

- Generale di Divisione Alberto Vasari (1940 - 19 June 1940)
- Generale di Divisione Umberto Mondadori (acting, 20 June 1940 - 2 September 1940)
- Generale di Divisione Enrico Gazzale (3 September 1940 - July 1943)
- Generale di Divisione Vincenzo Robertiello (July 1943 - 12 September 1943)
