= 37th Infantry Division "Modena" =

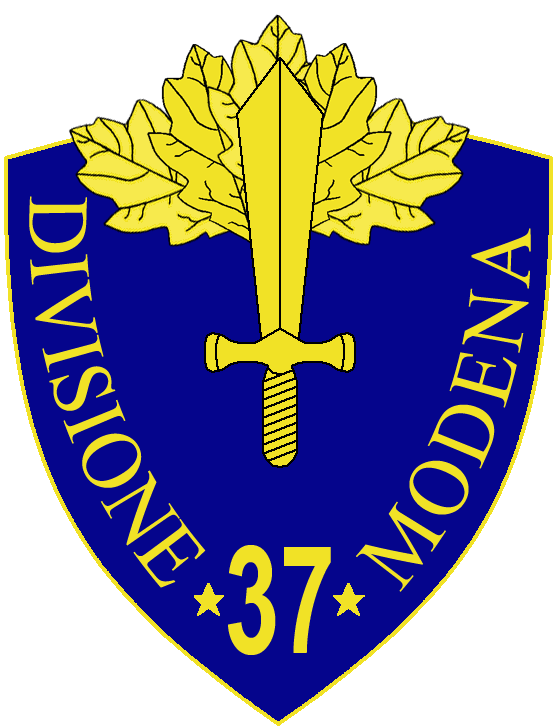
- 37th Infantry Division "Modena" insignia
- Active: 1939–1943
- Country: Kingdom of Italy
- Branch: Royal Italian Army
- Type: Infantry
- Size: Division
- Garrison/HQ: Savona
- Engagements: World War II; Italian invasion of France; Greco-Italian War

Commanders
- Notable commanders: General Alessandro Gloria

Insignia
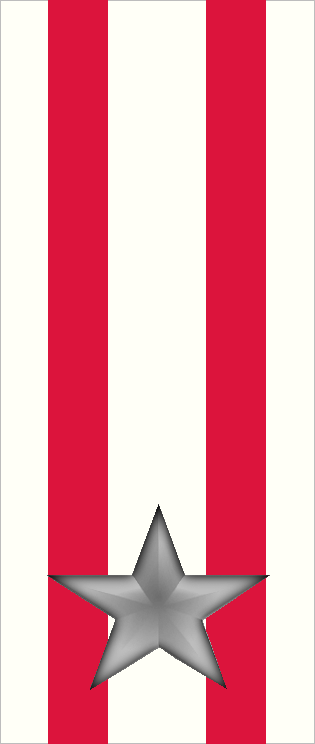
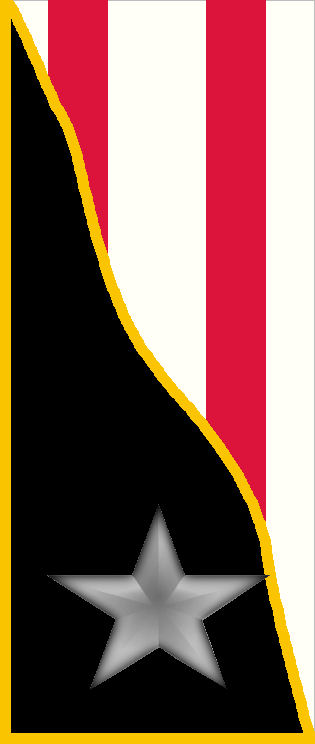
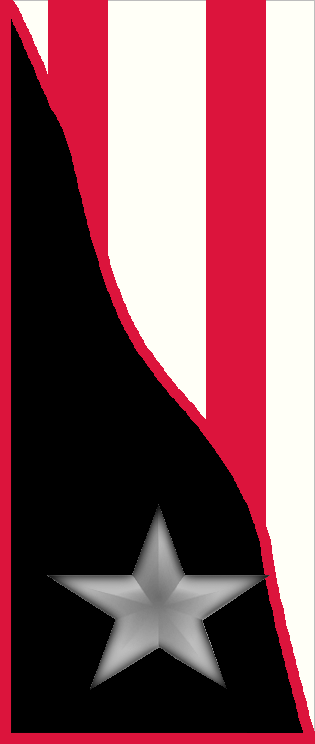
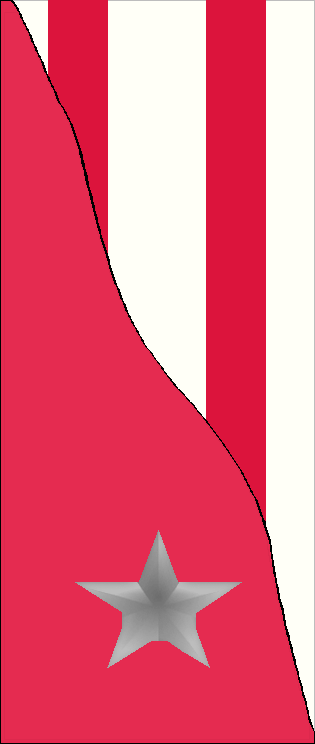
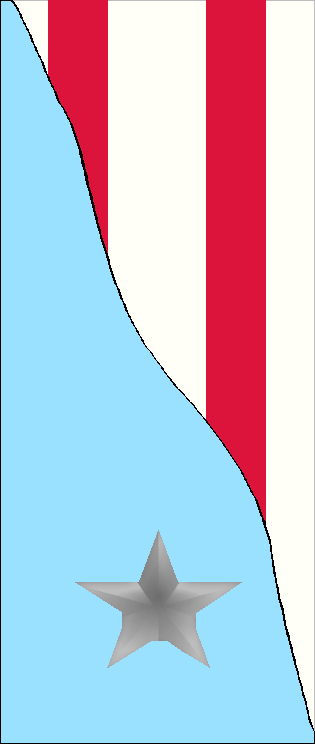
- Identification symbol: Modena Division gorget patches

The 37th Infantry Division "Modena" (Italian: 37ª Divisione di fanteria "Modena") was a infantry division of the Royal Italian Army during World War II. The Modena was a mountain-type infantry division, which meant that the division's artillery and logistics were moved by pack mules, while in standard infantry divisions artillery and logistics were moved by horse-drawn limbers and carriages. Italy's real mountain warfare divisions were the six alpine divisions manned by Alpini troops. The division was formed on 25 March 1939 with units of the 5th Territorial Division "Imperia" and named for the city of Modena. The division was made up entirely of men from the city of Genoa and the surrounding Liguria region. The division's regimental depots were shared with the 63rd Infantry Division "Cirene", which was based in Benghazi in Libya and recruited its men from and trained them in Liguria.

== History ==
The division's lineage begins with the Brigade "Modena" established on 1 August 1859 with the 1st Regiment "Cacciatori della Magra" and 2nd Regiment "Cacciatori della Magra" of the Army of the United Provinces of Central Italy. On 25 March 1860 the Brigade "Modena" entered the Royal Sardinian Army three days after the Kingdom of Sardinia had annexed the United Provinces of Central Italy. Already before entering the Royal Sardinian Army the brigade's two infantry regiments had been renumbered on 30 December 1859 as 41st Infantry Regiment and 42nd Infantry Regiment.

=== World War I ===
The brigade fought on the Italian front in World War I. On 10 November 1926 the brigade assumed the name of V Infantry Brigade and received the 89th Infantry Regiment "Salerno" from the disbanded Brigade "Salerno". The V Infantry Brigade was the infantry component of the 5th Territorial Division of Genoa, which also included the 29th Artillery Regiment. On 20 October 1929 the division moved to Imperia and consequently changed its name to 5th Territorial Division of Imperia. On 1 January 1935 the division changed its name to 5th Infantry Division "Cosseria".

=== Second Italo-Ethiopian War ===
In preparation for the Second Italo-Ethiopian War the 5th Infantry Division "Cosseria" was mobilized on 19 August 1935 with the 41st and 42nd infantry regiments and the 29th Artillery Regiment and shipped in September to Benghazi in Libya. In early January 1936 the division was shipped to Eritrea and moved to Adi Quala, where it guarded the supply lines of the Italian divisions fighting in Ethiopia. From 29 February to 2 March 1936, the division fought in the Battle of Shire and then advanced to Addi Onfito, reaching Axum by April 1936. From there the division advanced to Adwa. In September 1936 the division was repatriated.

=== World War II ===
On 25 March 1939 the 5th Infantry Division "Cosseria" ceded the 41st and 42nd infantry regiments and the 29th Artillery Regiment, to the newly activated 37th Infantry Division "Modena".

==== Invasion of France ====
On 10 June 1940 Italy entered World War II by invading France. For the invasion the Modena was assigned to XV Army Corps, and tasked to secure the section of the French-Italian border between Monte Grammondo and the Cima Bavasina. The division crossed the border on 21 June 1940 near the Cima di Anan and mount Aine to the East of Breil-sur-Roya, aiming for the fortified pass of Col de Brouis and the pass of Col du Perus. After the Franco-Italian Armistice was signed on 24 June 1940 the Modena was transferred to Belluno, where it remained until November 1940.

==== Greco-Italian War ====
In November 1940 the Modena was sent to Albania to reinforce Italian units fighting in the Greco-Italian War. The division assembled near Derviçian south of Gjirokastër and operated with 47th Infantry Division "Bari" on the right flank of the 23rd Infantry Division "Ferrara". On 3 December 1940 the Modena relieved the heavily decimated Ferrara. The Modena was able to resist Greek attacks on Maja e Buzë Derrit until 6 December 1940, but on 12 December the Greeks shifted their attacks on the Modena to the Progonat-Golëm sector and quickly achieved breakthroughs.

The Modena brought its reserves forward and regained its positions by nightfall, but the Italian positions at the pass of Golëm were overrun by Greek forces on 13 December 1940. The Greek forces advanced more than 10 kilometers to mount Mali i Pleshevices, where Italian units with difficulty stopped the Greek advance. On 15 December the Modena continued the retreat and abandoned Progonat. At about the same time, the loss of mount Maja e Buzë Derrit by the Modena endangered the positions of the remnants of the Ferrara, which was forced to undertake costly counter-attacks. On 19 December 1940 the Modena made a stand between Gusmar and Lekdush villages in Kurvelesh municipality, managing to stop the Greek advance. On 31 December 1941 the positions of Modena were reinforced by the 231st Infantry Regiment "Brennero" of the 11th Infantry Division "Brennero", and on 10 January 1941 during defence of Tepelenë, by the 18th Infantry Regiment "Acqui" of 33rd Infantry Division "Acqui" and the 232nd Infantry Regiment "Brennero".

In January 1941 the Modena held mountainous terrain near Kurvelesh. Although the terrain favored the defender it also led to difficulties to adequately supply the division, with large fraction of the supplies delivered by aircraft. On 9–10 March 1941, the Modena undertook diversionary attacks near Progonat to tie up Greek forces and prevent reinforcements reaching Kolonjë, where the main thrust of the Italian spring offensive was underway. After Greek resistance collapsed the Modena advanced and captured Golëm and Mali i Thate in the Tepelenë District on 13–14 April 1941.

==== Occupation of Greece ====
After the Greek surrender the Modena remained in Greece as an occupation force in the Epirus region. The divisions main garrisons were in Ioannina and Preveza. After the Armistice of Cassibile was announced on 8 September 1943, the Modena was disbanded by invading German forces on 21 September 1943.

== Organization ==
37th Infantry Division "Modena" organization in 1940

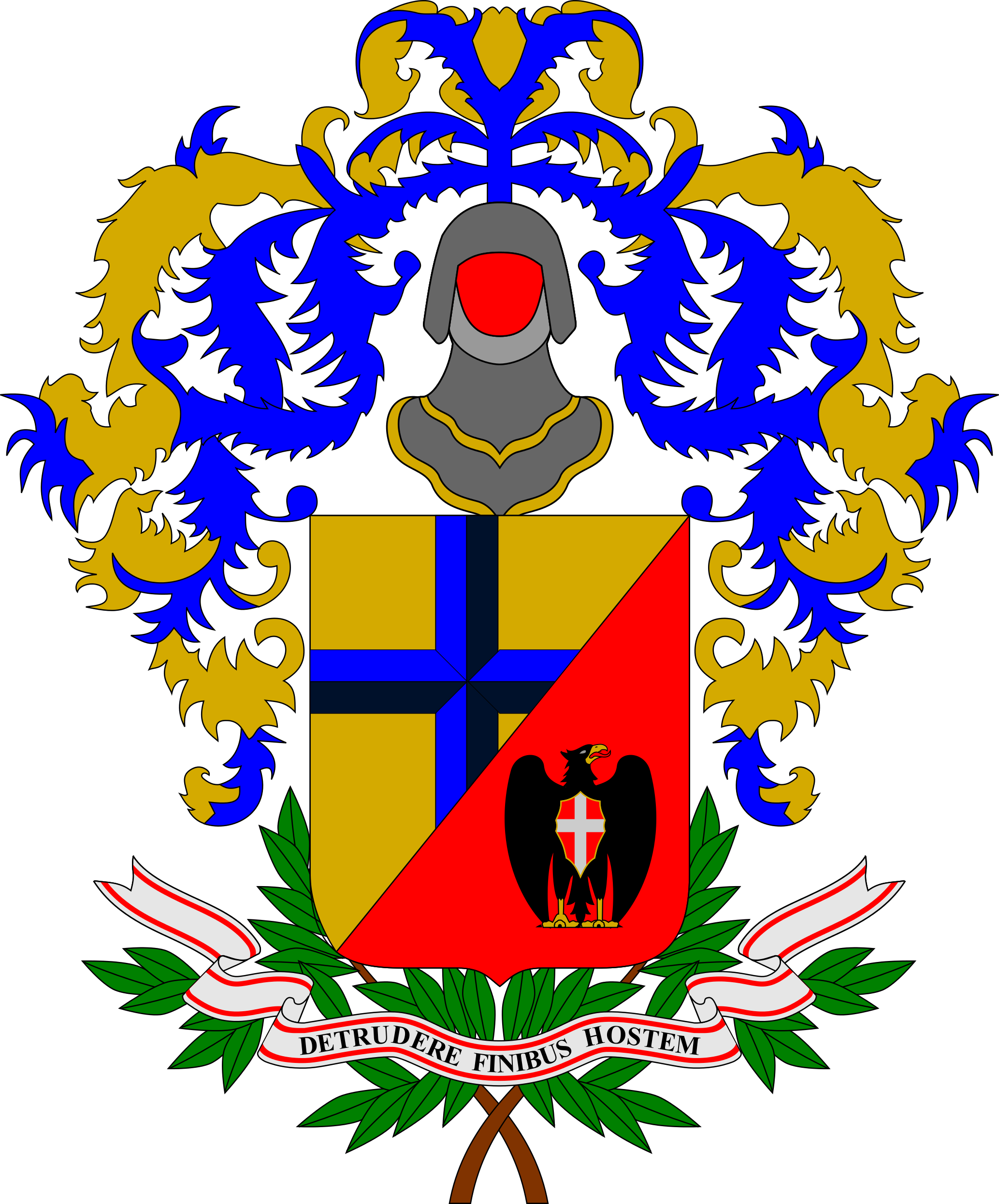
Coat of Arms of the 42nd Infantry Regiment "Modena", 1939

- 37th Infantry Division "Modena", in Savona
  - Headquarters
    - Command Company
    - 15th Carabinieri Section
    - 76th Carabinieri Section
    - 37th Field Post Office
    - 37th Infantry Division Command Transport Squad
  - 41st Infantry Regiment "Modena", in Savona
    - Command Company
    - 3 × Fusilier battalions
    - Support Weapons Battery (65/17 mod. 13 infantry support guns)
    - Mortar Company (81mm mod. 35 mortars)
  - 42nd Infantry Regiment "Modena", in Genoa
    - Command Company
    - 3 × Fusilier battalions
    - Support Weapons Battery (65/17 mod. 13 infantry support guns)
    - Mortar Company (81mm mod. 35 mortars)
  - 341st Infantry Regiment "Modena" (raised on 1 November 1941 by the depot of the 41st Infantry Regiment "Modena", transferred to the LI Special Brigade "Lecce" on Crete in May 1942)
    - Command Company
    - 3 × Fusiliers battalions
    - Cannons Company (47/32 mod. 35 anti-tank guns)
    - Mortar Company (81mm mod. 35 mortars)
  - 29th Artillery Regiment "Modena", in Albenga
    - Command Unit
    - I Group (100/17 mod. 14 howitzers)
    - II Group (75/13 mod. 15 mountain guns)
    - III Group (75/13 mod. 15 mountain guns)
    - 1 × Anti-aircraft battery (20/65 mod. 35 anti-aircraft guns)
    - Ammunition and Supply Unit
  - XXXVII Mortar Battalion (81mm mod. 35 mortars)
  - 37th Anti-tank Company (47/32 mod. 35 anti-tank guns)
  - 19th Engineer Company
  - 37th Telegraph and Radio Operators Company
  - 48th Medical Section
  - Supply Section
  - Transport Section
  - 44th Train Section (equipped with mules)

Attached to the division in June 1940:

- 36th CC.NN. Legion "Cristoforo Colombo"
  - XXXIV CC.NN. Battalion
  - XXXVI CC.NN. Battalion (remained attached to the division until September 1943)
  - 36th CC.NN. Machine Gun Company

Attached to the division in 1943:

- V Carabinieri Battalion
- CX Machine Gun Battalion
- DXVIII Mobile Territorial Battalion
- CC.NN. Group "Etna"
- XXXII Group (105/28 cannons; formed by the 26th Army Corps Artillery Regiment)
- CXVI Group (149/13 heavy howitzers; formed by the 26th Army Corps Artillery Regiment)
- CLIV Artillery Group

== Commanding officers ==
The division's commanding officers were:

- Generale di Divisione Carlo Rossi (25 March 1939 - 9 June 1940)
- Generale di Divisione Alessandro Gloria (10 June 1940 - 29 November 1940)
- Colonel Francesco Sclavo (acting, 30 November - 15 December 1940)
- Generale di Brigata Luigi Trionfi (acting, 16-26 December 1940)
- Generale di Brigata Giovanni Magli (acting, 27 December 1940 - 30 January 1941)
- Generale di Divisione Alessandro Gloria (31 January 1941 - 27 August 1941)
- Generale di Divisione Mario Guassardo (28 August 1941 - 3 November 1942)
- Generale di Brigata Erberto Papini (4 November 1942 - 21 September 1943)
