= Matteo Roux =

Italian general

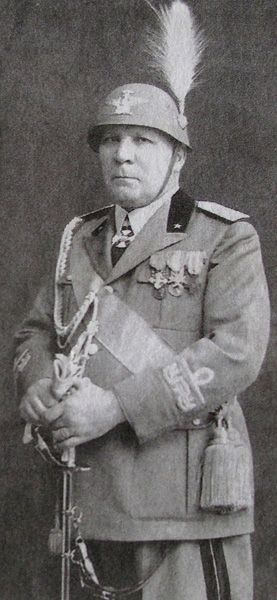
- Born: 14 July 1881; Bellino, Kingdom of Italy
- Died: 3 July 1952; Chiavari, Italy
- Military career
- Allegiance: Kingdom of Italy
- Branch: Royal Italian Army
- Rank: Lieutenant General
- Commands: 3rd Infantry Division "Monferrato"; Albania Army Corps; XI Army Corps
- Conflicts: World War I; Second Italo-Ethiopian War; Italian invasion of Albania; World War II; Greco-Italian War
- Awards: War Merit Cross; Order of Saints Maurice and Lazarus; Order of the Crown of Italy

Matteo Roux (Bellino, 14 July 1881 – Chiavari, 3 July 1952) was an Italian general during World War II.

== Biography ==
The second of three children, he was born in Bellino, province of Cuneo, on 14 July 1881, the son of Bernardo Roux, a craftsman by profession, and of Maria Allemand. At a very young age he emigrated with his family to Toulon, France, when his father made a fortune by selling a new type of liqueur, until he decided to return to Italy and settle in Cuneo, where he started a new business as a restorer. The young Matteo became passionate about the world of horse riding, and eventually decided to enroll in the Cavalry School, thus starting his military career. He enlisted in the Royal Italian Army in 1900 and began to attend the Royal Military Academy of Artillery and Engineers in Turin, graduating with the rank of artillery second lieutenant on 13 November 1901. Having become a brilliant horse riding instructor, he was called by the House of Savoy to train Crown Prince Umberto and later Prince Amedeo of Savoy-Aosta. He thus gained access to the royal palaces, learning how to move in such environments with ease, and met Margherita Beauty, a young lady belonging to the nobility of a younger branch of the Savoy family, whom he married in 1903.

He later attended the War School of Turin and became an officer of the General Staff, participating in the First World War. Between 1920 and 1928 he served at the War School of Turin (initially as chief instructor of military history, then as instructor of logistics and finally as chief instructor of logistics), being promoted to colonel and later to brigadier general on 16 June 1934. Between 1935 and 1936 he took part in the Second Italo-Ethiopian War and in the subsequent counterguerrilla operations. After being repatriated he was promoted to major general on 1 July 1937, and assigned to the command of the artillery in Brescia. He then assumed the post of Chief of Staff of the V Corps of Bologna. After serving as Director General of Logistics Services at the Ministry of War, in 1939 he assumed command of the 3rd Infantry Division "Monferrato" (renamed 3rd Infantry Division "Ravenna" in March 1939), and immediately after the occupation of Albania he was appointed commander of the troops deployed there, being later replaced by Carlo Geloso. After promotion to lieutenant general on 1 January 1940, he assumed command of the XI Army Corps, which he maintained after the Kingdom of Italy entered the Second World War on 10 June 1940.

With the beginning of the Greek campaign, due to the unfavorable trend of the military operations, on 1 November 1940 he was replaced by General Mario Robotti, whom in turn he replaced as director of the logistic services of the Ministry of War in Rome. Within a few days he lost both his wife and his daughter Maria, who died after contracting influenza while they were awaiting his return in Bari. In the following years he worked in Rome as Director of Logistic Services at the Ministry of War and continued to frequent the House of Savoy. Having fallen in love with his young maid Maria Manzo, who gave him a son, Mario, he married her a few years later. During this period he built a villa in Fontanile, a hamlet of the municipality of Bellino.

After being discharged from the Army he retired to private life, living between Bellino and Saluzzo for several years. On 1 June 1949 the Prefecture of Cuneo appointed him President of the local hospital. He died suddenly on 3 July 1952, while visiting his sister Margherita in Chiavari.
