= Alessandro Gloria =

Italian general

- Born: 7 July 1883; Rome, Kingdom of Italy
- Died: 24 October 1970 (aged 87); Genoa, Italy
- Military career
- Allegiance: Kingdom of Italy
- Branch: Royal Italian Army
- Rank: Lieutenant General
- Commands: 8th Heavy Field Artillery Regiment; 17th Artillery Regiment "Sforzesca"; III Border Sector; Genoa anti-aircraft defence 37th Infantry Division Modena; XXVI Army Corps; 25th Infantry Division Bologna; XXI Army Corps; V Army Corps; XXXV Army Corps
- Conflicts: Italo-Turkish War; World War I; Isonzo Front; World War II; Battle of the Western Alps; Greco-Italian War; Siege of Tobruk; Operation Crusader; Battle of Alam Halfa; Second Battle of El Alamein; Operation Achse
- Awards: Bronze Medal of Military Valour (five times); Military Order of Savoy; Order of the Crown of Italy

Alessandro Gloria (Rome, 7 July 1883 – Genoa, 24 October 1970) was an Italian general during World War II.

== Biography ==
Gloria was born in Rome on July 7, 1883, the son of Gaspare Gloria and Maria Sacchi. After enlisting in the Royal Italian Army, on 3 November 1901 he enrolled in the Royal Military Academy of Artillery and Engineers in Turin, graduating as artillery Second Lieutenant on 7 September 1903. After promotion to Lieutenant and later to Captain, he fought in Libya with the 7th Field Artillery Regiment during the Italo-Turkish War (1911-1912), earning a Bronze Medal of Military Valour for action near Tripoli in October 1911, and later in World War I with the 32nd Field Artillery Regiment, being badly wounded on the Isonzo Front in January 1916 and receiving a further two Bronze Medals of Military Valour.

After promotion to Major at the end of the war, he went on to serve with the 19th Heavy Field Artillery Regiment, and in 1920 he was transferred to the Headquarters of the Military Division of Turin. After a long period as a teacher at the local War School he became a Lieutenant Colonel and then a Colonel in 1930, being placed at the disposal of the Command of the Army Corps of Turin. He later assumed command of the 8th Heavy Field Artillery Regiment, and became alternate judge at the territorial military court of Rome from 1 July 1931 to 10 February 1933.

Between June 26, 1933, and September 30, 1935, he served in the General Staff of the army in Rome, and from October 1, 1935, to February 1, 1937, he was commander of the 17th Artillery Regiment "Sforzesca" before being assigned to the Army Corps of Alessandria.

After promotion to brigadier general on 1 July 1937 he was appointed commander of the III Border Sector, holding this position until 10 April 1938 when he became deputy commander of the 3rd Infantry Brigade "Monferrato". On March 31, 1939, he was appointed commander of the anti-aircraft artillery of Genoa.

On 1 January 1940 he was promoted to Major General and given command of the 37th Infantry Division Modena, which after Italy's entrance into World War II on 10 June, he led during operations on the western alpine border, earning another Bronze Medal of Military Valour.

On November 24, 1940, he was transferred with his division on the Albanian front, where five days later he was badly wounded during a reconnaissance and temporarily replaced by General Luigi Trionfi. After recovering from his wounds, he retook command of the "Modena" Division on February 1, 1941, leading it till the end of the operations against Greece and receiving a final Bronze Medal of Military Valour. On 5 May he temporarily assumed command of the XXVI Army Corps; on 25 August 1941 he was transferred to Libya and given the command of the 25th Infantry Division Bologna, which he led during the siege of Tobruk, Operation Crusader, the battle of Alam Halfa and the second battle of El Alamein; in October 1942 he was also temporarily given command of the XXI Corps, of which the "Bologna" Division was part. After the destruction of his division at El Alamein, he was repatriated on 6 December, and nine days later he was promoted to Lieutenant General, remaining at the disposal of the Ministry of War until 9 January 1943, when he was given command of the V Army Corps operating in Dalmatia.

On May 5 of the same year he left command of the V Corps and returned to Rome, remaining there until July 27, 1943, when he was given command of the XXXV Army Corps in South Tyrol, with headquarters in Bolzano. Although Marshal of Italy Pietro Badoglio had declared, immediately after the fall of the Fascist regime on 25 July, that the war would continue alongside Germany, it was now clear to the Germans that the Italian government was negotiating surrender with the Allies. In order to prevent this, German troops began crossing the border with Italy and taking control of Alpine passes and valleys, occupying the most strategically important locations. Gloria tried to oppose this, but was unable to stop the Germans, who were also willing to engage in an armed confrontation with the Italians – despite the two countries being still allied – in order to reach their goals. However, when the commander of the newly established Auffrischungsstab München, General Valentin Peter Feuerstein, from Innsbruck, informed Gloria that the 44th Infantry Division would enter Italian territory, he replied that this unit could not enter, threatening armed intervention to oppose it.

Following the Armistice of Cassibile, on 9 September 1943 he was captured by German troops at his headquarters in Bolzano, and then interned in the officer POW Camp 64/Z in Schokken (today Skoki), Poland. He returned to Italy after the end of the war, in October 1945, and was discharged from the Army on July 7, 1956. He died in Genoa on October 24, 1970.
