= XI Army Corps (Italy) =

WW2 Royal Italian Army formation

The XI Army Corps (Italian: XI Corpo d'Armata) was a corps of the Royal Italian Army during World War II that participated in the invasion of Yugoslavia.

== History ==
The XI Army Corps was created in Bari on 8 July 1883, and fought in World War I, after which it was dissolved.

In April 1939, Italy occupied Albania and on 9 November 1940, the occupation troops, known until then as Comando Superiore Truppe Albania, were renamed XI Army Corps, and became part of the 2nd Army. The Corps participated in the Greco-Italian War without much success.

On 11 April 1941, the Corps advanced into Yugoslav territory, reaching and occupying Ljubljana. After the Yugoslav capitulation on 23 April, the Corps remained in Slovenia as an occupation force with its headquarters in Ljubljana. It was involved in anti-partisan operations and brutal repression of the population.

During 1942, the XI Army Corps was moved to Greece as part of the Italian occupation army there. On 25 July 1943, the Corps became part of the German OB Südost and was based in Thessaloniki.

XI Army Corps was disarmed by the Germans and dissolved on 18 September 1943 after the Armistice of Cassibile.

== Commanders ==
- Matteo Roux (1940.01.01 – 1940.11.01)
- Mario Robotti (1940.11.01 – 1942.12.15)
- Gastone Gambara (1942.12.15 – 1943.09.08)
