= Kolonjë, Gjirokastër =

Kolonjë
- Village
- Location within Albania
- Coordinates: 40°10′N 20°01′E
- Country: Albania
- County: Gjirokastër
- Municipality: Gjirokastër
- Administrative unit: Picar

Population (2007)
  - Total: 50
- Time zone: UTC+1 (CET)
  - Summer (DST): UTC+2 (CEST)

Kolonjë is a small village in Gjirokastër County, southern Albania, located northwest of the city Gjirokastër which is about 30 minutes away. At the 2015 local government reform it became part of the municipality Gjirokastër. The village is inhabited by Bektashi Albanians. The village has a festival every year on 10 May called Dhjet Maj (English: The 10 May), when everyone who has left the village returns to celebrate with the villagers. It is also attended by people from other villages.
