= 89th Infantry Regiment "Salerno" =

Inactive Italian Army infantry unit

- 89° Reggimento Fanteria "Salerno"
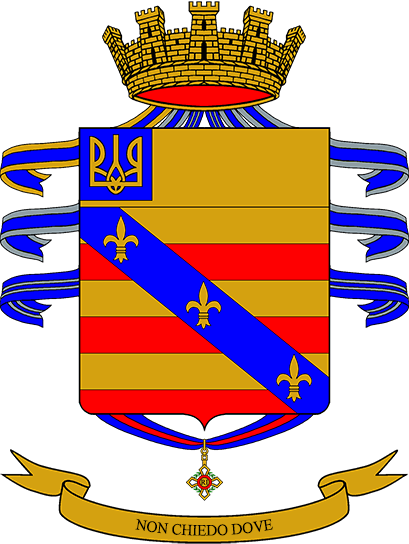
- Regimental coat of arms
- Active: 1 Nov. 1884 – 8 Sept. 1943; 1 July 1958 – 31 Oct. 1974; 1 Nov. 1975 – 31 Jan. 1991
- Country: Italy
- Branch: Italian Army
- Garrison/HQ: Salerno
- Motto: "Non chiedo dove"
- Anniversaries: 17 December 1942 – Battle of the Don
- Decorations: 1× Military Order of Italy; 1× Gold Medal of Military Valor; 3× Silver Medals of Military Valor; 2× War Cross of Military Valor; 1× Croix de guerre avec Palme de bronze

Insignia
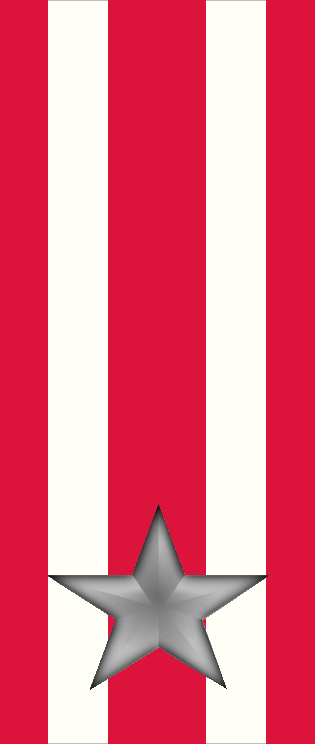
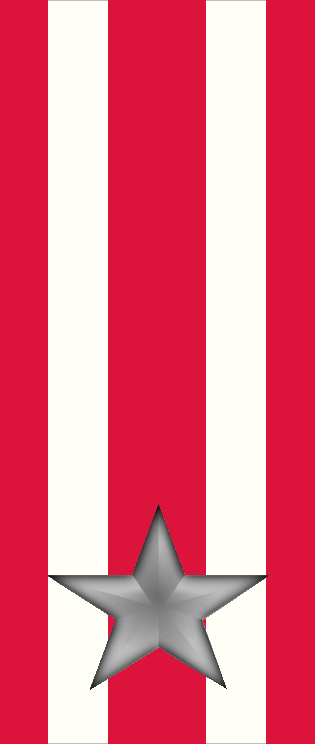
- Regimental gorget patches

The 89th Infantry Regiment "Salerno" (Italian: 89° Reggimento Fanteria "Salerno") is an inactive unit of the Italian Army last based in Salerno. The regiment is named for the city of Salerno and part of the Italian Army's infantry arm.

The regiment was one of sixteen infantry regiments formed on 1 November 1884. In 1911–12 the regiment participated in the Italo-Turkish War and during World War I the regiment fought on the Italian front and the Western Front in France. During World War II the regiment was assigned to the 5th Infantry Division "Cosseria", with which it participated in the Italian invasion of France. In June 1942 the Cosseria division was assigned to the Italian Army in Russia and the regiment fought in southern Ukraine and on the Don river in southern Russia. In December 1942 the division and regiment were destroyed during the Soviet Operation Little Saturn. Reformed in June 1943 in Italy the regiment was disbanded by invading German forces after the announcement of the Armistice of Cassibile on 8 September 1943. For its conduct in Ukraine and Russia the regiment was awarded Italy's highest military honor the Gold Medal of Military Valor. In 1958 the regiment was reformed as a training unit, which was reduced to a battalion sized unit in 1974. In 1991 the 89th Infantry Battalion "Salerno" was disbanded.

== History ==
=== Formation ===
On 1 November 1884 the 89th Infantry Regiment (Brigade "Salerno") was formed in Bologna with companies ceded by the 9th Infantry Regiment (Brigade "Regina"), 11th Infantry Regiment (Brigade "Casale"), 39th Infantry Regiment (Brigade "Bologna"), 49th Infantry Regiment (Brigade "Parma"), and 71st Infantry Regiment (Brigade "Puglie"). On the same day the 90th Infantry Regiment (Brigade "Salerno") was formed in Bologna with companies ceded by the 10th Infantry Regiment (Brigade "Regina"), 12th Infantry Regiment (Brigade "Casale"), 40th Infantry Regiment (Brigade "Bologna"), 50th Infantry Regiment (Brigade "Parma"), and 72nd Infantry Regiment (Brigade "Puglie"). Both regiments consisted of a staff and three battalions, with four companies per battalion. Together the two regiments formed the Brigade "Salerno". Basilicata

In 1887 the regiment's 4th Company participated in the Italo-Ethiopian War of 1887–1889. In 1895–96 the regiment provided eight officers and 275 enlisted for units deployed to Italian Eritrea for the First Italo-Ethiopian War.

=== Italo-Turkish War ===
In 1911 the regiment was deployed to Libya for the Italo-Turkish War. On 27 February 1912 the regiment captured the heights of El-Mergèb near Zliten and on 5–6 March defended them against Turkish counterattacks, for which the regiment was awarded its first Silver Medal of Military Valor. Later that year the regiment participated in the conquest of the area of Al-Khums.

=== World War I ===
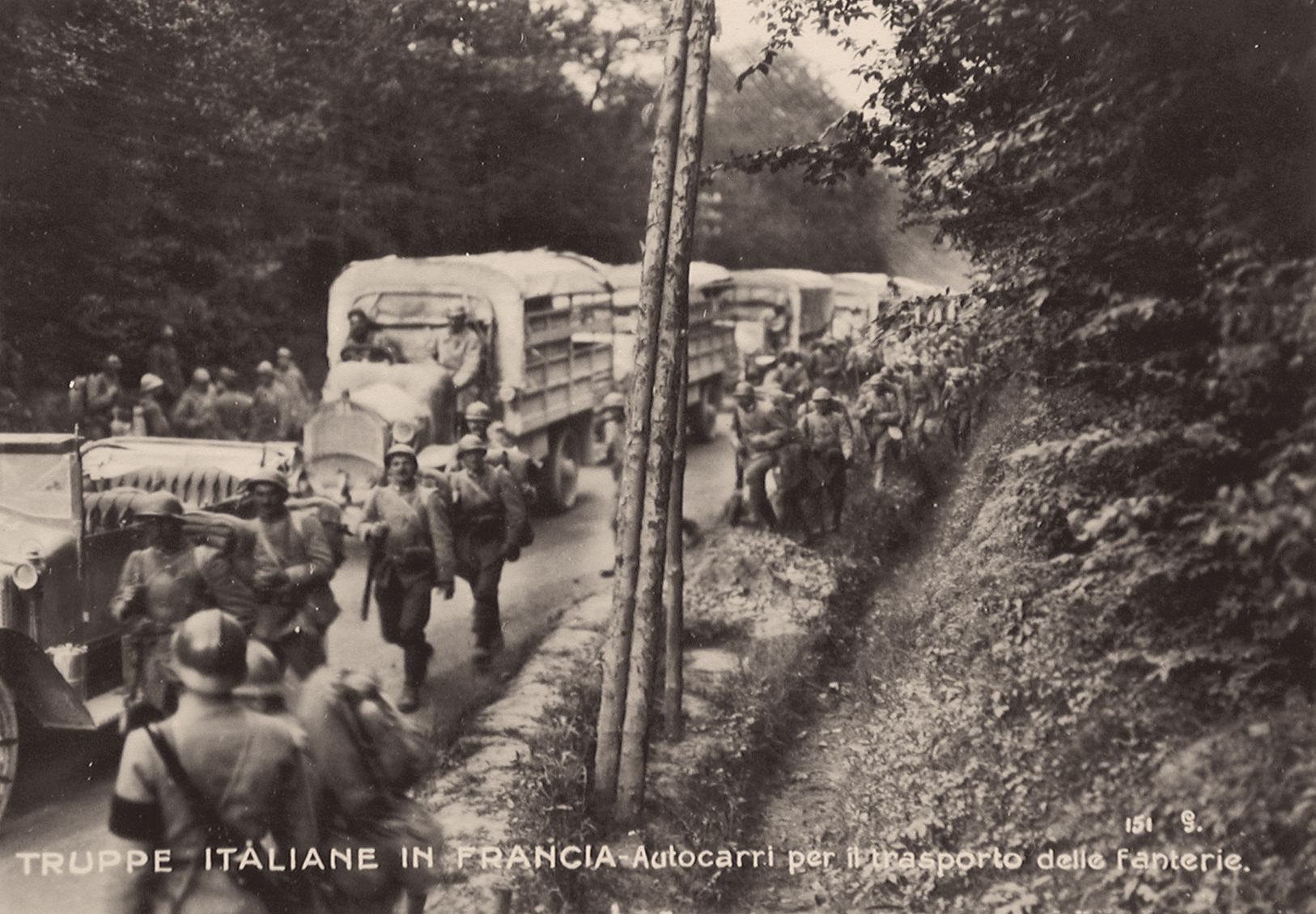
Italian II Army Corps infantry in France in 1918

At the outbreak of World War I, the Brigade "Salerno" formed, together with the Brigade "Modena" and the 28th Field Artillery Regiment, the 8th Division. At the time the 89th Infantry Regiment consisted of three battalions, each of which fielded four fusilier companies and one machine gun section. On 26 March 1915 the regimental depot of the 89th Infantry Regiment in Genoa formed the 156th Infantry Regiment (Brigade "Alessandria"). After Italy's entry into the war on 23 May 1915 the Brigade "Salerno" was deployed to the Italian front: in 1915 the regiment operated against Austro-Hungarian forces on Monte Mrzli. In May 1916 the regiment fought in the Battle of Asiago in the area of Val Marcai, where the regiment earned a Silver Medal of Military Valor for its defense of the Italian positions. In June of the same year the regiment fought for control of Monte Interrotto. In September 1916 the brigade was on the Karst plateau, where it fought in the Seventh Battle of the Isonzo and the Eighth Battle of the Isonzo in the area of Nova Vas.

On 15 February 1917 the depot of the 89th Infantry Regiment formed the 260th Infantry Regiment, which on the following 26 February was assigned to the newly formed Brigade "Murge". The battalions for the two new regiments of the Brigade "Murge" were drawn from six existing brigades (Brigade "Acqui", Brigade "Bergamo", Brigade "Toscana", Brigade "Salerno", Brigade "Barletta", and Brigade "Catanzaro"), whose regiments each ceded two companies. In May 1917 the brigade fought in the Tenth Battle of the Isonzo at Hudi Log and in August of the same year in the Eleventh Battle of the Isonzo on the slopes of Monte Ermada. In October 1917 the brigade was deployed on Monte Matajur when the Battle of Caporetto began. On 26 October the Salerno was attacked on its flank by the Imperial German Army's 12th Division and forced to retreat with heavy losses. The 89th retreated from Matajur with 20 officers and 387 enlisted out of more than 3,000 troops the regiment had at the start of the battle, while the 90th Infantry Regiment retreated with eight officers and about 400 enlisted. During the following retreat to the Piave (river the two regiments lost almost all their remaining personnel.

After Caporetto the brigade was rebuilt and in April 1918 assigned to the II Army Corps, which was deployed to the Western Front in France. There the brigade fought in July in the Second Battle of the Marne at Courmas and in the Bois de Vrigny. The brigade was then deployed at Chemin des Dames and in fall of 1918 it participated in the Hundred Days Offensive in the area of Sissonne. For their conduct in France the two regiments of the Brigade "Salerno" were both awarded a Silver Medal of Military Valor and the 89th Infantry Regiment was honored by the French with a Croix de guerre avec Palme de bronze.

=== Interwar years ===
On 1 October 1926 the 90th Infantry Regiment, now renamed 90th Infantry Regiment "Salerno", was assigned to the I Infantry Brigade. On 1 November 1926 the command of the Brigade "Salerno" was disbanded and on 10 November the 89th Infantry Regiment, now renamed 89th Infantry Regiment "Salerno", was assigned to the V Infantry Brigade, which was the infantry component of the 5th Territorial Division of Genoa. At the same time the 89th Infantry Regiment "Salerno" received one battalion from the disbanded 158th Infantry Regiment "Liguria".

On 20 October 1929, the command of the division moved from Genoa to Imperia and was consequently renamed 5th Territorial Division of Imperia. In 1930 the 89th Infantry Regiment "Salerno" moved from Genoa to Ventimiglia. On 1 January 1935, the 5th Territorial Division of Imperia changed its name to 5th Infantry Division "Cosseria". A name change that also extended to the division's infantry brigade. From August 1935 to September 1936, the regiment was assigned to the 105th Infantry Division "Cosseria II", which had been formed as temporary replacement, while the 5th Infantry Division "Cosseria" was deployed to Ethiopia for the Second Italo-Ethiopian War. During this time the regiment provided 38 officers and 185 enlisted for units deployed for the war.

On 25 March 1939 the "Cosseria" division received the 90th Infantry Regiment "Salerno" from the 1st Infantry Division "Superga". On the same date the two infantry regiments "Salerno" were renamed 89th Infantry Regiment "Cosseria", respectively 90th Infantry Regiment "Cosseria".

=== World War II ===
At the outbreak of World War II the regiment consisted of a command, a command company, three fusilier battalions, a support weapons battery equipped with 65/17 infantry support guns, and a mortar company equipped with 81mm Mod. 35 mortars. In June 1940 the division participated in the invasion of France in the area of Menton. For its conduct in this campaign the 89th Infantry Regiment "Cosseria" was awarded a War Cross of Military Valor, which was affixed to the regiment's flag and is depicted on the regiment's coat of arms.

In 1942 the division was assigned to the Italian Army in Russia/8th Army and left Liguria in June 1942. In Ukraine the division was initially stationed at Horlivka. In the first half of August the division moved to the front on the Don river. After arriving at the Don the division clashed with Soviet forces and the regiment's III Battalion was awarded a War Cross of Military Valor for having beaten back a Soviet attack in 11–12 September 1942. This war cross of Military Valor was affixed to the regiment's flag too and is also depicted on the regiment's coat of arms. In December 1942 the Soviet launched Operation Little Saturn, during which the Cosseria division was overrun by Soviet forces. For their sacrifice on the Don river the 89th Infantry Regiment "Cosseria" and 90th Infantry Regiment "Cosseria" were both awarded a Gold Medal of Military Valor.

In May 1943 the survivors of the division returned to Italy, where the division was rebuilt. At the end of July 1943 the Cosseria division was sent to Lombardy, where the division was disbanded by invading German forces after the announcement of the Armistice of Cassibile on 8 September 1943.

=== Cold War ===
On 1 July 1958, the 89th Infantry Regiment "Salerno" was reformed by renaming the existing 5th Recruits Training Center in Imperia. The regiment consisted of a command, a command company, and three battalions based in Imperia, Diano Castello, and Albenga. On 21 July 1964 the regiment received a battalion in Savona from the 52nd Infantry Regiment "Alpi" and integrated it as IV Battalion. Afterwards the regiment consisted of the following units:

- 89th Infantry Regiment "Salerno", in Imperia
  - Command and Services Company, in Imperia
  - I Battalion, in Imperia
  - II Battalion, in Diano Castello
  - III Battalion, in Albenga
  - IV Battalion, in Savona

On 31 October 1974 the 89th Infantry Regiment "Salerno" and its battalions in Imperia and Diano Castello were disbanded. The next day, on 1 November 1974, the regiment's III Battalion in Albenga was renamed I Recruits Training Battalion "Salerno", while the regiment's IV Battalion in Savona was renamed II Recruits Training Battalion "Salerno". Both battalions consisted of a command, a command platoon, and three recruits companies. The traditions of the 89th Infantry Regiment "Salerno" were assigned to the I Recruits Training Battalion "Salerno", which also received the regiment's flag for safekeeping.

On 31 July 1975 the I Recruits Training Battalion "Salerno" in Albenga was disbanded and its three recruit companies became a detachment of the II Recruits Training Battalion "Salerno". The next day, on 1 August 1975, the II Recruits Training Battalion "Salerno" was assigned to the Armored Division "Ariete", as the division's recruits training battalion.

During the 1975 army reform the army disbanded the regimental level and newly independent battalions were granted for the first time their own flags. On 1 November 1975 the Armored Troops Recruits Training Battalion in Salerno was renamed 89th Infantry Battalion "Salerno" and assigned the flag and traditions of the 89th Infantry Regiment "Salerno". The battalion consisted of a command, a command platoon, and four recruits companies.

On 15 November 1975 the II Recruits Training Battalion "Salerno" in Savona was renamed 16th Infantry Battalion "Savona". On 15 April 1977 the battalion's detachment in Albenga became an autonomous unit and was renamed 14th Bersaglieri Battalion "Sernaglia".

In 1987 the command platoon was expanded to command and services company. On 31 January 1991 the 89th Infantry Battalion "Salerno" was disbanded after the battalion had transferred the flag of the 89th Infantry Regiment "Salerno" to the Shrine of the Flags in the Vittoriano in Rome on 15 January.
