= Obice da 75/18 modello 34 =

Obice da 75/14 modello 34
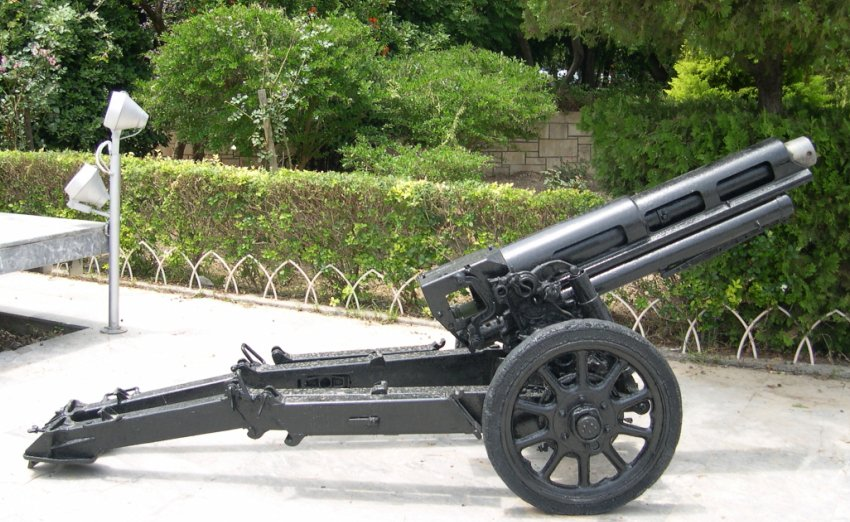
- Type: Howitzer
- Place of origin: Italy

Service history
- In service: 1934–1945
- Used by: Italy; Portugal
- Wars: World War II; Portuguese Colonial War

Production history
- Designer: Sergio Belese
- Manufacturer: Ansaldo
- No. built: Approx 600

Specifications
- Mass: Mod.34: 1,065 kg (2,348 lb) Travel; 780 kg (1,720 lb) Combat Mod.35: 1,832 kg (4,039 lb) Travel; 1,050 kg (2,310 lb) Combat
- Barrel length: 1.557 m (5 ft 1.3 in) L/20.75
- Shell: 75 x 232.5mmR
- Shell weight: 6.4 kg (14 lb 2 oz)
- Caliber: 75 mm (2.95 in)
- Carriage: Box trail (Modello 34); Split trail (Modello 35)
- Elevation: -10° to +45°
- Traverse: 50°
- Muzzle velocity: 425 m/s (1,395 ft/s)
- Maximum firing range: 9,564 m (10,459 yd)

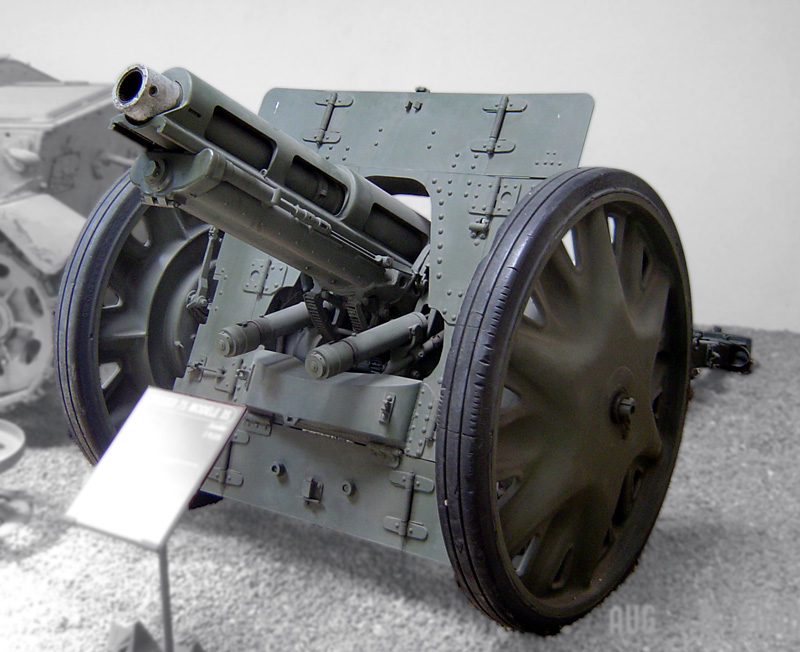
Obice de 75/18 modello 35 on display at the Musée des Blindés in Saumur

The Obice da 75/18 modello 34 was an Italian artillery piece used during World War II.

== History ==
The Italian army has always had an interest in mountain artillery due to the mountainous terrain of its borders. By the 1930s much of this artillery was obsolescent and overdue for replacement.

In 1934, the Italian firm of Ansaldo produced a new mountain howitzer design, the Obice da 75/18 modello 34, designed by Lt. Colonel Sergio Berlese who served in the Italian artillery. The modello 34 could be broken down into eight loads for transport. In the interest of standardization and logistics a version of the 75/18, the modello 35, was also used as the light howitzer component of normal field batteries. The modello 35 did not break down into smaller loads and had a split, rather than box, trail.

The Modello 34 first saw action in the Spanish Civil War, and later was used in Greece, Yugoslavia, and France. The Modello 35 was mostly used on the Russian Front and in Italy. Weapons captured by Germany were given the designation 7.5 cm GeBH-254(i) (for the Modello 34) and 7.5 cm FH-255(i) (for the Modello 35). The guns were also used by the Republic of Servia.

The Italians sold the modello 35 abroad in order to obtain foreign currency. In 1940 a sizable batch was sold to Portugal, and more went to South American countries in exchange for raw materials.

The Modello 34 was used as the main armament of the Semovente 75/18 self-propelled gun where, due to its "Effetto Pronto" (HEAT) ammunition, it also had an adequate anti-tank capability.

In 1941 some captured pieces were used against the Germans by the forces of the Commonwealth during the Battle of Crete and were probably present in the defence of Maleme airfield. Two of them are currently displayed next to the Battle of Crete monument in Heraklion.

== See also ==
- Cannone da 75/32 modello 37
