= Cannone da 75/27 modello 06 =

Italian field gun during World War I and World War II

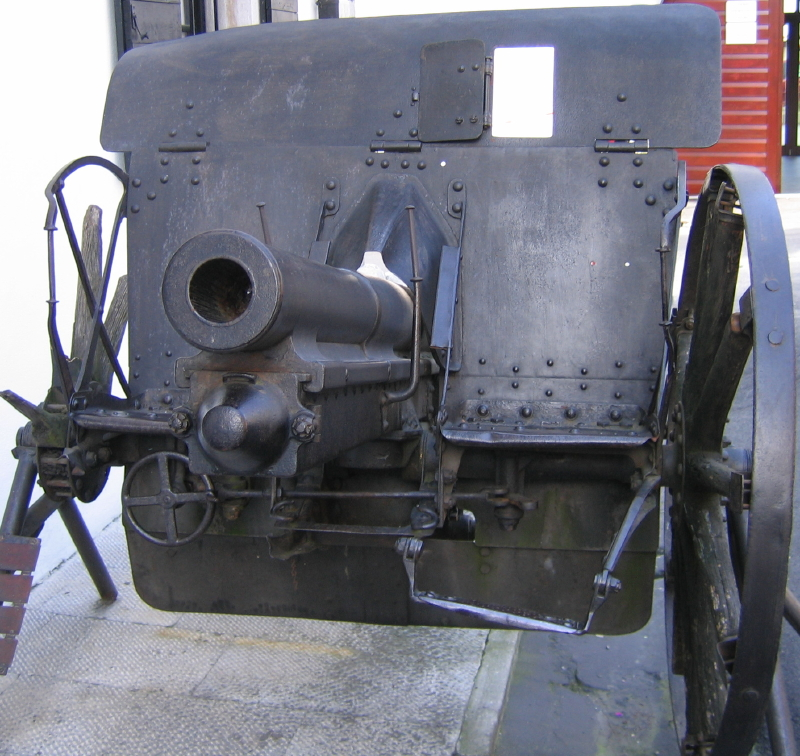
- Front view of a battered Cannone da 75/27 modello 06 at Museum of World War I, Kobarid (Caporetto), Slovenia
- Type: Field gun
- Place of origin: German Empire

Service history
- In service: 1906?–1945
- Used by: Italy; Nazi Germany
- Wars: World War I World War II

Production history
- Designer: Krupp
- No. built: 2000+
- Variants: Cannone da 75/27 modello 12

Specifications
- Mass: 1,080 kg (2,380 lb)
- Barrel length: 2.25 m (7 ft 5 in) L/30
- Shell: Fixed QF 75 x 185mm R
- Shell weight: 6.3 kg (14 lb)
- Caliber: 75 mm (2.95 in)
- Breech: horizontal sliding-block
- Recoil: hydro spring
- Carriage: Pole trail
- Elevation: -10° to +16°
- Traverse: 7°
- Rate of fire: 4-6 rpm
- Muzzle velocity: 502 m/s (1,647 ft/s)
- Maximum firing range: Horizontal: 6.8 km (4.2 mi); Vertical: 4 km (13,000 ft)

The Cannone da 75/27 modello 06 was a field gun used by Italy during World War I and World War II. It was a license-built copy of the Krupp Kanone M 1906 gun. It had seats for two crewmen attached to the gunshield as was common practice for the period. Captured weapons were designated by the Wehrmacht during World War II as the 7.5 cm Feldkanone 237(i).

== Variants ==
Special fortress versions were produced as the Cannone da 75/27 modello 06 in Casmatta and Caverna. These had different carriages suitable for static use.

The Cannone da 75/27 C.K. was mounted on a high-angle pedestal mount for anti-aircraft use was produced, and these were assigned to coastal defense and second line units during World War II.

In 1915, the anti-aircraft version formed the basis of Italy's first truck mounted artillery, called the Autocannone da 75/27 C.K. . Eventually, twenty-seven batteries of five guns were formed during World War I.

Between the wars, many guns were modernized for tractor-towing with pressed-steel wheels and rubber rims. These weighed some 65 kg (143 lb) more than the original version with spoked wooden wheels. The modernized guns went on to serve in World War II.

The Cannone da 75/27 modello 12 was a modello 06 modified for greater elevation (-12° to +18° 30') and lighter weight (only 900 kg (2,000 lb)). Only small numbers were produced for the cavalry divisions of the Royal Italian Army. The Germans designated captured guns as the 7.5 cm Feldkanone 245(i).

The Bundeswehr Museum of German Defense Technology in Koblenz has one of these cannons in its collection.

== Bibliography ==
- Chamberlain, Peter & Gander, Terry. Light and Medium Field Artillery. New York: Arco, 1975
- Gander, Terry and Chamberlain, Peter. Weapons of the Third Reich: An Encyclopedic Survey of All Small Arms, Artillery and Special Weapons of the German Land Forces 1939-1945. New York: Doubleday, 1979 ISBN 0-385-15090-3
