= Coturri =

Coturri is a surname. Notable people with the surname include:

- Phil Coturri, American viticulturalist
- Renato Coturri (1883–1951), Italian general
