= Paolo Angioy =

Italian general and spy

- Born: 7 April 1890; Alghero, Kingdom of Italy
- Died: 2 September 1975 (aged 85); Rome, Italy
- Military career
- Allegiance: Kingdom of Italy
- Branch: Royal Italian Army; Italian Army
- Rank: Lieutenant General
- Commands: 52nd Infantry Regiment "Alpi"; 57th Infantry Regiment "Liguria"; 59th Infantry Division "Cagliari"
- Conflicts: World War I; Battles of the Isonzo; Battle of Monte Grappa; Second Italo-Ethiopian War; Spanish Civil War; Battle of Guadalajara; World War II; Greco-Italian War; Operation Achse
- Awards: Silver Medal of Military Valor (four times); Military Order of Savoy

Paolo Angioy (7 April 1890 – 2 September 1975) was an Italian general during World War II and head of the Servizio Informazioni Militare in 1936-1937.

== Biography ==
He fought during the First World War with the rank of captain and from 1916 major, earning three Silver Medals of Military Valor for capturing Austro-Hungarian positions during the Tenth and Eleventh Battle of the Isonzo and for repelling enemy attacks during the First Battle of Monte Grappa, and being severely wounded in action.

After attending the Army War School in 1919-1920, he joined the Servizio Informazioni Militare (SIM), the intelligence service of the Royal Italian Army, being promoted to colonel in July 1935 and carrying out intelligence tasks during the Second Italo-Ethiopian War and the Spanish Civil War (where he was awarded a fourth Silver Medal for his behaviour during the battle of Guadalajara, where he acted as deputy commander of an infantry division) and becoming deputy head of the SIM under Mario Roatta, and acting head from October 1936 to June 1937, while Roatta was in Spain as commander of the Corpo Truppe Volontarie. He was allegedly involved in the planning of the assassination of Carlo and Nello Rosselli, and shortly thereafter left the SIM, being replaced by Colonel Donato Tripiccione.

From 1937 to 1939 he commanded the 52nd Infantry Regiment "Alpi", then the 157th Infantry Regiment "Liguria". He was then placed at the disposal of the General Staff with special assignments, working with the Territorial Defence Command of Rome and to the VII Corps. After promotion to brigadier general in October 1940, from 13 March 1941 to 8 September 1943 he was commander of the 59th Infantry Division "Cagliari", fighting in Albania during the Greco-Italian War (on the Vjose front, where he was awarded the title of officer of the Military Order of Savoy) and then in Greece for occupation duties, as Superior Commander of the Peloponnese, being promoted to major general in July 1942.

After the armistice of Cassibile he was arrested by the Germans on 18 September 1943 and interned in Oflag 64/Z in Schokken, Poland. He refused to cooperate with the Italian Social Republic, and along with the other prisoners he was freed in 1945 by the advancing Red Army. The generals were then transferred near Kharkiv, Ukraine, from which they were repatriated after the war was over. Upon repatriation, Angioy learned that on 12 March 1945 he had been sentenced to a long prison term as the instigator of the murder of the Rosselli brothers; however, following a review of the trial, he was acquitted with full formula in 1949 and readmitted into the military career, which he ended with the rank of lieutenant general. He died in Rome in 1975.
