= Emilio Faldella =

Military General

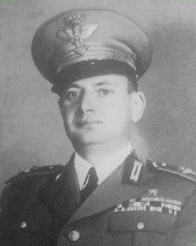
- Born: 5 March 1897; Maggiora, Kingdom of Italy
- Died: 9 September 1975 (aged 78); Turin, Italy
- Military career
- Allegiance: Kingdom of Italy
- Branch: Royal Italian Army
- Service years: 1914–1946
- Rank: Lieutenant General
- Commands: "Dronero" Alpini Battalion; Tank-Artillery Group; 5th Legionary Infantry Regiment; 3rd Alpini Regiment; Milan Military Area
- Conflicts: World War I; Battles of the Isonzo; Battle of Asiago; Battle of the Piave river; Battle of Vittorio Veneto; Second Italo-Ethiopian War; Spanish Civil War; Battle of Madrid; Battle of Malaga; Battle of Guadalajara; Battle of Bilbao; Battle of Santander; World War II; Battle of the Western Alps; Allied invasion of Sicily
- Awards: Silver Medal of Military Valor; Military Order of Savoy; Order of Saints Maurice and Lazarus; Colonial Order of the Star of Italy

Emilio Faldella (5 March 1897 in Maggiora – 9 September 1975 in Turin) was an Italian general, secret agent, and military historian.

== Biography ==
Faldella was born in Maggiora, province of Novara, in 1897, into an ancient family hailing from Monferrato. In 1914 he entered the Military Academy of Modena and in May 1915 he was appointed second lieutenant and assigned to the 3rd Alpini Regiment. Between 1915 and 1916 he fought on Krn, Vodil, Kukla and Mrzli in the Julian Alps, near Tolmin and Bovec and later in the battle of Asiago. In October 1916 he was awarded a Silver Medal of Military Valor for an action on Monte Biserto; he later fought on the Pasubio massif and in the Vallarsa. From July 1917 he followed General Guido Liuzzi (in charge of the logistics of the Fourth Army) throughout his commands. He participated in the battles of the Piave and Vittorio Veneto as aide of the commander of the 1st Alpini Group.

After the war he attended the Army War School and was transferred to the general staff with the rank of captain. In 1928 he was promoted to major and appointed commander of the "Dronero" Battalion of the 2nd Alpini Regiment. In June 1930 he was assigned to the Servizio Informazioni Militare, for which he operated in Spain from July 1930 to June 1935, with the cover of Italian consul in Barcelona. In January 1935 he was promoted to lieutenant colonel, and from July 1935 to August 1936, during the Second Italo-Ethiopian War, he was head of the special SIM section for East Africa (AO), infiltrating Palestinian agent Jacir Bey in Negus Hailé Selassié's entourage. Jacir Bey also offered to persuade the Emperor to reach a peace agreement with Italy, effectively turning Ethiopia into an Italian protectorate; the plan never materialized, however, and Jacir Bey, who had nonetheless demanded a hefty payment for his services, was later assassinated by the SIM in the Netherlands after trying to blackmailing the Italian government by threatening to publish all documents pertaining to the affair.

With the beginning of the Spanish Civil War, from 28 August 1936 Faldella was sent to the headquarters of Generalissimo Francisco Franco as "observer" and liaison officer. He then assumed command of the "Tank-Artillery Group" of the Corpo Truppe Volontarie (two tank companies and six truck-mounted artillery batteries) during the first battle of Madrid (October–November 1936). From December 1936, after the arrival of massive Italian military aid in Spain, he was appointed chief of staff of the CTV; in the absence of its commander Mario Roatta, who was in Italy at the time, he prepared the battle for the conquest of Malaga. In February 1937 Faldella replaced Roatta again, after the latter had been wounded in the fighting in Malaga, until the conquest of the city. After the battle of Guadalajara, Roatta was replaced by general Ettore Bastico, and Faldella by colonel Gastone Gambara. Faldella then assumed command of the 5th Regiment of legionary infantry, participating in the conquest of Bilbao and the battle of Santander (June–August 1937), for which he was awarded the knight's cross of the Military Order of Savoy.

In December 1937 he finished his term at the SIM and was transferred to the Training Office of the Army General Staff. In 1939 he was promoted to colonel and became commander of the 3rd Alpini Regiment, which he led during the battle of the Western Alps in June 1940. From August 1941 to May 1943 he was in command of the Training Office of the General Staff.

He was later appointed chief of staff of the 6th Army and of the Armed Forces of Sicily, under the command of General Alfredo Guzzoni. On 1 July 1943, nine days before the beginning of the Allied invasion, he was promoted to Brigadier General; in August, at the end of the campaign, he retreated to mainland Italy along with Guzzoni and the remnants of the Sixth Army, which was finally dissolved following the Armistice of Cassibile on 8 September 1943.

After the armistice, by order of General Antonio Sorice, Minister of War, Faldella returned to intelligence activities, ostensibly joining the Italian Social Republic, where he was appointed General Intendant of the armed forces, but secretly working for the royalist Italian government in the south, taking command of a vast and efficient clandestine network operating in the Julian March. He was betrayed and arrested on 16 May 1944, but was released thanks to the intervention of Marshal Rodolfo Graziani, living in the following months in Milan in a semi-clandestine situation. On 26 April 1945, by order of Raffaele Cadorna Jr., he was appointed military commander of Milan.

He retired from active service on January 22, 1946, and subsequently devoted himself to social activities and to the study of military disciplines, with particular regard to training; he wrote over twenty military history books. On 27 March 1951 he was promoted to Major General and on 20 October 1969 to Lieutenant General. He died in Turin in 1975.
