= Antonio Scuero =

Italian politician

- Born: 29 November 1885; Carrù, Kingdom of Italy
- Died: 25 July 1960 (aged 74); Montechiaro d'Asti, Italy
- Military career
- Allegiance: Kingdom of Italy
- Branch: Royal Italian Army
- Rank: Lieutenant General
- Commands: 12th Infantry Regiment "Monviso" Infantry Brigade; 59th Infantry Division Cagliari; Fifth Army Corps
- Conflicts: Italo-Turkish War; World War I; Battles of the Isonzo; Battle of Mount Ortigara; Pacification of Libya; Second Italo-Ethiopian War; First Battle of Tembien; Second Battle of Tembien; Battle of Lake Ashenge; World War II; Battle of the Western Alps; Greco-Italian War; Axis invasion of Yugoslavia; Operation Achse
- Awards: Silver Medal of Military Valour; Bronze Medal of Military Valour; War Cross of Military Valor; Military Order of Savoy; Order of the Crown of Italy

Antonio Scuero (29 November 1885 – 25 July 1960) was an Italian general during World War II.

== Biography ==
He was born in Carrù, province of Cuneo, on November 29, 1885, and after attending the Royal Military Academy of Modena, graduating on September 5, 1907 with the rank of second lieutenant, he participated in the Italo-Turkish War in 1911-1912. After Italy's entry into World War I, on May 24, 1915, he was assigned to the Alpini corps and fought on the Isonzo front, after which he became a staff officer. He was promoted to major in 1917 and by the end of the war he was decorated with a Bronze Medal of Military Valor (during the battle of Mount Ortigara), a War Cross for Military Valor and the title of Knight of the Order of the Crown of Italy.

In 1921 he was sent to Eritrea, assigned to the 10th Battalion of the local Royal Corps of Colonial Troops, and was later transferred to the RCTC of Libya, where he participated in counter-guerrilla operations and was awarded a Silver Medal of Military Valor in 1924 and promoted to lieutenant colonel in 1926. Between August 1928 and October 1931, when he was promoted to colonel, he held the position of Chief of Staff of the Territorial Division of Novara, then assuming command of the 12th Infantry Regiment which he maintained until 1934, when he was appointed Chief of Staff of the Bologna Army Corps.

After the outbreak of the war with Ethiopia he took part in military operations as Chief of Staff of the Eritrean Army Corps, being awarded the Knight's Cross of the Military Order of Savoy for his contribution to the conquest of Ethiopia. He was promoted to brigadier general on 1 July 1937 and given command of the "Monviso" Infantry Brigade, with headquarters in Cuneo. After having held the position of quartermaster-general of the 4th Army in 1938, in March 1940 he assumed command of the 59th Infantry Division Cagliari.

After Italy entered World War II on 10 June 1940, he participated in the brief offensive against France; he personally led a flanking maneuver that resulted in the capture of Fort de la Balme, La Planay and Bramans, and at the end of the campaign he was awarded the title of Officer of the Military Order of Savoy. In July 1940 he was promoted to Major General, being appointed Quartermaster-General of the Armed Forces Command of Albania in December. In this capacity he participated in the Greco-Italian War and in the invasion of Yugoslavia; on 4 December 1940, when Chief of the General Staff Ugo Cavallero flew to Albania during the Greek counteroffensive that threatened Vlore, Scuero informed him of the disastrous situation of the supply depots of his Intendancy. From 24 May 1941 to 13 February 1943 he held the position of Undersecretary of the Ministry of War (the titular minister being Benito Mussolini, thus becoming a member of the Chamber of Fasces and Corporations; on 4 October 1942 he was promoted to Lieutenant General. After leaving his office at the Ministry, on 13 May 1943 he assumed command of the 5th Army Corps in Croatia, with headquarters in Crikvenica.

Following the proclamation of the armistice of Cassibile on 8 September 1943, Scuero entered into negotiations with Yugoslav partisan leaders Jovo Lončarević and Ivan Barbačić-Ivić in order to organize an orderly withdrawal of the Italian troops. He was however faced with an ultimatum to either join the partisans and fight the Germans or to surrender all weapons to the partisans and evacuate the region; in the night between 9 and 10 September he left Crikvenica with the staff of the Fifth Corps and moved to Fiume, sparking chaos among the remaining Italian forces in the city, after which he was captured by German troops and interned in a prisoner-of-war camp in Germany. In January 1944 he was referred to the special tribunal of the Italian Social Republic and sentenced to a prison term, but remained in captivity in Germany, returning to Italy in 1945. After the end of the war he left retired to private life in Montechiaro d'Asti, where he died in 1960.
