= 59th Infantry Division "Cagliari" =

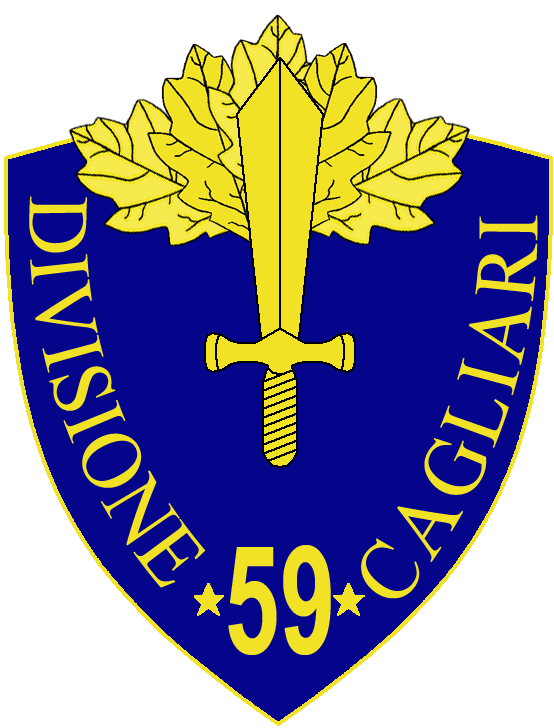
- 59th Infantry Division "Cagliari" insignia
- Active: 1939–1943
- Country: Kingdom of Italy
- Branch: Royal Italian Army
- Type: Infantry
- Size: Division
- Garrison/HQ: Vercelli
- Engagements: World War II; Italian invasion of France; Greco-Italian War

Commanders
- Notable commanders: General Antonio Scuero

Insignia
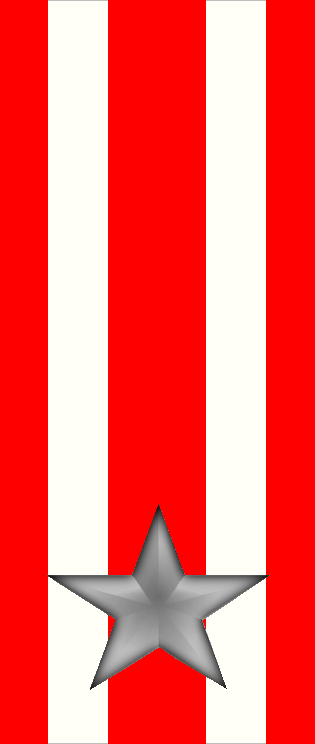
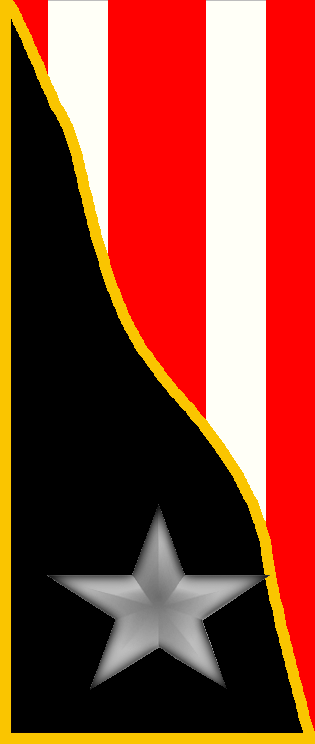
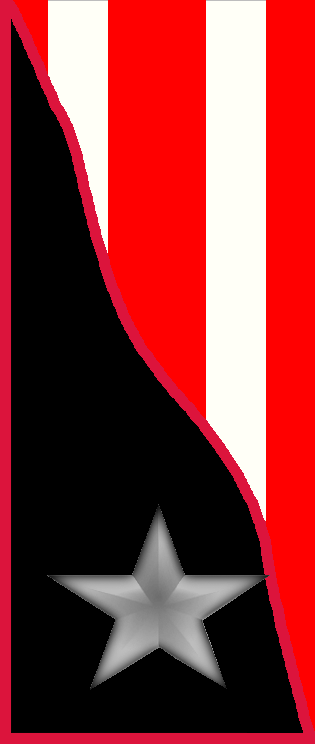
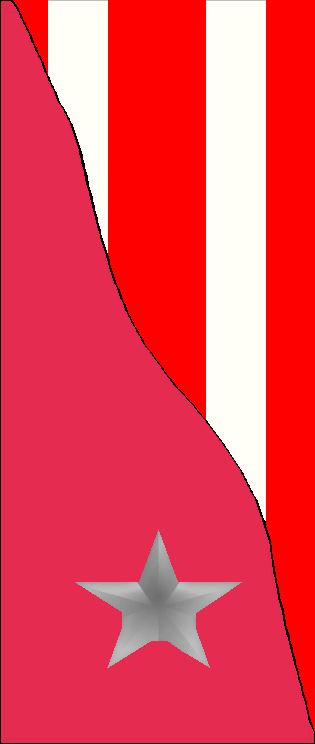
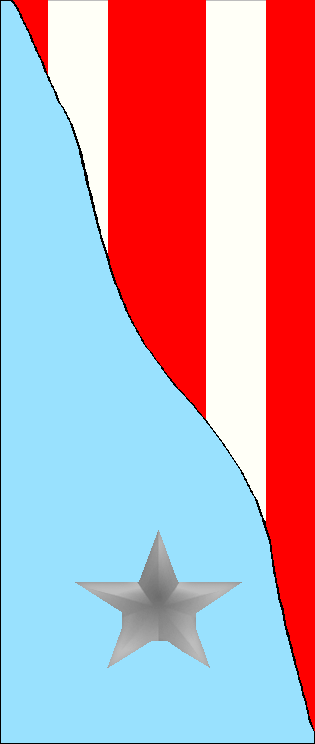
- Identification symbol: Cagliari Division gorget patches

The 59th Infantry Division "Cagliari" (Italian: 59ª Divisione di fanteria "Cagliari") was a infantry division of the Royal Italian Army during World War II. The Cagliari was a mountain-type infantry division, which meant that the division's artillery and logistics were moved by pack mules, while in standard infantry divisions artillery and logistics were moved by horse-drawn limbers and carriages. Italy's real mountain warfare divisions were the six alpine divisions manned by Alpini troops.

The division was formed on 5 April 1939 in Vercelli and named for the city of Cagliari. Garrisoned in Vercelli, the division was made up almost entirely of men from northern Piedmont, especially from the cities of Vercelli and Ivrea. The division participated in the Greco-Italian War in 1940-41 and was then sent to the Peloponnese in Greece as garrison unit. There the division was disbanded by invading German forces after the Armistice of Cassibile between Italy and the Allies was announced on 8 September 1943.

== History ==
The division's lineage begins with the Brigade "Cagliari" established in Turin on 1 August 1862 with the 63rd and 64th infantry regiments.

=== World War I ===
The brigade fought on the Italian front in World War I. On 30 September 1926 the brigade command and 64th Infantry Regiment "Cagliari" were disbanded, while the 63rd Infantry Regiment "Cagliari" was assigned to the XXVI Infantry Brigade. On 5 April 1939 the 64th Infantry Regiment "Cagliari" was reactivated in Ivrea. On the same date the 59th Infantry Division "Cagliari" was activated in Vercelli and was assigned its two namesake infantry regiments and on 1 September 1939 the 59th Artillery Regiment "Cagliari" was reformed by the 17th Artillery Regiment "Sforzesca" in Novara and assigned to the division.

=== World War II ===
==== Invasion of France ====
In June 1940 the Cagliari was assigned to I Army Corps and participated in the Italian invasion of France. On 10 June 1940 the division was stationed on the French-Italian border on the Mont Cenis-Monte Niblè-Rocciamelone line. On 15 June the division crossed the border and captured Dents d'Ambin, Sommet de la Nunda, Pas de la Beccia and Col de Sollières around Mont Cenis lake by 17 June 1940. On 21 June 1940 the Cagliari reached the Arc river valley and started advancing to Bramans and Le Planey (on Ruisseau d'Étache stream), capturing both on 23 June 1940. Immediately an attack was initiated towards the Val d'Ambin with the aim to take Modane, but the Franco-Italian Armistice signed 24 June 1940 ended hostilities the next day. The division remained in the Arc valley until the end of September, when it returned home to Italy.

==== Greco-Italian War ====
On 21 January 1941 the division was ordered to move to Albania to reinforce the Italian front in the ongoing Greco-Italian War. On 31 January 1941 the Cagliari division arrived in Berat and was assigned to VIII Army Corps. First contact with Greek forces was made on 8 February 1941 near Berat, with clashes at Mali i Tërpanit and Paraspuar following soon. On 12 February 1941 the Italian front had stabilised from Qafa e Bubësit to positions in valleys of Osum and Tomorrica rivers. On 11 March 1941, as part of the Italian Spring Offensive, the Cagliari attacked towards Bubës, capturing it on 13 March 1941. The division's assaults of Monastery Hill a few kilometers south on 14–19 March 1941 were unsuccessful.

As a result of Greek units disengaging after the start of the German invasion of Greece on 6 April 1941, the Cagliari advanced to the ridge overlooking the Këlcyrë Gorge on 15 April 1941, overcoming some Greek rearguard resistance. On 18 April 1941 the division continued the pursuit to Përmet and reached the pre-war border stream of Perati on 20 April 1941, where Greek rearguards once more tried to make a stand. After the Greek surrender the Cagliari was used as occupation force in Kalpaki. In June 1941, the division was transferred to the southern Peloponnese, where garrisons were established in Tripoli, Kalamata and Sparta. The division undertook anti-partisan duties and coastal defence duties until September 1943. After the announcement of the Armistice of Cassibile on 8 September 1943 the Cagliari was disbanded by the German 117. Jäger-Division.

== Organization ==
59th Infantry Division "Cagliari" organization in 1940

- 59th Infantry Division "Cagliari", in Vercelli
  - Headquarters
    - Command Company
    - 6th Carabinieri Section
    - 234th Carabinieri Section
    - 29th Field Post Office
    - 59th Infantry Division Command Transport Squad
  - 63rd Infantry Regiment "Cagliari", in Vercelli
    - Command Company
    - 3 × Fusilier battalions
    - Support Weapons Battery (65/17 mod. 13 infantry support guns)
    - Mortar Company (81mm mod. 35 mortars)
  - 64th Infantry Regiment "Cagliari", in Ivrea
    - Command Company
    - 3 × Fusilier battalions
    - Support Weapons Battery (65/17 mod. 13 infantry support guns)
    - Mortar Company (81mm mod. 35 mortars)
  - 363rd Infantry Regiment "Cagliari" (raised on 1 November 1941 by the depot of the 63rd Infantry Regiment "Cagliari")
    - Command Company
    - 3 × Fusilier battalions
    - Cannons Company (47/32 mod. 35 anti-tank guns)
    - Mortar Company (81mm mod. 35 mortar; disbanded in October 1942)
  - 59th Artillery Regiment "Cagliari", in Casale Monferrato
    - Command Unit
    - I Group (75/27 mod. 11 field guns; transferred on 1 September 1939 from the 5th Artillery Regiment "Superga")
    - II Group (75/27 mod. 11 field guns; transferred on 1 September 1939 from the 25th Artillery Regiment "Assietta"; transferred on 21 January 1941 to the 5th Artillery Regiment "Superga")
    - II Group (75/13 mod. 15 mountain guns; transferred on 21 January 1941 from the 5th Artillery Regiment "Superga")
    - III Group (75/13 mod. 15 mountain guns; formed by the 30th Artillery Regiment "Lupi di Toscana")
    - 359th Anti-aircraft battery (20/65 mod. 35 anti-aircraft guns)
    - Ammunition and Supply Unit
  - LIX Mortar Battalion (81mm mod. 35 mortars)
  - 59th Anti-tank Company (47/32 mod. 35 anti-tank guns)
  - 15th Engineer Company
  - 59th Telegraph and Radio Operators Company
  - 29th Medical Section
  - 59th Supply Section
  - 59th Autocarrette Section
  - 349th Transport Section

Attached to the division in June 1940 for the Italian invasion of France:

- Alpini Battalion "Susa"

Attached to the division from 1941 to early 1942:

- 28th CC.NN. Legion "Randaccio"
  - XI CC.NN. Battalion
  - XXVIII CC.NN. Battalion (remained attached to the division until September 1943)
  - 28th CC.NN. Machine Gun Company

Attached to the division in 1943:

- II Carabinieri Battalion
- III Guardia di Finanza Battalion
- VIII Squadrons Group "Lancieri di Firenze"
- VIII Group (105/28 cannons; formed by the 3rd Army Corps Artillery Regiment)
- XLVII Group (105/32 heavy field guns; formed by the 14th Army Corps Artillery Regiment)
- CXIII Group (149/13 heavy howitzers; formed by the 8th Army Corps Artillery Regiment)
- XCIII Artillery Group
- CLXXXVII Artillery Group
- CLXXXVIII Artillery Group

== Commanding officers ==
The division's commanding officers were:

- Generale di Divisione Ruggero Tracchia (5 April 1939 - 24 May 1940)
- Generale di Brigata Antonio Scuero (25 May 1940 - 15 November 1940)
- Generale di Brigata Giuseppe Gianni (16 November 1940 - 12 March 1941)
- Generale di Divisione Paolo Angioy (13 March 1941 - September 1943)
