= 14th Artillery Regiment "Ferrara" =

Inactive Italian Army artillery unit

- 14° Reggimento Artiglieria "Ferrara"
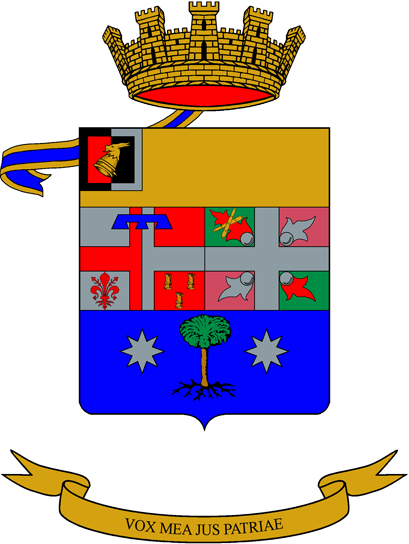
- Regimental coat of arms
- Active: 1 Nov. 1888 – 8 Sept. 1943; 1 Feb. 1949 – 30 June 1991
- Country: Italy
- Branch: Italian Army
- Part of: 5th Army Corps
- Garrison/HQ: Trieste
- Motto: "Vox mea jus Patriae"
- Anniversaries: 15 June 1918 - Second Battle of the Piave River
- Decorations: 1x Gold Medal of Military Valor

Insignia
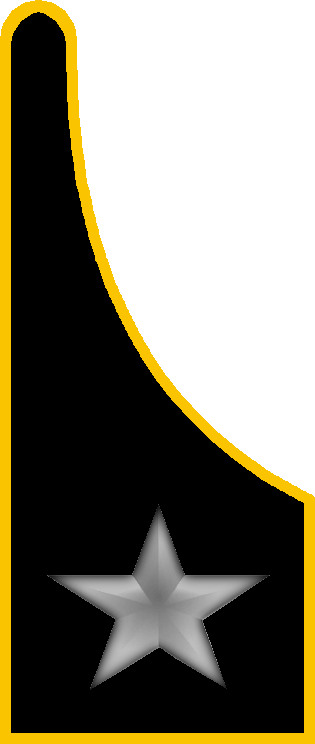
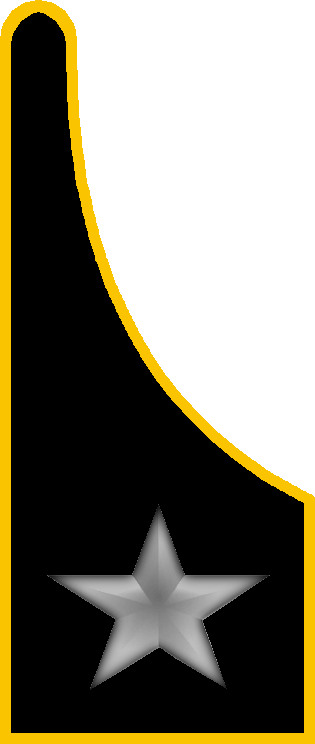
- Regimental gorget patches

The 14th Artillery Regiment "Ferrara" (Italian: 14° Reggimento Artiglieria "Ferrara") is an inactive field artillery regiment of the Italian Army, which was based in Trieste in Friuli-Venezia Giulia. Originally an artillery regiment of the Royal Italian Army, the regiment was formed in 1888 and served in World War I on the Italian front. In 1935 the regiment was assigned to the 23rd Infantry Division "Ferrara", with which the regiment fought in the Greco-Italian War of World War II. The division and regiment were located in Montenegro, when the Armistice of Cassibile was announced on 8 September 1943, and shortly thereafter were disbanded by German forces.

The regiment was reformed in 1949 in Foggia and assigned to the Infantry Division "Pinerolo". In 1962 the regiment moved from Foggia to Trieste and was assigned to the Trieste Troops Command. In 1975 the regiment was reduced to 14th Field Artillery Group "Murge", which in 1986 was assigned to the 5th Army Corps. The group was disbanded in 1991. The regimental anniversary falls, as for all Italian Army artillery regiments, on June 15, the beginning of the Second Battle of the Piave River in 1918.

== History ==
On 1 November 1888 the 14th Field Artillery Regiment was formed in Pesaro. The new regiment consisted of eight batteries and one train company ceded by the 2nd Field Artillery Regiment in Ferrara. The ceded batteries had participated in 1866 in the Third Italian War of Independence and in 1870 in the Capture of Rome.

In 1895-96 the regiment provided four officers and 80 troops to units deployed to Eritrea for the First Italo-Ethiopian War. On 11 March 1898 the regiment switched number with the 2nd Field Artillery Regiment and was now based in Ferrara. In 1911-12 the regiment provided 14 officers and 326 troops for units deployed for the Italo-Turkish War. On 1 January 1914 the regiment ceded its III Group to help form the 30th Field Artillery Regiment.

=== World War I ===
At the outbreak of World War I the regiment was assigned, together with the Brigade "Casale" and Brigade "Pavia", to the 12th Division. At the time the regiment consisted of a command, three groups with a combined eight batteries equipped with 75/27 mod. 06 field guns, and a depot. During the war the regiment's depot formed an undetermined number of siege batteries. During the war the regiment fought at Oslavia, in the village of Peuma, and on Podgora hill in 1915. In January 1916 the regiment was again at Oslavia, before being transferred to the Asiago plateau for the Battle of Asiago in June. In August 1916 the regiment fought in the Battle of Gorizia. In fall 1917 the regiment fought in the Eighth Battle of the Isonzo and Ninth Battle of the Isonzo on Monte San Marco. The regiment returned to Monte San Marco for the Tenth Battle of the Isonzo and during the Eleventh Battle of the Isonzo the regiment was at Orehovlje. During the retreat to the Piave river after the Battle of Caporetto the regiment participated in delaying actions at the Tagliamento river and then in the First Battle of the Piave River. In 1918 the regiment fought on the Montello during the Second Battle of the Piave River, and at Ponte della Priula during the Battle of Vittorio Veneto.

On 1 August 1920 the 35th Field Artillery Regiment was disbanded and its personnel and materiel transferred to the 14th Field Artillery Regiment, which in turn transferred most of its personnel to help form the 14th Heavy Field Artillery Regiment in Ferrara. In 1923 the regiment's IV Group participated in the Italian occupation of Corfu. In 1926 the 14th Field Artillery Regiment moved from Pesaro to Bari and was assigned to the 23rd Territorial Division of Bari. The regiment consisted of a command, one group with 100/17 mod. 14 howitzers, two groups with 75/27 mod. 11 field guns, one group with mule-carried 75/13 mod. 15 mountain guns, and a depot. On 31 October of the same year the 14th Heavy Field Artillery Regiment was disbanded and its regimental command and depot used to reform the 30th Field Artillery Regiment.

In January 1935 the division was renamed 23rd Infantry Division "Murge" and consequently the regiment changed its name to 14th Artillery Regiment "Murge". In 1935 the regiment formed the 9th Support Battery, the XXXII Supply Group, and the 127th veterinary infirmary for the Second Italo-Ethiopian War. The regiment also provided 32 officers and 1,989 enlisted to augment deployed units. In April 1939 the division participated in the Italian invasion of Albania. On 25 April 1939 the division headquarter arrived in Gjirokastër with the division's units taking up residence in southern Albania. On 24 May 1939 the division changed its name to 23rd Infantry Division "Ferrara", a name change that included the 14th Artillery Regiment. As the 14th Infantry Division "Ferrara" was now based permanently in the Italian protectorate of Albania, the division's depots in Italy formed the 47th Infantry Division "Bari", which included the 47th Artillery Regiment "Bari", as replacement.

=== World War II ===
On 10 June 1940, the day Italy entered World War II, the regiment consisted of a command, command unit, one group with 100/17 mod. 16 howitzers, one group with 75/13 mod. 15 mountain guns, one group with 75/18 mod. 35 howitzers, and an anti-aircraft battery with 20/65 mod. 35 anti-aircraft guns. In July 1940 the regiment transferred a newly formed group with 100/17 mod. 16 howitzers to the 19th Artillery Regiment "Venezia" and received a group with 75/27 mod. 11 field guns in return. The regiment was assigned to the 23rd Infantry Division "Ferrara", which also included the 47th Infantry Regiment "Ferrara" and 48th Infantry Regiment "Ferrara", which were all based in southern Albania.

The 23rd Infantry Division "Ferrara" participated in the Greco-Italian War from the beginning and on 30 October 1940 the division's regiments entered Greek territory. As Greek resistance grew the Ferrara's advance came to a halt. On 6–7 November 1940 the Greeks counterattacked and by 10 November by 16 November the Ferrara was in full retreat. By 26 November the remnants of division held only a small sliver of Greek territory and were ordered to retreat. Almost fully destroyed the division had to be taken out of the front on 3 December 1940.

The Ferrara was soon forced to return to the front and fought on 6–7 December a defensive battle south of Tepelenë. During the German invasion of Greece in April 1941, the Ferrara pursued retreating Greek forces. After the war the division remained on garrison duty in Albania.

On 15 November 1941 the regiment's group with 75/27 mod. 11 field guns was disbanded. In April 1942 the division was transferred to Montenegro, where it participated in Operation Schwarz against Yugoslav partisans. After the announcement of the Armistice of Cassibile on 8 September 1943 the Ferrara and its regiments surrendered to invading German forces and was officially disbanded on 25 September 1943.

For its conduct and sacrifice in the Greco-Italian War the 14th Artillery Regiment "Ferrara" was awarded a Gold Medal of Military Valor, which was affixed to the regiment's flag and is depicted on the regiment's coat of arms.

=== Cold War ===
On 1 February 1949 the 14th Field Artillery Regiment was reformed in Foggia and consisted of a command and two groups with 100/17 mod. 14 howitzers. On 1 September of the same year the regiment was assigned to the Infantry Division "Avellino". In 1950 the regiment formed a battery with 100/17 mod. 14 howitzers, which deployed with the Italian Army's Security Corps to Somalia during the Italian administration of the Trust Territory of Somaliland. On 15 April 1952 the regiment was transferred to the reformed Infantry Division "Pinerolo" and its two groups were re-equipped with QF 25-pounder field guns. On 1 January 1953 the regiment added a third group with QF 25-pounder field guns and the V Light Anti-aircraft Group with 40/56 autocannons.

At the beginning of 1955 the regiment's I Group with QF 25-pounder field guns was placed in reserve status. On 30 April of the same year the I, II, III and V groups were disbanded and the next day the II Group was renumbered as I Group, and a new II Mixed Group was formed, which consisted of the 10th Battery with M114 155mm howitzers and the 13th Light Anti-aircraft Battery with 40/56 autocannons. On 15 March 1957 the regiment formed a Light Aircraft Section with L-21B artillery observation planes.

In 1960 the regiment's I Group was re-equipped with 105/14 mod. 56 pack howitzers and on 20 October of the same year the Light Aircraft Section was transferred to the command of the division. On 31 March 1961 the II Mixed Group and 10th Battery were disbanded and regiment consisted of the I Group and 13th Light Anti-aircraft Battery. In 1962 the Infantry Division "Pinerolo" was reduced to Infantry Brigade "Pinerolo" and consequently on 31 August 1962 the regimental command and command unit left Foggia and moved to Trieste. The next day the I Group and 13th Light Anti-aircraft Battery formed the Field Artillery Group "Pinerolo" in Foggia.

The same day, 1 September 1962, the 14th Field Artillery Regiment was assigned to the Military Command Trieste. On 10 October of the same year the regiment received the CV Self-propelled Anti-tank Group with M36 tank destroyers from the 35th Self-propelled Anti-tank Artillery Regiment. On 29 November 1963 the regiment received the II Group with QF 25-pounder field guns from the 3rd Heavy Field Artillery Regiment. On the same date the II Groups was renumbered as I Group, while the CV Self-propelled Anti-tank Group was renamed and renumbered as II Group. On 1 January 1965 the two groups were re-equipped with 105/22 mod. 14/61 howitzers. On 1 December 1968 the Military Command Trieste was renamed Trieste Troops Command.

During the 1975 army reform the army disbanded the regimental level and newly independent battalions and groups were granted for the first time their own flags: on 6 September the regiment's II Group was disbanded and on 30 September the regiment was disbanded. The next day the regiment's I Group was renamed 14th Field Artillery Group "Murge" and assigned to the Trieste Troops Command. To avoid confusion with the 48th Infantry Battalion "Ferrara" the group was named for the regiment's original name, the Murge plateau in Apulia. The group consisted of a command, a command and services battery, and three batteries with 105/22 mod. 14/61 howitzers, which were replaced with M114 155mm howitzers within the same year. After being equipped with M114 155mm howitzers the group fielded 485 men (37 officers, 58 non-commissioned officers, and 390 soldiers).

On 12 November 1976 the President of the Italian Republic Giovanni Leone assigned with decree 846 the flag and traditions of the 14th Artillery Regiment "Ferrara" to the group. In 1986 the Italian Army abolished the divisional level, including the Trieste Troops Command, and consequently on 1 October 1986 the group was assigned to the Artillery Command of the 5th Army Corps.

=== Recent times ===
On 28 February 1991 the 14th Field Artillery Group "Murge" was placed in reserve status. On 8 May of the same year the flag of the 14th Artillery Regiment "Ferrara" was transferred to the Shrine of the Flags in the Vittoriano in Rome and on 30 June the group was officially disbanded.
