= Cesare Amè =

Italian general and intelligence officer

- Cesare Amè

10th Chief of the Servizio Informazioni Militare
- In office 20 September 1940 – 18 August 1943
- Preceded by: Giacomo Carboni

Personal details
- Born: 18 November 1892 Cumiana, Kingdom of Italy
- Died: 30 June 1983 (aged 90) Rome, Italy
- Spouse: Angela Bettini (m. 1927)
- Education: Military Academy of Modena

Military service
- Allegiance: Kingdom of Italy; Italy
- Branch/service: Royal Italian Army; Italian Army
- Years of service: 1912–1948
- Rank: Divisional general

Cesare Amè (18 November 1892 – 30 June 1983) was an Italian general and intelligence officer, chief of the Servizio Informazioni Militare (the Italian military-intelligence service) from 1940 to 1943.

== Biography ==
Born in Cumiana, Amè formed at the Military Academy of Modena; appointed second lieutenant in permanent service in 1912, he joined the 92º Regiment of Turin, with whom he took part to the Italo-Turkish War. Promoted liaison officer, after the World War I he was awarded one silver and two bronze medals.

In 1921, Amè entered the Italian Military Intelligence Service (Servizio Informazioni Militare, SIM), being promoted to lieutenant colonel in 1927 and to colonel in 1937. He was appointed chief of SIM in 1940; during his service he tried to persuade Benito Mussolini to not entering war because of the Italian army's lack of preparation, and had to face Mussolini's reluctance to disclose his plans.

On 18 August 1943, after the fall of Mussolini, Amè was removed from office by Pietro Badoglio and was assigned to the command of the Italian army division in Ljubljana. In 1948 he was appointed divisional general. He was later author of Guerra segreta in Italia ("Secret war in Italy", 1956) and of Il Servizio informazioni militare dalla sua costituzione alla fine della seconda guerra mondiale ("The Military Intelligence Service from its establishment to the end of World War II", released anonymously in 1957).

== Works ==
- Guerra segreta in Italia 1940-1943. Rome: Casini. 1954.
- Il Servizio informazioni militare dalla sua costituzione alla fine della seconda guerra mondiale. Rome. 1957.

== Bibliography ==
- De Lutiis, Giuseppe (1988). "Amè, Cesare". Dizionario Biografico degli Italiani (in Italian). Vol. 34: Primo supplemento A–C. Rome: Istituto dell'Enciclopedia Italiana. ISBN 978-88-12-00032-6.
- Bagnoli, Gabriele (2019). Cesare Amé e i suoi Agenti. L'intelligence italiana nella Seconda guerra mondiale. Rome: Idrovolante Edizioni. ISBN 978-8899564360.
