= XXX Army Corps (Italy) =

Royal Italian Army corps between 1915 and 1943

The XXX Army Corps (Italian: XXX Corpo d'Armata) was a corps of the Royal Italian Army between 1915 and 1943. It was also known as Special Army Corps between November 1940 and June 1941.

== History ==
There was a XXX Corps in World War I, formed on 5 October 1917 and dissolved on 26 December 1918.

On 15 November 1940, the Special Army Corps (Italian: Corpo d'Armata Speciale) was created in Padua by transforming the Rapid Army Corps. It was sent to Albania to protect the coastal sector on the 11th Army front, on the Greek-Albanian border. It was composed of the "Siena", "Acqui" and "Trieste" Divisions and fought in the Greco-Italian War until 23 April 1941, when it had reached the Kalamas river. It remained there as an occupation unit until the end of June, when it was renamed XXX Corps.

On 1 October 1941, the XXX Corps was transferred to Campania where it assumed control of the 1st Infantry Division "Superga" and oversaw the defense of the port of Naples and its coastal sectors. It remained there until 26 December 1942, when it was transferred to Tunisia where it became responsible for the Sousse - Sfax coastal sector, under command of the German 5th Panzer Army. The Corps was destroyed during the Tunisian campaign (May 1943).

On 15 July, the XXX Corps was reformed in Sassari by transformation of the Northern Sardinia Tactical Command. The Corps was employed in the defense of the central-northern parts of Sardinia. After the armistice of 8 September and the following evacuation of the German units stationed on the island, the XXX Corps was dissolved on 25 October 1943.

== Composition (1940-41) ==
- 33rd Infantry Division "Acqui"
- 51st Infantry Division "Siena"
- 101st Motorized Division "Trieste"

== Composition (1943) ==
- 31st Infantry Division "Calabria"
- 47th Infantry Division "Bari"
- 204th Coastal Division

== Commanders ==
- Giovanni Messe (1940.11.15 – 1941.07.14)
- Ercole Roncaglia (1941.07.14 – 1941.07.25) (acting)
- Francesco Zingales (1941.07.25 – 1941.12.24)
- Renato Coturri (1941.12.24 – 1942.02.21) (acting)
- Umberto Mondino (1942.02.21 – 1942.06.10)
- Vittorio Sogno (1942.06.10 – 1943.05.08)
- Gian Giacomo Castagna (1943.07.15 – 1943.09.08)
