= Servizio Informazioni Militare =

Servizio Informazioni Militare (SIM)
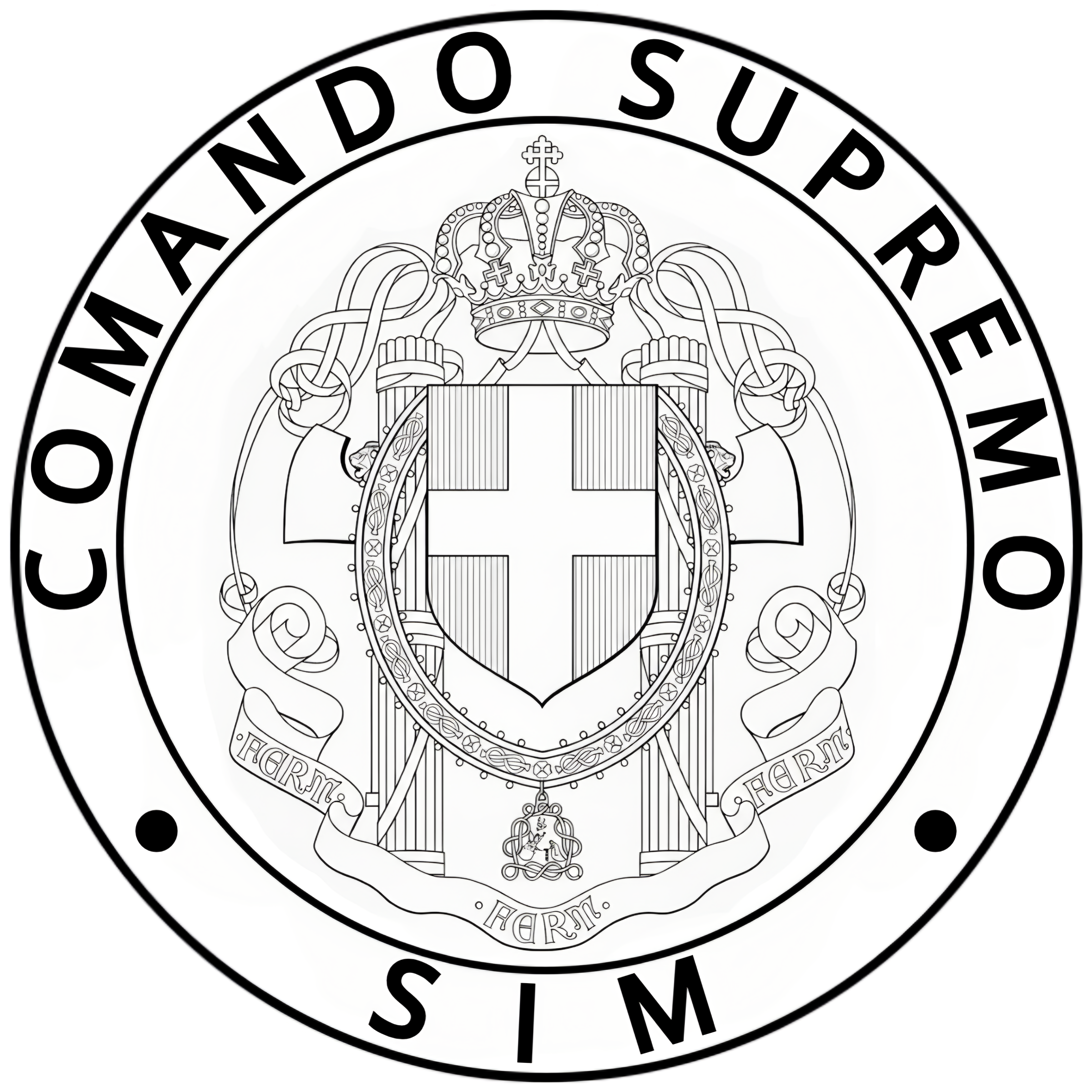
- SIM seal
- Active: 1925–1944
- Countries: Kingdom of Italy
- Branch: Royal Italian Army
- Type: Military intelligence
- Size: over 300 officers, 1,200 NCOs and specialists, and more than 9,000 secret agents (c. 1943)
- Part of: Comando Supremo
- Engagements: Second Italo-Ethiopian War; Spanish Civil War; World War II

Commanders
- Notable commanders: Mario Roatta; Cesare Amè

The Military Intelligence Service (Italian: Servizio Informazioni Militare, or SIM) was the military intelligence organization for the Royal Italian Army of the Kingdom of Italy from 1925 to 1944. Established by Fascist dictator Benito Mussolini, it was the Italian equivalent to the German Abwehr.

In the early years of the war, the SIM scored important intelligence successes; among its most notable achievements was cracking the United States Black Code used by Colonel Bonner Fellers to communicate plans for British military operations in North Africa in 1942, which substantially aided Axis forces in the theater.

The SIM was highly efficient and performed favourably to its German counterpart. Bernard Montgomery's Chief Intelligence Officer, Brigadier Edgar Williams, remarked that the Italians "made far more intelligent deductions from the information they received than did the Germans." According to historian Thaddeus Holt, the SIM was the ablest Axis secret service on the technical level, and it exceeded by far any other secret service in Europe outside the USSR.

== History ==
The Servizio Informazioni Militari was instituted in October 1925 under the Fascist regime. Its activity was supported by the Air Force Information Service (Servizio Informazioni Aeronautiche, SIA) and the Navy Secret Information Service (Servizio Informazioni Segrete, SIS). The SIM had its headquarters at Forte Braschi, in the Quarter Q. XIV Trionfale, within the Municipio XIV. Within ten years, SIM evolved from a purely military intelligence and counter-intelligence service into a modern comprehensive structure capable of offering full intelligence coverage on domestic and overseas issues. On February 6, 1927, it was placed directly under the head of the High Command and charged with responsibility for internal and external security for all three armed forces. In 1934 funds available to the new service were doubled, as also was the number of specialised sections and personnel.

During the second half of the 1930s the activities of SIM, in particular under the leadership of Mario Roatta, took a rather sinister direction: SIM was implicated in an impressive chain of crimes and acts of violence, including the assassination of the most active anti-Fascist exile, Carlo Rosselli, together with his brother Nello, on 9 June 1937. SIM was also behind the assassination in Marseille of King Alexander of Yugoslavia and French Foreign Minister Louis Barthou.

SIM experienced its greatest interwar successes during the Ethiopian Campaign and the Spanish Civil War, managing to cut off the flow of arms to both Ethiopia and the Spanish Republic and providing the Italian command with a complete picture of the enemy forces. During the Ethiopian war it participated in the subversion of local chieftains who should have been loyal to Haile Selassie.

Shortly before Italy's entry into World War II, Brigadier general Giacomo Carboni, chief of the SIM, wrote a series of reports to Benito Mussolini wherein the Italian preparation to the war was described as inadequate. Carboni drafted pessimistic reports on Italian and German military capabilities. As a result Carboni was dismissed from his post at the SIM.

During the war SIM, whose sphere of action was generally limited to military objectives, is credited with operational efficiency. This included the forecasting of the Allied landing in North Africa, a contingency not considered by the Abwehr. However, this service often was not consulted by Mussolini and the military hierarchy.

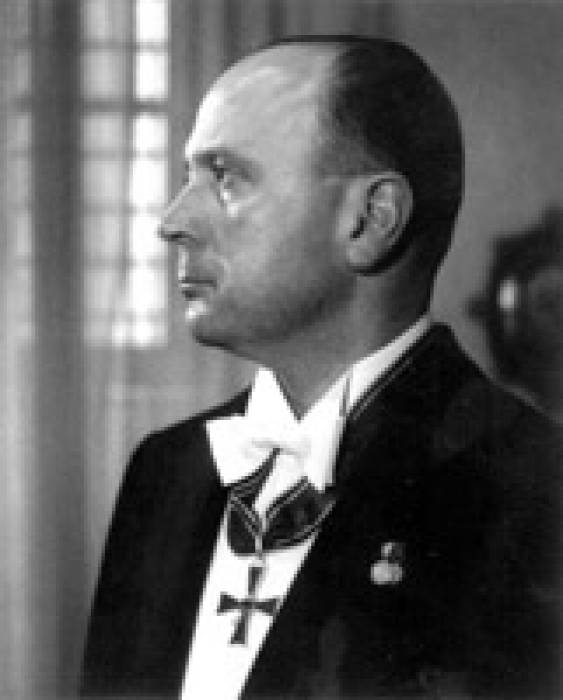
Rodolfo Siviero

SIM was dissolved in 1944 and was replaced for a few years by a small intelligence office within the General Staff. Only in 1949 did the Allies allow the service to be re-established as SIFAR [Armed Forces Intelligence Service].

Just before the Italian surrender, Pietro Badoglio put his protégé Giacomo Carboni back in charge of SIM (September 1943). After the Armistice, many SIM agents continued to work on behalf of the Kingdom of the South and of the Italian resistance. SIM spy Rodolfo Siviero coordinated the Italian partisans' intelligence activities from the Jewish art historian Giorgio Castelfranco's house on the Lungarno Serristori in Florence (now the Casa Siviero museum). Today he is known mainly for his role in the recovery of artworks stolen from Italy during the Second World War as part of the 'Nazi plunder'.

=== Intra-Axis co-operation ===
In 1938 General Gamba, chief of the SIM Cryptographic Bureau, requested cooperation in the cryptanalytic field at the Cipher Department of the High Command of the Wehrmacht (OKW/Chi). The Germans agreed to share results on French diplomatic and military systems. This collaboration was expanded and provided the Germans with important cryptologic material like the U.S. Military Intelligence code. OKW/Chi had previously worked hard on solving the code, but had set it aside as too difficult. The Servizio Informazioni Militare provided also OKW/Chi with a captured Swedish diplomatic codebook and with a Turkish code that Chi was trying hard to break. There was less cooperation between SIM and the Abwehr on the working level. The SIM did not trust the Abwehr to honour agreements such as not to run clandestine networks in Italy. They monitored German intelligence activities and agents in Italy. Nor were the Germans apprised of any of the doubling of Allied agents which SIM conducted with great success. As the war went on relations became strained since the Germans came to distrust the Italians. After the Fall of the Fascist regime in Italy when Benito Mussolini was deposed on 24–25 July 1943, the Servizio Informazioni Militare turned to OKW/Chi for help and cooperation. Generaloberst Alfred Jodl, however, forbade any further liaison, and from that point on, no agency contact was made or material exchanged.

During the war SIM also cooperated with other Axis intelligence agencies, including those of Japan, Finland and Hungary. At regular intervals, technological and information exchanges occurred at the Penang submarine-base in Japanese-occupied Malaya, which served Axis submarine forces of the Italian Italian Regia Marina, German Kriegsmarine and Imperial Japanese Navy. The Hungarians maintained liaison officers in Rome and made the results of their work available to the Italians.

=== SID ===
On 1 December 1943, after the creation of the Italian Social Republic, the new government established the SID (Defensive Information Service), the new Republic of Salò intelligence service. The SID was operational a month before its formal establishment, and its headquarters were located in Volta Mantovana. The SID was the only RSI Armed Forces information body, with espionage, counterintelligence and military police tasks. It was headed by Vittorio Foschini, a former journalist known for his anti-German attitudes. In late February 1944, Foschini was kidnapped by the SS as he left Rodolfo Graziani's villa on Lake Garda and disappeared to Germany. He was replaced by Lt-Colonel Candeloro De Leo, a Carabinieri officer described as 'capable and unscrupulous'. De Leo signed an agreement with the German Abwehr, but SID activities were hampered by Nazi Germany's intense hostility toward Italy after the armistice.

In March 1944 the SID departments were briefly as follows:

- Sezione OMEGA (Offensive Intelligence): supposed to run offensive intelligence operations abroad, but the Germans disapproved of this and it existed in name only.
- Sezione DELTA (Defensive Intelligence): this was the most important branch of SID, with the majority of its officers seconded from the Carabinieri. The Rome office of the section was headed by Carabinieri Captain Colombini, probably one of the few fervent Republican Fascists in SlD.
- Sezione SIGMA (Internal Political Intelligence): this section collected information on civilian morale and the reactions of the various classes to the Mussolini regime and to the Germans, who were naturally keenly interested in its reports.
- The Centro Raccolta e Elaborazione Notizie, which was purely an HQ section concerned with evaluating intelligence received. It included however a section carrying out the breaking of Allied codes and cyphers, headed by Frigate captain Luigi Donini - a very lukewarm Republican who had an English wife and was closely supervised by the Gestapo. This section enjoyed constant and close German supervision at all levels.
- Sezione KAPPA (Communications): this section installed W/T sets to enable Mussolini to keep in direct touch with SID HQ, and also similar facilities to the offices in Rome, Florence and other important centres, using codes supplied by the cryptographic branch. There was, however, a sad deficiency in radio sets, both in quantity and quality.
- Sezione ZETA: Postal Censorship throughout Republican Italy, using mainly retired Army officers.

The SID was dismantled soon after the liberation of Italy, on 25 April 1945.

== Human rights abuses ==
SIM elements committed a whole series of crimes. On the direct order of Mussolini SIM arranged the assassination of the brothers Carlo Rosselli and Nello Rosselli in France. The murder was carried out by French fascist-leaning and anti-communist Cagoulards, in exchange for 100 semiautomatic Beretta rifles and the promise of future shipments. Before the start of the Second Italo-Ethiopian War SIM supplied Ethiopians with faulty gas masks. During the Spanish Civil War, it sunk Spanish Republican ships by loading explosives in the holds and it introduced bacteria in food destined for Spain in order to spread epidemics.

== Organization ==
SIM was subordinate to the Deputy Chief of Staff of the Army for the performance of strictly military functions and to the Undersecretary of War for the performance of duties of a non-military nature. SIM had five major sections:

- Sezione Calderini (concerned with 'offensive' intelligence operations including sabotage beyond Italy's borders).
- Sezione Zuretti (Data analysis and interpretation);
- Sezione Bonsignore (Counterespionage). For a brief period in 1940-41 this section was detached from SIM and became an autonomous service under the name "CSMSS" (Controspionaggio Militare e Servizi Speciali). In January 1941, it was restored to SIM.
- Sezione Crittografica (Cryptography): this section attacked foreign crypto-systems and produced enciphered codes for the Royal Italian Army and the Regia Marina;
- Sezione personale e amministrativa.

In 1934 Mussolini doubled SIM's budget to fund a greatly expanded effort against Great Britain and to permit SIM to add assassination and subversion to its activities. In 1940, upon Italy's entrance into the war, SIM numbered 150 officers, 300 NCOs, and 400 other ranks. By the time the war was at its peak, it numbered over 300 officers, 1,200 NCOs and specialists, and directed the activities of more than 9,000 secret agents spread abroad.

== Pre-war operations ==
SIM was very active in the interwar period. It oversaw support for Croatian Ustaše and Macedonian nationalists in Yugoslavia and arranged the assassination of Alexander I of Yugoslavia during a visit to France (1934).

By the mid-1930s Italian counterespionage, led by Colonel Santo Emanuele, had been involved in France through the Cagoule, taking advantage with great skill of the opportunities this provided to penetrate the Deuxième Bureau. Information obtained by SIM in France enabled Italian authorities to arrest the members of a French spy ring in Italy in 1939.

Before the Ethiopian campaign, SIM secured the text of the secret Hoare–Laval Pact, which sanctioned an Anglo-French agreement for the partition of Ethiopia among France, Britain and Italy on the eve of the Second Italo-Ethiopian War. The surfacing of the draft of this pact brought about its failure and the resignation of both Samuel Hoare and Pierre Laval and the subsequent start of unilateral Italian military operation for the conquest of Ethiopia. A. J. P. Taylor argued that it was the event that "killed the League of Nations".

In February 1936 Emilio Faldella, head of the special SIM section for East Africa (AO), infiltrated Palestinian agent Jacir Bey in Negus Haile Selassie's entourage. Jacir Bey offered to persuade the Emperor to reach a peace agreement with Italy, effectively turning Ethiopia into an Italian protectorate. Terms involved the maintenance of Haile Selassie on the throne and continuance of Ethiopian sovereignty over an independent but reduced state in Shewa with a corridor to the sea at the port of Assab. In return, all of Tigray and border areas of Eritrea and Somalia would be ceded to Italy, and unconquered Ethiopia would be placed under a strong Italian protectorate on the model of Manchukuo. The plan, however, never materialized, and Italian troops entered the capital, Addis Ababa, on 5 May 1936. Ethiopia was annexed to Italy on 7 May.

== During World War II ==
=== The cracking of the Black Code ===
Cesare Amè

The biggest Italian intelligence victory scored during World War II was the acquisition of U.S. encipherment tables obtained through the break-in of the U.S. Embassy in Rome in September 1941 authorized by General Cesare Amè, head of the SIM. These tables were used by U.S. Ambassadors worldwide to communicate back to Washington, D.C. In October 1940, Colonel Bonner Fellers was assigned as military attaché to the U.S. embassy in Egypt and was to report to his American superiors the details of British military activities in the Mediterranean Theater of Operations. The British, hoping to eventually get the Americans into the war against the Axis powers, were very accommodating to Fellers giving him nearly full access to British operations in North Africa. Fellers, who was something of an Anglophobe, usually authored his dispatches in a less than favourable manner casting great doubt about the long-term success of the British and her Commonwealth allies fight against the Italo-German army in North Africa. His reports were read by Franklin D. Roosevelt, the head of American intelligence, and the Joint Chiefs of Staff. Using the encipherment tables the Italian SIM was able to decipher Fellers' communiques with Washington in a matter of hours often gleaning important information about the British in North Africa such as its current positions, sustained losses, expected reinforcements, current supply situation, future plans, morale, etc. which it quickly reported to the Italian and German military in North Africa. The leak ended on June 29, when Fellers switched to the new U.S. code system. During the eight months or so of reading Fellers' dispatches to Washington, Rommel would refer to Fellers as "die gute Quelle" (the good source).

=== Operations in Yugoslavia ===
Shortly before the start of World War II, SIM had broken Yugoslav military codes. When, in April 1941, Italian forces in Albania were threatened by a planned Yugoslav strike, SIM operators sent coded messages to the Yugoslav divisions, ordering them to postpone the scheduled offensive and return to their start-lines. By the time the Yugoslavs realised they had been duped, the Italian defences had been restored. During the occupation of Yugoslavia, the SIM turned its attention to the communications of partisan groups and by mid-1943 had solved two systems used by the Chetniks and one used by Tito's Partisans.

=== Guerrilla in East Africa ===
SIM played an important role in Italian guerrilla war in Ethiopia. Francesco De Martini, captain of the SIM, was one of the leaders of Italian insurgency in East Africa. In January 1942, he blew up a British ammunition dump in Massaua (Eritrea). After crossing the Red Sea in the motorboat Zam Zam, De Martini fled to Saudi Arabia. He made contact with the Italian consulate in that country, and from the Yemeni coast organized a group of Eritrean sailors (with small boats called sambuco) in order to identify, and notify Rome with his radio, of the Royal Navy movements throughout the Red Sea. Major Max Harari, head of the British military intelligence, offered a reward for his capture. On 1 August 1942, while attempting to come back to Eritrea, De Martini was captured on Dahlak Island by sailors from HMS Arpha and imprisoned in Sudan until the end of the war.

=== The Borg Pisani affair ===
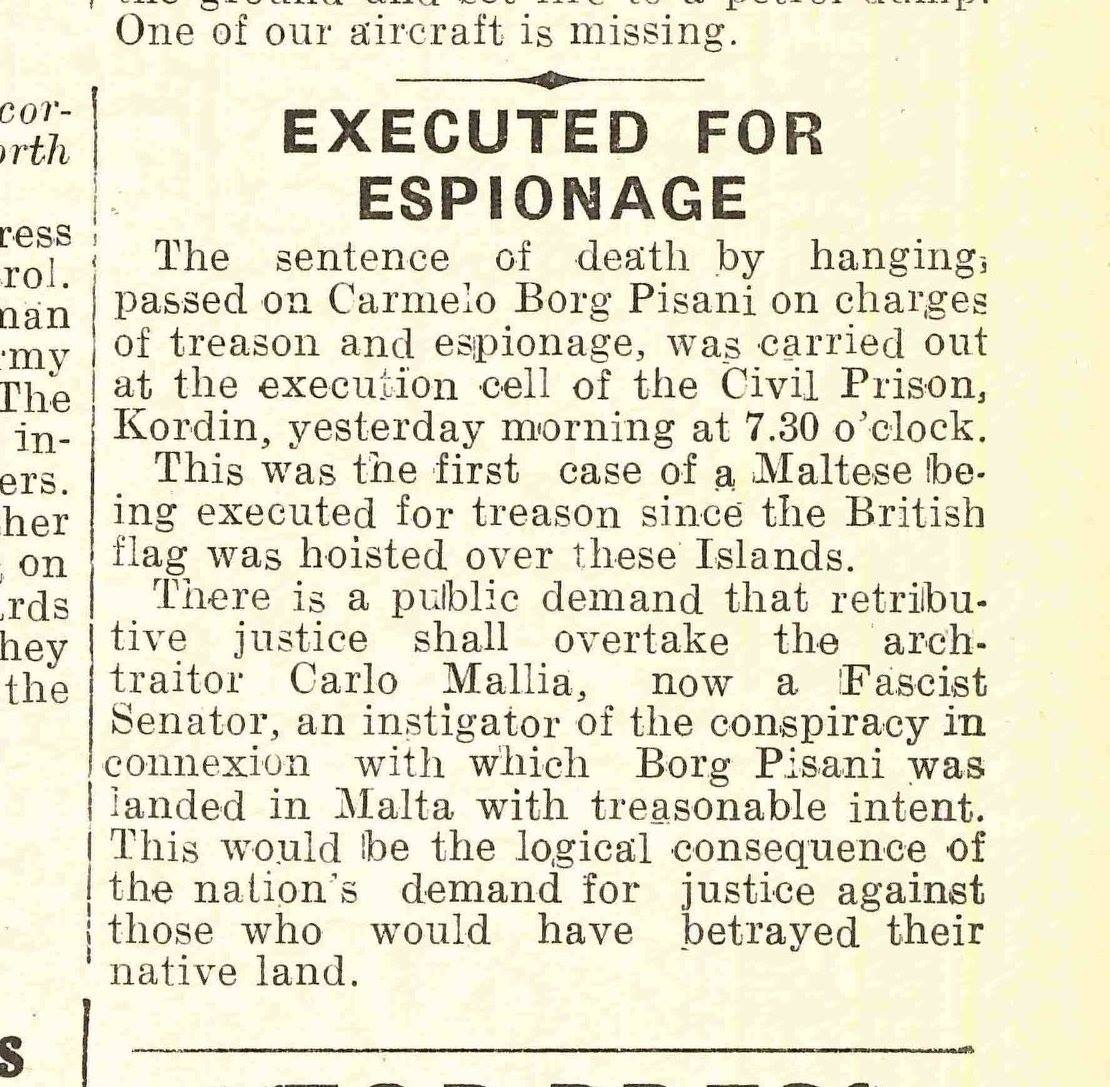
Excerpt of the Sunday Times of Malta about Borg Pisani's execution

On 18 May 1942, Maltese irredentist and SIM spy Carmelo Borg Pisani was sent on an espionage mission to Malta, to check British defences and help prepare for the planned Axis invasion of the island (Operazione C3). Borg Pisani was recognized by one of his childhood friends, Cpt. Tom Warrington, who denounced him. British Intelligence kept him under arrest in a house in Sliema till August. He was then transferred to Corradino prison, accused of treason. On 12 November 1942, he stood trial under closed doors in front of three judges, headed by Chief Justice of Malta Sir George Borg, and defended by two lawyers. His plea that he had renounced British citizenship by returning his passport and acquisition of Italian citizenship (which would have granted him the status of prisoner of war) was not upheld by the military court. On 19 November 1942, he was publicly sentenced to death for espionage, for taking up arms against the Government and forming part of a conspiracy to overthrow the government. His execution by hanging took place at 7:30AM on Saturday, 28 November 1942. Borg Pisani was posthumously awarded the Gold Medal of Military Valor, the highest Italian military award, by King Victor Emmanuel III a few days after his death.

=== Sezione 5 ===
SIM had a large, well-organized cryptanalytic department, Sezione 5, which attacked foreign crypto-systems. This section was headed by General Vittorio Gamba, a published student of cryptology who had been breaking codes since World War I, and was located in Rome. Also under Gamba was a subsection headed by the elderly Colonel Gino Mancini that produced codes and ciphers for the Royal Italian Army and higher-level enciphered codes for the Regia Marina. SIM's cryptographic section concentrated on military and diplomatic traffic. By the time the war was at its peak, SIM's interception and decryption operations had taken on immense proportions. On average 8,000 radio messages were intercepted each month, 6,000 were studied and out of these 3,500 were translated. The flow was so large that Colonel Cesare Amè, the head of SIM, began to publish a daily bulletin - Bulletin I - that summarized the most significant information. Copies of the bulletin were sent to Mussolini, to the Chief of General Staff and to king Victor Emmanuel (via his aide-de-camp Paolo Puntoni), while a good portion of the diplomatic traffic was sent to Count Galeazzo Ciano, the Italian Foreign Minister. The codes of several countries were attacked including France, Turkey, Romania, United States, Britain and the Vatican. Foreign Minister Galeazzo Ciano noted in his diary that Sezione 5 cryptanalysts routinely read British, Romanian, and neutral Turkey's diplomatic traffic.

== Chiefs ==
No.	Portrait	Chief of the Servizio Informazioni Militare	Took office	Left office	Time in office	Defence branch	Ref.
1	Attilio Vigevano	Colonel; Attilio Vigevano (1874–1927)	15 October 1925	April 1926	5 months	Royal Italian Army	–
2	Carlo Barbieri	Colonel; Carlo Barbieri (1883–1951)	April 1926	1927	–	Royal Italian Army	–
3	Luigi Toselli	Colonel; Luigi Toselli (1876–1941)	1927	July 1929	–	Royal Italian Army	–
4	Mario Vercellino	Brigadier general Mario Vercellino (1879–1961)	July 1929	December 1931	2 years, 153 days	Royal Italian Army	–
5	Vittorio Sogno	Colonel; Vittorio Sogno (1885–1971)	January 1932	January 1934	2 years, 0 days	Royal Italian Army	–
6	Mario Roatta	Colonel; Mario Roatta (1887–1968)	January 1934	September 1936	2 years, 244 days	Royal Italian Army	
7	Paolo Angioy	Colonel; Paolo Angioy (1890–1975)	October 1936	June 1937	243 days	Royal Italian Army	
8	Donato Tripiccione	Divisional general Donato Tripiccione (1889–1943)	July 1937	17 August 1939	2 years, 47 days	Royal Italian Army	–
9	Giacomo Carboni	Brigadier General; Giacomo Carboni (1889–1973)	3 November 1939	20 September 1940	322 days	Royal Italian Army	–
10	Cesare Amè	Colonel; Cesare Amè (1892–1983)	20 September 1940	18 August 1943	2 years, 332 days	Royal Italian Army	–

== See also ==
- History of espionage
- Italian intelligence agencies
- OVRA: the secret police of Fascist Italy.
- La Cagoule: French fascist-leaning and anti-communist terrorist group that regularly collaborated with SIM.
- Kenpeitai: the military police arm of the Imperial Japanese Army from 1881 to 1945.
- Tokubetsu Keisatsutai: the Imperial Japanese Navy's military police.
- Wilhelm Franz Canaris: a German admiral and the chief of the Abwehr from 1935 to 1944.
