= V Army Corps (Italy) =

5º Corpo d'armata 5th Army Corps
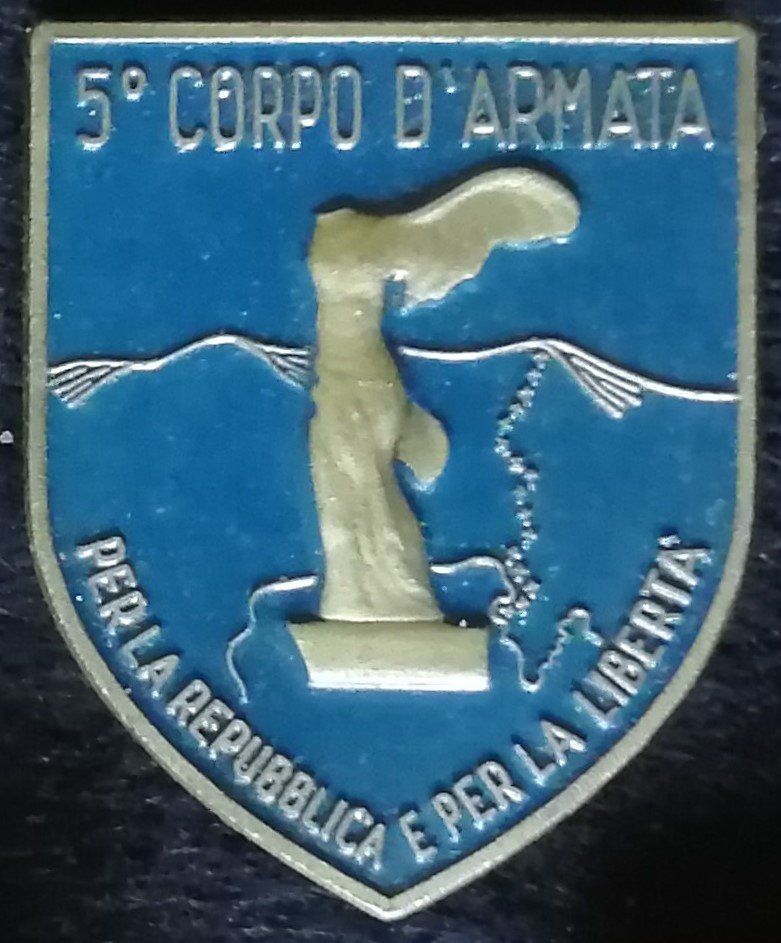
- Badge of the 5th Army Corps (IT)
- Active: 1 April 1860 - 2013
- Country: Kingdom of Italy; Italian Republic
- Branch: Royal Italian Army; Italian Army
- Role: Corps Command
- Garrison/HQ: Vittorio Veneto
- Engagements: Expedition of the Thousand; Third Italian War of Independence; World War I World War II

The V Army Corps was one of three corps the Italian Army fielded during the Cold War. Based in the regions of Veneto and Friuli-Venezia Giulia the corps was the army's main combat force. The 5th Army Corps was arrayed close to the Yugoslavian border and tasked with meeting any Warsaw Pact forces that crossed the border. On the left flank of the corps the 4th Alpine Army Corps was tasked with blocking the Alpine passes and in the rear of the corps the 3rd Army Corps served as operational reserve. After the end of the Cold War the corps was reduced in size and on 1 October 1997 it became the 1st Defence Forces Command (COMFOD 1°). In 2013 the COMFOD 1° was disbanded and its function and brigades taken over by the 20th Infantry Division Friuli in Florence.

== History ==
=== Origins ===
The history of the 5th Army Corps begins with Garibaldis Expedition of the Thousand. After Garibaldi scored victory after victory in his conquest of the Kingdom of the Two Sicilies, the Victor Emmanuel II of Sardinia decided to march south to secure the conquered territory for himself and thus unite Italy. The V Army Corps was raised and marched south with the main Army where it fought in the battles of San Giuliano on 26 October 1860 and Garigliano on 29 October 1860 and participated in the siege of Gaeta.

After the war the corps was garrisoned in Florence, the capital of the newly united Italy. It commanded two elite divisions: the 1st Division of the Line in Florence and the 15th Division of the Line in Perugia. Both divisions were made up by Grenadier regiments.

At the outbreak of the third Italian war of independence the V Army Corps remained at first in Florence, but when the main Italian army failed to break through the Austrian Quadrilatero fortress system south of Lake Garda in the Battle of Custoza, the corps marched six divisions over the Apennine mountains, joined up with General Enrico Cialdinis eight divisions of the IV Army Corps in the Romagna and crossed the lower Po and Adige rivers in force on 11 July 1866. Bypassing the Austrian fortresses and main army on his left flank Cialdini marched his army all through the Veneto, dispatching one division under Giacomo Medici to invade Trentino and cut the Austrian line of retreat and three divisions under Raffaele Cadorna to march at speed to the city of Trieste. Cialdinis army reached the Isonzo river on 24 July 1866.

=== World War I ===
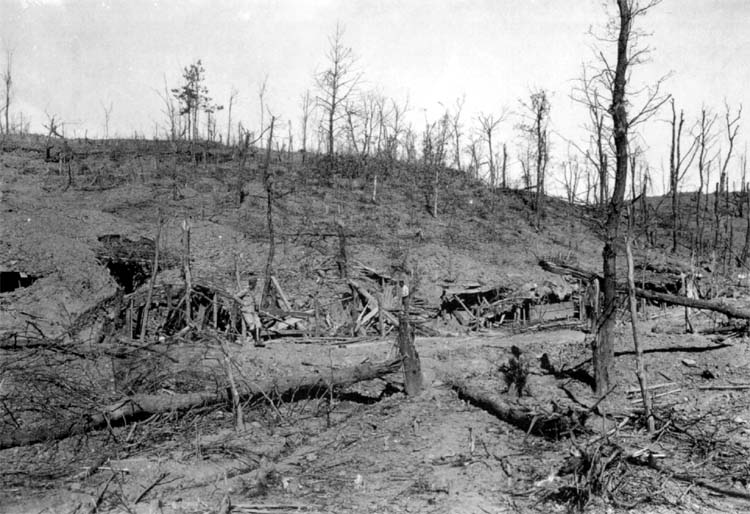
The Asiago plateau after the Battle of Asiago

After the Italian declaration of war against the Austrian Empire on 23 May 1915 the V Army Corps under Lieutenant General Florenzio Aliprandi as part of the 1st Army advanced into Trentino. On the corps left flank the III Army Corps advanced through the Valtellina, Camonica Trompia and Chiese valleys and along the Western shore of Lake Garda. The ultimate goal of the 1st Army was to reach the city of Trento. Although numerically superior the corps failed to reach the city of Trento and its advance through the Adige and Valsugana valleys and over the Asiago plateau soon bogged down in determined Austrian resistance. The corps consisted of the 9th and 15th Division of the Line (Infantry), the 34th Territorial Division, the 2nd, 4th and 8th Bersaglieri regiments and the 6th Alpini Regiment. All soldiers of the 6th Alpini Regiment had been recruited from valleys in the area of operations and thus fought in a territory they knew perfectly well. However the 6th Alpini Regiment was never employed as a whole, but single companies or battalions were given specific mountain summits, ridges or passes to conquer and hold.

- V Army Corps — Lieutenant General Florenzio Aliprindi
  - 9th Division — Lieutenant General Ferruccio Ferri
    - Brigade "Puglie"
      - 71st Infantry Regiment (Battalions II-IV — the regiment's I Battalion was deployed overseas and the IV Battalion had been formed as replacement)
      - 72nd Infantry Regiment (Battalions I-III)
    - Brigade "Roma"
      - 79th Infantry Regiment (Battalions II, III, IV — the regiment's I Battalion was deployed overseas and the IV Battalion had been formed as replacement)
      - 80th Infantry Regiment (Battalions I-III)
    - 29th Field Artillery Regiment (8 × batteries with 75/27 mod. 06 field guns)
    - 12th Company, 1st Engineer Regiment (Sappers)
  - 15th Division — Lieutenant General Luigi Lenchantin
    - Brigade "Abruzzi"
      - 57th Infantry Regiment (I, III, IV — the regiment's II Battalion was deployed overseas and the IV Battalion had been formed as replacement)
      - 58th Infantry Regiment (Battalions I-III)
    - Brigade "Venezia"
      - 83rd Infantry Regiment (Battalions I-III)
      - 84th Infantry Regiment (I, II, IV — the regiment's III Battalion was deployed overseas and the IV Battalion had been formed as replacement)
    - 19th Field Artillery Regiment (6 × batteries with 75/27 mod. 06 field guns — 2 × batteries were assigned to XIV Army Corps) (arrived 26 May)
    - IV Mobile Militia Cavalry Group (7th and 8th Squadrons) (arrived 4 June)
    - 1st Company, 2nd Engineer Regiment (Sappers)
  - 34th Division — Lieutenant General Pasquale Oro (Reserve division formed shortly before Italy's entry into the war)
    - Brigade "Treviso"
      - 115th Infantry Regiment (Battalions I-III)
      - 116th Infantry Regiment (Battalions I-III)
    - Brigade "Ivrea"
      - 161st Infantry Regiment (Battalions I-III)
      - 162nd Infantry Regiment (Battalions I-III)
    - 41st Field Artillery Regiment (6 × batteries with 75/27 mod. 06 field guns)
    - 9th Company, 2nd Engineer Regiment (Sappers)
    - 21st Mobile Militia Cavalry Squadron (arrived 11 June)
    - 23rd Mobile Militia Cavalry Squadron (arrived 29 June)
  - Corps Troops
    - 2nd Bersaglieri Regiment (Battalions IV, XVII, LIII — the regiment's II Battalion was stationed in Libya and the regiment formed the LIII Battalion as replacement)
    - 4th Bersaglieri Regiment (Battalions XXIX, XXXVII, XLIII — the regiment's XXVI and XXXI Battalion were stationed in Rhodes and the regiment formed the XXXVII Battalion as replacement for the XXXI Battalion, while the 9th Bersaglieri Regiment formed the XLIII Battalion as replacement for the XXVI Battalion)
    - 8th Bersaglieri Regiment (Battalions V, XII, XXXVIII — the regiment's III Battalion was stationed in Libya and the regiment formed the XXXVIII Battalion as replacement)
    - XLI Autonomous Bersaglieri Battalion (Mobile Militia) (formed by the 4th Bersaglieri Regiment)
    - XLII Autonomous Bersaglieri Battalion (Mobile Militia) (formed by the 4th Bersaglieri Regiment)
    - XLVIII Autonomous Bersaglieri Battalion (Mobile Militia) (formed by the 8th Bersaglieri Regiment)
    - 6th Alpini Regiment (Alpini battalions operated independently of their regiments)
      - Regular Alpini battalions: Alpini Battalion "Verona", Alpini Battalion "Vicenza", Alpini Battalion "Bassano"
      - Territorial Militia Alpini battalions: Alpini Battalion "Val d’Adige", Alpini Battalion "Val Leogra", Alpini Battalion "Val Brenta"
    - 7th Alpini Regiment (Alpini battalions operated independently of their regiments)
      - Regular Alpini battalions: Alpini Battalion "Feltre"
      - Territorial Militia Alpini battalions: Alpini Battalion "Val Cismon"
    - Reale Guardia di Finanza: I Battalion, V Battalion, VII Battalion, IX Battalion, XVII Battalion, XVIII Battalion; as well as the 11th Company and 52nd Company
    - Regiment "Cavalleggeri di Catania" (22nd) (5 × cavalry squadrons) (arrived 28 May)
    - 5th Field Artillery Regiment (8 × batteries with 75/27 mod. 11 field guns)
    - Mountain Artillery Group "Torino-Aosta", 1st Mountain Artillery Regiment (4 × batteries with 65/17 mod. 13 mountain guns)
    - Mountain Artillery Group "Vicenza", 2nd Mountain Artillery Regiment (4 × batteries with 65/17 mod. 13 mountain guns)
    - Mountain Artillery Group "Oneglia", 3rd Mountain Artillery Regiment (4 × batteries with 65/17 mod. 13 mountain guns)
    - Mountain Artillery Group "Genova", 3rd Mountain Artillery Regiment (2 × batteries with 65/17 mod. 13 mountain guns)
    - 1st Mountain Artillery Battery, Mountain Artillery Group "Torino-Susa", 1st Mountain Artillery Regiment (with 65/17 mod. 13 mountain guns)
    - 8th Mountain Artillery Battery, Mountain Artillery Group "Torino-Pinerolo", 1st Mountain Artillery Regiment (with 65/17 mod. 13 mountain guns)
    - 1st, 13th, 14th, and 1/2 7th Companies, 5th Engineer Regiment (Miners)
    - 11th Telegraphers Company, 3rd Engineer Regiment (Telegraphers)
    - 16th Company, 2nd Engineer Regiment (Sappers) (Brenta-Cismon sector)
    - 16th Company, 1st Engineer Regiment (Sappers) (Agno-Assa sector)

After the initial advance had been brought to a halt by the Austro-Hungarian Army the corps dug in and, although fierce fighting continued the front in the corps' sector remained almost unchanged until 15 May 1916 when Austria unleashed its first major offensive on the Italian front on the Asiago plateau. The V Corps was badly mauled by the Austrian superiority in men and material but did not break. As the Russians began the Brusilov Offensive, on 4 June the Austro-Hungarian High Command decided do end its offensive operations in Italy before its strategic goal - a breakthrough into the Venetian plains behind the main Italian Army - had been achieved.

After the end of the Austrian offensive the corps remained in the same area of operation until the end of the war.

=== World War II ===
After the war the V Army Corps was garrisoned in Trieste and consisted of the 12th Infantry Division "Timavo" in Trieste and the 15th Infantry Division "Bergamo" in Pula. At the outbreak of World War II the corps was guarding the border with Yugoslavia. Headquartered in Pivka it consisted of the 12th Infantry Division "Sassari", 15th Infantry Division "Bergamo" and 57th Infantry Division "Lombardia".

On 6 April 1941, under command of Riccardo Balocco, it participated in the Axis invasion of Yugoslavia. After the end of combat operations the corps took up garrison duties along the Dalmatian coast, but found itself quickly fighting Yugoslav partisans. The corps (commanded by General Renato Coturri, General Alessandro Gloria from January 1943 and by General Antonio Scuero from May 1943) was garrisoned in Crikvenica at the time and consisted of the 153rd Infantry Division "Macerata" in Delnice, 154th Infantry Division "Murge" in Sinj and the XIV Coastal Brigade in Crikvenica.
After Germany invaded Italy following the Italian-Allied armistice in September 1943 the corps was disbanded by the Germans.

==== WWII Commanders ====
- Italo Gariboldi (01.07.1938 – 01.09.1939)
- Carlo Geloso (01.09.1939 – 01.12.1939)
- Carlo Vecchiarelli (01.12.1939 – 09.04.1940)
- Riccardo Balocco (05.06.1940 – 18.02.1942)
- Renato Coturri (18.02.1942 – 09.01.1943)
- Alessandro Gloria (09.01.1943 – 05.05.1943)
- Antonio Scuero (05.05.1943 – 08.09.1943 : POW)

=== Cold War ===
In 1945 the V Territorial Military Command was activated in Padua which at the time controlled only the 5th Alpini Regiment. But already by 1947 the command had grown to include the Infantry Division "Folgore" in Treviso and the Infantry Division "Mantova" in Gorizia. Both divisions were units of the Italian Co-Belligerent Army and had served on the Allied side during the Italian campaign. In 1948 the command was augmented with the Armored Brigade "Ariete" in Pordenone and in 1949 with the Alpine Brigade "Julia" in Cividale del Friuli. The command was tasked with defending the Italian Eastern borders: the Mantova was to defend the city of Gorizia, while the Julia covered the commands left flank in the Carnic Alps. The motorized Folgore was tasked to advance to the Free Territory of Trieste and support the Trieste United States Troops, while the Ariete with its M4 Sherman tanks, M3 Half-tracks and M7 Priests served as the commands mobile reserve. To cover its right flank against enemy amphibious landings the command raised the Lagunari troops in Venice on 15 January 1951.

On 1 May 1952 the V Territorial Military Command was renamed as V Army Corps and as the West-East confrontation became more dire the Ariete tripled in size and became the Armored Division "Ariete" on 1 October 1952. division also exchanged its Sherman tanks for more powerful M26 Pershings. On 30 September the corps 1953 moved to Vittorio Veneto and ceded command of the Julia to the new Carnia-Cadore Troops Command, which covered the V Army Corps left flank.

Over the next years the corps added further units to keep up with the geopolitical situation of the Cold War: the Ariete was further increased and received M47 Patton tanks and M113 armored personnel carriers, as well as one artillery group armed with M44 self-propelled howitzers and one artillery group armed with M110 self-propelled howitzers. The Mantova and Folgore infantry divisions were each increased by one infantry regiment and both received a tank battalion with M47 Patton tanks. In Trieste the 151st Infantry Regiment "Sassari" and the 14th Field Artillery Regiment formed the Trieste Troops Command tasked with defending the city. At the same time the Lagunari regiment in Venice grew to three amphibious battalions and one tank battalion with M47 Patton tanks. In Gorizia on 1 January 1959 the mechanized Cavalry Brigade "Pozzuolo del Friuli" activated with two mechanized, one tank battalion and one self-propelled artillery group, to replace the Mantova, which had moved its headquarters to Udine.

The most significant addition to the corps was the III Missile Brigade. The brigade activated on 1 October 1959 in Vicenza and initially consisted of one missile artillery regiment with two missile groups, each of which was armed with eight Honest John missile launchers. The MGR-1 Honest John was a nuclear-capable surface-to-surface missile intended to destroy the large Warsaw Pact armored formations. By 1963, when the brigades headquarters was moved to Portogruaro, the brigade contained four missile groups and one group with M115 howitzers.

The corps - along with the 3rd Army Corps and 4th Army Corps was part of NATOs Allied Land Forces Southern Europe Command (LANDSOUTH) in Verona. From 1968 it faced the Ninth Army Area of the Yugoslav Ground Forces over the border in the Socialist Republic of Slovenia.

==== 5th Army Corps ====
In 1975 the Italian Army undertook a major reorganisation. The regiment level was abolished and battalions came under direct command of brigades, which combined units from different combat arms. In the same year the spelling of the name of the corps was changed from V Army Corps to 5th Army Corps. Therefore, the 5th Army Corps' new structure at the end of 1975 was as follows:

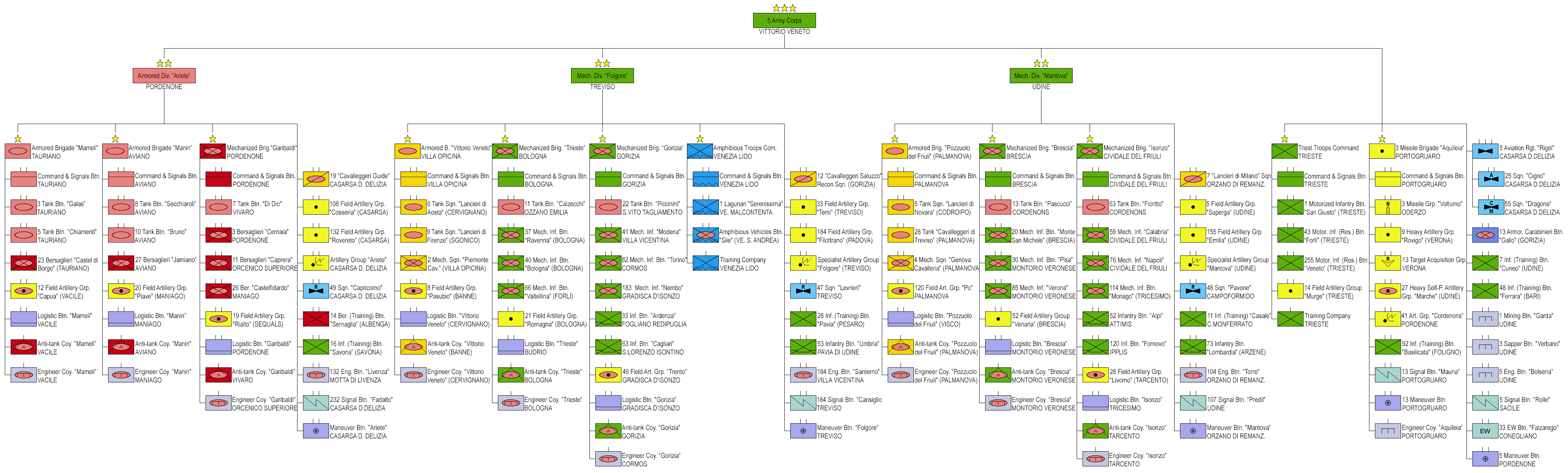
Structure of the 5th Army Corps in 1986 before the divisional level was abolished (click to enlarge)

- 5th Army Corps, in Vittorio Veneto
  - Armored Division "Ariete", in Pordenone
    - 8th Mechanized Brigade "Garibaldi", in Pordenone
    - 32nd Armored Brigade "Mameli", in Tauriano
    - 132nd Armored Brigade "Manin", in Aviano
  - Mechanized Division "Folgore", in Treviso
    - Mechanized Brigade "Gorizia", in Gorizia
    - Mechanized Brigade "Trieste", in Bologna
    - Armored Brigade "Vittorio Veneto", in Villa Opicina
    - Amphibious Troops Command (Lagunari), in Venice-Lido
  - Mechanized Division "Mantova", in Udine
    - Mechanized Brigade "Brescia", in Brescia
    - Mechanized Brigade "Isonzo", in Cividale del Friuli
    - Armored Brigade "Pozzuolo del Friuli", in Palmanova
  - 3rd Missile Brigade "Aquileia", in Portogruaro
  - Trieste Troops Command, in Trieste

In 1976 the entire corps was heavily involved in the rescue and cleanup efforts after the 1976 Friuli earthquake.

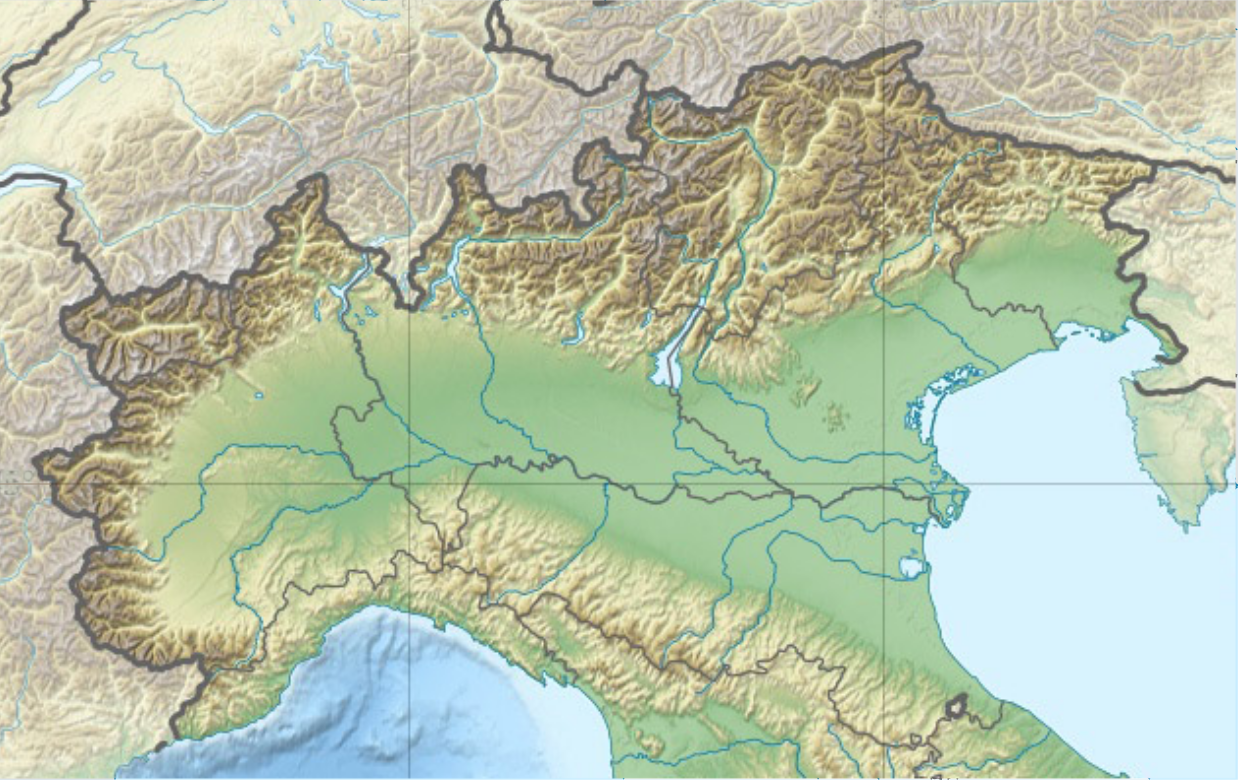
Combat brigades of the 5th Army Corps in 1986

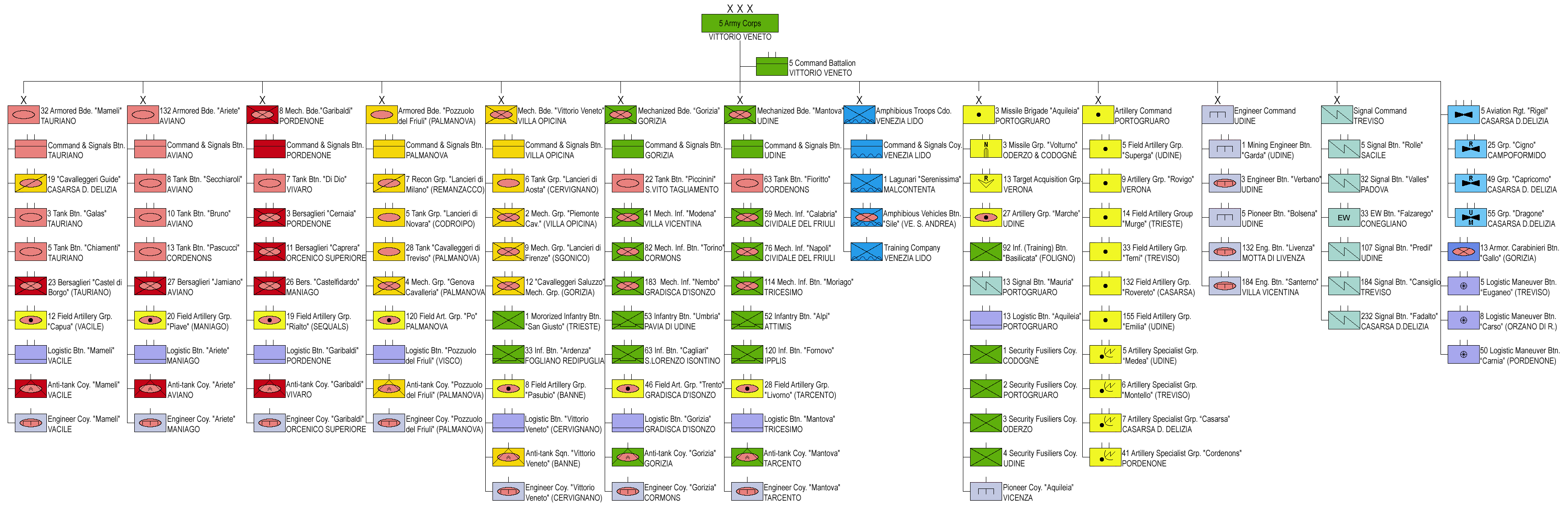
Structure of the 5th Army Corps in 1989 at the End of the Cold War (click to enlarge)

In 1986 the Italian Army abolished the divisional level and realigned its forces to counter a possible Warsaw Pact attack better. The 5th Army Corps was to destroy enemy forces within the region of Friuli-Venezia Giulia, while the 4th Alpine Army Corps covered the V Army Corps' left flank and the 3rd Army Corps was the operational reserve. As two of the V Army Corps' mechanized brigades were based outside its area of operation, the V Corps lost these two brigades to the 3rd Army Corps: the Mechanized Brigade "Brescia" in Brescia and the Mechanized Brigade "Trieste" in Bologna. As the Ariete and Mantova divisions carried historically significant names - the Ariete having fought bravely in the Siege of Tobruk and Battle of Gazala and fought to annihilation in the Second Battle of El Alamein, and the Mantova as one of the divisions that fought in the Italian Co-Belligerent Army to liberate Italy from Nazi-occupation - the army decided to rename the 132nd Armored Brigade "Manin" as 132nd Armored Brigade "Ariete" and the Mechanized Brigade "Isonzo" as Mechanized Brigade "Mantova". Although the Folgore divisions carried and equally significant name the army decided to transfer the traditions of the Folgore division to the existing Paratroopers Brigade "Folgore".

After the reform of 1986 the V Corps was structured as follows:

- 5th Army Corps, in Vittorio Veneto
  - 32nd Armored Brigade "Mameli", in Tauriano
  - 132nd Armored Brigade "Ariete", in Aviano
  - Armored Brigade "Pozzuolo del Friuli", in Palmanova
  - Mechanized Brigade "Vittorio Veneto", in Villa Opicina
  - 8th Mechanized Brigade "Garibaldi", in Pordenone
  - Mechanized Brigade "Gorizia", in Gorizia
  - Mechanized Brigade "Mantova", in Udine
  - 3rd Missile Brigade "Aquileia", in Portogruaro
  - Amphibious Troops Command (Lagunari), in Venice-Lido

Each mechanized brigade fielded about 4,700 men, while the armored brigades fielded about 3,400 men. Together with the corps' support units the entire corps fielded over 60,000 men.

=== After the Cold War ===
With the end of the Cold War the Italian Army began a decade long reduction of its forces. The first brigade to disband was the Mameli on 1 April 1991, followed by the Vittorio Veneto on 31 July 1991. The units subordinated to these brigades were mostly disbanded, with a few units joining other brigades. The Garibaldi completed its move to Caserta in the South of Italy on 1 July 1991 and left the 5th Army Corps on that day. Finally on 1 December 1991 the Aquileia was reduced to 3rd Artillery Regiment Aquileia, which was then disbanded in September 1992. Over the next few years the Trieste Troops Command and the Amphibious Troops Command were disbanded.

In 1997 the army undertook the next big reform process and the 5th Army Corps saw its Gorizia and Mantova brigades disbanded on 30 August 1997, but it received the Mechanized Brigade Centauro from the 3rd Army Corps. On 1 October 1997 the 5th Army Corps changed its name and became the 1st Defence Forces Command (1° Comando Forze di Difesa or COMFOD 1°). The new structure of the corps was:

- COMFOD 1°, in Vittorio Veneto
  - 132nd Armored Brigade "Ariete", in Pordenone
  - Mechanized Brigade "Centauro", in Novara
  - Cavalry Brigade "Pozzuolo del Friuli", in Gorizia
  - 1st Infantry Regiment "San Giusto" (1x training battalion), in Trieste
  - 7th Infantry Regiment "Cuneo" (1x training battalion), in Udine
  - 11th Infantry Regiment "Casale" (1x training battalion), in Casale Monferrato
  - 3rd Engineer Regiment (1x battalion), in Udine
  - 7th Signal Regiment (1x battalion), in Sacile

On 1 December 2000 the Projection Forces Command (COMFOP) ceded two of its brigades - the Paratroopers Brigade "Folgore" and Airmobile Brigade "Friuli" to the 1st Defence Forces Command. In 2002 the command changed composition for the last time: the Centauro was disbanded on 5 October 2002 and all support units were either disbanded or transferred to other commands. However, in the same year the command began to build up a deployable division-level headquarters. Said headquarters became operational in October 2005 and was given the name Division Command "Mantova".

== Today ==
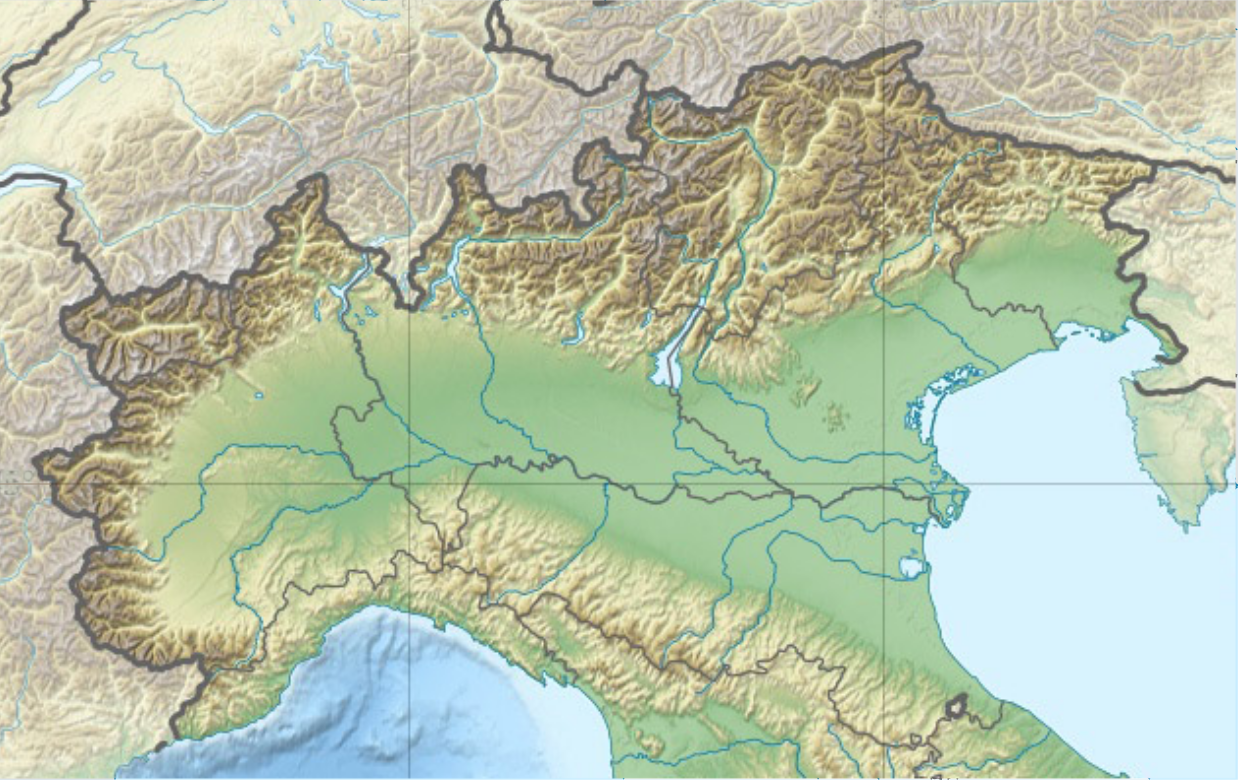
COMFOD 1 unit locations 2013

Before being disbanded the 1st Defence Forces Command was located in the northern Italian City of Vittorio Veneto and consisted of the following units:

- Division Command "Mantova" (without fixed units), in Vittorio Veneto
- 132nd Armored Brigade "Ariete", in Pordenone
- Cavalry Brigade "Pozzuolo del Friuli", in Gorizia
- Paratroopers Brigade "Folgore", in Livorno
- Airmobile Brigade "Friuli", in Bologna
