= Trieste Troops Command =

Comando Truppe di Trieste
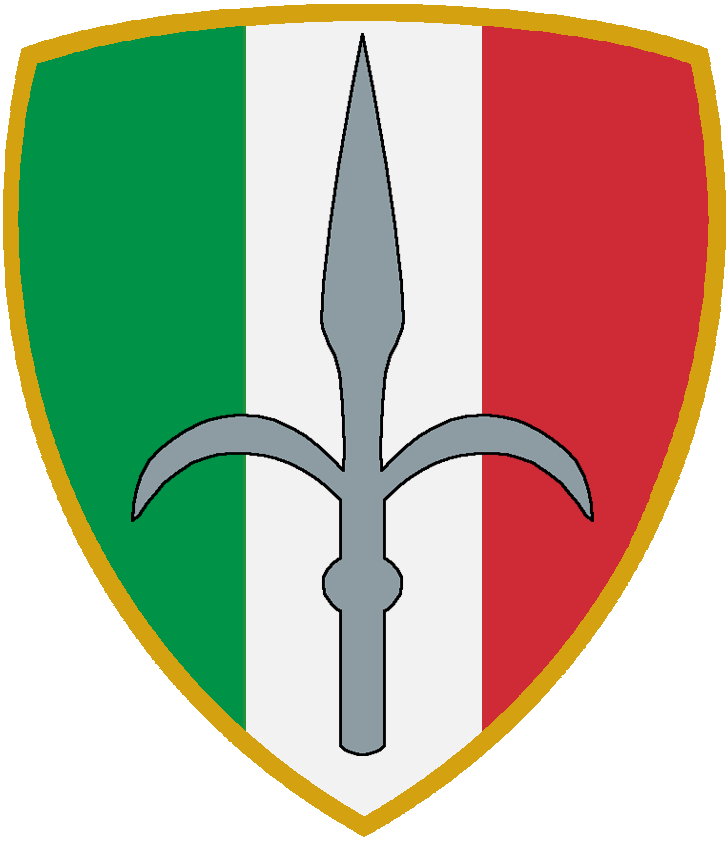
- Coat of Arms of the Trieste Troops Command
- Active: 26 October 1954 - 1 October 1986
- Country: Italy
- Branch: Italian Army
- Part of: 5th Army Corps
- Garrison/HQ: Trieste

The Trieste Troops Command was an Italian Army brigade-sized command located in the city of the Trieste and tasked with the defense of the city in case of a Yugoslav-Italian war.

== History ==
=== Origins ===
After World War II the city of Trieste and the surrounding territory became the Free Territory of Trieste under direct responsibility of the United Nations Security Council. The territory was split into the Yugoslav-administered Zone B in the South and the British-American-administered Zone A in the north, which included the city of Trieste. The Allied Military Government administered Zone A, which was divided into peacekeeping and law enforcement sectors protected by 5,000 American troops (Trieste United States Troops – TRUST) and 5,000 British troops (British Element Trieste Force – BETFOR).

In 1953 Britain and the United States stated their intention to leave Zone A and hand its administration over to Italy. Subsequent negotiations led to the signing of the London Memorandum on 5 October 1954 by the foreign ministers of the United States, United Kingdom, Italy and Yugoslavia. The Memorandum gave Zone A with Trieste to Italy for an ordinary civil administration, and Zone B, which had already had a communist government since 1947, to Yugoslavia.

American and British forces immediately began to withdraw from Zone A and on 26 October 1954 the last TRUST commander, Major General John A. Dabney handed over control of Zone A to the Italian 82nd Infantry Regiment "Torino" which was transferred from its base in Forlì to Trieste and formed the core of the provisional Grouping "T".

On 15 September 1955 the Grouping "T" was reduced to 22nd Zonal Military Command and the 82nd Infantry Regiment "Torino" entered the Infantry Division "Folgore", which was given the task to defend the Yugoslav-Italian border between Gorizia and Trieste. On 1 April 1962 the 82nd Infantry Regiment "Torino" moved to Gorizia and was replaced in Trieste by the 151st Infantry Regiment "Sassari".

=== Military Command Trieste ===
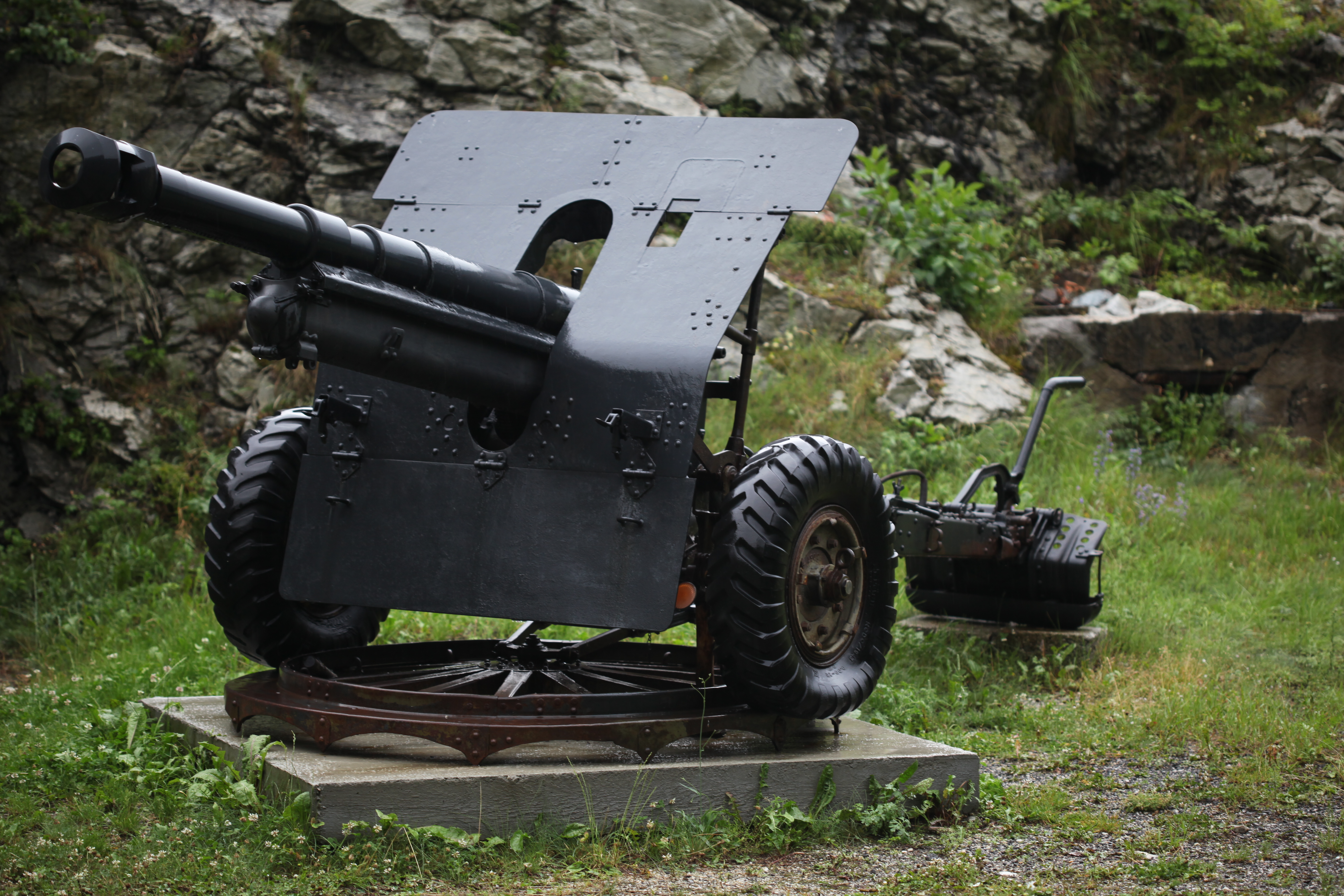
A 105/22 mod. 14/61 105 mm towed howitzer as used by the 14th Field Artillery Regiment

On 1 September 1962 151st Infantry Regiment "Sassari" and the 14th Field Artillery Regiment entered the newly raised Military Command Trieste, which was tasked with the defence of the city. The area between the city and the Timavo river to the North was to be defended by the Cavalry Brigade "Pozzuolo del Friuli"'s Regiment "Piemonte Cavalleria" (2nd), which fielded two armored squadrons groups equipped with a mix of tanks and armored personnel carriers in Villa Opicina and Sgonico. The Piemonte Cavalleria was supported by the II Self-propelled Field Artillery Group in Banne, which was part of the 8th Self-propelled Field Artillery Regiment of the "Pozzuolo del Friuli" brigade. After its activation the Military Command Trieste came under the 5th Army Corps and consisted of the following units:

- Military Command Trieste, in Trieste
  - 151st Infantry Regiment "Sassari", in Trieste
    - Command Company, in Trieste
    - I Battalion, in Trieste
    - II Battalion, in Trieste
    - III Battalion, in Trieste
    - Anti-tank Company, in Trieste
  - 14th Field Artillery Regiment, in Trieste (Duca delle Puglie barracks)
    - Command Battery, in Trieste
    - I Field Artillery Group, in Trieste, with 105/22 mod. 14/61 105 mm towed howitzers
    - II Field Artillery Group, in Muggia, with 105/22 mod. 14/61 105 mm towed howitzers
  - Recruits Training Company, in Trieste
  - Signal Platoon, in Trieste
  - Engineer Platoon, in Trieste
  - Light Aviation Section, in Prosecco

On 1 December 1968 the command was renamed Trieste Troops Command.

=== 1975 reform ===
In 1975 the Italian army undertook a major reform of its forces and structure: the regimental level was abolished and battalions came under direct command of newly created multi-arms brigades. At the same time the divisions were reorganized and their areas of responsibility were redefined. On 30 September 1975 the 151st Infantry Regiment "Sassari" was disbanded and its II and III battalion put into reserve status, while the I Battalion was renamed as 1st Motorized Infantry Battalion "San Giusto". Likewise, the 14th Field Artillery Regiment and the II Field Artillery Group were disbanded and the I Field Artillery Group renamed 14th Field Artillery Group "Murge". At the same time the artillery group was equipped with the more powerful and more modern M114 towed howitzers. After the reform the Trieste Troops Command consisted of the following units:

- Trieste Military Command, in Trieste
  - Command and Services Platoon, in Trieste
  - 1st Motorized Infantry Battalion "San Giusto", in Trieste (includes one mechanized company with M113 APCs)
  - 43rd Motorized Infantry Battalion "Forlì" (Reserve), in Trieste
  - 255th Motorized Infantry Battalion "Veneto" (Reserve), in Trieste
  - 14th Field Artillery Group "Murge", in Trieste (M114 155 mm towed howitzers)
  - Engineer Platoon, in Trieste
  - Signal Platoon, in Trieste
  - Provisions Supply Platoon, in Trieste
  - Logistics Base, in Muggia

The command stored and maintained the materiel for the 43rd Motorized Infantry Battalion "Forlì" and 255th Motorized Infantry Battalion "Veneto", which in case of war would have been activated and filled with reservists from Trieste and the surrounding area. During the same reform the Cavalry Brigade "Pozzuolo del Friuli" was split and the Regiment "Piemonte Cavalleria" (2nd) was used to form the new Armored Brigade "Vittorio Veneto", which took over the defense of the area between Trieste and the Timavo river.

=== 1986 reform ===
In 1986 the Italian Army abolished the divisional level and the Trieste Troops Command, headed at the time by a division general, was disbanded on 1 October 1986. The 1st Motorized Infantry Battalion "San Giusto" was transferred to the Mechanized Brigade "Vittorio Veneto", and the 14th Field Artillery Group "Murge" to the Artillery Command of the 5th Army Corps. The remaining units, including the two reserve battalions, were disbanded.
