= Renato Coturri =

Italian general

- Born: 27 February 1883; Genoa, Kingdom of Italy
- Died: 6 May 1951 (aged 68); Genoa, Italy
- Military career
- Allegiance: Kingdom of Italy; Italian Social Republic
- Branch: Royal Italian Army; National Republican Army
- Service years: 1909–1945
- Rank: Lieutenant General
- Commands: 74th Infantry Regiment "Lombardia" "Monviso" Infantry Brigade; 33rd Infantry Division Acqui; 54th Infantry Division Napoli; XXX Army Corps; V Army Corps; Territorial Defense of Treviso
- Conflicts: Italo-Turkish War; World War I; Battles of the Isonzo; Battle of Caporetto; Second Battle of the Piave River; World War II; Italian occupation of Yugoslavia
- Awards: Silver Medal of Military Valor; Bronze Medal of Military Valor (three times); Order of the Crown of Italy; Order of Saints Maurice and Lazarus

Renato Coturri (27 February 1883 – 6 May 1951) was an Italian general during World War II.

== Early life and World War I ==
Renato Coturri was born in Genoa on 27 February 1883, the son of Enrico Coturri. After enlisting in the Royal Italian Army, in 1901 he entered enrolled at the Royal Military Academy of Infantry and Cavalry of Modena, graduating on 5 September 1904 with the rank of infantry second lieutenant. He participated in the Italo-Turkish War with the rank of captain, and then in World War I as a major, commanding the 2nd Battalion of the 3rd Infantry Regiment, Piedmont Infantry Brigade, from May 1916 to July 1917, earning a Bronze Medal of Military Valor for courage displayed in the fighting near Tolmin in August 1915. He was later promoted to lieutenant colonel; during the retreat that followed the battle of Caporetto in late October 1917 he gathered straggles and assumed command of units that had been cut off, leading them to the Italian lines, for which he was awarded a Silver Medal of Military Valor. He later earned another bronze medal in June 1918, during the Second Battle of the Piave River.

== Interwar period ==
After serving at the General Staff, he was promoted to colonel on 2 January 1928, taking command of the 74th Infantry Regiment "Lombardia" in Pola in 1934-1935. On 1 June 1936 he was promoted to brigadier general, becoming commander of the "Monviso" Infantry Brigade and then deputy commander of the 4th Infantry Division "Monviso", with headquarters in Cuneo. From September 1937 to September 1938 he was in service at the command of the Milan Army Corps, and from September to December of the same year he was in command of the Milan Corps of the Frontier Guard; in December 1938 he assumed command of the 33rd Infantry Division Acqui. On 1 April 1939 he was promoted to major general and in May he was given command of the 54th Infantry Division Napoli, based in Ragusa, a post he was holding when the Kingdom of Italy entered World War II, on 10 June 1940.

== World War II ==
From 1 January 1942, after promotion to lieutenant general, he first assumed command of the XXX Army Corps in Padua and then, from the following 18 February, of the V Army Corps in Sušak, replacing General Riccardo Balocco. During his period in command of the Fifth Corps Coturri strictly applied the racial laws of 1938, deporting back to the Independent State of Croatia the Jews who sought refuge in Italian-controlled territory. On 31 July 1942 he participated in a summit with the highest Italian military commands, held in Padua in the presence of Mussolini, Chief of the General Staff Ugo Cavallero, Army Chief of Staff Vittorio Ambrosio, General Mario Roatta (commander of the 2nd Army) and General Mario Robotti (commander of the XI Army Corps), aimed at discussing how to counter partisan activity in the province of Ljubljana.

From 9 January 1943 he was made available to the Ministry of War for special assignments, and from the following 27 February he was placed in command of the Territorial Defense of Treviso. After the proclamation of the armistice of Cassibile on 8 September 1943, he refused to hand over weapons to the local anti-Fascists, declined to organize a resistance and fled the city on 10 September, being then arrested by the Germans and taken to Oflag 64/Z in Schokken, Poland. He was released after joining the Italian Social Republic, and was tasked with recruiting volunteers for the National Republican Army from among the Italian military internees held in POW camps in Germany. His activity met with little success, as most IMIs refused to swear allegiance to the Fascist puppet state.

== Later life ==
After the war Coturri was subjected to an "epuration" procedure, being expelled from the Army with the loss of his rank and decorations. He was also is wanted by Yugoslavia for war crimes, but was never extradited. He died on 6 May 1951.
