= Riccardo Balocco =

Italian general

Riccardo Balocco (30 March 1883 – 6 October 1964) was a general in the Royal Italian Army that commanded the V Corps during the World War II Axis invasion of Yugoslavia in April 1941.

== Biography ==
On 1 July 1937, he became a division general and assumed command of the 12th Infantry Division "Sassari" between 9 September 1937 and 5 June 1940. He then became commander of the V Corps and participated in the invasion of Yugoslavia in April 1941, conquering and later occupying Croatia. On 18 February 1942, he was put on non-active.

== Bibliography ==
- Nafziger, George (1997). "Italian 2nd & 9th Army – Invasion of Yugoslavia – 5 April 1941" (PDF). Combined Arms Research Library Digital Library. Archived from the original (PDF) on 22 March 2014.
