= Army Group East (Italy) =

Army group of Royal Italian Army in World War II

Army Group East (Italian: Gruppo d'Armate Est) was an Army Group of the Royal Italian Army in World War II.

It was established on 1 September 1939 with headquarters in Rome, under the command of Marshal of Italy Rodolfo Graziani, with the task of directing future war operations in northeastern Italy. When Graziani was appointed Chief of Staff of the Royal Italian Army on 3 November 1939, he left the command of Army Group East, being replaced by General Camillo Grossi; at the same time the headquarters of the Army Group were moved to Cervignano del Friuli. When Italy entered World War II, on 10 June 1940, Army Group East was composed of the Second Army (General Vittorio Ambrosio), deployed along the border with Yugoslavia, of the Army of the Po (General Mario Vercellino) stationed in Lombardy, and of the Eighth Army (General Adalberto of Savoy-Genova), stationed between Veneto and Romagna. One month after the start of the war, however, the Army Group was dissolved without having participated in war operations.

Army Group East was reformed on 15 May 1943 as a unified commands of all Italian forces in the Balkans, tasked with both repressing the local resistance movements and repelling anticipated Allied landings. General Ezio Rosi was appointed as its commander; headquarters were located in Tirana, Albania. The Army Group was now composed of the Second Army (General Mario Robotti) in Dalmatia and Montenegro, of the Eleventh Army (General Carlo Vecchiarelli) in Greece, and of the Ninth Army (General Lorenzo Dalmazzo) in Albania, as well as of the Armed Forces Command of the Aegean (Admiral Inigo Campioni, with headquarters in Rhodes). In August 1943 the Eleventh Army was transferred to the German Army Group E.

Army Group East ceased to exist in September 1943, as a result of the Armistice of Cassibile. During Operation Achse, General Rosi and his entire command were captured by German troops on 11 September at their headquarters in Tirana, while most Italian troops in the Balkans were disarmed and sent to Germany as Italian military internees. Attempts of resistance were brutally crushed by the Germans (such as in the massacre of the Acqui Division); several thousands Italian soldiers evaded capture and managed to cross the Adriatic Sea and reach Italy, or joined the Yugoslav, Greek and Albanian partisans.
