= Sogno (surname) =

Sogno is a surname, and may refer to:

- Cristiana Sogno (born 1969), American classicist
- Edgardo Sogno (1915–2000), Italian diplomat and partisan
- Vittorio Sogno (1885–1971), Italian general
