= Abyssinia Crisis =

International crisis in 1935

A map of the Ethiopian Empire, the land at the centre of the crisis, in 1930.

The Abyssinia Crisis, (Note: Amharic: አቢሲኒያ ቀውስ, romanized: ābīsīnīya k’ewisi; Italian: La crisi abissina) also known in Italy as the Walwal incident, (Note: Italian: Incidente di Ual Ual; also variously transliterated as Welwel or Walwaal) was an international crisis in 1935 that originated in a dispute over the town of Walwal, which then turned into a conflict between the Kingdom of Italy and the Ethiopian Empire (then commonly known as "Abyssinia"). The League of Nations ruled against Italy and voted for economic sanctions, but they were never fully applied. Italy ignored the sanctions, quit the League and ultimately annexed and occupied Abyssinia after it had won the Second Italo-Ethiopian War. The crisis is generally regarded as having discredited the League.

== Walwal incident ==
The Italo–Ethiopian Treaty of 1928 stated that the border between Italian Somaliland and Ethiopia was 21 leagues from and parallel to the Banaadir coast (approximately 118.3 km [73.5 mi]). In 1930, Italy built a fort at the Walwal oasis in the eastern Ogaden, well beyond the 21-league limit. The fort was in a boundary zone between the nations, which was not well defined, and is now about 130 km (81 mi) inside Ethiopia.

On 29 September 1934, Italy and Abyssinia released a joint statement renouncing any aggression against each other.

On 22 November 1934, a force of 1,000 Ethiopian militia with three fitaurari (Ethiopian military-political commanders) arrived near Walwal and formally asked the Dubats garrison stationed there (comprising about 60 soldiers) to withdraw from the area. The Somali NCO leading the garrison refused to withdraw and alerted Captain Cimmaruta, the commander of the garrison of Uarder, 20 kilometres (12 mi) away, to what had happened.

The next day, in the course of surveying the border between British Somaliland and Ethiopia, an Anglo–Ethiopian boundary commission arrived at Walwal. The commission was confronted by a newly-arrived Italian force. The British members of the boundary commission protested but withdrew to avoid an international incident. The Ethiopian members of the boundary commission, however, stayed at Walwal.

From the 5th of December to the 7th, for reasons which have never been clearly determined, there was a skirmish between the garrison of Somalis, who were in Italian service, and a force of armed Ethiopians. According to the Italians, the Ethiopians attacked the Somalis with rifle and machine-gun fire. According to the Ethiopians, the Italians attacked them and were supported by two tanks and three aircraft. In the end, approximately 107 Ethiopians (Note: According to Mockler, 107 Ethiopians were killed and 40 wounded.) and 50 Italians and Somalis were killed. (Note: According to Time magazine, 110 Ethiopians were killed and 30 Italians were killed.)

Neither side did anything to avoid confrontation; the Ethiopians repeatedly menaced the Italian garrison with the threat of an armed attack, and the Italians sent two planes over the Ethiopian camp. One of them fired a short machine-gun burst, which no one on the ground noticed, after the pilot saw Captain Cimmaruta in the midst of the Ethiopians and thought that he had been taken prisoner by them.

== International response and subsequent actions ==
"Treaties or scraps of paper?"

To the Editor of The Daily Telegraph

Sir,

Last Saturday's leading article on "Abyssinia: Our Duty" is welcome indeed after the advice liberally offered to the Emperor of Abyssinia by some sections of the English Press, urging him to submit to Italy, not because the Italian blackmail is just, but because it would be so inconvenient for ourselves if he resisted.

We might be called on to do more than lip-service to the League; and how extravagant would that be!

Twenty-one years ago, when the consequences of honouring our obligations were far more menacing, we were indignant enough at the suggestion that treaties were, after all, only "scraps of paper." But geography plays strange tricks with justice. Italy is breaking at least three solemn pledges in her aggression on a fellow member of the League – the very type of aggression that the League was created to prevent: but many of us do not find it matters very much. The League has not yet called on us; but there are already plenty of voices busy finding pretexts for us to shuffle out of the whole thing.

It is not our duty to defend Abyssinia single-handed – no-one has suggested it; but it is our duty, if covenants mean anything whatsoever, to oppose this piece of brigandage at Geneva, and after. It is our duty to be concerting with whatever Powers retain some decency, particularly the United States, what measures may be needed.

Europe has at its disposal sanctions that Italy could not defy, provided we have the courage to use them. But instead of that the English Press, with a few honourable exceptions, has been taken up with nauseating discussion of our own interests. Later on, one gathers, we shall be very firm with Italy about the water of Lake Tana. Meanwhile, Ethiopian blood is a cheaper commodity.

If this is to be the way of our world, why make treaties at all? Let us at least have the courage of our cynicism. Let us have done with covenants, since they no longer serve to deceive anybody. Let us have done with the League, since "collective security" means simply the security of those strong enough to be secure. And then, if we perish in the chaos for which the world is heading, it will at least be without having canted to our last breath.

This jungle-law may have ruled between nations in the past; the time is rapidly approaching when either it ends or else the world. If the League cannot enforce one law for weak and strong, black and white, sooner or later we are finished. And if we flinch every time a test arises, we shall have deserved it.

[From a letter by F. L. Lucas of King's College, Cambridge, British anti-appeasement campaigner, to The Daily Telegraph, 25 July 1935]

On 6 December 1934, Emperor Haile Selassie of Ethiopia protested the Italian aggression at Walwal. On 8 December, Italy demanded an apology for Ethiopian aggression, and on 11 December, it followed up that demand with another for financial and strategic compensation.

On 3 January 1935, Ethiopia appealed to the League of Nations for arbitration of the dispute arising from the Walwal incident. However, the League's response was inconclusive. A subsequent analysis by an arbitration committee of the League of Nations absolved both parties of any culpability from all events.

Shortly after Ethiopia's initial appeal, French Minister of Foreign Affairs Pierre Laval and British Foreign Secretary Samuel Hoare met the Italian dictator, Benito Mussolini, in Rome.

On 7 January 1935, a meeting between Laval and Mussolini resulted in the Franco-Italian Agreement, which gave Italy parts of French Somaliland (now Djibouti), redefined the official status of Italians in French-held Tunisia and essentially gave Italy a free hand in dealing with Ethiopia. In exchange, France hoped for Italian support against Germany.

On 25 January, five Italian askaris were killed by Ethiopian forces near Walwal.

On 10 February 1935, Mussolini mobilised two divisions. On 23 February, Mussolini began to send large numbers of troops to Eritrea and Italian Somaliland, the Italian colonies that bordered Ethiopia to the northeast and the southeast respectively. There was little international protest in response to the military build-up.

On 8 March, Ethiopia again requested arbitration and noted the Italian military build-up. Three days later, Italy and Ethiopia agreed on a neutral zone in the Ogaden. On 17 March, in response to the continued Italian build-up, Ethiopia again appealed to the League for help. On 22 March, the Italians yielded to pressure from the League to submit to arbitration on the dispute arising from the Walwal incident but continued to mobilise its troops in the region. On 11 May, Ethiopia again protested against the ongoing Italian mobilisation.

Between 20 and 21 May, the League held a special session to discuss the crisis in Ethiopia. On 25 May, a League council resolved that it would meet if no fifth arbitrator had been selected by 25 June or if a settlement had not been reached by 25 August. On 19 June, Ethiopia requested neutral observers.

From 23 to 24 June, the United Kingdom tried to quell the crisis by sending Under-Secretary of State for Foreign Affairs Anthony Eden to try to broker a peace agreement. The attempt was unsuccessful, and it became clear that Mussolini was intent on conquest. On 25 July, the United Kingdom imposed an embargo on arms sales to both Italy and Ethiopia. Many historians believe that the embargo was a response to Italy's decree that it would view arms sales to Ethiopia as an act of unfriendliness toward Italy, but other observers believe that the United Kingdom was protecting its economic interests in East Africa. The United Kingdom also cleared its warships from the Mediterranean Sea, which allowed Italy further unhindered access to East Africa.

On 25 June, Italian and Ethiopian officials met in The Hague to discuss arbitration. By 9 July, the discussions had failed.

On 26 July, the League confirmed that no fifth member of the arbitration panel had been selected. On 3 August, the League prevented arbitration talks from being held on the sovereignty of Walwal.

On 12 August, Ethiopia pleaded for the arms embargo to be lifted. On 16 August, France and the United Kingdom offered Italy large concessions in Ethiopia to try to avert war, but Italy rejected the offers. On 22 August, the United Kingdom reaffirmed its commitment to the arms embargo.

On 4 September, the League met again and exonerated Italy and Ethiopia of any culpability in the Walwal incident on the ground that each nation had believed Walwal to be in its own territorial borders. On 10 September, Laval, Eden and even Hoare agreed on limitations to sanctions against Italy.

On 25 September, Ethiopia again asked for neutral observers.

On 27 September, the British Parliament supported the initiative of Konni Zilliacus and unanimously authorised the imposition of sanctions against Italy if it continued its policy towards Ethiopia.

On 28 September, Ethiopia began to mobilize its large but poorly-equipped army.

On 7 November, the Irish Free State passed the League of Nations Bill, which placed sanctions on Italy.

The League of Nations had described Ethiopia as follows:

At places where there is not a single Italian national, a consul establishes himself in an area known as consular territory with a guard of about ninety men, for whom he claims jurisdictional immunity. This is an obvious abuse of consular privileges. The abuse is all the greater that the consul's duties, apart from the supplying of information of a military character, take the form of assembling stocks of arms, which constitute a threat to the peace of the country, whether from the internal or the international point of view.

== War and occupation ==
On 3 October 1935, shortly after the League had exonerated both parties in the Walwal incident, Italian armed forces from Eritrea invaded Ethiopia without a declaration of war, which prompted Ethiopia to declare war on Italy and thus started the Second Italo–Ethiopian War.

On 7 October in what would come to be known as the "Riddell Incident", the League of Nations declared Italy to be the aggressor and started the slow process of imposing economic sanctions on Italy. The sanctions were limited, however, since they did not prohibit the provision of several vital materials, such as oil, and were not carried out by all members of the League. The Canadian delegate to the League, Walter Alexander Riddell, suggested for the League to add steel and oil to the sanctions, which caused the world press to speak of the "Canadian initiative" and of the bold decision taken by Canadian Prime Minister William Lyon Mackenzie King in pressing for oil sanctions against Italy. Riddell, who had acted on his own, was promptly disavowed by Mackenzie King, who characteristically announced that it was absolutely untrue that he made a decision, he had made no decision about anything and he had never heard of the "Canadian initiative" in Geneva. Mackenzie King's opposition to Riddell's "Canadian initiative" was motivated by domestic politics since Mussolini was widely admired in Catholic Quebec, especially by its nationalistic intelligentsia, and Mackenzie King's Liberal Party had just won the majority of the seats in Quebec in the 1935 election. Mackenzie King was terrified of the possibility of Canada taking the lead in imposing oil sanctions against Italy would cause the Liberals to lose their seats in Quebec in the next election. Thus, no more was heard of the "Canadian initiative".

The United States, which was generally indifferent to the League's weak sanctions, increased its exports to Italy, and the United Kingdom and France did not take any serious action against Italy, such as blocking Italian access to the Suez Canal. Even Italy's use of chemical weapons and other actions that violated international norms did little to change the League's passive approach to the situation.

In late December 1935, Hoare of the United Kingdom and Laval of France proposed the secret Hoare-Laval Pact, which would have ended the war but allowed Italy to control large areas of Ethiopia. Mussolini agreed to consider the plan to buy time for fear of oil sanctions against Italy, but he had no intention of accepting it. The plan caused an outcry and heavy public criticism in the United Kingdom and France when the plan was leaked to the media. Hoare and Laval were accused of betraying the Abyssinians, and both resigned. The pact was dropped, but the perception spread that the United Kingdom and France were not serious about the League's principles. The war continued, and Mussolini turned to the German dictator, Adolf Hitler, for an alliance.

In March 1936, Hitler marched troops into the Rhineland, which had been prohibited by the Treaty of Versailles. The French were now so desperate to get Italian support against German aggression directly on their border that they would not take any further action with sanctions. Since France was prepared to give Abyssinia to Mussolini, his troops were able to continue their war relatively unchallenged by the rest of Europe.

Haile Selassie was forced into exile on 2 May. All of the sanctions that had been put in place by the League were dropped after the Italian capture of the Ethiopian capital, Addis Ababa, on 5 May 1936. Ethiopia was then merged with the other Italian colonies to become Italian East Africa (Africa Orientale Italiana, or AOI).

Ethiopia never officially surrendered. It pleaded for help from foreign nations; Haile Selassie, on 7 June 1936, addressed the League of Nations. As a result, six nations did not recognize Italy's occupation in 1937: China, New Zealand, the Soviet Union, Spain, Mexico and the United States. Italian control of Ethiopia was never total because of continued guerrilla activity, which the British would later use to their advantage during World War II.

League of Nations sanctions on Italy were lifted on 15 July 1936. Observers described the sanctions as a failure. The sanctions had two purposes: (1) to uphold the Covenant and uphold collective security, and (2) pressure Italy into settling the conflict. However, the sanctions "were not very effective: Italy changed its economic and military orientation towards Germany, and the authoritarian regime became momentarily more popular. Moreover, the League became weaker as a result, crippling its ability to address future crises."

== Aftermath ==
The end of the AOI came quickly during World War II. In early 1941, as part of the East African Campaign, Allied forces launched offensive actions against the isolated Italian colony. On 5 May 1941, exactly five years after the Italians had captured his capital, Emperor Haile Selassie entered Addis Ababa.

There were also major impacts on the League of Nations:

- The Hoare-Laval Pact showed distrust of Britain and France toward the League.
- Hitler began reversing the Treaty of Versailles, such as by the Rhineland remilitarisation.
- Britain and France looked weaker still as seen by Germany, Italy and the United States.

== See also ==
- Timeline of the Second Italo–Abyssinian War
- Italo–Ethiopian Treaty of 1928
- Kellogg-Briand Pact of 1929
- Munich Crisis of 1938
- Second Italo–Abyssinian War
- Freedom of the press in the Kingdom of Italy

== Notes ==
Footnotes

Citations
