= Italo Gariboldi =

Italian military office (1879–1970)

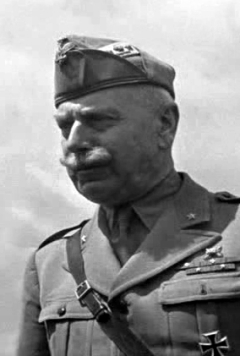

Governor-General of Italian Libya
- In office 25 March 1941 – 19 July 1941
- Monarch: Victor Emmanuel III
- Prime Minister: Benito Mussolini
- Preceded by: Rodolfo Graziani
- Succeeded by: Ettore Bastico

Personal details
- Born: 20 April 1879 Lodi, Kingdom of Italy
- Died: 3 February 1970 (aged 90) Rome, Lazio, Italy
- Awards: Knight's Cross of the Iron Cross

Military service
- Allegiance: Kingdom of Italy
- Branch/service: Royal Italian Army
- Years of service: 1898–1943
- Rank: General
- Commands: 30 Infantry Division Sabauda; V Corps; Tenth Army; Italian Army in Russia
- Battles/wars: World War I; Second Italo-Ethiopian War; World War II; North African campaign; Eastern Front; Battle of Stalingrad

Italo Gariboldi (20 April 1879 – 3 February 1970) was an Italian senior officer in the Royal Army (Regio Esercito) before and during World War II. He was awarded the Knight's Cross of the Iron Cross by German dictator Adolf Hitler for his leadership of Italian forces in the Battle of Stalingrad.

== Early life and career ==
Gariboldi was born in Lodi, Lombardy.

From the end of World War I and through the interwar Period, Gariboldi rose in the ranks and held various staff, regimental and brigade level commands.

== Abyssinia ==
In 1935, Gariboldi commanded the 30th Infantry Division "Sabauda" on the northern front during the Second Italo-Abyssinian War. His division was part of the I Corps based in Italian Eritrea. After Italy defeated Ethiopia (Abyssinia) in May 1936, Eritrea, Abyssinia, and Italian Somaliland were joined to form the colony of Italian East Africa on 1 June 1936.

== North Africa ==
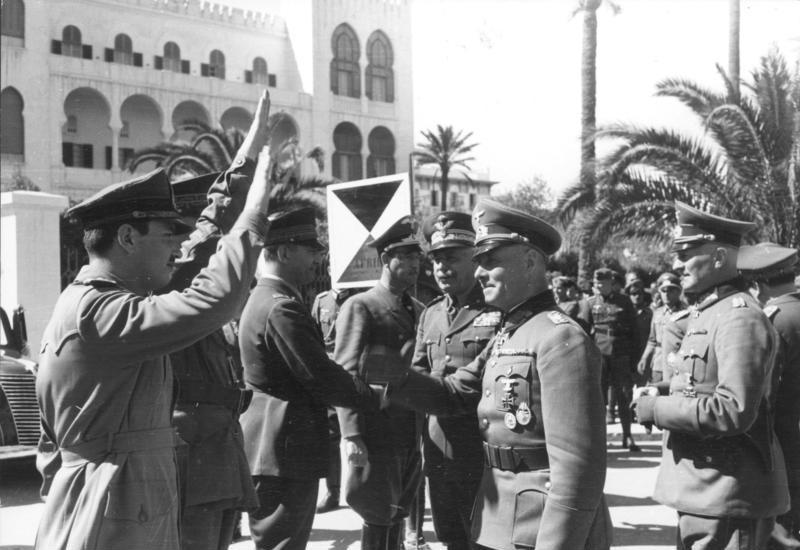
General Rommel with Governor-General Gariboldi (on Rommel's right), Libya 1941

From 1939 to 1941, Gariboldi served as an army commander in Marshal Italo Balbo's "Supreme Command – North Africa". When Italy declared war in June 1940, Gariboldi commanded the Italian Fifth Army stationed on the border with French Tunisia. He ultimately commanded both armies located in Libya. After the Battle of France ended, the Fifth Army became a source of men, parts and supply for the Italian Tenth Army on the border with Egypt.

In December 1940, when the British launched Operation Compass, Gariboldi was in temporary command of the Tenth Army because General Mario Berti was on sick leave. Ultimately, he was given command of the Tenth Army after it had been virtually destroyed, and Berti's replacement, General Giuseppe Tellera, had been killed in action.

On 25 March 1941, Gariboldi was promoted to Governor-General of Libya and replaced Marshal Rodolfo Graziani. By 19 July, Gariboldi himself was relieved because of his alleged lack of cooperation with Rommel. General Ettore Bastico took his place.

== Russia ==
From 1942 to 1943, Gariboldi commanded the Italian Army in Russia (Armata Italiana in Russia, or ARMIR, or Italian 8th Army). He was in command of the Italian Army in Russia during the destruction of that army during the Battle of Stalingrad.

== Italy ==
In 1943, Gariboldi was in Italy when King Victor Emmanuel III and Marshal Pietro Badoglio ousted the dictator, Benito Mussolini, and then signed an armistice with the Allies. Like many other members of the Italian military, Gariboldi was made a prisoner of war (POW) by the Germans. In 1944, he was sentenced to 10 years in prison as a traitor. Later in 1944, Gariboldi was released from prison by the Allies.

== Death and legacy ==
Gariboldi died in Rome in 1970.

His son, Mario Gariboldi, followed his father in a military career.

== Military offices held ==
- Chief of Staff of the 77th Division – 1919
- Commanding Officer of the 26th Regiment – 1926
- Commanding Officer of the 5th Brigade – 1931
- Commander of the 30th Infantry Division "Sabauda,", Ethiopia – 1935 to 1936
- Commander of the V Corps – 1938 to 1939
- Commander of the 5th Army, Tripolitania – 1939 to 1941
- Commander of the 10th Army, Cyrenaica – 1941
- Governor-General of Italian Libya – 1941
- Commander of Italian Army in Russia, southern Russia – 1942 to 1943

== See also ==
- Italian participation in the Eastern Front
- Second Italo-Abyssinian War

Military offices
Preceded by Rodolfo Graziani	Commander-in-Chief of Italian North Africa and Governor-General of Italian Libya; 25 March 1941—19 July 1941	Succeeded by Ettore Bastico
