= Vittorio Sogno =

Italian general

- Born: 24 July 1885; Spoleto, Kingdom of Italy
- Died: 1971 (aged 86); Spoleto, Italy
- Military career
- Allegiance: Kingdom of Italy
- Branch: Royal Italian Army
- Rank: Lieutenant General
- Commands: 11th Engineer Regiment; 20th Infantry Division "Friuli"; VII Army Corps; XVII Army Corps; XXX Army Corps; II Army Corps
- Conflicts: Italo-Turkish War; World War I; Second Italo-Ethiopian War; World War II; Tunisian campaign
- Awards: Order of Saints Maurice and Lazarus; Order of the Crown of Italy; Army Distinguished Service Medal

Vittorio Sogno (Spoleto, 24 July 1885 – 1971) was an Italian general during World War II.

== Biography ==
He was born in Spoleto on 24 July 1885. After attending the Royal Academy of Artillery and Engineers in Turin, he graduated with the rank of second lieutenant of the Engineers in 1904, assigned to the 3rd Engineers Regiment. In 1912 he was transferred to the 2nd Engineer Regiment and participated in the Italian-Turkish war and in the First World War as a staff officer, assigned to the command of the First Corps of Turin. On 7 October 1917 he was promoted to lieutenant colonel and later made section head of the central staff until 1 May 1924. On 30 June 1924 he was transferred to the 7th Engineering Group, and on 20 October 1926 to the 8th Engineering Regiment. On 8 May 1927 he was promoted to colonel, and from 1 January 1928 he was appointed commander of the 11th Engineer Regiment. He was later transferred to the intelligence service of the Royal Italian Army, heading the Servizio Informazioni Militare between 1932 and 1934. He was then commander of the engineers of the Army Corps of Florence and later, after promotion to brigadier general on 16 June 1935, he was deputy commander of the 126th Infantry Division "Assietta II", participating in the Second Italo-Ethiopian War.

He was promoted to major general on 21 November 1937; in the following year he became commander of the 20th Infantry Division "Curtatone and Montanara", later renamed 20th Infantry Division "Friuli" in 1939. Under his leadership the division participated in the first war operations after the Kingdom of Italy entered the Second World War on 10 June 1940. After leaving the command of the division on 31 August the same year, on the following day he became acting commander of the VII Army Corps of Florence until 14 April 1941, after which he was transferred to the Ministry of War and given command of the XVII Army Corps in Rome; on 3 November 1941 he was again given command of the VII Army Corps, which he maintained until 9 June 1942, when it was renamed XXX Corps.

On 1 January 1942 he was promoted to lieutenant general, while his XXX Corps trained for the planned invasion of Malta, for which Sogno was scheduled to be overall commander of the invasion force; this operation was however cancelled and in November 1942 the Corps was transferred to Tunisia, where it fought under Sogno’s command until May 1943. On 8 May 1943, five days before the final surrender of all Axis forces in Africa, Sogno was repatriated with one of the last flights to Castelvetrano, thus escaping capture. From 5 July to 1 September 1943 he commanded the II Army Corps in Siena, being then replaced by General Gervasio Bitossi.

He was then designated to replace General Lorenzo Dalmazzo as commander of the Ninth Army in Albania from 9 September 1943, but a few hours before leaving Rome for Tirana he was stopped by the proclamation of the Armistice of Cassibile. There he participated in an unsuccessful attempt, along with Generals Giacomo Carboni and Antonio Sorice, to replace Marshal of Italy Pietro Badoglio with the Marshal Enrico Caviglia as head of the Italian government. He was designated by Caviglia as provisional Chief of Staff of the Army during the attempt to organize the defense of the capital against the invading Germans; he started negotiations with the latter, which ended on 10 September with the surrender of the capital. He then evaded capture, joining the Clandestine Military Front and after the liberation of Rome, in 1944, he became president of the Supreme Military Tribunal for Liberated Lands. He retired from the Army in 1947, and died in 1971.
