= List of governors-general of Italian Libya =

Governor-General of Italian Libya
- Governatore Generale della Libia italiana
- Coat of arms of Italian Libya

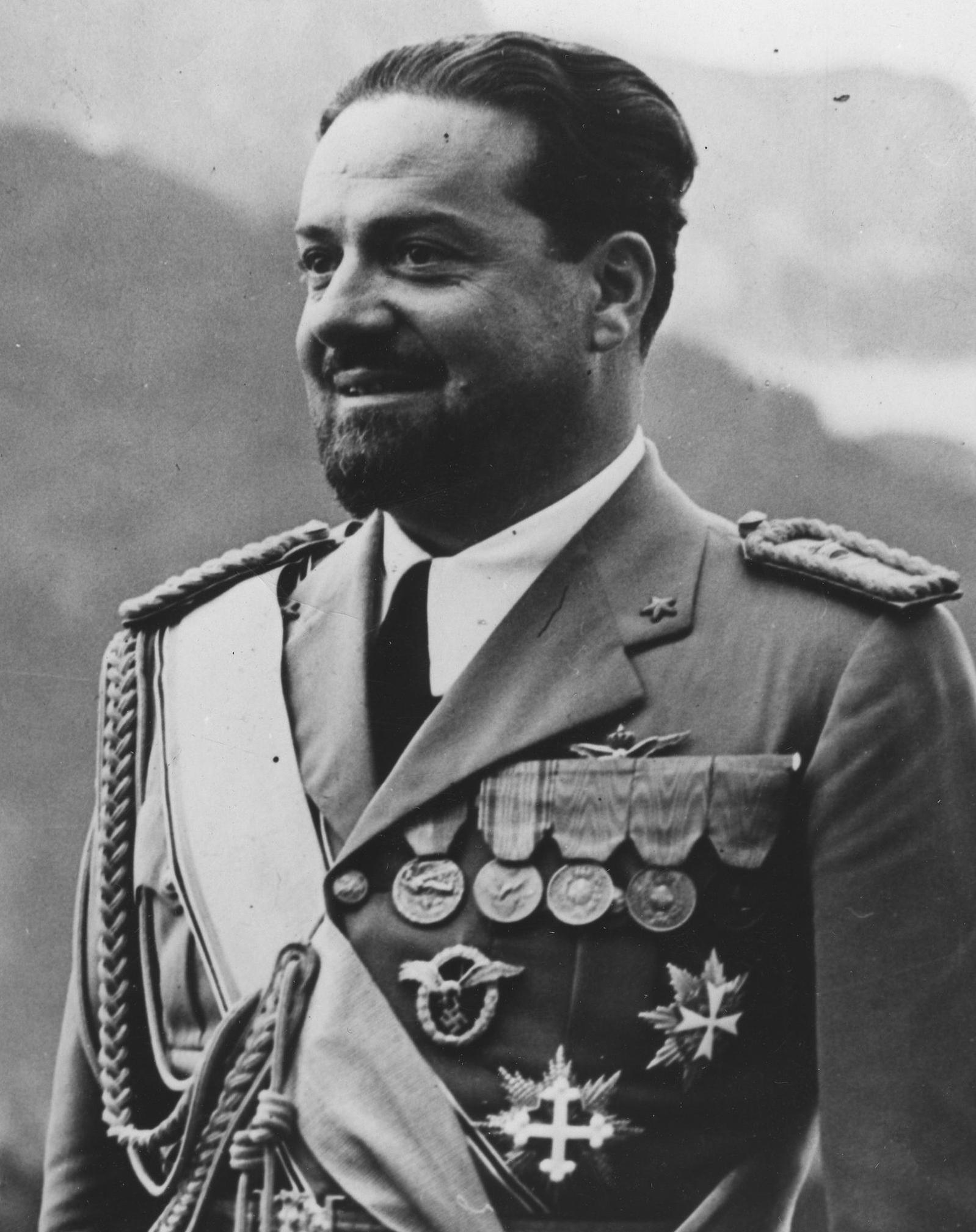
- Longest serving Italo Balbo; 1 January 1934 – 28 June 1940
- Reports to: King of Italy
- Residence: Governor-General's Palace, Tripoli
- Precursor: Governor of Italian Tripolitania; Governor of Italian Cyrenaica
- Formation: 1 January 1934
- First holder: Italo Balbo
- Final holder: Giovanni Messe
- Abolished: 13 May 1943
- Succession: Allied administrators of Libya

This article lists the governors-general of Italian Libya, a colony of the Italian Empire from 1934 to 1943.

== List ==
No.	Portrait	Governor-General	Took office	Left office	Time in office	Defence branch
1	Italo Balbo	Marshal of the Air; Italo Balbo (1896–1940) (Note: Although Pietro Badoglio was uniquely governor of Tripolitania (including Fezzan) and Cyrenaica from 1929 to 1933, Libya became a united province under Balbo.)	1 January 1934	28 June 1940 †	6 years, 179 days	Regia Aeronautica
2	Rodolfo Graziani	Marshal; Rodolfo Graziani (1882–1955)	1 July 1940	25 March 1941 (Note: Replaced in the aftermath of Operation Compass, during the Western Desert campaign of World War II.)	267 days	Royal Italian Army
3	Italo Gariboldi	General; Italo Gariboldi (1879–1970)	25 March 1941	19 July 1941	116 days	Royal Italian Army
4	Ettore Bastico	Marshal; Ettore Bastico (1876–1972)	19 July 1941	2 February 1943	1 year, 198 days	Royal Italian Army
–	Giovanni Messe	General; Giovanni Messe (1883–1968); Acting	2 February 1943	13 May 1943	100 days	Royal Italian Army

== See also ==
- Italian Libya
- Italian Cyrenaica
  - List of colonial governors of Italian Cyrenaica
- Italian Tripolitania
  - List of colonial governors of Italian Tripolitania
- History of Libya
- Italo-Turkish War
- North African campaign
