= Timeline of the Second Italo-Ethiopian War =

The following is a timeline relating to the Second Italo–Ethiopian War to the end of 1936. A number of related political and military events followed until 1942, but these have been omitted.

== 1930 ==
- Italy builds a fort at Walwal, an oasis in the Ogaden, as part of their gradual encroachment into what had been generally considered Ethiopian territory.

== 1934 ==
- September 29: Italy and Ethiopia release a joint statement refuting any aggression between each other.
- November 23: An Anglo–Ethiopian boundary commission discovers the Italian force at Walwal. British members of the delegation soon retire to avoid an international incident.
- December 5: Tensions result in a border clash at Walwal.
- December 6: Abyssinia protests Italian aggression at Walwal.
- December 8: Italy demands apology for Walwal incident.

== 1935 ==
- January 3: Ethiopia appeals to the League of Nations for arbitration into the Walwal incident.
- January 7: On Pierre Laval's visit to Rome, the French and Italians sign a pact which, among other conditions, allows Italy a free hand in dealing with Ethiopia in exchange for Italian support against German aggression.
- February 23: Benito Mussolini sends Emilio De Bono to Italian Eritrea and Rodolfo Graziani to Italian Somaliland along with 100,000 Italian troops to prepare for invasion.
- March 8: Ethiopia again requests arbitration and notes Italian military build-up.
- March 13: Italy and Ethiopia agree on a neutral zone in the Ogaden.
- March 17: Ethiopia again appeals to the League due to Italian build-up.
- March 22: The Italians yield to pressure from the League of Nations for arbitration into the Walwal incident.
- May 11: Ethiopia again protests the Italian mobilization.
- May 20 – 21: The League of Nations holds a special session to discuss the crisis in Ethiopia.
- May 25: League council resolves to meet if no fifth arbitrator has been selected by June 25, or if a settlement isn't reached by August 25.
- June 19: Ethiopia requests neutral observers.
- June 23 – 24: Britain sends Anthony Eden to offer concessions about Ethiopia, they are rejected by Italy.
- June 25: Italian and Ethiopian officials meet in The Hague to discuss arbitration.
- July 9: The discussions fall apart.
- July 25: Britain declares an arms embargo on both Italy and Ethiopia.
- July 26: The League confirms that no fifth member has been selected.
- August 3: The League limits arbitration talks to matters except for the sovereignty of Walwal. They are to meet again on September 4 to examine relations between the two countries.
- August 12: Abyssinia pleads for arms embargo to be lifted.
- August 16: France and Britain offer Italy large concessions in Ethiopia to avert war which are rejected.
- August 22: Britain reaffirms its embargo on armaments.
- September 3: The League exonerates both Italy and Ethiopia of the Walwal incident since both powers believed it was within their border.
- September 10: Pierre Laval, Anthony Eden and Sir Samuel Hoare agree on limitations to Italian sanctions.
- September 25: Ethiopia again asks for neutral observers.
- September 28: Ethiopia begins to mobilize its large, but poorly-equipped, army.
- October 3: Italy invades Ethiopia. Italian forces under De Bono advance from Eritrea into northern Ethiopia. Italian forces under Graziani stand ready to advance from Italian Somaliland into southern Ethiopia. Italy is condemned by the League for attacking without formal declaration of war.
- October 5: The northern Italian army captures Adigrat.
- October 6: The northern Italian army captures Adowa.
- October 7: The League of Nations declares Italy the aggressor, prepares to set sanctions against it.
- October 11: League members voted to impose sanctions unless Italy withdraws.
- October 14: De Bono issues a proclamation ordering the suppression of slavery in Ethiopia.
- October 15: The northern Italian army captures Axum.
- October 18: Britain assures Italy it will not take independent action in the Mediterranean.
- October 27: Mussolini gives Badoglio permission to use mustard gas "as an 'ultima ratio' to overwhelm enemy resistance and in case of counter-attack." This was in direct violation of the 1899 and 1907 Hague Conventions, which outlawed the use of chemical weapons.
- November 6: Due to the cautious approach of General De Bono, Mussolini threatens to replace him.
- November 8: The northern Italian army captures Mekele.
- November 18: Sanctions go into effect against Italy. They do not include oil or steel.
- December 8: Hoare-Laval Plan is signed, which conceded two-thirds of Ethiopia to Italy.
- December 9: Hoare-Laval Plan is made public. It is rejected by Ethiopia and causes political scandal in France and Britain.
- December 17: De Bono is replaced by Marshal Pietro Badoglio as Commander in Chief of the entire operation and as the commander in the north. Soon after, Haile Selassie launches his "Christmas Offensive" to test the new Italian commander.
- December 26: Italian aviator Tito Minniti is killed by Ethiopian forces.
- December 28. Ostensibly in response to Minniti's killing and mutilation, Mussolini gives Badoglio permission to use mustard gas "on a vast scale". Again, this was in direct violation of the 1899 and 1907 Hague Conventions, which outlawed the use of chemical weapons.

== 1936 ==
- January 3: Emperor Haile Selassie protests to League about Italy's bombing of villages.
- January 7 – 10: In the Battle of Ganale Dorya, General Graziani counter-attacks the advancing troops of Ras Desta Damtew. After more than three days of slaughter, the Ethiopians break and flee.
- January 20: Negele Boran in Sidamo province is captured by Graziani. Ethiopia asks for stronger sanctions against Italy.
- January 20– 24: The inconclusive First Battle of Tembien brings the Ethiopian "Christmas Offensive" to an end.
- February 10: The Italians attack and the Ethiopians under Ras Mulugeta counterattack in the Battle of Amba Aradam southwest of Chalacot.
- February 19: The Battle of Amba Aradam ends and the Ethiopians are defeated with heavy losses, including Mulugeta and his son.
- February 27: The Second Battle of Tembien begins.
- February 29: The Ethiopians are defeated in the Second Battle of Tembien leaving few survivors from the armies of Ras Kassa and Ras Seyoum.
- February 29: The Battle of Shire begins.
- March 3: The League asks Italy and Ethiopia to open negotiations.
- March 4: The Battle of Shire ends with the destruction of Ras Imru's army.
- March 5: Ethiopia accepts negotiations appeal.
- March 20: Ethiopia again appeals to the League, stating that nothing effective had yet been enforced.
- March 21: Emperor Haile Selassie protests to the League again, reporting Italian atrocities such as use of chemical weapons, destruction of ambulances and the massacre of civilians.
- March 29: Italian planes firebomb Harar.
- March 31: Emperor Haile Selassie personally leads an unsuccessful counterattack in the Battle of Maychew. This is the last major battle of the war on the northern front.
- April 1: Ethiopia pleads for removal of arms embargo, financial assistance, and heavier sanctions on Italy; Achille Starace's East African Fast Column (Colonna Celere dell'Africa Orientale) arrives in Gondar.
- April 4: Most of what remained of Haile Selassie's withdrawing army is destroyed at Lake Ashangi.
- April 14: The Battle of the Ogaden begins on the southern front.
- April 17: The League admits failure in the Italo-Ethiopian dispute.
- April 25: The Ethiopians are defeated during the Battle of the Ogaden, but much of the Ethiopian army escapes.
- April 26: Badoglio's launches his "March of the Iron Will" from Dessie.
- April 27: Princess Tsehai of Ethiopia appeals to the League.
- May 2: Emperor Haile Selassie leaves the capital city of Addis Ababa for Djibouti, whence he travels to Europe to personally address the League. He appoints Ras Imru Haile Selassie as his regent during his absence.
- May 5: The "March of the Iron Will" is completed and Addis Ababa is captured by Italian forces.
- May 7: Italy officially annexes Ethiopia.
- May 8: Graziani enters Harar.
- May 9: Victor Emmanuel III is proclaimed Emperor of Abyssinia and Badoglio is appointed as his Viceroy in Ethiopia.
- May 10: Italian troops from the northern front and from the southern front link up at Dire Dawa.
- June 1: Italy merges Ethiopia with Eritrea and Italian Somaliland, calling the new state Africa Orientale Italiana (Italian East Africa).
- June 11: Marshal Graziani is appointed Viceroy of Ethiopia.
- June 30: Emperor Haile Selassie addresses the League of Nations. The League officially condemns the Italian actions.
- July 4: The League drops all sanctions against Italy.
- July 28: Two sons of Ras Kassa lead several thousand men in an attempt to recapture Addis Ababa from the Italians, but are driven back by the Italian garrison. Suspected of supporting this action, the archbishop of Dessie, Abuna Petros, is shot by the Italians.
- October: The Italians begin armed campaigns into the two-thirds of Ethiopia still administered by Imperial officials.
- December 18: Ras Imru surrenders to the Italians near the Gojeb River. Italy declares the country pacified.

== 1937 ==
- February 19: The final battle between the two armies is fought: Gogetti. The surviving elements of the armies of Sidamo and Bale are encircled and destroyed by the Italian forces near Lake Shala. Dejazmach Beiene Merid and Dejazmach Gabre Mariam are killed; Ras Desta Damtew although wounded escapes the slaughter, only to be hunted down and killed five days later.
- February 19: Yekatit 12 massacre. In response to the attempted assassination of Marshal Graziani by Ethiopian rebels, between 19,200 and 30,000 Ethiopian civilians were massacred in Addis Ababa.
- December 21: Amedeo, 3rd Duke of Aosta is appointed Viceroy of Ethiopia.
