= Ettore Bastico =

Italian military officer and commander before and during World War II

Maresciallo d'Italia Ettore Bastico
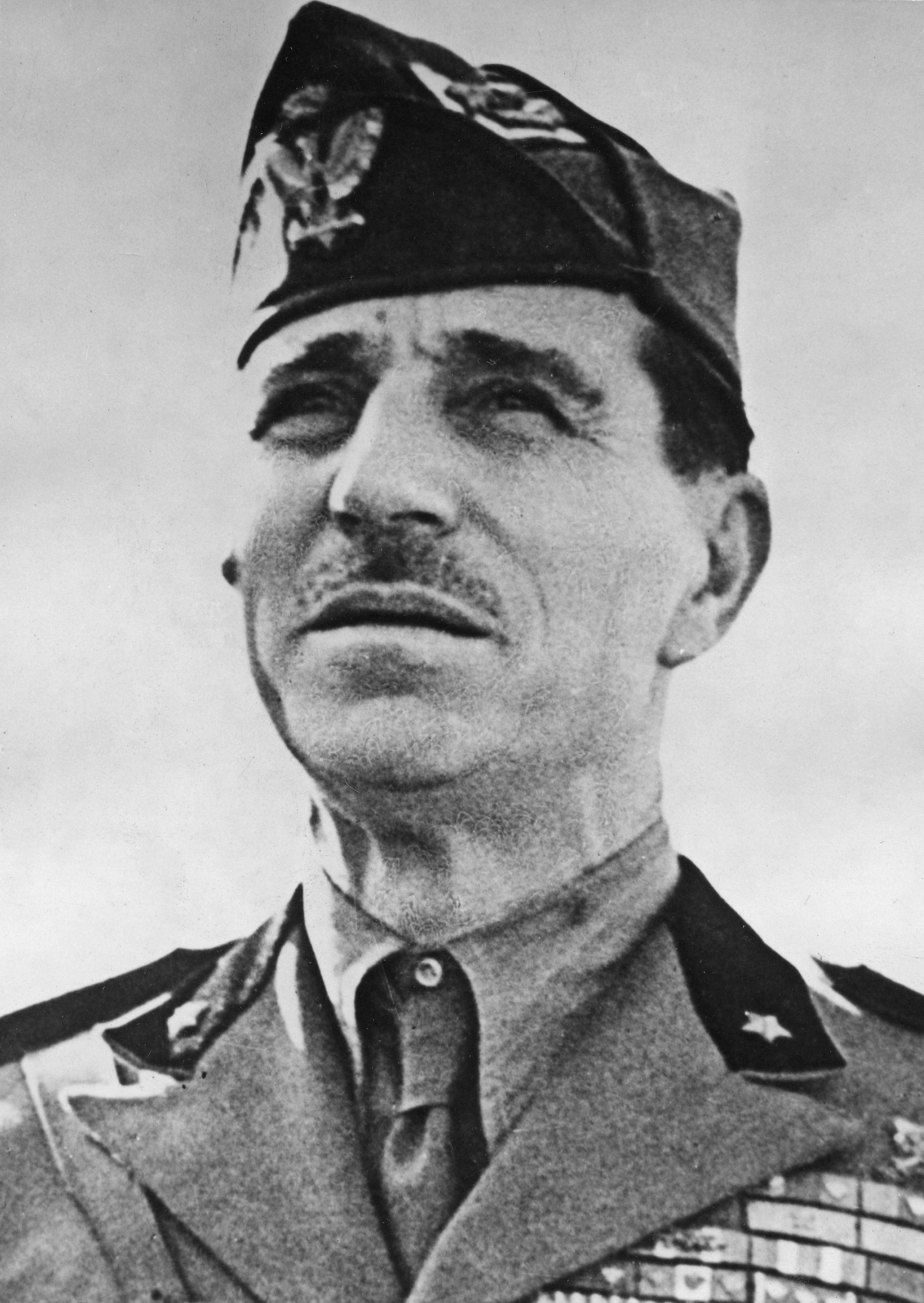
- Bastico in 1942

Governor-General of Italian Libya
- In office 19 July 1941 – 2 February 1943
- Monarch: Victor Emmanuel III
- Prime Minister: Benito Mussolini
- Preceded by: Italo Gariboldi
- Succeeded by: Giovanni Messe (acting)

Personal details
- Born: 9 April 1876 Bologna, Kingdom of Italy
- Died: 2 December 1972 (aged 96) Rome, Italy

Military service
- Allegiance: Kingdom of Italy
- Branch/service: Royal Italian Army
- Years of service: 1896–1943
- Rank: Marshal of Italy
- Commands: Army of the Po
- Battles/wars: Italo-Turkish War; World War I; Second Italo-Ethiopian War; Spanish Civil War; World War II; North African campaign; Western Desert campaign

Ettore Bastico (9 April 1876 – 2 December 1972) was an Italian field marshal who served as the commander of Axis forces in North Africa from 1941 to 1943 during World War II. In addition to being a general of the Royal Italian Army, he served as the governor of the Italian held Aegean islands and of Libya. After his time in the army, he became a military historian and published several books.

== Biography ==
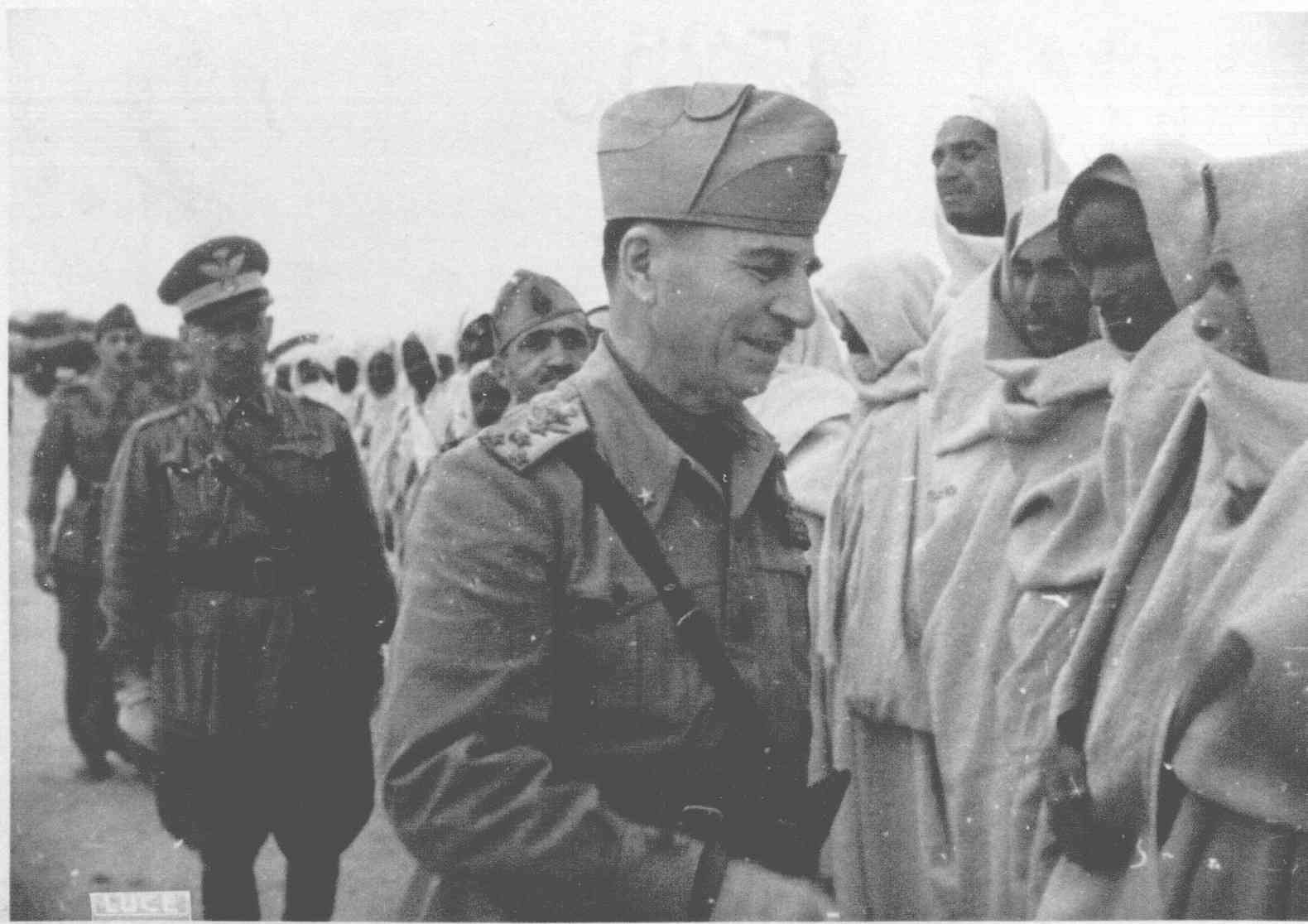
Bastico in North Africa

Bastico was born in Bologna, Italy. When he came of age, Bastico joined the Italian Army and fought in World War I. In 1928, Bastico was promoted to brigadier (generale di brigata). At that time, the Kingdom of Italy was ruled by Fascist dictator Benito Mussolini.

In this role, Bastico was a target of Giulio Douhet in Recapitulation (published with the work The Command of the Air). Douhet devotes many pages to critically examining six "basic theories" put forth by Bastico and how they relate to the future of an Independent Air Force's role in future wars.

Bastico was promoted to major general on 29 May 1932 and in 1935, he commanded the 1st CC.NN. Division "23 Marzo" during the Second Italo-Abyssinian War. In 1935, Bastico was the commander of the III Corps in Ethiopia and on 10 February 1936 he was promoted to lieutenant general (generale di corpo d'armata). From 1936 to 1937, he was the commander of the II Corps.

In 1937, during the later stages of the Spanish Civil War, Bastico replaced Mario Roatta as the commander-in-chief of the Italian volunteer corps in Spain, the Corpo Truppe Volontarie. The CTV was sent to help the Spanish Nationalists side in the war. From mid-1937, Bastico's force fought in the Battle of Santander, a decisive victory for the Nationalists. In late 1937, Bastico was replaced by Mario Berti. In October 1937, Bastico received the rank of general, "generale di corpo d'armata designato d'armata," the highest rank that could be assigned if Italy was not officially at war. In February 1939, the Italian volunteers left Spain.

He was then assigned to the Second Army. Shortly after, Bastico was appointed commander of the new motorized Sixth Army, known at the "Army of the Po," stationed in the Po Valley area. In 1939, Bastico was named senator of the Kingdom of Italy.

When Italy entered World War II, Bastico was Governor of the Italian Aegean Islands (Dodecanese) and he was promoted to full general (Generale d'Armata) on 7 August 1940.

On 19 July 1941, Bastico was named Governor-General of Italian Libya and commander-in-chief over all Axis forces in North Africa. Since Erwin Rommel was officially under Italian command in the North African campaign, Rommel's plans had to be first approved by Bastico.

Bastico was made the commandant of the Giado concentration camp, established in February 1942 to intern Libyan and Italian Jews.

Bastico was promoted to Marshal of Italy (Maresciallo d'Italia) on 12 August 1942, largely to avoid him being junior in rank to Rommel, who was promoted to field marshal (Generalfeldmarschall) on 22 June.

When Libya was lost to the British Eighth Army's advance, since 2 February 1943 he was left without a command for the rest of the war.

Bastico died in Rome at 96, after spending his last years studying history. At the time of his death, he was the last living Italian military officer to have held an Italian five-star-rank in an active capacity. (Umberto II, the last King of Italy, who was appointed a marshal of Italy in a ceremonial capacity, died in 1983).

== Honours ==
- Knight Grand Cross of the Order of Merit of the Italian Republic - 2 June 1957
- Knight Grand Cross of the Military Order of Savoy - 17 February 1942 (Grand Officer: 1 May 1939; Commander: 9 July 1936)
- Knight Grand Cross of the Order of the Crown of Italy
- Knight Grand Cross of the Colonial Order of the Star of Italy
- Grand Officer of the Order of Saints Maurice and Lazarus
- Commander of the Sovereign Military Order of Malta
- Knight of the Order of Vittorio Veneto
- Silver Medal of Military Valor
- Bronze Medal of Military Valor
- War Cross for Military Valor
- Distinction for War Merit (general officer degree)
- Distinction for War Merit (superior officer degree)
- Seven awards of the War Merit Cross
- Commemorative Medal for the Italo-Turkish War 1911-1912
- Commemorative Medal for the Spanish Campaign (1936–1938)
- Commemorative Medal of the Volunteer Division of Littorio (guerra di Spagna 1936–38)
- Commemorative Medal for the Italo-Austrian War 1915-1918
- Commemorative Medal of the Unity of Italy
- Allied Victory Medal
- Cross of Military Merit of Spain
- French Croix de Guerre (1914–1918)
- German Cross in Gold (5 December 1942)

== Works ==
Bastico wrote some books about Italian military history. The most famous are:

- "Il Ferreo Terzo Corpo in Africa Orientale" (1937)
- "L'evoluzione dell'arte della guerra" (1930)

== See also ==
- Ugo Cavallero
- Rodolfo Graziani
- Marshal of Italy

Military offices
Preceded by Italo Gariboldi	Commander-in-Chief of Italian North Africa and Governor-General of Italian Libya; 19 July 1941—2 February 1943	Succeeded by Giovanni Messe
