= Camillo Grossi =

Italian general

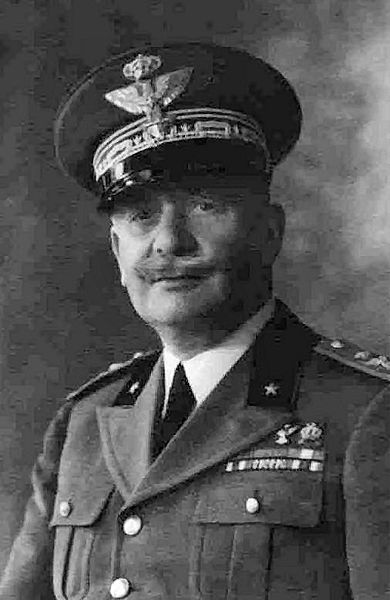
- Born: 30 September 1876; Grosseto, Kingdom of Italy
- Died: 16 June 1941 (aged 64); Turin, Kingdom of Italy
- Military career
- Allegiance: Kingdom of Italy
- Branch: Royal Italian Army
- Service years: 1894–1941
- Rank: Lieutenant General
- Commands: 2nd Alpini Regiment; Cuneo Territorial Military Division; Army Corps of Turin; Fourth Army; Army Group East
- Conflicts: World War I; World War II
- Awards: War Merit Cross; Military Order of Savoy; Order of the Crown of Italy; Order of Saints Maurice and Lazarus; Order of Military Merit; Order of the Crown; National Order of Merit

Camillo Grossi (Grosseto, 30 September 1876 – Turin, 16 June 1941) was an Italian general during the interwar period and World War II. He was also a member of the Italian Senate from 5 April 1939 until his death in office in 1941.

== Biography ==
Born in Tuscany, he entered the Military Academy of Modena in 1894 and began his career in the Alpini Corps. He participated in the First World War with the rank of major and later colonel (from 1917), serving as Chief of Staff of the Third Army and later as head of the press office at the Supreme Command. Between 1921 and 1923 he headed the operations office of the General Staff, and was later commander of the 2nd Alpini Regiment. In 1925 he joined the staff of the Ministry of War, where he established the inter-force coordination office and served as the minister's chief of staff from 14 December 1925 to 13 June 1932, being promoted to major general on 1 October 1931. From 1933 to 1935 he commanded the territorial military division of Cuneo, being promoted to Lieutenant General on 28 February 1935, after which he assumed command of the Army Corps of Turin. In 1938-1939 he was commander of the Fourth Army. On 5 April 1939, he was appointed senator for life in the Senate of the Kingdom of Italy, becoming a member of the Senate Commission for the Armed Forces.

On 3 November 1939 he was appointed commander of Army Group East, stationed in northeastern Italy with headquarters in Cervignano del Friuli and comprising the Second Army (deployed along the border with Yugoslavia), the Army of the Po (stationed in Lombardy) and the 8th Army (stationed between Veneto and Romagna). Army Group East was dissolved on 10 July 1940, one month after Italy's entry into World War II, an on 8 December 1940 Grossi became president of the Italian Armistice Commission with France (replacing General Pietro Pintor, who had been killed in an air crash) until 16 June 1941, when he suddenly died in Turin from a heart attack.
