= Ugo Cavallero =

Italian general (1880–1943)

Maresciallo d'Italia Ugo Cavallero
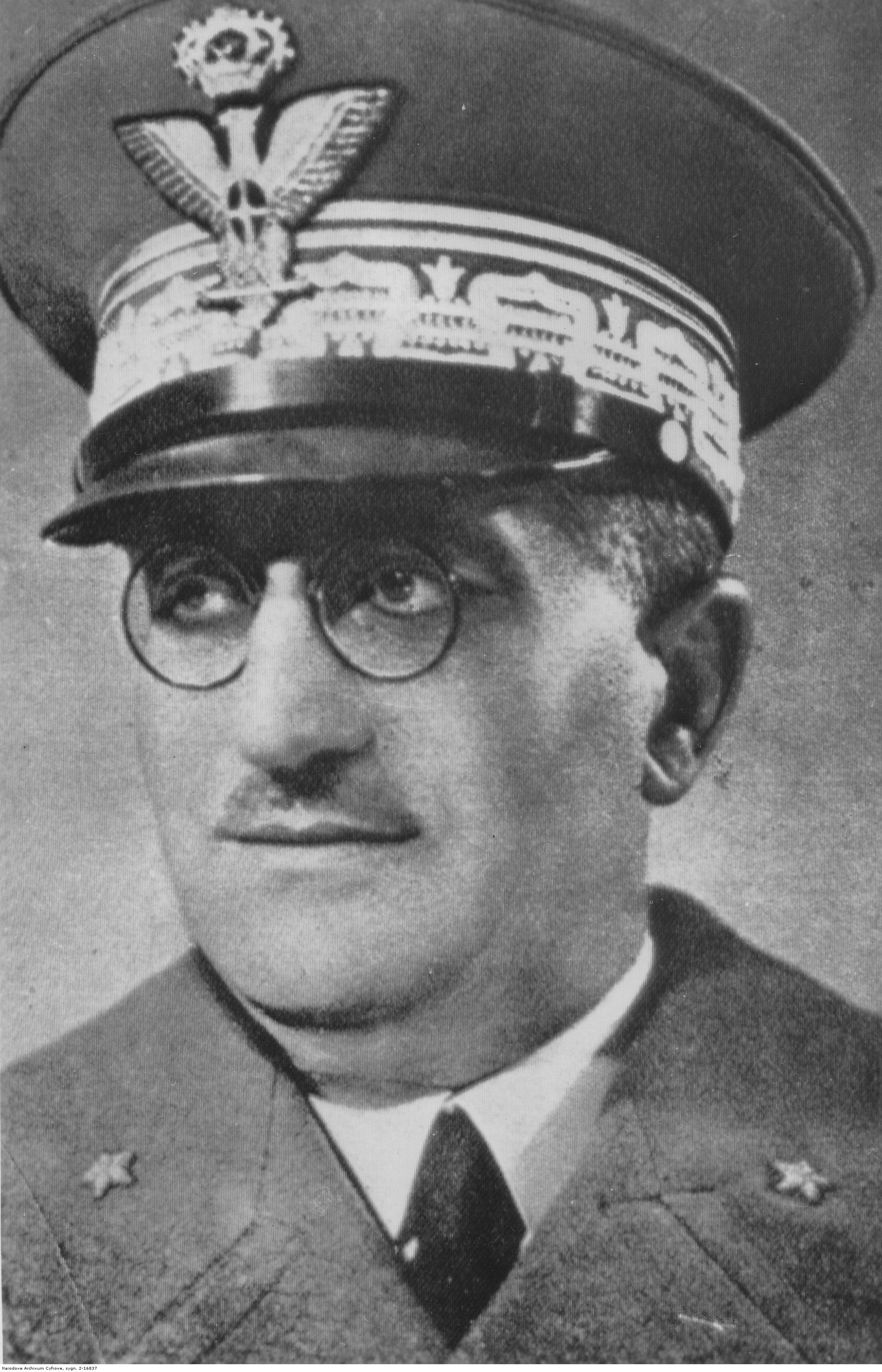

Chief of the Italian General Staff
- In office 5 December 1940 – 1 February 1943
- Preceded by: Pietro Badoglio
- Succeeded by: Vittorio Ambrosio

Personal details
- Born: 20 September 1880 Casale Monferrato, Piedmont, Italy
- Died: 13 September 1943 (aged 62) Frascati, Lazio, Italy
- Awards: Knight's Cross of the Iron Cross; Order of the German Eagle (1st class)

Military service
- Allegiance: Kingdom of Italy
- Branch/service: Royal Italian Army
- Years of service: 1900–1943
- Rank: Marshal of Italy
- Commands: Chief of the General Staff
- Battles/wars: Italo-Turkish War; World War I World War II

Ugo Cavallero (20 September 1880 – 13 September 1943) was an Italian military commander before and during World War II. He was the first Chief of the Comando Supremo (Italian Supreme Command) in June 1941. He was dismissed from his command due to his lacklustre performance, and was arrested upon the fall of Benito Mussolini's regime. Cavallero was later freed by the Germans, but refused to collaborate and was found dead the following day.

== Biography ==
=== Early life and career ===
Born in Casale Monferrato, Piedmont, Cavallero had a privileged childhood as a member of the Italian nobility. After attending military school, Cavallero was commissioned a second lieutenant in 1900. Cavallero later attended college and graduated in 1911, earning a degree in mathematics. A man of vast culture, Cavallero was fluent in both German and English. Still in the army, Cavallero fought in Libya in 1913, during the Italo-Turkish War, and was awarded a Bronze Medal of Military Valor.

In 1907, Cavallero was initiated in the regular Masonic Lodge "Dante Alighieri" of Turin, which was affiliated to the Grand Orient of Italy. Subsequently, he become a member of the Scottish Rite Serenenissima Gran Loggia d'Italia located in Rome, where on 15 August 1918 he received the 33rd and highest degree.

=== World War I ===
In 1915, Cavallero was transferred to the Italian Supreme Command. A skilled organizer and tactician, Cavallero became a brigadier general and chief of the Operations Office of the Italian Supreme Command in 1918. In this capacity, Cavallero was instrumental in forming plans that led to Italian victories at Piave and Vittorio Veneto during World War I. During his time as chief of the plan of Italian General Staff, he developed an antipathy with Pietro Badoglio, the Sottocapo di Stato Maggiore (vice chief of the staff) of the army.

=== Interwar period ===
Cavallero retired from the army in 1919 but later rejoined in 1925, at which time he became Benito Mussolini’s undersecretary of war. A committed fascist, Cavallero was made a senator in 1926 and in 1927 became a major general. After leaving the army for a second time, Cavallero became involved in business and diplomatic enterprises throughout the late 1920s and early 1930s.

Cavallero rejoined the army for the third and final time in 1937. Promoted to lieutenant general, he became commander of the combined Italian forces in Italian East Africa in 1938 and was made a full general in 1940.

=== World War II ===
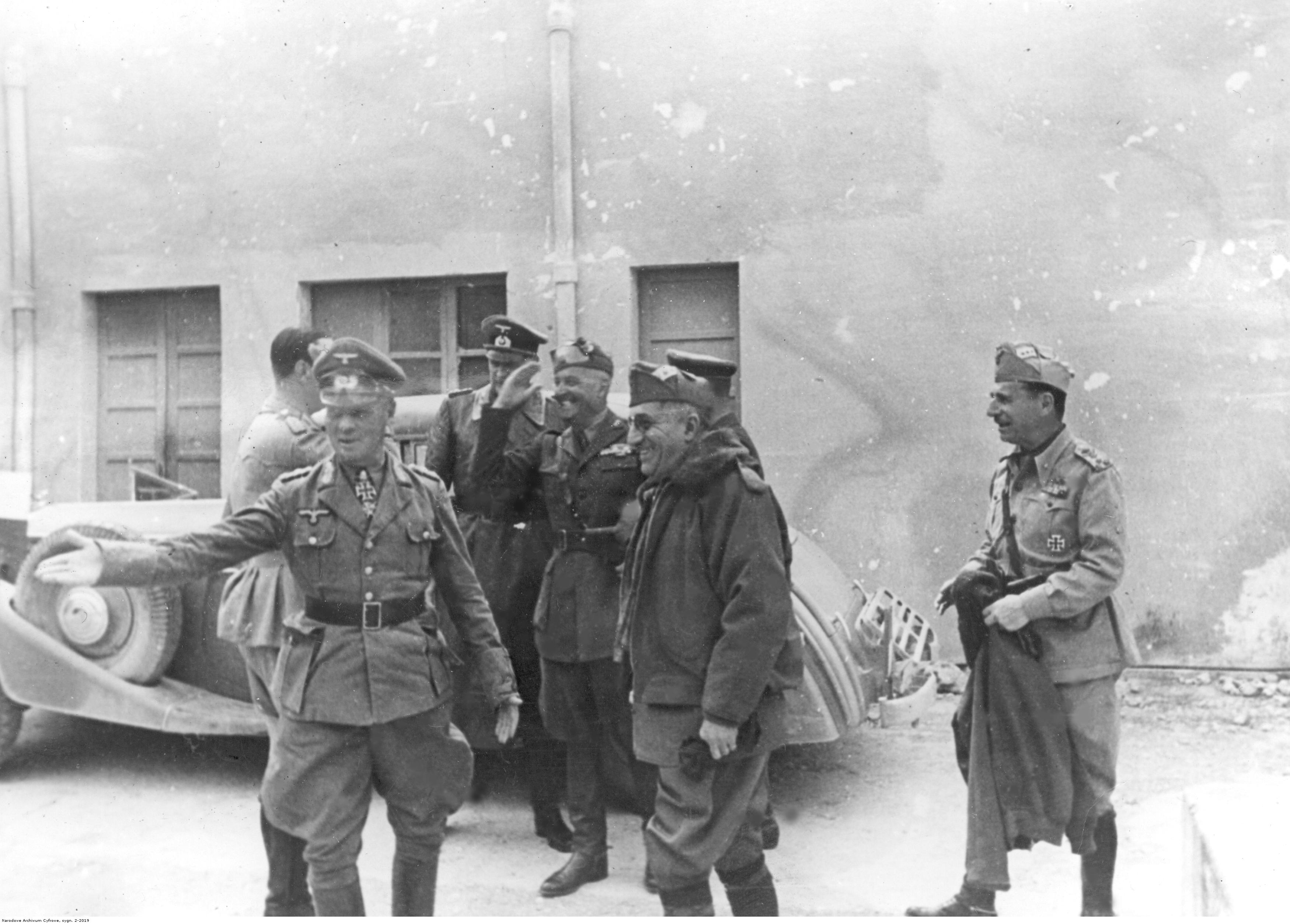
Field-Marshal Erwin Rommel (left) during a meeting with Ugo Cavallero (second from the right). General Ettore Bastico is visible next to him (first from the right).

After Italy entered World War II, on 6 December 1940 Cavallero replaced Pietro Badoglio as Chief of the Defence Staff. Shortly after his appointment, Cavallero was sent to command the Italian forces involved in the unsuccessful Greco-Italian War until the spring of 1941. While he managed to halt the Greek advance, Cavallero was unable to break the stalemate until the German intervention. In the meantime, his role as Chief of Staff was filled by General Alfredo Guzzoni.

On 15 and 19 May 1941 Cavallero, submitted proposals for the Stato Maggiore's complete reorganization to Mussolini. This was implemented in June. The Stato Maggiore Generale was redesignated Comando Supremo, made more efficient and transformed from a mere advisory body into a true military high command. Under Cavallero, the Comando Supremo maintained good relations with Oberbefehlshaber Süd, the command of German forces in Italy. Cavallero worked closely with German Field Marshal Albert Kesselring; however he had a rather conflicting relationship with Field Marshal Erwin Rommel, whose advance into Egypt after his success at the Battle of Gazala he opposed, advocating instead the planned invasion of Malta; his opinion, shared by Kesselring and Rintelen, was however discounted by Hitler and Mussolini. Cavallero was promoted to Marshal of Italy on 1 July 1942, soon after the promotion of Rommel to Field Marshal (largely to prevent Rommel from out-ranking him). Despite having a good grasp on the problems inherent to the war in the Mediterranean that Italy had to fight, his acquiescence to Mussolini's views (for example his insistence on augmenting the Italian contingent fighting on the Eastern Front) led to a fatal dispersion of Italy's meagre resources.

In January 1943, after the definitive loss of the African campaign and the setbacks suffered by the Italian Army in Russia, Cavallero was dismissed and replaced by General Vittorio Ambrosio. In response to Cavallero's dismissal, members of the Fascist leadership like Galeazzo Ciano, openly hostile to him, openly expressed their satisfaction.

After Mussolini's government was toppled by the King, the newly appointed Prime Minister Pietro Badoglio ordered the arrest of Cavallero. In a letter written in his own defence, Cavallero claimed he had opposed Mussolini and his regime. After the Armistice of Cassibile in September 1943, the Germans freed him. Kesselring offered Cavallero command of the forming armed forces of the Italian Social Republic, but the discovery of the letter led some to question his loyalty.

=== Death ===
In the morning of 14 September 1943, he was found dead by a gunshot in the garden of a hotel in Frascati, where he had dined and talked with Kesselring the night before. It is still up to debate whether he committed suicide or was assassinated by the Germans. It seems, however, that he firmly expressed his will to refuse to continue collaborating with the Germans.

== Honours and awards ==
=== Italian ===
- Knight of the Military Order of Savoy

"As General Staff Officer in charge of the Operations Section of the Office of the Chief of Staff of the Army gave, during the Austrian offensive, a precious inexhaustible contribution of intelligence, activity and expertise. Always animated by a very high sense of duty, supported even in the most adverse hours by unshakable faith in victory, he was a faithful and enlightened interpreter of the thoughts of the Command, tirelessly providing the most worthy and meritorious work. Vicenza 15 May–15 July 1916."
— Royal Decree Number 24 of 12 August 1916

- Officer of the Military Order of Savoy

"During three years of war, first as attaché, then as head of the operations office of the Supreme Command, he stood out in every circumstance for his lucid interpretation and prompt execution of the leaders' thoughts. In the coordination of information on the enemy, in the reorganization of the troops, and in the defensive and counter-offensive preparation of the battle from the Astico to the Piave he gave an invaluable contribution to the work of the supreme command, effectively contributing to the victory of our forces. Battle from Astico to the sea, 15–22 June 1918."
— Royal Decree of 27 June 1918

- Silver Medal of Military Valor

"As supreme commander of the armed forces of Italian East Africa, to deepen the knowledge of all the tactical elements necessary for the operations to be carried out and for a closer and safer contact with the troops located within vast regions that are not easy to navigate, he personally carried out, regardless of any risk or inconvenience, numerous aerial and terrestrial reconnaissances which often took place in adverse weather or in conditions of uncertain safety made such by the latent dangers of predonation, thus giving an example of a high sense of duty, of conscious contempt for danger, and a serene spirit of sacrifice. Sectors and skies of Shoa - Goggiam, January 1938–December 1938.»

- Bronze Medal of Military Valor

"Took on with great zeal and courage the functions of staff officer in charge of the command, assisting effectively for the entire day. Sidi Garbà, 16 May 1913.»

- War Merit Cross
- Knight of the Order of the Crown of Italy (4 June 1914)
- Officer of the Order of the Crown of Italy (29 December 1918)
- Commander of the Order of the Crown of Italy (8 August 1920)
- Grand Officer of the Order of the Crown of Italy (18 December 1921)
- Knight of the Order of Saints Maurice and Lazarus (13 September 1917)
- Officer of the Order of Saints Maurice and Lazarus (21 September 1921)
- Commander of the Order of Saints Maurice and Lazarus (11 June 1925)
- Knight of the Colonial Order of the Star of Italy (3 April 1924)
- Cross for length of service, officers and non-commissioned officers, 40 years
- Commemorative Medal for the Italo-Austrian War 1915–1918
- Commemorative Medal of the Unity of Italy
- Allied Victory Medal
- Commemorative Medal for the Italo-Turkish War 1911–1912
- War Merit Advancement Badge for General Officers and Admirals

"As Superior Commander of the Armed Forces of the A.O.I., he demonstrated the chosen virtues of a leader and carried out daring and effective command actions in numerous vast operational cycles of the great colonial police. A.O.I., 12 January 1938–15 April 1939."
— Royal Decree 15 May 1940.

=== Foreign ===
- Grand Officer of the Order of the White Lion (Czechoslovakia (31 January 1938)
- Knight's Cross of the Iron Cross as Generale di Corpo d'Armata and Chief of the Defence Staff of the Italian Royal Army (19 February 1942) (Nazi Germany)
- Knight Grand Cross of the Order of the German Eagle with Swords (November 1941) (Nazi Germany)
- Knight Grand Cross of the Sovereign Military Order of Malta (28 May 1927)

== See also ==
- Royal Italian Army
- Royal Italian Army during World War II
