= Army of the Po =

Field army of the Royal Italian Army (1939-1943)

The Army of the Po (Italian Armata del Po), numbered the Sixth Army (6^{a} Armata), was a field army of the Royal Italian Army (Regio Esercito) during World War II (1939–45).

== History ==
When it was initially formed on 10 November 1938 under the command of General Ettore Bastico, it comprised three corps:

- the Corpo d'Armata Autotrasportabile (Motor Transportable Corps), consisting of three divisions;
- the Corpo d'Armata Celere (Fast Corps), consisting of three celeri divisions;
- the Corpo d'Armata Corazzato (Armoured Corps), consisting of two motorised and two armoured divisions in the process of formation. These were the Ariete and Centauro armoured divisions (Note: They officially came into being on 1 February and 20 April 1939, respectively.) and the Trento and Trieste (Note: They officially came into being on 2 January and 4 April 1939, respectively.) motorised divisions.

This formation was the brainchild of General Alberto Pariani, then Chief of the General Staff, who desired to combine armoured and motorised divisions into a potent force based in the Po Valley and ready to move towards any of Italy's land borders at a moment's notice. By December 1938, Bastico had drawn up plans for concentrating the force around Tarvisio in the event of war with Austria or on a line from Udine to Trieste in the event of war with Yugoslavia.

In 1939, six Blackshirt battalions took part in the field manoeuvres of the Army of the Po. In the first half of 1940 the Centauro division was moved to Albania, where it took part in the Italian invasion of Greece later that year. During the Italian invasion of France (10–25 June 1940), the Army of the Po (minus the Centauro) was held in reserve.

In February 1941, the headquarters of the Army of the Po (Sixth Army) was transferred to southern Italy. On 1 March, the Armoured Corps became the XVII Corps and deployed to Albania as an infantry command. All three of the former corps of the Sixth Army took part in the invasion of Yugoslavia in April. In July 1943, the headquarters of the Sixth Army took charge of the defence of Sicily. The 6th Army suffered heavy losses against the Allies in July–August 1943 and withdrew to northern Italy for reorganization. It capitulated to the Germans upon the surrender of Italy in September 1943.

== Order of battle on 10 June 1940 ==
- Army of the Po (Sixth Army), General Mario Vercellino
  - Fast Corps, General Giovanni Messe
    - 1st Cavalry Division "Eugenio di Savoia", General Federico Ferrari Orsi
    - 2nd Cavalry Division "Emanuele Filiberto Testa di Ferro", General Gavino Pizzolato
    - 3rd Cavalry Division "Principe Amedeo Duca d'Aosta", General Mario Marazzani
  - Armoured Corps, General Fidenzio Dall'Ora
    - 101st Motorised Division "Trieste", General Vito Ferroni
    - 102nd Motorised Division "Trento", General Luigi Nuvoloni
    - 132nd Armoured Division "Ariete", General Ettore Baldassarre
    - 133rd Armoured Division "Littorio", General Luigi Manzi
  - Motor Transportable Corps: General Francesco Zingales
    - 9th Infantry Division "Pasubio", General Vittorio Giovannelli
    - 10th Infantry Division "Piave", General Ercole Roncaglia
    - 52nd Infantry Division "Torino", General Luigi Manzi

== Order of battle on 9 July 1943 (Sicily) ==
- Sixth Army, General Alfredo Guzzoni
  - XII Army Corps, General Mario Arisio, from 12 July: General Francesco Zingales
    - 26th Infantry Division "Assietta"
    - 28th Infantry Division "Aosta"
    - 202nd Coastal Division
    - 207th Coastal Division
    - 208th Coastal Division
    - 230th Coastal Division
    - XXIX Coastal Brigade
  - XVI Army Corps, General Carlo Rossi
    - 4th Infantry Division "Livorno"
    - 54th Infantry Division "Napoli"
    - 206th Coastal Division
    - 213th Coastal Division
    - XVIII Coastal Brigade
    - XIX Coastal Brigade

== Commanders ==
- Ettore Bastico (October 1938 – June 1940)
- Mario Vercellino (June 1940 – November 1940)
- Francesco Zingales (interim) (November 1940 – February 1941)
- Ezio Rosi (February 1941 – February 1943)
- Mario Roatta (February 1943 – June 1943)
- Alfredo Guzzoni (June 1943 – September 1943)

== Sources ==
- Crociani, P.; Battistelli, P. P. (2010). Italian Blackshirt, 1935–45. Osprey Publishing.
- Crociani, P.; Battistelli, P. P. (2011). Italian Army Elite Units and Special Forces, 1940–43. Osprey Publishing.
- Gooch, John (2007). Mussolini and His Generals: The Armed Forces and Fascist Foreign Policy, 1922–1940. New York: Cambridge University Press.
- Nafziger, George Francis (1997). "Italian Army, 10 June 1940" (PDF). United States Army Combined Arms Center. G. F. Nafziger.
