= XXIV Army Corps (Italy) =

Royal Italian Army corps

The XXIV Army Corps (Italian: XXIV Corpo d'Armata) was a corps of the Royal Italian Army between 1916–1917, and in 1943.

== History ==
There was a XXIV Corps in World War I, formed on 23 May 1916 and dissolved on 22 November 1917.

On 1 March 1943, a new XXIV Corps was created in Udine from the remnants of the Italian Alpine Army Corps returning from Russia.
From 1 June it was operational around Udine in intense anti-guerrilla activities against Italian and Yugoslav partisans.
The XXIV Corps was disarmed by the Germans and dissolved on 11 September 1943, as a result of the Armistice of Cassibile.

== Composition (1943) ==
- 3rd Alpine Division "Julia"
- 52nd Infantry Division "Torino"
- Alpine Marching Brigade
- troops of the 11th Border Guard Sector

== Commanders ==
- Enrico Caviglia (1917-1917)
- Licurgo Zannini (1943.05.01 – 1943.09.11)
