= March of the Iron Will =

1936 Italian advance on Addis Ababa

- Part of the Second Italo-Ethiopian War
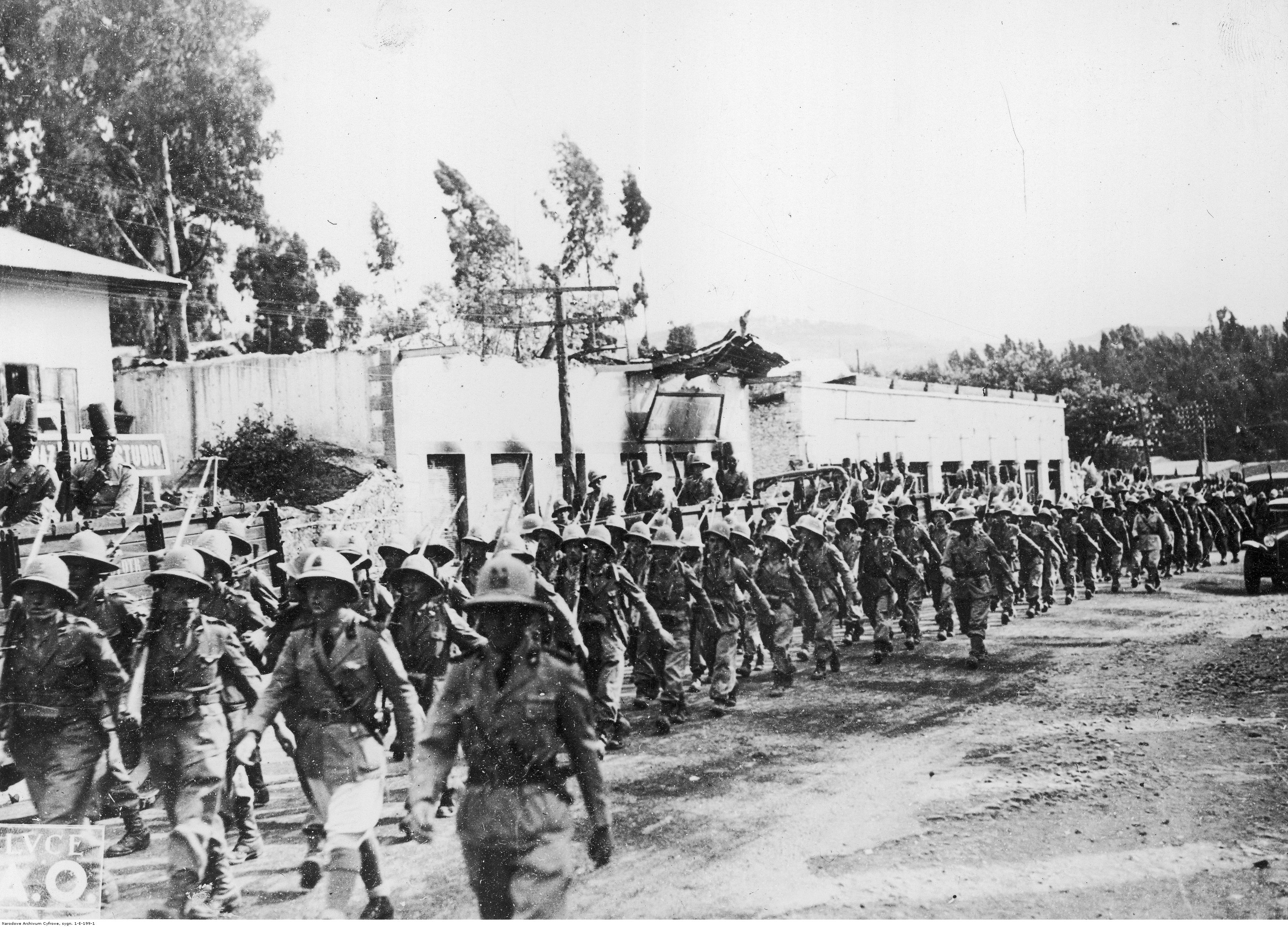
- Italian troops marching in Addis Ababa
Date	26 April – 5 May 1936
Location	Dessie–Addis Ababa, Ethiopian Empire
Result	Italian victory
Territorial changes	Occupation of Addis Ababa until 1941

Belligerents
Italy	Ethiopia

Commanders and leaders
Pietro Badoglio	Haile Selassie

Strength
12,500 Italians; 4,000 Eritreans	6,000 men

Casualties and losses
2 dead	15 dead

The March of the Iron Will (Italian: marcia della ferrea volontà) was an Italian offensive occurring from 26 April to 5 May 1936, during the final days of the Second Italo-Ethiopian War. Its goal was to capture the Ethiopian capital, Addis Ababa, in a show of force for Fascist propaganda. An Italian mechanized column under the command of Pietro Badoglio, Marshal of Italy, advanced from the town of Dessie to take Addis Ababa. The march covered a distance of approximately 200 miles (320 km).

It was an achievement that demonstrated the offensive potential of motorized forces in securing bold advances. However, the Italian "March of the Iron Will" turned out to be little more than a logistics exercise. An anonymous journalist at the time described it as "more of a sports event than a page in military history."

== Background ==
On morning of April 15, the Eritreans managed to rapidly capture Dessie with the help of supply drops from the air force, but were ordered to wait for the rest of the Italian army to catch up. While Badoglio was busy gathering all the available motorised vehicles in Eritrea, the work of the engineers and the 1st Army Corps to complete the road between Amba Alagi and Korem continued without stopping, and, thanks to the incessant work of around 50,000 men, on 17 April the road connecting Asmara and Dessié could be considered completed and it was therefore possible to begin to have the 1,785 motor vehicles that had been recovered flow to Dessié to form the motor convoy requested by Badoglio.

Meanwhile, contradictory reports were reaching the headquarters regarding the size of the Abyssinian troops deployed between Dessié and the capital. According to some estimates, it was believed that between 20,000 and 40,000 armed men could meet and block the passage, but Badoglio, convinced of the disintegration of the Ethiopian armies and strong in the experience accumulated in the battles of the previous month, was of the opinion that there were no serious obstacles along the 400 km of road that separated the former headquarters of Haile Selassie from Addis Ababa. Firm in his convictions, Badoglio broke the ice and on the 20th, using 12 Caproni 133s, he transferred the entire general staff from Enda Iyesus to Dessie and on the 23rd he issued the final orders, personally assuming command of the column.

Thanks to the organizational genius of a Quartermaster-General Fidenzio Dall'Ora, Badoglio's "mechanized column" came together in Dessie between 21 and 25 April. Dall'Ora was able to organize the most powerful "mechanized" column to appear on an African road up to that time. In addition to 12,500 Italian troops, the column included 1,785 cars and trucks of all makes (Fiats, Lancias, Alfa-Romeos, Fords, Chevrolets, Bedfords, and Studebakers), a squadron of light tanks (L3s), eleven batteries of artillery, and aircraft. Special vehicles carried 193 horses so that when the column arrived at the gates of Addis Ababa, the Marshal and his staff could leave their cars and ride in triumph on horseback.

== March ==
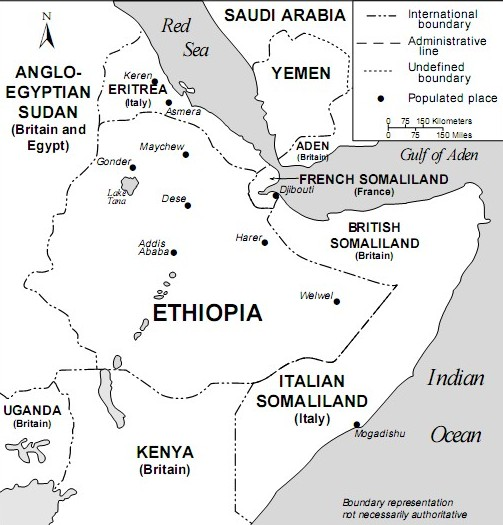
The Horn of Africa and southwest Arabia – Mid-1930s. The March of the Iron Will was between Dessie and Addis Ababa. At the same time, General Rodolfo Graziani was advancing from the south toward Harar. Emperor Haile Selassie travelled from Addis Ababa, to Harar to Djibouti in French Somaliland to go into exile.

Badoglio's mechanized force advanced along the Imperial Highway between Dessie and Addis Ababa. The Italian Commander-in-Chief was to uncharitably refer to this road as "a bad cart track". On 24 April, Badoglio sent two columns of 4,000 Eritreans ahead by force march to protect his mechanized force as a precautionary measure. But the adversity the Eritreans and the march itself encountered was mainly caused by rain and mud. Badoglio's precautionary measure proved to be superfluous.

However, the Ethiopians were organising a last desperate resistance with all their available forces at the steep climb of Termabér Pass. The plan included the use of cadets from the Holeta military school, supported by some artillery pieces. The Abyssinian troops were headed by a Swedish captain named Viking Tamm, who, however, was not sent the promised reinforcements from the capital. Therefore, seeing that the plan had failed due to a lack of adequate reinforcements, he was forced to limit himself to sabotaging the march by detonating some explosive charges which caused the road to collapse in one of the most inaccessible points.

After having eliminated a nucleus of 15 Ethiopians guarding the pass thanks to the help of a company of Alpini troops, the Italians' efforts were concentrated on making the road passable again, which had suffered serious damage for 35 metres as a chasm had opened up and created a drop into the void of around 500 metres. Thousands of men worked non-stop over the following 36 hours, often roped together and almost always under torrential rain, to allow the column to pass through. This was only possible, however, on 3 May after almost three days of forced halt.

=== Addis Ababa ===
While the Italian column was blocked at Termabér Pass, Haile Selassie, who narrowly avoided capture, returned to the capital. Having decided to carry out a resistance to the bitter end using the 6,000 men garrisoning the capital, reinforced by the able-bodied veterans of the army decimated at Lake Ascianghi, immediately called a meeting of his advisors at the Imperial Palace on 30 April.

In Addis Ababa, Emperor Haile Selassie visited the French Legation. After explaining to French Minister Paul Bodard that further defense of the capital was impossible, he explained that it was best for Empress Menen Asfaw and their two sons, Crown Prince Asfaw Wossen, 19, and Prince Makonnen, 13, to leave the country. Ultimately they would go to the Coptic monastery in the British Mandate of Palestine, but he asked the French Minister whether the Imperial Family could temporarily find refuge in French Somaliland and was assured by Bodard that they could.

Haile Selassie then returned to his Palace and crowds gathered at the Palace steps. To the gathering throng, he said, "Ethiopia, will fight until the last soldier and the last inch! Let every man who is not wounded or sick take arms and enough food to last five days and march north to fight the invader!" The crowd roared back to their Emperor: "We will go!" (Note: Time did not indicate what happened to the five-thousand men who marched north from Addis Ababa.)

Haile Selassie retired into his Palace for a final conference with his chieftains. He knew that the government would have to move from Addis Ababa. One possibility was for the government to relocate to Gore in the southwest and he sought comment on this plan. Initially, his chiefs said nothing at all. But, when the chiefs did talk, they explained that the one effective Ethiopian army left was fighting for its life under Ras Nasibu Emmanual in the Ogaden. This army was pitted against General Rodolfo Graziani's relentless advance on Harar. One after another, the chiefs rose to tell how hopeless the situation was and to say that there was nothing for the Emperor to do but rather flee the country to avoid his execution. There was then a vote, and the council voted 21 in favor of the Emperor fleeing, with 3 voting against. The emperor accepted the decision reluctantly and took the train to Djibouti at 4:00 on the morning of 2 May, arriving at his destination in the French colony on the morning of 3 May, where an English steamer was waiting for him which would accompany him first to Jerusalem and then to London.

Before he departed, Haile Selassie sent out three radio messages. First to Ras Imru Haile Selassie in Debre Markos appointing him as his Prince Regent, the second to Bitwoded Wolde Tsaddik appointing him as head of the government in Gore and the third to the remnants of the Imperial Guard, ordering them to rally to Aberra Kassa in Fiche.

Late on 2 May, after the Emperor left the city to go into exile, there was a breakdown in order and the city fell into complete chaos. The now leaderless soldiers of the imperial army went wild and began to pillage their own capital. Rioting in Addis Ababa grew worse by the hour and the Great Ghebbi was ransacked and looted. An attack was made on the Treasury's "gold house". A few loyal employees tried to save the remnants of the Emperor's gold with machine guns, but sword-swinging looters rushed them and cut off their hands as they clung to their guns. There was infighting between the various ethnic groups of the city as several thousand Galla and Gurage brigands entered the capital to join in on the plunder. The rioters then turned their attention to the foreigners in the city. Armenian and Greek shops were destroyed, and 2,000 foreigners fled to the safety of the French Legation, where they were effectively besieged. In total, around 500 people were killed during the riots, including 14 foreigners; one Englishman, one American, one Turk, four Greeks and seven Armenians.

=== The arrival of the Italians ===
Badoglio informed Mussolini that already on the night of 2 May he could occupy the capital using General Gallina's askaris who, having travelled with their column a different route, had not been blocked at the Termabér pass and had therefore already reached the gates of the capital, however for reasons of prestige and convenience it was believed that the entrance to the city should be reserved for national troops. Meanwhile, the next day Badoglio's motorized column was able to resume the march, pushing on as fast as possible, drew closer and closer. Italian aircraft reconnoitered over the city.

The main column reached the capital at 4:00 pm on 5 May. Heavy rain fell as Badoglio's forces entered the city and restored order. The rioting that started after Haile Selassie left lasted until order was restored with the arrival of the Italians. White flags were displayed everywhere as Badoglio made his triumphal entry into the city of the "King of Kings".

A detachment of Ethiopian customs guards presented arms as Badoglio's car drove past them. Further on, an Italian guard of honor, which accompanied the advance guard for this very purpose, paid Badoglio the same courtesy. There was no question now of stopping to allow Badoglio to use the horses brought for this occasion. The car and truck bound procession continued. (Note: Time indicates that Badoglio did stop to mount up and did enter Addis Ababa on horseback: "After much sweating and shouting, the procession was reformed. First came a patrol of Blackshirt motorcyclists, young and exuberant, followed by ten tankettes, each one hastily named after a battle of the past seven months. Marshal Badoglio entered on horseback.")

When Badoglio's entourage pulled up in front of the Italian legation at 5:45 pm, the Tricolour of the Kingdom of Italy was hoisted. Then followed three cheers for Italy's King Victor Emmanuel and three cheers for Italy's Fascist dictator Benito Mussolini. After the cheering, Badoglio turned to a senior member of the Italian Royal Air Force, Vincenzo Magliocco, and said: "We've done it! We've won!" Badoglio and Magliocco reportedly broke down in tears.

== Aftermath ==
During the week following Marshal Badoglio's entry into Addis Ababa, Dr. Johann Hans Kirchholtes, the German Minister to Ethiopia, visited what had been the Italian Legation in the Ethiopian capital city. Badoglio was now Viceroy and Governor-General of Italian East Africa and the former Italian Legation was now his headquarters. Kirchholtes provided the first recognition by any foreign government that the conquest of Ethiopia was an accomplished fact.

Meanwhile, one of Marshal Badoglio's staff officers, Captain Adolfo Alessandri, visited every foreign legation in Addis Ababa. Alessandri politely explained to each envoy that they would enjoy "every diplomatic privilege until the time of your departure." This was Italy's official notification to the world that occupied Ethiopia would not be considered to be on the same footing as the Japanese Empire's puppet state of Manchukuo. Instead, the former Ethiopian Empire was to be a colony of the Kingdom of Italy. Giuseppe Bottai was named as the first Governor of Addis Ababa and Haile Selassie's former Palace became his residence.

=== Proclamation of the Empire ===
The news of the end of the war was communicated in Italy on the evening of 5 May 1936: after sirens had called the population to assemble throughout the country, Mussolini appeared on the balcony of Palazzo Venezia and gave the announcement to a large crowd with a short speech. On the speech of 5 May, Mussolini outlined the destiny of Ethiopia and announced that the war was over. There were scenes of wild excitement, Mussolini was called back ten times by the jubilant crowds at the Palazzo Venezia.

On 7 May, Mussolini received the Grand Cross of the Military Order of Savoy from King Victor Emmanuel III. The King, in awarding the Duce the kingdom's highest military decoration, emphatically recognized Mussolini's direct leadership role: "As Minister of the Armed Forces, he prepared, led, and won the greatest colonial war in history."

On 9 May, Mussolini, reappearing from Palazzo Venezia, announced to a "delirious crowd" the proclamation of the Empire. This gathering was even more triumphal and rhetorical than the previous one. In this famous speech, he announced that "Italy finally has its empire. [...] It is a Fascist empire, an empire of peace, an empire of civilization and humanity." Mussolini challenged the crowd, asking, "Will you be worthy of it?" to which the masses responded loudly, "Yes, yes!" He then pressed further, questioning, "Is this cry a sacred oath?" and again the crowd answered, "yes!" Continuing, he asked, "Is it an oath that binds you before God and man?" and received the same reply: "Yes." Finally, he demanded, "Is it an oath that binds you for life or death?" prompting another emphatic "Yes, yes." Concluding the exchange, Mussolini commanded, "Black Shirts and legionaries, salute the King." The crowd then gave an deafening ovation to the King and to Mussolini. The proclamation of the Empire was celebrated by millions all throughout Italy, church bells were rang jubilantly in all major cities and Pope Pius XI called the celebrations a "happy triumph of a good and great people".

== See also ==
- East African Campaign (World War II)
- Second Italo-Abyssinian War
- Timeline of the Second Italo-Abyssinian War
- Achille Starace
