= Ezio Rosi =

Italian general during World War II

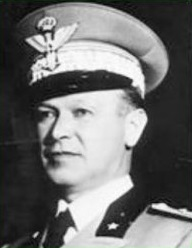

Chief of Staff of the Royal Italian Army
- In office 2 February 1943 – 18 May 1943
- Preceded by: Vittorio Ambrosio
- Succeeded by: Giuseppe De Stefanis

Personal details
- Born: 19 March 1881 Vicenza, Kingdom of Italy
- Died: 19 July 1963 (aged 82) Bologna, Italy
- Awards: Bronze Medal of Military Valour; Order of the Crown of Italy; Colonial Order of the Star of Italy; Military Order of Savoy

Military service
- Allegiance: Kingdom of Italy
- Branch/service: Royal Italian Army
- Rank: General
- Commands: 11th Artillery Regiment; 21st Infantry Division Granatieri di Sardegna; VI Army Corps; Sixth Army; Army Chief of Staff; Army Group East
- Battles/wars: World War I; Second Italo-Ethiopian War; World War II

Ezio Rosi (Vicenza, 19 March 1881 – Bologna, 5 January 1963) was an Italian general during World War II. He commanded the Sixth Army from 1941 to 1943, and after a brief period as Army Chief of Staff, he assumed command of Army Group East in 1943.

== Biography ==
Rosi was born in Vicenza on March 19, 1881, and after enlisting in the Royal Italian Army he attended the Application School of Artillery and Engineers in Turin, graduating as second lieutenant. He was promoted to lieutenant on September 1, 1903. He participated in the First World War, and on 29 April he was promoted to the rank of major; at the end of the war he held the rank of lieutenant colonel and had been awarded the title of Knight of the Order of the Crown of Italy Bronze Medal for Military Valour. On 19 May 1919 he was awarded the title of Knight of the Military Order of Savoy; after promotion to colonel he became commander of the 11th Artillery Regiment.

In August 1928 he was appointed chief of staff of the Military Command of Sicily. In 1935–1936, during the Second Italo-Ethiopian War, holding the rank of brigadier general he served as director general of Logistics Services at the Ministry of War, and at the end of the conflict he was promoted to the rank of major general for exceptional merits. Between the 1937 and 1938 he held the position of commander of the 21st Infantry Division Granatieri di Sardegna, succeeding General Carlo Geloso.

When the Kingdom of Italy entered World War II on 10 June 1940, Rosi assumed command of the VI Army Corps that was being raised in Bologna. On 15 February 1941 he was appointed commander of the Sixth Army, stationed in southern Italy, Sicily and Sardinia and tasked with coastal and territorial defense.

On 2 February 1943 Rosi became of Chief of Staff of the Army, replacing General Vittorio Ambrosio who had become Chief of the General Staff. He left the post in May, and on 1 June 1943 he assumed command of Army Group East, with headquarters in Tirana, composed of the Ninth Army (General Renzo Dalmazzo), stationed in Albania, and of the Eleventh Army (General Carlo Vecchiarelli), stationed in Greece. On 1 July 1943 he was promoted to full general, but in August the 11th Army was removed from his authority and transferred under the jurisdiction of General Alexander Löhr's Heeresgruppe E.

On 8 September he learned of the proclamation of the Armistice of Cassibile from the radio. He unsuccessfully tried to contact the Supreme Command, but did not receive any instructions about how to deal with the new situation until 00.30 on 9 September, when he received a brief and ambiguous telex which in its conclusion forbade any hostile initiative against German forces. Starting from 10 pm of that night he entered into negotiations with the commander of the 2nd Panzer Army, General Lothar Rendulic; the talks continued for two days and finally an agreement was reached with General Hans Bessel. The agreement stated that the troops under Rosi's command would be repatriated after handing over heavy and collective weapons to the Germans, whereas they would be allowed to retain light weapons. This agreement was reached at dawn on 11 September, but at eleven in the same morning German armored units under General Walter Gnamm surrounded Rosi's headquarters and captured him along with his entire staff. The General was taken to Belgrade and then to Vienna, while General Dalmazzo temporarily replaced him and ordered his troops to hand over all weapons to the Germans.

Refusing to collaborate, Rosi was imprisoned in officer POW Camp 64Z in Schokken, Poland, and later transferred to the punishment camp of Toruń for having maintained his strongly anti-German positions and for having refused to join the Italian Social Republic. He was later handed over to RSI authorities and tried by the Fascist Special Tribunal; the trial, which began on 28 January 1944, ended with his acquittal from all charges, and he was released from the Brescia prison in January 1945. However, given his personal anti-fascist and anti-German sentiments he was subjected to special surveillance measures, which ended on April 25, 1945, with the end of the war in Italy.

He died in Bologna on January 5, 1963.
