= Hoare–Laval Pact =

1935 proposed treaty

The Hoare–Laval Pact was a secret pact made in December 1935 between French Foreign Minister Pierre Laval and British Foreign Secretary Sir Samuel Hoare for ending the Second Italo-Ethiopian War. Italy wanted to incorporate the independent nation of Abyssinia (Ethiopia) into its Italian Empire and also avenge the 1896 Battle of Adwa, a humiliating defeat. The pact proposed to partition Abyssinia and thus partially achieve Italian dictator Benito Mussolini's goal of making Abyssinia an Italian colony.

When it was leaked, the proposal was met with outrage in Britain and France and never went into effect. Hoare and Laval were both sacked.

== Background ==
In 1935 the Abyssinian Crisis and Second Italo-Ethiopian War began. In the United Kingdom many people and the official opposition supported League of Nations sanctions against Fascist Italy, as did the Dominions. The government hoped that strong sanctions against Italy might discourage Nazi Germany from similar actions, and won the November general election with a pro-League platform.

On 8 December 1935, British Foreign Secretary Sir Samuel Hoare discussed with his French counterpart Pierre Laval (who was both Prime Minister and Foreign Minister) how to end the war. On 9 December British newspapers revealed leaked details of an agreement by the two men to give much of Ethiopia to Italy to end the war. The British Cabinet had not approved the preliminary plan, but decided to support it to not embarrass Hoare.

== Reaction ==
=== Britain ===
The pact was met with a wave of moral indignation in Britain. On 10 December the Opposition Labour Party claimed if the reports in the press of the contents of the Pact were true, the government had contradicted the pro-League policy on which it had just won the 1935 election.

The Conservatives dominated the government and cared little for opinion on the left. They paid attention, however, when attacks came from the right. In an editorial titled ‘A Corridor for Camels’, The Times on 16 December denounced the Pact and said there never was "the slightest doubt that British public opinion would recommend them for approval by the League as a fair and reasonable basis of negotiations". The Archbishop of Canterbury, Cosmo Lang, condemned the Pact in a letter to The Times, and many other bishops wrote directly to Stanley Baldwin to oppose it.

Duff Cooper, the Secretary of State for War, later wrote:

But before the Duce had time to declare himself there arose a howl of indignation from the people of Great Britain. During my experience of politics I have never witnessed so devastating a wave of public opinion. Even the easy-going constituents of the St. George's division were profoundly moved. The post-bag was full and the letters I received were not written by ignorant or emotional people but by responsible citizens who had given sober thought to the matter.

The Conservative Chief Whip told Baldwin: "Our men won't stand for it". Sir Austen Chamberlain in a speech to the Conservative Foreign Affairs Committee condemned the Pact and said: "Gentlemen do not behave in such a way". Harold Nicolson later wrote that he had had sleepless nights worrying whether he could keep his seat.

=== France ===
When the Chamber of Deputies debated the Pact on 27 and 28 December, the Popular Front condemned it, with Léon Blum telling Laval: "You have tried to give and to keep. You wanted to have your cake and eat it. You cancelled your words by your deeds and your deeds by your words. You have debased everything by fixing, intrigue and slickness.... Not sensitive enough to the importance of great moral issues, you have reduced everything to the level of your petty methods".

Yvon Delbos declared: "Your plan is dead and buried. From its failure, which is as total as possible, you could have – but you have not – drawn a personal conclusion. Two lessons emerge. The first is that you were in a dead end because you upset everyone without satisfying Italy. The second is that we must return to the spirit of the Covenant [of the League of Nations] by preserving agreement with the nations gathered at Geneva".

Paul Reynaud attacked the government for aiding Hitler by ruining the Anglo-French alliance. On the motion of censure, the French government had a majority of 296 votes to 276, with 37 Radicals voting for the government.

== Outcome ==
The British government withdrew the plan, and Hoare resigned. In early 1936 Italy began a new, larger advance using poison gas, and entered Addis Ababa on 5 May 1936.

== Historiography ==
A. J. P. Taylor argued that it was the event that "killed the League [of Nations]" and that the pact "was a perfectly sensible plan, in line with the League's previous acts of conciliation from Corfu to Manchuria" which would have "ended the war; satisfied Italy; and left Abyssinia with a more workable, national territory" but that the "common sense of the plan was, in the circumstances of the time, its vital defect".

The military historian Correlli Barnett has argued that if Britain alienated Italy, Italy "would be a potential enemy astride England's main line of imperial communication at a time when she was already under threat from two existing potential enemies at opposite ends of the line [Germany and Japan]. If – worse – Italy were to fight in a future war as an ally of Germany or Japan, or both, the British would be forced to abandon the Mediterranean for the first time since 1798". Therefore, in Barnett's view, it was "highly dangerous nonsense to provoke Italy" due to Britain's military and naval weakness and that therefore the pact was a sensible option.

== See also ==
- Italo–Ethiopian Treaty of 1928
