= XVII Army Corps (Italy) =

The XVII Army Corps (Italian: XVII Corpo d'Armata) was an army corps of the Royal Italian Army during World War II.

== History ==
On 11 November 1938 the Armored Corps (Corpo d'Armata Corazzato) was created in Mantua, with the motorized divisions "Po", "Trento" and the I and II Armored Brigades.
On 1 March 1941, the Armored Corps (Italian: Corpo d'Armata Corazzato) was part of the reserve Army of the Po, renamed XVII Army Corps and transferred to Albania on 4 April, in anticipation of operations against Yugoslavia. It then participated in the invasion of Yugoslavia (6–18 April 1941), where it conquered Dubrovnik, Podgorica and Trebinje.

After returning to Italy on 16 June 1941, the Corps assumed responsibility for the territorial defense of Lazio, from the borders of Tuscany to the mouth of the Garigliano river. It remained here until the Armistice of Cassibile in September 1943, when it was disarmed by the Germans in Velletri and dissolved on 9 September.

== Commanders ==
- Armored Corps
  - Fidenzio Dall'Ora (11.11.1938 – 25.07.1940)
  - Giuseppe Pafundi (25.07.1940 - 01.03.1941)
- XVII Army Corps
  - Giuseppe Pafundi (01.03.1941 - 01.05.1941)
  - Vittorio Sogno (02.05.1941 - 02.11.1941)
  - Alberto Barbieri (03.11.1941 - 14.07.1943)
  - Giovanni Zanghieri (15.07.1943 - 09.09.1943)
