= Enrico Caviglia =

Marshal of Italy

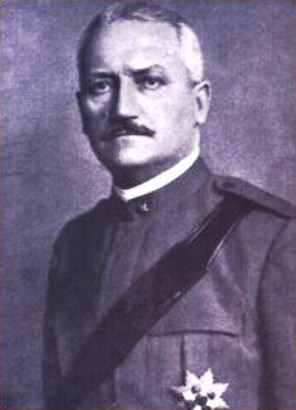
- Born: 4 May 1862; Finalmarina, Italy
- Died: 22 March 1945 (aged 82); Finale Ligure, Italy
- Military career
- Allegiance: Kingdom of Italy
- Branch: Royal Italian Army
- Service years: 1880–1926; 1943
- Rank: Marshal of Italy
- Commands: 29th Division; XXIV Corps; VIII Corps; X Corps; 8th Army
- Conflicts: Eritrea Campaign 1888-89; First Italo-Ethiopian War; Battle of Adowa; Russo-Japanese War (observer); Italo-Turkish War; World War I; Battles of the Isonzo; Eleventh Battle of the Isonzo; Battle of Caporetto; Second Battle of the Piave River; Battle of Vittorio Veneto; Bloody Christmas (1920); World War II; Defence of Rome
- Awards: Order of the Most Holy Annunciation; Military Order of Savoy; Silver Medal of Military Valor; Order of the Bath (Honorary)

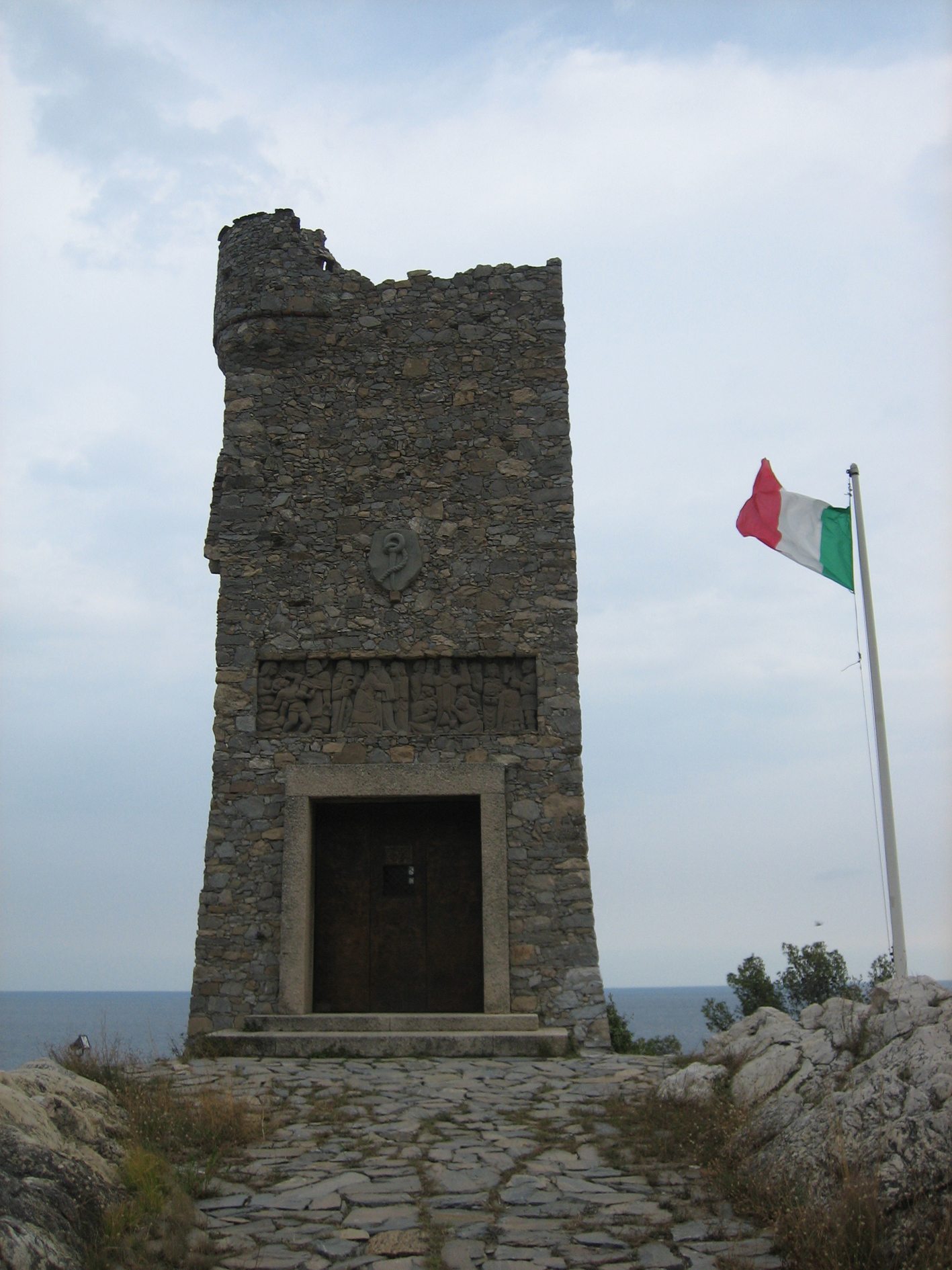
Mausoleum of Enrico Caviglia, Cape San Donato, Finale Ligure.

Enrico Caviglia KCB (4 May 1862 – 22 March 1945) was a distinguished officer in the Italian Army. Victorious on the bloody battlefields of the Great War, notably the Battle of Vittorio Veneto, he rose in time to the highest rank in his country, Marshal of Italy; he was also a Senator of the kingdom.

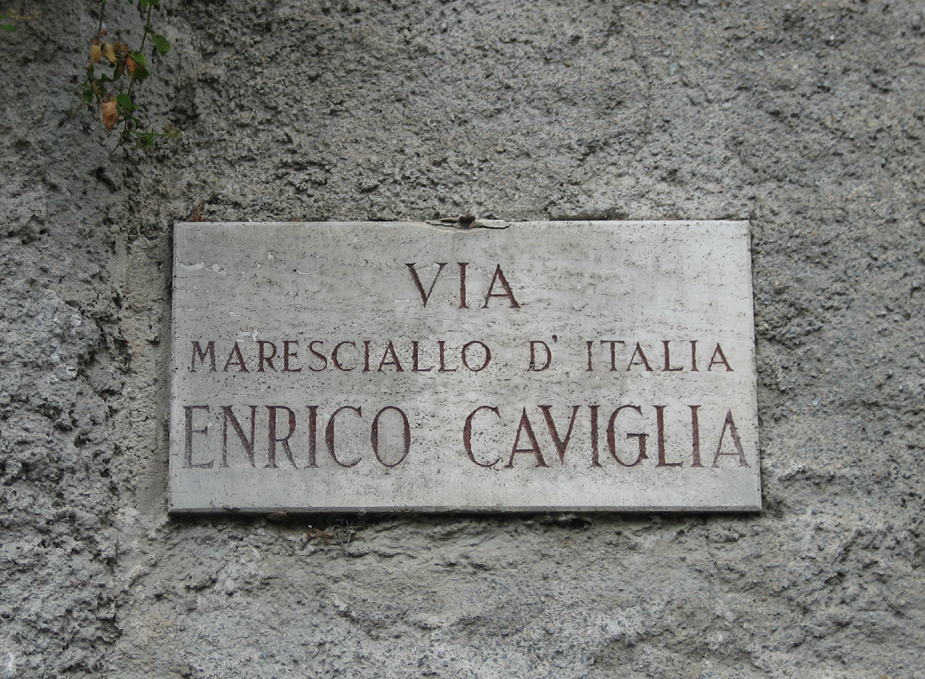
Via Enrico Caviglia in Finale Ligure.

== Early years ==
Caviglia was born in Finalmarina (the marine borough of Finale Ligure), the sixth son of Pietro Caviglia and Antonietta Saccone. After early studies in his hometown, in 1877 he gained admission to the military college "Teulié" in Milan. In 1880 he became a cadet in the Military Academy of Turin; three years later he received his first promotion to second lieutenant in the artillery corps.

Caviglia took part in the African campaign of 1888/89 in Eritrea as a First Lieutenant in the II Artillery Regiment; in 1891 he was admitted to the War School.The year 1893 saw him promoted to captain. In 1896 and 1897 he took part anew in the African campaign and was present when the Italian army suffered a dreadful defeat in the Battle of Adowa in Ethiopia.

By this time, he was known especially for the quality of his work in geography. After several other assignments, in 1904 he was appointed as extraordinary military attaché in Tokyo, Japan, where he was tasked with observing Japanese military operations in the Russo-Japanese War. From 1905 to 1911, he became the titular military attaché first in the Japanese capital, then in Beijing, China. On 22 September 1908 he was awarded the rank of lieutenant colonel and honorary field assistant to the king.

In 1912 Caviglia was sent to Tripolitania and Cyrenaica; his task was to oversee both the negotiations for the pullout of Turkish troops resulting from the Italo-Turkish War and the pacification of Arab and Berber chieftains. On 6 February 1913 he was appointed vice director of the Military Geographic Institute (IGM) in Florence, to reach the rank of colonel the next year.

== World War I ==
When in 1915 Italy entered the First World War against Austria-Hungary, Caviglia was made major general. Next year his troops distinguished themselves in the bloody battles of the Carso, where Caviglia led Brigade Bari in extremely harsh fights at Bosco Lancia and Bosco Cappuccio. Hence his being decorated with the Cross of Cavalier of the Military Order of Savoy "for the skill and valor he exhibited". On 14 June 1917 Caviglia was promoted to lieutenant general for his merits on the battlefield: in August, as commanding officer of
XXIV Army Corps, he overran the Austro-Hungarians on the Bainsizza plateau, the most brilliant Italian advance in the Eleventh Battle of the Isonzo.

After the disastrous Twelfth Battle of the Isonzo, in which he had no responsibility for the defeat, Caviglia received the Silver Medal for his skill in keeping his men united and disciplined throughout the retreat to the Piave line, contrary to what happened in large sectors of the Italian army. He was also transferred to serve as commander of
X Army Corps. September 1918 saw Caviglia being made a titular commander of army corps by war merits, and by November he had been put in charge of the new 8th Army, which decisively crushed the crumbling Austro-Hungarian forces at the Battle of Vittorio Veneto.

== Between the wars ==
After the war, King George V of Great Britain invested him as a Knight Commander of the Order of the Bath; Enrico Caviglia was now a Sir. On 22 February 1919 he was appointed Senator for life, and later took part in Vittorio Emanuele Orlando's first government as Minister of War. When Gabriele D'Annunzio occupied Fiume with his "legionnaires", Caviglia was called to replace general Pietro Badoglio, dating from 21 December 1920, as troop commander and extraordinary commissioner in the Venezia Giulia. From 24 to 31 December 1920 he led the repression of D'Annunzio's movement, the so-called Natale di sangue (Bloody Christmas) in execution of the Treaty of Rapallo. For the rest of his life Caviglia felt doubts as to the wisdom and morality of his actions during the repression; these doubts he expressed in his personal diary.

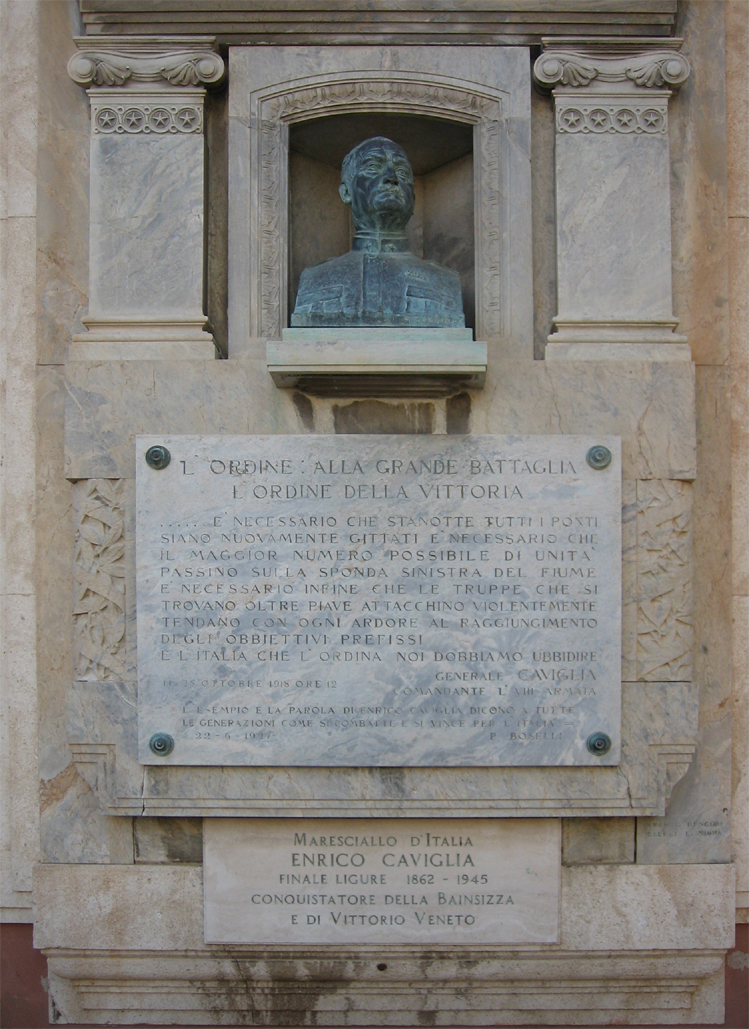
Monument to Generale Enrico Caviglia in Finale Ligure.

On 25 June 1926, Caviglia was appointed Marshal of Italy (Maresciallo d'Italia). This was the highest military rank in the Kingdom of Italy. Four years later, he was made a Cavalier in the Supreme Order of the Most Holy Annunciation (Ordine Supremo della Santissima Annunziata). Caviglia thus became a 'cousin' of King Victor Emmanuel III. Unenthusiastic about Benito Mussolini's policies, he was overshadowed by other officers, less able than he on the battlefield but more ideologically sympathetic to the Duce.

== World War II ==
In 1943, from 8 to 13 September, as the King's court fled the incoming Germans after surrendering the country to the Allies, the aged Caviglia had to take the military command in Rome and to negotiate with Field Marshal Albert Kesselring the surrender of the capital in exchange for the respect of its theoretical status as open city. By this time he had developed an intense dislike of Badoglio (who was defined by him once as "a barn dog that goes where there is the biggest morsel"), who had left him in dire straits thrice: in Caporetto (1917), in Fiume (1920) and then finally in Rome, benefiting in the meantime of the favors of the Fascist regime. Caviglia eventually retired to his villa, named Villa Vittorio Veneto, in Finale Ligure, to die just a month before the end of World War II. His body was interred in the Basilica of St. John the Baptist in Finale Ligure Marina, but on 22 June 1952, under the eyes of Luigi Einaudi, President of the Italian Republic, and former prime minister Vittorio Emanuele Orlando, his remains were finally reinterred in the tower of Capo San Donato, just east of Finale.

Caviglia left a diary, which documented the evolution of his thought on many subjects, his skepticism about the Fascist regime, his confusion about what was going on in World War II and the world that he could no longer recognize. He also left military memoirs and geographical treatises and works.

== Honors ==
- Supreme Knight of the Order of the Most Holy Annunciation
- Knight Grand Cross of the Military Order of Savoy
- Knight Commander of the Order of the Bath
