= Giovanni Zanghieri =

Italian army general (1881–1959)

Giovanni Zanghieri (24 December 1881 – 5 October 1959) was an Italian Lieutenant General who served during the Second World War from 1940 to 1943.

== Biography ==
Zanghieri was Commandant of the Central Artillery School between 1934 and 1937 and then Director of the Military Chemical Services.
Between 9 September 1937 and 18 September 1939, he was commander of the 22nd Infantry Division "Cacciatori delle Alpi"
On 1 November 1940, he took command of the II Army Corps, which was stationed in Alessandria.

In June 1942, Zanghieri and his II Corps were sent to the Russian front as part of the 8th Italian Army. Between 20 and 24 August if fought on the Don river. On 12 December 1942, Soviet forces began Operation Little Saturn and after resisting for a week, the Corps was forced to withdraw to Voroshilovgrad through the frozen steppe and suffered horrendous losses.
In 1943, the Corps withdrew further in the direction of Gomel, pursued by Soviet Cavalry. On 15 February 1943, Zanghieri was relieved of command and returned to Italy.
Kurt von Tippelskirch, German liaison officer to the Italian 8th Army, didn't have a very high opinion of Zanghieri. He regarded him as "completely useless and insignificant".

He remained without command until 15 July 1943 when he became commander of the XVII Army Corps, which defended the coast of Lazio.
His Corps was disarmed by the Germans in September 1943.
