= Giuseppe Pafundi =

Italian general

Giuseppe Pafundi (born 4 December 1883) was a general in the Royal Italian Army who commanded the XVII Corps during the World War II Axis invasion of Yugoslavia in April 1941.

== Career ==
Promotions

1934-09-05 Brigadier-General

1937-07-01 Major-General

Service

1926: Commanding Officer 63rd Infantry Regiment "Cagliari"

1933: Eritrea Commanding Officer 20th Brigade

1938–1939: General Officer Commanding 25th Infantry Division "Volturno"

1939–1940: General Officer Commanding 25th Infantry Division "Bologna"

1940–1941: General Officer Commanding XVII Corps

1941: General Officer Commanding Armoured Corps

1941–1942: General Officer Commanding VIII Corps
