= Mario Vercellino =

Italian general (1879–1961)

- Born: 10 February 1879; Asti, Kingdom of Italy
- Died: 11 July 1961 (aged 82); Sanremo, Italy
- Military career
- Allegiance: Kingdom of Italy
- Branch: Royal Italian Army
- Rank: General
- Commands: 1st Mountain Artillery Regiment; Servizio Informazioni Militare; 1st Infantry Division Superga; Turin Army Corps; Army of the Po; 9th Army; 4th Army
- Conflicts: Italo-Turkish War; World War I; World War II; Greco-Italian War; Operation Anton; Italian occupation of France; Operation Achse
- Awards: Order of Saints Maurice and Lazarus; Order of the Crown of Italy

Mario Vercellino (10 February 1879 – 11 July 1961) was an Italian general during World War II.

== Biography ==
Vercellino was born in Asti in 1879 and began his military career as artillery second lieutenant in 1898. After attending the War School of the Royal Italian Army he was transferred to the General Staff, and fought in Libya during the Italo-Turkish War. He then participated in the First World War, as commander of the 1st Mountain Artillery Regiment. From 1929 to 1931 he commanded the SIM, from 1932 to 1934 he commanded the artillery of the Alessandria Army Corps, in 1934 he became commander of the 1st Infantry Division Superga and on the following year he was given command of the War School and of the Turin Army Corps, which he held for five years.

In 1940 he became commander of the Army of the Po, which he still commanded when Italy entered World War II on 10 June. The Army was kept in reserve during the brief offensive against France; during this period Vercellino drafted Plan T1, for the invasion of Ticino, which however was never put into effect. In November 1940 he was made commander of the Ninth Army, deployed in Albania, participating in the Greco-Italian War. He left command of the Army in February 1941, when he became aide-de-camp to King Victor Emmanuel III.

In April 1941 he was given command of the Fourth Army, stationed in north-western Italy at the border with France. In November 1942 the Fourth Army occupied southern France during Operation Anton; afterwards, it was tasked with occupation duties in this region. Italian troops were seldom molested by the French Resistance, and Vercellino refused to cooperate with the Nazis in rounding up the Jews living in the occupied zone of France under their control, preventing them from deporting Jews in the Italian-occupied zone, which became a safe haven for tens of thousands of Jews fleeing from the German zone. German foreign minister Joachim von Ribbentrop complained to Mussolini that "Italian military circles... lack a proper understanding of the Jewish question."

In the late summer of 1943, owing to the deteriorating situation in Italy, a decision was made to repatriate the Fourth Army, handing over the occupation zone in France to the Germans. The withdrawal from France was underway when the Armistice of Cassibile was announced, on 8 September 1943, and German forces initiated Operation Achse; the Fourth Army, dispersed between France, Piedmont and Liguria, was attacked by the converging forces of Field Marshals Gerd von Rundstedt, from Provence, and Erwin Rommel, from Italy, gradually disintegrating between 9 and 11 September. Italian troops blew up part of the Fréjus tunnel and resisted in Nice, Grenoble, Chambery, Menton and on Mont Cenis, but were overwhelmed; part of the soldiers dispersed and tried to reach their homes, others decided to join the Germans, whereas sizeable groups chose to oppose the occupation and took to the mountains, where they joined groups of anti-fascist civilians and thus formed the first partisan groups in Piedmont. On 12 September, General Vercellino formally dissolved his Army, while General Raffaello Operti, in charge of the Intendency of the Army, secured the treasure of the Army, part of which would later be used to fund the Resistance. On the same day, Vercellino was captured by the Germans along with his staff and imprisoned initially in Toulon and later in Germany, where he was held as a prisoner till the end of the war.

He was released in 1945, and left the Army in the same year. He died in his home in Sanremo on 11 July 1961, due to heart failure.
