= Fidenzio Dall'Ora =

Italian politician

- Born: 20 February 1879; Salerno, Kingdom of Italy
- Died: 4 February 1961 (aged 81); Rome, Italy
- Military career
- Allegiance: Kingdom of Italy
- Branch: Royal Italian Army
- Rank: Lieutenant General
- Commands: 50th Infantry Regiment "Parma"; 23rd Infantry Brigade; 2nd Infantry Division Sforzesca; Armoured Corps
- Conflicts: Italo-Turkish War; World War I; Second Italo-Ethiopian War; March of the Iron Will; World War II
- Awards: Bronze Medal of Military Valor; War Merit Cross; Military Order of Savoy; Order of the Crown of Italy; Order of Saints Maurice and Lazarus; Colonial Order of the Star of Italy

Fidenzio Dall'Ora (20 February 1879 – 4 February 1961) was an Italian general during the interwar period and World War II. He was also a member of the Italian Senate from 1939 to 1945. His brother Giuseppe was also a general.

== Biography ==
He was born in Salerno on February 20, 1879, the son of Anselmo Dall'Ora, an infantry officer of the Royal Italian Army, and of Amalia Fiore. From an early age he followed in his father's footsteps by enlisting in the Army in September 1899. He served in Eritrea in 1905-1906, participated in the Italo-Turkish War in Libya between 1911 and 1913 and later participated in the First World War. In 1926 he commanded the 50th Infantry Regiment "Parma".

In March 1933 he was promoted to Brigadier General, assuming command of the 23rd Infantry Brigade; on the following year he became commander of the 2nd Infantry Division Sforzesca. In March 1935 he was sent to Ethiopia as quartermaster general with the task of preparing the logistics of the planned campaign against Ethiopia. During the conflict, in which he was promoted to Major General for war merit, he distinguished himself for the efficiency with which he managed the Intendency, succeeding, through the port of Massawa and the depots of Asmara, to keep five army corps simultaneously supplied with ammunition and food; his work was instrumental for the preparation and execution of the March of the Iron Will.

He was promoted to Lieutenant General for exceptional merits on July 31, 1938, assuming command of the Armoured Corps in November 1938 after a period at the Ministry of War. On October 12, 1939 he was appointed Senator of the Kingdom of Italy, being sworn in on the following December 21. He was a member of the Armed Forces Commission from January 1940 to February 1941 and at the same time an alternate member of the Appeal Commission of the High Court of Justice, a post he held until August 1943; in the same year he was a Member of the Commission for Public Works and Communications. Having left command of the Armoured Corps on 25 July 1940, during World War II he was attached to the Ministry of War from July 1940 to February 1942, when he retired from the Army.

At the end of the war he was deferred in August 1945 to the High Court of Justice for the Sanctions against Fascism, which sentenced him to forfait his seat as Senator on December 19, 1945. He died in Rome on February 4, 1961.
