= II Army Corps (Italy) =

Royal Italian Army unit from 1877 to 1943

- II Corpo d'Armata
- Active: 1877 – 12 September 1943
- Country: Italy
- Branch: Royal Italian Army
- Size: Corps
- Engagements: World War I: Third Battle of the Aisne; Second Battle of the Marne; Second Italo-Ethiopian War; World War II: Italian invasion of France; Operation Little Saturn; Operation Achse

The II Army Corps (Italian: II Corpo d'Armata) was a corps of the Royal Italian Army between 1877 and 1943.

== History ==
During World War I, it fought on the Western Front under General Alberico Albricci in 1918. It distinguished itself during the Third Battle of the Aisne and the Second Battle of the Marne, particularly at Bligny and on the sector Courmas – Bois du Petit Champ. The Corps contributed significantly to stopping the German offensive on Eparnay, which was aimed at outflanking Reims.

It took part in the Second Italo-Ethiopian War in 1935–1936 under General Pietro Maravigna.

During World War II, it took part in the Italian invasion of France in 1940 and fought on the Eastern Front in 1942–1943. The Corps suffered very heavy losses during Operation Little Saturn and was forced to retreat to Voroshilovgrad and from there to Gomel. Between 26 April and 22 May 1943, the remnants of the Corps were repatriated to Italy, to be reformed in Tuscany under the jurisdiction of the 5th Army.

After the announcement of the Armistice of Cassibile on 8 September 1943 the Corps was dissolved by invading German forces on 12 September 1943.

== Composition (Russia 1942-43) ==
- 2nd Infantry Division "Sforzesca" (Carlo Pellegrini),
- 3rd Infantry Division "Ravenna" (Francesco Du Pont),
- 5th Infantry Division "Cosseria" (Enrico Gazzale)

== Commanders during World War II ==
- Lieutenant General Francesco Bertini (1 July 1937 – 31 October 1940)
- Lieutenant General Giovanni Zanghieri (1 November 1940 – 15 February 1943)
- Lieutenant General Arnaldo Forgiero (15 March – 4 July 1943)
- Lieutenant General Vittorio Sogno (5 July – 4 September 1943)
- Lieutenant General Gervasio Bitossi (5–9 September 1943)
