= VIII Army Corps (Italy) =

Infantry corps in WWII

The VIII Army Corps (Italian: VIII Corpo d'Armata) was an infantry corps of the Royal Italian Army during World War II, when it participated in the Italian invasion of Albania, and the Greco-Italian War and the subsequent Italian occupation of Greece.

== History ==
Its origins lie in the 8th Army Corps Command based at Naples, formed as a territorial jurisdiction on 22 March 1877. Between 1927 and 1940, it was based in Rome as the Rome Army Corps (VIII) (Corpo d'Armata di Roma (VIII)).

With the Italian entry into World War II on 10 June 1940, VIII Army Corps was moved to Piedmont under the Seventh Army. Returning briefly to Rome, it was sent to Albania in early November 1940 to participate in the Greco-Italian War under the Eleventh Army.

During January and February 1941, the corps held a front sector at Tepeleni. It took part in the failed Italian Spring Offensive in March, and in the Italian advance once the Greek retreat began in mid-April as a result of the German invasion of Greece. after the Greek capitulation, the corps was moved into Greece in May.

VIII Corps remained in Greece on occupation duties, still under Eleventh Army command, with its headquarters at Xylokastro, until the Italian armistice in September 1943, when it was disbanded.

== Orders of battle ==
=== 1926–1940 ===
- 21st Rome Infantry Division, later renamed Granatieri di Sardegna
- 22nd Perugia Infantry Division, later renamed Cacciatori delle Alpi

=== 1940–1943 ===
- 29th Piemonte Infantry Division
- 51st Siena Infantry Division
- 56th Casale Infantry Division
- 59th Cagliari Infantry Division

== Commanders (1940–1943) ==
- Generale di divisione Emilio Bancale (1940–41)
- Generale di divisione Gastone Gambara (1941)
- Generale di divisione Matteo Negro (1941)
- Generale di Corpo d'Armata Giuseppe Pafundi (1941–42)
- Generale di Corpo d'Armata Mario Marghinotti (1942–43)
