= Italo-Ethiopian Treaty of 1928 =

1928 treaty between Italy and Ethiopia

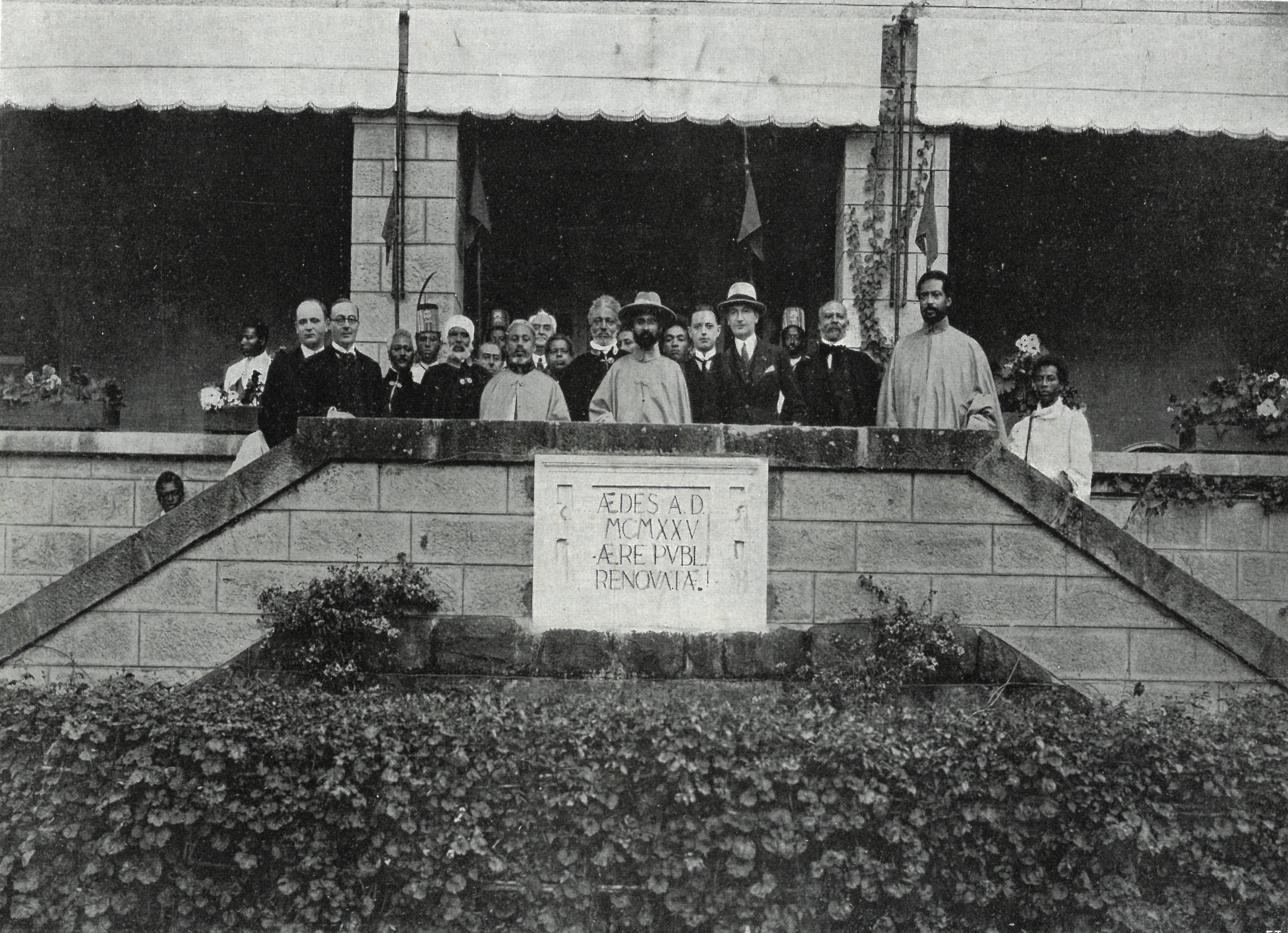
Addis Ababa, Aug. 2, 1928, Ambassador Giuliano Cora (fourth from right in front row) and a few staff members on the steps of Villa Italia, with Ethiopian Regent Ras Tafari (center front row), at the signing of the Treaty of Bilateral Friendship, after the official breakfast. The plaque commemorates the recently completed renovations. (from "Diplomatic Imagery" by Stefano Baldi)

The Italo-Ethiopian Treaty of 1928, also known as the Italo–Ethiopian Treaty of Friendship and Arbitration, was a treaty signed between Italy and Ethiopia on 2 August 1928. Nigiste Negest (Note: Usually translated as Queen of Kings or Empress.) Zewditu I ruled Ethiopia at the time of this treaty, but it was the 36-year-old Ras (Note: Roughly equivalent to Duke.) Tafari Makonnen who represented the government of Ethiopia. Tafari, who was still in his minority, was heir apparent and Regent Plenipotentiary.

Within two months, on 7 October 1928, Ras Tafari would be proclaimed Negus. (Note: Usually translated as King.) A little over two years later, on 2 November 1930, Zewditu had died and Tafari was proclaimed Nəgusä Nägäst (Note: Usually translated as King of Kings or Emperor.) Haile Selassie I.

== Background ==
In 1926, Italy and the United Kingdom attempted a joint commercial penetration of the Ethiopian Empire. By bringing joint pressure upon Ras Tafari, the Italians planned to exploit a railway, and the British hoped to construct a mighty water works for irrigating the Anglo-Egyptian Sudan. Tafari yielded momentarily but made a protest to the League of Nations that was so potent that British public opinion turned against the water works scheme, and it was cancelled. That left the Italians in the lurch.

Rather than giving up his own plans, the Italian dictator, Benito Mussolini, enlisted the aid of King Victor Emmanuel's cousin, Prince Luigi Amedeo, Duke of the Abruzzi. In 1928, with pomp and panoply, the Duke and a following of royal proportions crossed the Mediterranean, sailed down the eastern coast of Africa and then struck inland to Ethiopia and its remote capital, Addis Ababa. The Duke thawed the suspicious Tafari's reservations by giving him a large Isotta Fraschini limousine, a luxurious Italian product that then sold in the United States for some $18,000 (equivalent to US$330,000 in 2024), along with many other gifts.

== Terms ==
The treaty declared a 20-year friendship between the two nations, access to the sea for Ethiopia, a road for Italy and an agreement to settle future disagreements through the League of Nations. Also, the treaty provided a concession to Ethiopia at the Red Sea port of Asseb in the Italian colony of Eritrea, called for both nations to co-operate in building a road between Asseb and Dessie and made the border between Italian Somaliland and Ethiopia 21 leagues parallel to the Benadir coast (approximately 57.5 mi).

== Aftermath ==
Both sides were at cross purposes when they approached the Italo-Ethiopian Treaty of 1928. Mussolini wanted the treaty to be a vehicle to allow Italy to penetrate Ethiopia economically and never intended to approach the League of Nations for arbitration. Meanwhile, Ras Tafari wanted arbitration but never intended to allow the Italian road from the sea to be built. He considered the road from Asseb to be a natural invasion route.

== See also ==
- Italian Colonial Empire
- Abyssinia Crisis
- Second Italo-Ethiopian War
- League of Nations
- Prince Luigi Amedeo, Duke of the Abruzzi

== Notes ==
Footnotes

Citations
