= Cristiana Sogno =

Cristiana Sogno (born 1969) is a Classicist and Professor in the English Department at Fordham University, New York. Her research focuses on letter-writing, biography, and the reception and adaptation of Greek and Latin texts.

== Education ==
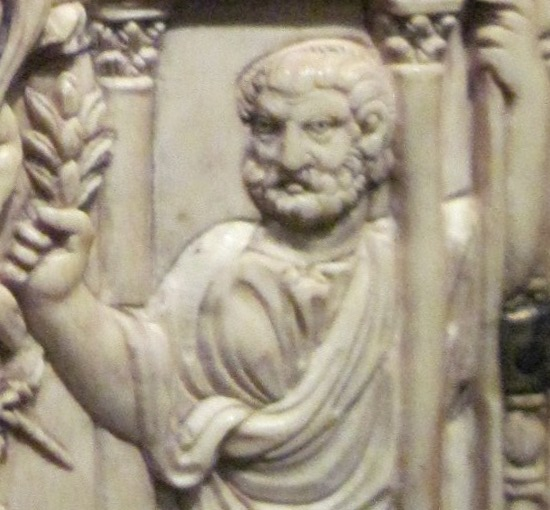
Probable depiction of Q. Aurelius Symmachus from an ivory diptych depicting his apotheosis.

Sogno received her PhD from Yale University in 2002. Her doctoral thesis was Q. Aurelius Symmachus: A Political Career Between Senate and Court. The ancient historian John F. Matthews supervised her thesis.

== Career and research ==
Sogno published her PhD thesis as a book, Q. Aurelius Symmachus: A Political Biography, with the University of Michigan Press in 2006. In 2010, she co-edited the volume From the Tetrarchs to the Theodosians: Later Roman History and Culture, 284-450 CE, edited with Scott McGill and Edward Watts. This is a Festschrift to celebrate the seventieth birthday of John Matthews. Sogno has published extensively on letter writing and letter collections from antiquity. In 2016 she published A Critical Introduction and Reference Guide to Letter Collections in Late Antiquity, co-ed with Bradley Storin and Edward Watts.

== Bibliography ==
- Formisano, Marco and Cristiana Sogno. "Origins and Original Moments in Late Greek and Latin Texts." Arethusa, vol. 54 no. 3, 2021, p. 269-273
- 'A Critique of Curiosity: Magic and Fiction in Apuleius’ Metamorphoses', Cultural Crossroads in the Ancient Novel, edited by B. MacQueen, D. Konstan, M. Futre-Pinheiro (2017)
- A Critical Introduction and Reference Guide to Letter Collections in Late Antiquity, co-ed with B. Storin and E. Watts (2016)
- 'The Ways of veritas: Historiography, Panegyric, Knowledge', co-authored with M. Formisano, in Spätantike Konzeptionen von Literatur, edited by J. Stenger
- Ebbeler, Jennifer V. & Sogno, Cristiana (2007). 'Religious Identity and the Politics of Patronage: Symmachus and Augustine', História 56 (2) 230-242
