= 9th Army (Italy) =

9ª Armata 9th Army
- Active: 1 June 1918 – 15 February 1919; 9 November 1940 – 19 September 1943
- Country: Kingdom of Italy
- Branch: Royal Italian Army
- Type: Infantry
- Size: Field Army
- Engagements: World War I: Second Battle of the Piave River; Battle of Vittorio Veneto; World War II: Invasion of Greece; Invasion of Yugoslavia

The 9th Army (Italian: 9ª Armata) was a World War I and World War II field army of the Royal Italian Army.

== World War I ==
After the Battle of Caporetto (November 1917) the Italian Army was completely reorganized by Armando Diaz. The new 9th Italian Army was formed under command of Paolo Morrone.
It consisted of:

- two army corps
- one cavalry corps
- the 6th Czechoslovak Division

It participated as reserve in the successful battles of the Piave River (June 1918) and Vittorio Veneto (October–November 1918).

== World War II ==
It was involved in the abortive Italian invasion of Greece in 1940, and the invasion of Yugoslavia in 1941. It then became the Italian garrison of the occupied or annexed territories of the Kingdom of Albania and the Italian governorate of Montenegro until the Italian surrender in 1943.

Its commanders were

- Mario Vercellino (1940–1941)
- Alessandro Pirzio Biroli (1941 - July 1943)
- Renzo Dalmazzo (July 1943 - September 1943)
