= Marshal of Italy =

Rank in the Royal Italian Army

Marshal of Italy Maresciallo d'Italia (Italian)
- Army rank flag

- Marshal of Italy sleeve rank insignia (1933–45)
- Country: Kingdom of Italy
- Service branch: Royal Italian Army; Regia Aeronautica
- Formation: 4 November 1924
- Abolished: 18 January 1947
- Next higher rank: First Marshal of the Empire
- Next lower rank: Army general
- Equivalent ranks: Grand admiral Marshal of the air force

Marshal of Italy (Italian: Maresciallo d'Italia) was a rank in the Royal Italian Army (Regio Esercito). Originally created in 1924 by Italian dictator Benito Mussolini for the purpose of honoring generals Luigi Cadorna and Armando Diaz, the rank was granted to several other general officers from 1926 to 1943. The rank was the highest in the Italian Army prior to the creation of the rank of First Marshal of the Empire in 1938. The rank of Marshal of Italy was abolished in 1946 with the creation of the Italian Republic. The equivalent Royal Navy (Regia Marina) rank was Grand admiral (Grande Ammiraglio), while the equivalent Air Force (Regia Aeronautica) rank was Marshal of the Air (Maresciallo dell'Aria).

The rank was formally abolished on 18 January 1947 by the Provisional Head of State Enrico de Nicola.

== List of the Marshals of Italy ==
Portrait	Name	Date of promotion	Military	Notes	Chief of the General Staff	Chief of Staff
	Luigi Cadorna (1850–1928)	4 November 1924	Army			1914–17
	Armando Diaz (1861–1928)	4 November 1924	Army			1917–19
	Paolo Thaon di Revel (1859–1948)	4 November 1924	Navy			
	Prince Emanuele Filiberto, Duke of Aosta (1869–1931)	25 June 1926	Army			
	Pietro Badoglio (1871–1956)	25 June 1926	Army	Succeeded Mussolini as prime minister in 1943, following the fall of the Fascist regime	1925–40	1919–21, 1925–27
	Enrico Caviglia (1862–1945)	25 June 1926	Army			
	Gaetano Giardino (1864–1935)	25 June 1926	Army			
	Guglielmo Pecori Giraldi (1856–1941)	25 June 1926	Army			
	Italo Balbo (1896–1940)	13 August 1933	Air Force	Co-leader of the 1922 March on Rome. Marshal of the Royal Italian Air Force; died in 1940 in a friendly fire incident over Tobruk		
	Emilio De Bono (1866–1944)	16 November 1935	Army	Co-leader of the 1922 March on Rome		
	Rodolfo Graziani (1882–1955)	9 May 1936	Army	After the Armistice of Cassibile, commanded the National Republican Army		1939–41
	Ugo Cavallero (1880–1943)	1 July 1942	Army		1941–43	
	Ettore Bastico (1876–1972)	12 August 1942	Army	Governor-General of Italian Libya. Commander-in-chief of Axis forces in the North African campaign; promoted to have rank equal to field marshal Erwin Rommel		
	Umberto, Prince of Piedmont (1904–1983)	29 October 1942	Army	Later King Umberto II		
	Giovanni Messe (1883–1968)	12 May 1943	Army		1943–45	

== Gallery ==
Social Republic

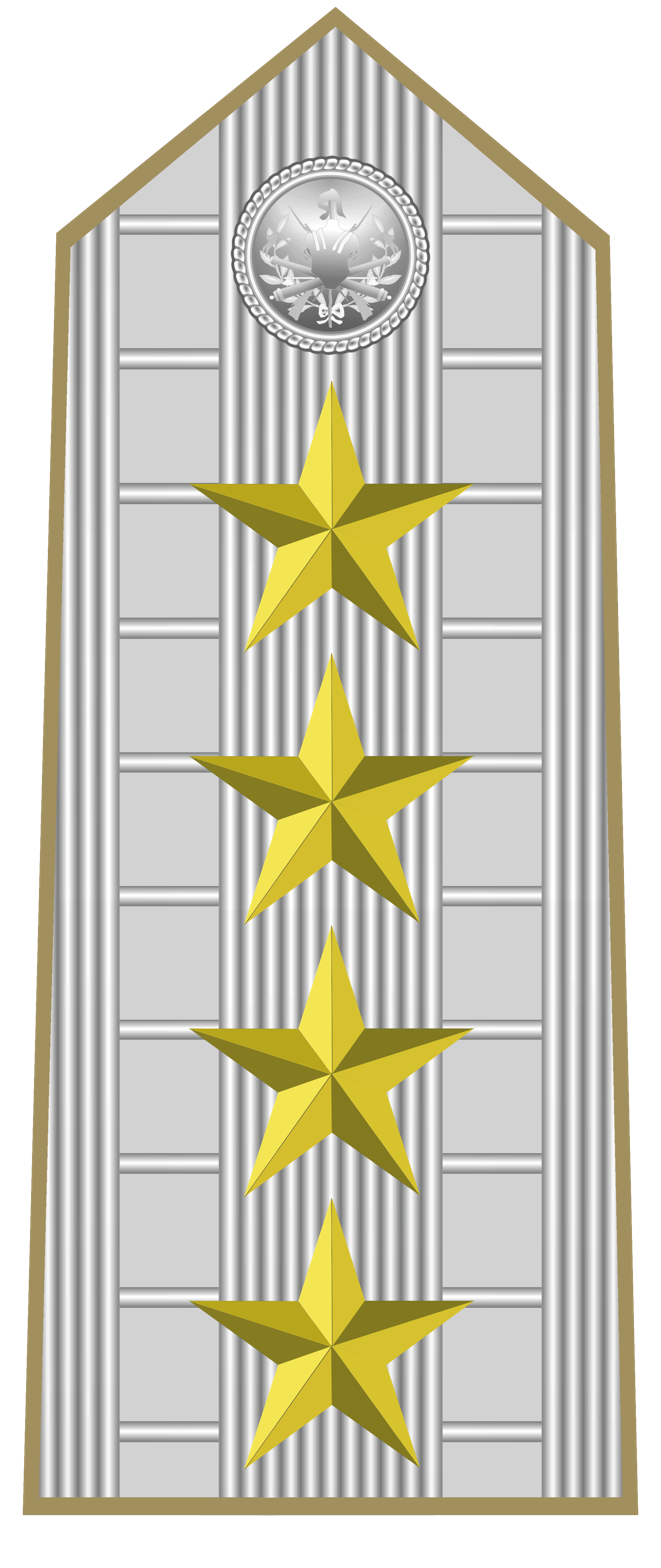
1945–1947

== See also ==
- Marshal (Italy) – an intermediate rank between sergeants and officers.
- First marshal of the empire
- Military ranks of the Kingdom of Italy
- Italo Balbo – Marshal of the Air Force
- Paolo Thaon di Revel – Grand Admiral
