= List of shipwrecks in December 1944 =

The list of shipwrecks in December 1944 includes ships sunk, foundered, grounded, or otherwise lost during December 1944.

== 1 December ==
List of shipwrecks: 1 December 1944
Ship	State	Description
AF 4	Kriegsmarine	The Artilleriefährprahm, a converted Type A Marinefährprahm, was sunk.
AF 11	Kriegsmarine	World War II: The Artilleriefährprahm struck a mine and sank in the Ems.
HMS Empire Dace	Royal Navy	World War II: The ferry (716 GRT, 1942) struck a mine and sank in the Gulf of Patras off Missolonghi, Greece. 20 crew, 2 gunners and 56 British troops were killed.
Korsvik	Kriegsmarine	World War II: The refrigerated cargo ship (1,183 GRT, 1883) was torpedoed and sunk in the Skaggerak by Allied aircraft with the loss of 82 lives.
Saar	Germany	World War II: The fishing trawler was shelled and sunk in the Baltic Sea by K-51 (Soviet Navy).

== 2 December ==
List of shipwrecks: 2 December 1944
Ship	State	Description
Akikawa Maru	Japan	World War II: Convoy MI-29: The Standard 2AT tanker (a.k.a. Awagawa Maru) was torpedoed and sunk in the East China Sea west of Yakushima Island (30°24′N 128°17′E) by USS Sea Devil (United States Navy). A total of 249 troops, seven guards and eighteen crewmen were killed. One hundred and eighty-six survivors were rescued by Konan Maru No. 1 (Japan). Seventy-nine other survivors in the No. 2 lifeboat drifted ashore on Suwanosejima on 3 December. Later, two died on the island.
Hawaii Maru	Imperial Japanese Army	World War II: Convoy MI-29: The Hawaii Maru-class transport was torpedoed and sunk in the East China Sea west of Yakushima Island (30°24′N 128°17′E) by USS Sea Devil (United States Navy). Lost with all hands; 1,843 troops of the Imperial Japanese Army 23rd Infantry Division, 60 other troops, 83 gunners and 148 crewmen were killed. 60 explosive motor boats aboard were also lost.
Kong Halfdan	Norway	World War II: The cargo ship (1,463 GRT, 1923) struck a mine and sank in the Baltic Sea off Stora Pölsan, Sweden (57°46′N 11°24′E). All crew survived.
HMS Northcoates	Royal Navy	World War II: The magnetic minesweeping Castle-class trawler (277 GRT, 1919) foundered in heavy weather in the English Channel (51°49′N 05°11′W) while under tow due to engine failure.
Seeburg	Kriegsmarine	World War II: The target ship was torpedoed and sunk by Shch-407 (Soviet Navy) in the Baltic Sea off Gotenhafen (54°39′N 18°39′E). Raised in 1954 and rebuilt for Polish service as Jastarnia.
142	Imperial Japanese Navy	World War II: The communications vessel was torpedoed and sunk in the Indian Ocean by HMS Sturdy (Royal Navy).

== 3 December ==
List of shipwrecks: 3 December 1944
Ship	State	Description
CD-64	Imperial Japanese Navy	World War II: Convoy HI-83: The Type D escort ship was torpedoed and sunk in the South China Sea east of Hainan, China (18°36′N 111°54′E) by USS Pipefish (United States Navy). Her captain and 184 crew members were lost.
USS Cooper	United States Navy	World War II: Battle of Ormoc Bay: The Allen M. Sumner-class destroyer was torpedoed and sunk in Ormoc Bay, Leyte, Philippines (10°54′N 124°36′E) by Take (Imperial Japanese Navy) with the loss of 191 of her 357 crew.
Cornwallis	Canada	World War II: The cargo ship (5,458 GRT, 1921) was torpedoed and sunk in the Gulf of Maine 10 nautical miles (19 km) off Mount Desert Island, Maine, United States (43°59′N 68°20′W) by U-1230 (Kriegsmarine) with the loss of 43 of her 48 crew. Survivors were rescued by the fishing vessel Notre Dame (United States).
Francis Asbury	United States	World War II: The Liberty ship struck a mine and was damaged in the North Sea (51°21′N 3°00′E). Of her 41-man merchant complement and 28-man armed guard, 9 of the former and 6 of the latter were killed. Forty-six from both groups were injured, and one merchant sailor and one armed guard died later of their injuries. She drifted aground off Ostend, Belgium, where she was sunk by gunfire as a menace to navigation.
Kuwa	Imperial Japanese Navy	World War II: Battle of Ormoc Bay: The Matsu-class destroyer was shelled and sunk in Ormoc Bay by USS Allen M. Sumner, USS Cooper and USS Moale (all United States Navy). About half her crew was lost.
Revoljucija	Soviet Union	World War II: Convoy KB 35: The cargo ship was torpedoed and sunk in the Barents Sea (68°44′N 37°49′E) by U-1163 (Kriegsmarine) with the loss of all 23 crew.
Shoei Maru No. 8 Go	Imperial Japanese Navy	The auxiliary patrol ship was lost on this date.
TID 44	United Kingdom	The TID-class tug sank a Portsmouth, Hampshire whilst assisting a Landing Ship, Tank. She was refloated on 16 March 1945. Subsequently repaired and returned to service.

== 4 December ==
List of shipwrecks: 4 December 1944
Ship	State	Description
Dirschau	Germany	World War II: The cargo ship was struck a mine and sank in the Baltic Sea off Leba, Pomerania (54°47′N 17°28′E).
Hakko Maru	Japan	World War II: The Imperial Japanese Army-chartered Standard Merchant 1TL-class tanker was torpedoed and sunk in the South China Sea west of Palawan Island (13°12′N 116°37′E) by USS Flasher (United States Navy). Twenty-four passengers and 24 crewmen were killed. Survivors were rescued by CD-17 and Yurishima (both Imperial Japanese Navy).
Kishinami	Imperial Japanese Navy	World War II: The Yūgumo-class destroyer was torpedoed and sunk in the South China Sea west of Palawan Island (13°12′N 116°37′E) by USS Flasher (United States Navy) with the loss of 90 of her 240 crew. Survivors were rescued by CD-17 and Yurishima (both Imperial Japanese Navy).
SS 6 and SS 9	Imperial Japanese Navy	World War II: The SS-class landing ships were sunk by US aircraft near Mindoro.

== 5 December ==
List of shipwrecks: 5 December 1944
Ship	State	Description
Albert Janus	Germany	World War II: Convoy BE-1075-AL: The cargo ship was sunk in Ørstafjorden, Norway, by de Havilland Mosquito aircraft of 143, 235 and 248 Squadrons, Royal Air Force. Three crewmen were killed.
Antoine Saugrain	United States	World War II: The Liberty ship was torpedoed and damaged in Leyte Gulf by Japanese aircraft. She was taken in tow but was torpedoed again on 6 December and sank. A total of 376 troops, 26 gunners, and 42 crewmen were rescued by USS San Pedro, USS Coronado, (both United States Navy), and USAS LT-454 (United States Army).
BO-230	Soviet Navy	World War II: The BO-201-class submarine chaser was torpedoed and sunk in the Barents Sea (69°29′N 35°12′E) by U-365 (Kriegsmarine) with the loss of all hands.
HMS Cyrus	Royal Navy	The unmanned Cybele-class mine destructor vessel (3,980 t, 1944) was wrecked in the Seine Estuary after breaking her tow.
Hira	Imperial Japanese Navy	World War II: The river gunboat was bombed and severely damaged by Nationalist Chinese aircraft after running aground near Anking, China (30°30′N 117°00′E). She was scrapped in July 1945.
Hozu	Imperial Japanese Navy	World War II: The Seta-class gunboat was bombed and sunk by Chinese aircraft after running aground near Anking, China (30°30′N 117°00′E).
Hozu Maru No. 16	Imperial Japanese Navy	World War II: The picket ship was damaged in an air attack at Rabaul, New Guinea and beached in Karavia Bay. Salvaged post war by HMAS Reserve and used as a tender at Madang.
HMS LCT-328	Royal Navy	World War II: The LCT Mk 3-class landing craft tank (350/625 t, 1942) was sunk by a mine off Missolonghi, Greece. Two crew and 13 Indian soldiers were killed.
USS LSM-20	United States Navy	USS LSM-20 World War II: The landing ship medium was sunk in the Philippine Sea off Leyte, Philippines by a Japanese kamikaze aircraft attack. Five sailors were killed and another nine were wounded. Survivors were rescued by USS Flusser (United States Navy).
USS LSM-149	United States Navy	The landing ship medium was lost by grounding in the Philippines, or off Sansapor, New Guinea.
Lapwing	United States	The oil vessel was wrecked on the beach 500 feet (150 m) from the jetty at Fort McRee, Florida, at the mouth of Pensacola Bay.
Proletarij	Soviet Navy	World War II: Convoy PK 20: The cargo ship was torpedoed and sunk in the Barents Sea 15 nautical miles (28 km) north of Tsyp-Navolok Cape (69°57′N 32°53′E) by U-995 (Kriegsmarine) with the loss of 29 of her 56 crew. Survivors were rescued by MO-426 (Soviet Navy).
Radbod	Germany	World War II: The cargo ship was bombed and sunk by Allied aircraft off Ålesund, Norway.
T-82	Soviet Navy	The auxiliary minesweeper sank on this date.
T-377	Soviet Navy	The Type MT-1 minesweeper sank in an accident in the Gulf of Riga.

== 6 December ==
List of shipwrecks: 6 December 1944
Ship	State	Description
AF 27	Kriegsmarine	The Artilleriefährprahm, a converted Type C Marinefährprahm, was wrecked. Salvaged by the Soviets.
Banshu Maru No. 31	Japan	World War II: Convoy TAMA-34: The transport was torpedoed and sunk in the South China Sea west of Dalupiri Island (18°45′N 120°49′E). All 23 crewmen were killed.
HMS Bullen	Royal Navy	World War II: The Captain-class frigate (1,432/1,823 t, 1943) was torpedoed and sunk in the Atlantic Ocean off Cape Wrath, Sutherland (58°30′N 5°03′W) by U-775 (Kriegsmarine) with the loss of 71 of her 168 crew.
Fukuyo Maru	Imperial Japanese Army	World War II: Convoy TAMA-34: The Daifuku Maru No. 1-class transport was torpedoed, blew up and sank in the South China Sea north of Bagui Bay, Luzon, Philippines (30°24′N 128°17′E) by USS Trepang (United States Navy). A total of 913 naval personnel, 66 gunners and 94 crewmen were killed.
Jinyo Maru	Japan	World War II: Convoy TAMA-34: The transport was torpedoed and sunk in the South China Sea north of Bagui Bay, Luzon (18°30′N 121°57′E) by USS Trepang (United States Navy). A total of 1,383 troops and 44 crewmen were killed.
Shinto Maru	Japan	World War II: The cargo ship was torpedoed and sunk in the South China Sea by USS Segundo (United States Navy).
U-297	Kriegsmarine	World War II: The Type VIIC/41 submarine was depth charged and sunk in the Atlantic Ocean 16 nautical miles (30 km) west of Yesnaby, Orkney Islands, United Kingdom by a Short Sunderland aircraft of 201 Squadron, Royal Air Force with the loss of all 50 crew.
Yasukuni Maru	Japan	World War II: Convoy TAMA-34: The Yasukuni Maru-class ore carrier was torpedoed and damaged in the South China Sea north of Bagui Bay, Luzon (18°30′N 121°57′E) by USS Segundo (United States Navy). Torpedoed and damaged again on 7 December by USS Razorback (United States Navy). She was beached and abandoned on Fugo Island 37 miles (60 km) north of Cape Mayraira (18°59′N 120°56′E). Three troops and 25 crewmen killed. The ship was bombed and destroyed by United States Navy carrier aircraft on 15 December.
USS YCF-42	United States Navy	The car float broke in two and sank in the Atlantic Ocean off Cape Lookout, North Carolina.

== 7 December ==
List of shipwrecks: 7 December 1944
Ship	State	Description
Akagisan Maru	Imperial Japanese Army	World War II: Convoy TA-8: The Akagisan Maru-class transport was beached at San Isidro, Leyte, Philippines (11°23′N 124°23′E) to facilitate landing of troops. She was bombed and destroyed by United States Fifth Air Force aircraft and Vought F4U Corsair aircraft of squadrons VMF 211, 218, and 313, United States Marine Corps. All 69 gunners and 58 crewmen were killed.
BO-229	Soviet Navy	World War II: The BO-201-class submarine chaser was torpedoed and sunk in the Barents Sea (69°28′N 34°19′E) by U-997 (Kriegsmarine) with the loss of 23 of her 36 crew. Survivors were rescued by BO-227 (Soviet Navy).
Ditmar Koel	Germany	World War II: Convoy BE-1081-ST: The cargo ship was torpedoed and sunk in Bjørnafjorden, Norway by HNoMS MTB 653 and HNoMS MTB 717 (both Royal Norwegian Navy). 36 crew were killed.
Edwin A. Robinson	United States	World War II: The Liberty ship struck a mine in the Scheldt off Blankenberge, West Flanders, Belgium. She was scuttled by Allied warships.
Hakuba Maru	Imperial Japanese Army	World War II: Convoy TA-8: The transport was beached at San Isidro, (11°23′N 124°23′E) to facilitate landing of troops. She was bombed and destroyed by United States Fifth Air Force aircraft and Vought F4U Corsair aircraft of squadrons VMF 211, 218, and 313, United States Marine Corps.
Kenjo Maru	Japan	World War II: Convoy TAMA-34: The transport was torpedoed and sunk in the South China Sea east of Camiguin, the Philippines (18°52′N 121°57′E) by USS Razorback and USS Segundo (both United States Navy).
USS LSM-318	United States Navy	World War II: The landing ship medium was sunk by a Japanese kamikaze aircraft in Ormoc Bay, Leyte, the Philippines. Two crew were killed and about ten wounded.
USS Mahan	United States Navy	World War II: The Mahan-class destroyer was damaged in the Camotes Sea by a Japanese kamikaze aircraft and was abandoned. She was scuttled by USS Walke (United States Navy). Six crewmen were missing and 13 were seriously wounded.
Nichiyo Maru	Imperial Japanese Army	World War II: Convoy TA-8: The Type 1A Standard cargo ship was beached at San Isidro, Leyte (11°23′N 124°23′E) to facilitate landing of troops. She was bombed and destroyed by United States Fifth Air Force aircraft and Vought F4U Corsair aircraft of squadrons VMF 211, 218, and 313, United States Marine Corps.
Nordenham	Kriegsmarine	World War II: The cargo ship was torpedoed by Shch-309 (Soviet Navy) in the Baltic Sea off Ventspils, Latvia (57°24′N 22°00′E), and was beached near Hanko, Finland. She sank on 9 December.
Samsip	United Kingdom	World War II: The Liberty ship (7,219 GRT, 1943) struck a mine and was damaged in the Scheldt, Belgium. The wreck was scuttled by a Royal Navy ship. Six crew were killed.
Shinsei Maru No. 5	Imperial Japanese Army	World War II: Convoy TA-8: The transport was beached at San Isidro, Leyte (11°23′N 124°23′E) to facilitate landing of troops. She was bombed and destroyed by United States 5th Air Force fighter-bomber aircraft, and United States Marine Corps Vought F4U Corsair aircraft of squadrons VMF 211, 218, and 313.
Shirouma Maru	Imperial Japanese Army	World War II: Convoy TA-8: The transport was beached at San Isidro, Leyte, Philippines (11°23′N 124°23′E) to facilitate landing of troops. She was bombed and destroyed by United States Fifth Air Force aircraft and Vought F4U Corsair aircraft of squadrons VMF 211, 218, and 313, United States Marine Corps.
T-11	Imperial Japanese Navy	World War II: Convoy TA-8: The No.1-class landing ship (high speed transport) was beached at San Isidro 30 miles (48 km) north of Ormoc, the Philippines (11°23′N 124°23′E) to facilitate landing of troops. She was bombed and destroyed by United States Fifth Air Force aircraft and Vought F4U Corsair aircraft of squadrons VMF 211, 218, and 313, United States Marine Corps.
V 1606 Julius Fock	Kriegsmarine	World War II: The Vorpostenboot was torpedoed and sunk in the Baltic Sea off Steinort, Pomerania by Soviet Douglas A-20 Havoc aircraft. 13 crewmen killed.
USS Ward	United States Navy	USS Ward World War II: The Wickes-class destroyer was hit by a Japanese kamikaze aircraft in Ormoc Bay and was abandoned. She was scuttled by USS O'Brien (United States Navy). Wreck found in 2017. The whole crew was saved, with only one injured.

== 8 December ==
List of shipwrecks: 8 December 1944
Ship	State	Description
R 56	Kriegsmarine	World War II: The minesweeper was attacked in Bömmelenfjord by Fairey Firefly aircraft of 771 Squadron, Fleet Air Arm, based on HMS Implacable (Royal Navy). She caught fire and capsized.
Shoei Maru	Japan	World War II: The tanker was torpedoed and sunk off the coast of Malaya by USS Hammerhead and USS Paddle (both United States Navy). 42 crewmen were killed.

== 9 December ==
List of shipwrecks: 9 December 1944
Ship	State	Description
Havda	Norway	World War II: The passenger ship (677 GRT, 1881) was torpedoed and sunk in the North Sea off Florø, Norway by Bristol Beaufighter aircraft of 455 Squadron, Royal Air Force with the loss of five lives.
Jun'yō	Imperial Japanese Navy	World War II: The Hiyō-class aircraft carrier was torpedoed and heavily damaged in the Strait of Formosa by USS Plaice, USS Redfish or USS Sea Devil (all United States Navy). 19 crewmen were killed. Withdrawn from service and saw out the war as a guard ship, she was subsequently declared a constructive total loss and scrapped post-war.
U-387	Kriegsmarine	World War II: The Type VIIC submarine was depth charged and sunk in the Barents Sea (69°41′N 33°12′E) by HMS Bamborough Castle (Royal Navy) with the loss of all 51 crew.

== 10 December ==
List of shipwrecks: 10 December 1944
Ship	State	Description
HMS Charlestown	Royal Navy	The Town-class destroyer (1,090/1,390 t, 1919) collided with HMS Florizel (Royal Navy) in the North Sea off Harwich, Essex, United Kingdom and was damaged. She was not repaired.
Dan Beard	United States	World War II: The Liberty ship was torpedoed and sunk in the Irish Sea off Strumble Head, Pembrokeshire, United Kingdom (51°56′N 5°29′W) by U-1202 (Kriegsmarine) with the loss of 29 of her 67 crew.
Gudrun	Germany	World War II: The cargo ship was bombed and sunk off Egersund, Norway by de Havilland Mosquito aircraft of 235 and 248 Squadrons, Royal Air Force.
USS LCT-1075	United States Navy	World War II: The landing craft tank was set on fire at Leyte, Philippines by a kamikaze hitting the Liberty ship Marcus Daly (United States) while she was alongside receiving cargo. The burning wreck was consequently beached. One crew was killed, two missing and ten wounded, one dying of his wounds later.
USS PT-323	United States Navy	World War II: The PT boat was damaged by a kamikaze off Leyte (10°33′N 125°14′E). Two crew were killed and 11 wounded. She was beached and abandoned.
William S. Ladd	United States	World War II: The Liberty ship was sunk in Leyte Harbour by a Japanese kamikaze attack. There was no dead and only 16 wounded.

== 11 December ==
List of shipwrecks: 11 December 1944
Ship	State	Description
CHa-76	Imperial Japanese Navy	World War II: The CHa-1-class auxiliary submarine chaser was sunk in the East China Sea (33°48′N 128°20′E) by USS Sea Owl (United States Navy).
MAS 531	Marina Nazionale Repubblicana	World War II: The MAS 526-class MAS boat was sunk off southern France by Sabre (Free French Naval Forces). There were 5 killed, 6 wounded and 12 prisoners.
HMS MMS 257	Royal Navy	World War II: The MMS-class minesweeper was sunk by a mine off the mouth of the Scheldt. Two of her crew were killed.
Mino Maru	Imperial Japanese Army	World War II: Operation TA-9: The Type 1B Wartime Standard cargo ship/transport was bombed and damaged 30 nautical miles (56 km) off Palompon, Leyte Philippines, by Vought F4U Corsair aircraft of United States Marine Corps squadrons VMF 211, 218, and 313. sinking the next day (11°20′N 124°10′E). One gunner and 43 crewmen were killed.
USS Reid	United States Navy	World War II: The Mahan-class destroyer was sunk in the Philippine Sea off Leyte, Philippines (9°57′40″N 124°56′01″E) by a Japanese kamikaze aircraft attack with the loss of at least 103 crew. One hundred and fifty survivors were rescued.
Tasmania Maru	Imperial Japanese Army	World War II: Operation TA-9: The Shanghai Maru-class transport was bombed and sunk 30 nautical miles (56 km) off Palompon, (11°20′N 124°10′E) by Vought F4U Corsair aircraft of United States Marine Corps squadrons VMF 211, 218, and 313. 1,053 Imperial Japanese Army soldiers, 96 shipboard gunners and 48 crewmen were killed.

== 12 December ==
List of shipwrecks: 12 December 1944
Ship	State	Description
Erica Schünemann	Germany	World War II: The transport ship was sunk in a Soviet air raid on Liepāja, Latvia.
Inca	Germany	World War II: The coastal tanker was sunk in a Soviet air raid on Liepāja.
Lookout	Panama	The cargo ship, one of the seized Danish ships, Anna Maersk, operated under Panamanian flag for the War Shipping Administration, struck a sunken wreck and foundered in the North Sea off Vlissingen, Zeeland, Netherlands.
Minna Cords	Germany	World War II: The coaster was sunk in a Soviet air raid on Liepāja.
T-12	Imperial Japanese Navy	World War II: The No.1-class landing ship was torpedoed and damaged, torpedoed again and sunk just after midnight on 13 December in the Luzon Channel (20°34′N 118°45′E) by USS Pintado (United States Navy)
T-104	Imperial Japanese Navy	World War II: The No. 103-class landing ship was torpedoed and sunk in the Luzon Channel (20°34′N 118°45′E) by USS Pintado (United States Navy).
T-159	Imperial Japanese Navy	World War II: Battle of Ormoc Bay: Convoy TA-9: The No. 103-class landing ship was shelled and sunk in Ormoc Bay, Philippines (11°20′N 124°10′E) by United States Army field artillery, mortars, tank destroyers and by USS Coghlan (United States Navy).
HNoMS Tunsberg Castle	Royal Norwegian Navy	World War II: Convoy RA 62: The Flower-class corvette struck a mine and sank in the Barents Sea (70°43′N 30°07′E) with the loss of five of her 120 crew.
Uzuki	Imperial Japanese Navy	World War II: Battle of Ormoc Bay: Convoy TA-9: The Mutsuki-class destroyer was torpedoed and sunk in Ormoc Bay (11°03′N 124°23′E) by USS PT-490 and USS PT-492 (both United States Navy). Her captain and 170 crewmen were killed; There were 59 survivors.
U-416	Kriegsmarine	World War II: The Type VIIC submarine collided with M 203 (Kriegsmarine) and sank in the Baltic Sea northwest of Pillau, East Prussia (54°58′N 19°33′E) with the loss of 36 of her 41 crew.
V 5101 Blitz	Kriegsmarine	The naval trawler/Vorpostenboot (223 GRT, 1939) was lost on this date.
Wartheland	Germany	World War II: The cargo ship was bombed and sunk off Davik, Norway by de Havilland Mosquito aircraft of 143, 235 and 248 Squadrons, Royal Air Force. Three German soldiers and the Norwegian pilot were killed. She was broken up in place in 1950.
Yūzuki	Imperial Japanese Navy	World War II: Battle of Ormoc Bay: Convoy TA-9: The Mutsuki-class destroyer was bombed and sunk 65 nautical miles (120 km) north-west of Cebu, Philippines (11°20′N 124°10′E) by United States Army and United States Marine Corps aircraft with a loss of 20 crewmen. One hundred and twenty survivors, including her captain, were rescued by Kiri (Imperial Japanese Navy).
Z35	Kriegsmarine	World War II: The destroyer struck a mine and sank after entering a German minefield northeast of Tallinn in the Gulf of Finland. 262 crew were killed, or 70 taken as prisoners of war.
Z36	Kriegsmarine	World War II: The destroyer struck a mine and sank after entering a German minefield northeast of Tallinn in the Gulf of Finland. Sunk with all 278 crew.

== 13 December ==
List of shipwrecks: 13 December 1944
Ship	State	Description
Boltenhof	Germany	World War II: The cargo ship was sunk in an Allied air raid on Swinemünde. She was refloated in 1946, repaired and entered Soviet service as Kuznarenko.
Myōkō	Imperial Japanese Navy	World War II: The Myōkō-class cruiser was torpedoed and severely damaged in the Java Sea by USS Bergall (United States Navy). She was towed in to Singapore where it was found that she was unrepairable. She saw out the war as a floating anti-aircraft battery.
USS Nashville	United States Navy	World War II: The Brooklyn-class cruiser was severely damaged off Negros Island, Philippines by a kamikaze attack. Repairs took until 15 April 1945 to complete.
U-365	Kriegsmarine	World War II: The Type VIIC submarine was depth charged and sunk in the Arctic Ocean east of Jan Mayen, Norway (70°43′N 8°07′E) by Fairey Swordfish aircraft of 813 Squadron, Fleet Air Arm based on HMS Campania (Royal Navy) with the loss of all 50 crew.

== 14 December ==
List of shipwrecks: 14 December 1944
Ship	State	Description
HMS Aldenham	Royal Navy	World War II: The Hunt-class destroyer (1,050/1,490 t, 1942) struck a mine and sank in the Adriatic Sea 45 nautical miles (83 km) south-east of Pola, Italy with the loss of 121 of her 184 crew. Survivors were rescued by HMS Atherstone, HMHDML 1168 and HMML 238 (all Royal Navy).
CD-28	Imperial Japanese Navy	World War II: The Type D escort ship was torpedoed and sunk 100 nautical miles (190 km) north-west of Manila, Philippines (15°50′N 119°45′E) by USS Blenny (United States Navy). One hundred and fifteen crewmen were lost.
Choun Maru No. 7	Imperial Japanese Navy	World War II: The auxiliary minesweeper was torpedoed and sunk in the Indian Ocean by HMS Shalimar (Royal Navy).
Clara L-M Russ	Germany	World War II: The transport was sunk by Soviet aircraft, at Liepāja, Latvia. She was refloated, repaired and returned to service.
Erika Schunemann	Germany	World War II: The transport was sunk by Soviet aircraft at Liepāja, Latvia.
Inka	Germany	World War II: The tanker was sunk by Soviet aircraft at Liepāja, Latvia.
Minna Cords	Germany	World War II: The transport was lost in a collision, or sunk by Soviet aircraft, at Liepāja, Latvia.
North Wind	United States	The 2,448-gross register ton, 298.6-foot (91.0 m) passenger steamer was wrecked in the Shumagin Islands off the Alaska Peninsula near Simeonof Island at 54°52′N 159°10′W.
Oryoku Maru	Imperial Japanese Army	World War II: The Korkuryu Maru-class auxiliary transport was bombed and damaged by aircraft from USS Hornet (United States Navy) and beached off Suesute Point. Patched and refloated at high tide. She was bombed and damaged again the next day by aircraft from USS Hornet. She ran onto rocks on Caimon Reef, capsized and sank 300 yards (270 m) off Olongapo Navy Base (14°45′N 120°13′E). 728 killed, including 442 Japanese civilian evacuees, 286 prisoners of war, 38 gunners and ten crewmen.
Otterburg	Germany	World War II: The transport was sunk by Soviet aircraft, at Liepāja, Latvia.
Perseus	Germany	World War II: The cargo ship struck a mine and sank off Moss, Norway.
Schauenberg	Germany	World War II: The Hansa A Type cargo ship was severely damaged in an Allied air raid on Libau.
T-106	Imperial Japanese Navy	World War II: The landing ship was sunk off Luzon, Philippines by aircraft based on USS Hornet (United States Navy).
Taisho Maru No. 5	Imperial Japanese Navy	World War II: The guard boat was torpedoed and sunk 100 nautical miles (190 km) north-west of Manila (16°27′N 119°43′E) by USS Blenny (United States Navy).

== 15 December ==
List of shipwrecks: 15 December 1944
Ship	State	Description
AF 82	Kriegsmarine	The Artilleriefährprahm, a converted Type C Marinefährprahm, was sunk in a collision off Thybören. There were 2 dead, 3 missing and 45 survivors. SHe was salvaged by the Soviets and put in service as BD-323 (Soviet Navy) in February 1946.
CD-54	Imperial Japanese Navy	World War II: The Type D escort ship was sunk in the Luzon Channel north of Calaya Island (19°25′N 121°25′E) by United States Navy carrier-based aircraft.
Delphin	Germany	World War II: The coaster struck a mine and sank in Hohwacht Bay.
Fort Maisonneuve	United Kingdom	World War II: The Fort ship (7,128 GRT, 1943) struck a mine and sank in the North Sea (51°53′N 3°21′E). Four crew were killed.
USS LST-472	United States Navy	USS LST-472 World War II: The LST-1-class landing ship tank was damaged in the South China Sea off Mindoro, Philippines by a Japanese kamikaze attack. She was scuttled by USS Hall (United States Navy). Three crew were missing and four died of their wounds.
USS LST-738	United States Navy	USS LST-738 and USS Moale. Smoke from USS LST-742 in the left background. World War II: The LST-542-class landing ship tank was damaged in the South China Sea off Mindoro by a Japanese kamikaze attack. USS Moale (United States Navy) rescued 88 survivors before LST-738 was scuttled by USS Hall (United States Navy).
Momo	Imperial Japanese Navy	World War II: The Matsu-class destroyer was torpedoed and sunk 140 nautical miles (260 km) west-south-west of Cape Bolinao, Luzon (16°00′N 117°39′E by USS Hawkbill (United States Navy) with a loss of her captain and 91 crew members, there were 36 wounded.
S 198	Kriegsmarine	World War II: The Type 1939/40 schnellboot was sunk at IJmuiden, North Holland, Netherlands by Avro Lancaster aircraft of 617 Squadron, Royal Air Force using Tallboy bombs. Ten of her crew were killed.
T-106	Imperial Japanese Army	World War II: The No.103-class landing ship was sunk off the west coast of Luzon, south of Lingayen Gulf (15°30′N 119°50′E) by United States Navy carrier-based aircraft.

== 16 December ==
List of shipwrecks: 16 December 1944
Ship	State	Description
Ferndale	Kriegsmarine	World War II: Convoy BE-102-AL: The cargo ship (4,302 GRT, 1925) was bombed and sunk at Krakhellesund, Norway by de Havilland Mosquito aircraft of 143, 235 and 248 Squadrons, Royal Air Force. The crew survived while three German Flak gunners were killed.
Jusan Maru I-Go	Japan	World War II: The transport ship was torpedoed and sunk in the Pacific Ocean off the Bonin Islands by USS Finback (United States Navy).
M 4241 Jacques-Jean	Kriegsmarine	The minesweeper/naval trawler (244 GRT, 1905) was lost on this date.
M 4243 Herzog Albrecht	Kriegsmarine	World War II: The minesweeper, a converted Neuwerk-class naval trawler (470 t, 1918), was scuttled in the mouth of the Loire River.
Parat	Norway	World War II: The salvage tug (135 GRT, 1905) was bombed and sunk at Krakhellesund, Norway by de Havilland Mosquito aircraft of 143, 235 and 248 Squadrons, Royal Air Force. There was no casualties.
Shoei Maru	Imperial Japanese Navy	World War II: The Shoei Maru-class auxiliary transport (1,986 GRT 1936) was torpedoed and sunk in the Indian Ocean about 5.4 nautical miles east of Cape Christina, west of Sunda Strait (05°57′S 104°44′E) by HMS Stoic (Royal Navy). 12 crewmen were killed.
War Diwan	United Kingdom	World War II: The cargo ship struck a mine in the Scheldt and broke in two with the loss of five of her 42 crew. The bow section was refloated on 4 May 1952 and taken in to Vlissingen, Zeeland, Netherlands.

== 17 December ==
List of shipwrecks: 17 December 1944
Ship	State	Description
Shinfuku Maru	Imperial Japanese Navy	World War II: The Shinfuku Maru-class auxiliary transport (a.k.a. Shinhuku Maru and Shinpuku Maru) was bombed and sunk in the South China Sea 30 miles (48 km) west of Manila, Philippines (13°40′N 115°50′E) by US Navy Consolidated PB4Y aircraft of Patrol Bomber Squadron VPB-104.
U-772	Kriegsmarine	World War II: The Type VIIC submarine was depth charged and sunk in the Atlantic Ocean south of Cork, Ireland (51°16′N 8°05′W) by HMS Nyasaland (Royal Navy) with the loss of all 48 crew.

== 18 December ==
List of shipwrecks: 18 December 1944
Ship	State	Description
Belgium Maru	Japan	World War II: The cargo ship was sunk in the South China Sea (14°35′N 120°55′E) by United States Navy carrier-based aircraft.
Finlande	France	The trawler foundered off Peterhead, Scotland.
Gemma	Kriegsmarine	World War II: The net tender was sunk at Gotenhafen, German-occupied Poland by Royal Air Force aircraft.
Heinz Horn	Germany	World War II: The cargo ship was sunk at Gotenhafen by Royal Air Force aircraft. She was later refloated, repaired and returned to service.
USS Hull	United States Navy	Typhoon Cobra: The Farragut-class destroyer foundered in the Philippine Sea (14°57′N 127°58′E) with the loss of 98 of her 160 crew. Forty-one survivors were rescued by USS Tabberer (United States Navy), the rest of the survivors rescued on 20 December.
Leverkusen	Germany	World War II: The cargo ship was bombed and sunk by aircraft at Danzig, Germany, or at Gotenhafen.
USS Monaghan	United States Navy	Typhoon Cobra: The Farragut-class destroyer foundered in the Philippine Sea (14°57′N 127°58′E) with the loss of 94 of her 100 crew. Survivors rescued on 20 December.
USS PT-300	United States Navy	World War II: The PT boat was sunk off Mindoro, Philippines (12°19′N 121°05′E) by a kamikaze attack. Four crew were killed, four missing and six of the seven survivors were wounded.
Schleswig-Holstein	Kriegsmarine	World War II: The training ship, a former Deutschland-class battleship, was bombed and sunk in shallow waters in Gotenhafen by Royal Air Force aircraft. Raised post-war and used as training hulk.
Seelöwe	Kriegsmarine	World War II: The cargo ship (4,922 GRT, 1940) was bombed and sunk at Gotenhafen by Royal Air Force aircraft. Refloated in 1946 and repaired. Entered Polish service in 1949 as Warta.
Silverlaurel	United Kingdom	World War II: Convoy BTC 10: The cargo ship (6,142 GRT, 1939) was torpedoed and sunk in the English Channel south of the Eddystone Lighthouse (50°07′45″N 4°39′05″W) by U-486 (Kriegsmarine). All 65 crew were rescued by Monkstone (United Kingdom).
USS Spence	United States Navy	Typhoon Cobra: The Fletcher-class destroyer foundered in the Philippine Sea (14°57′N 127°58′E) with the loss of 312 of her 336 crew. Fourteen survivors were rescued by USS Tabberer (United States Navy), the rest of the survivors rescued on 20 December.
Steel Traveller	United States	World War II: Convoy ATM 16: The United States Army-chartered cargo ship struck a mine in the Scheldt. She split in two and sank near Buoy NF 16 (51°24′46″N 3°20′21″E). Two crewmen were killed. A passenger, 26 gunners and 45 crewmen were rescued by La Combattante (Free French Naval Forces).
T10	Kriegsmarine	World War II: The Type 35 torpedo boat was bombed and sunk off Gotenhafen by Royal Air Force aircraft.
Theresia L M Russ	Germany	World War II: The cargo ship was sunk by a Royal Air Force air raid on Gotenhafen. She was later repaired and entered British service as Empire Concrete.
Trude Schünemann	Germany	World War II: The cargo ship was sunk at Gotenhafen by Royal Air Force aircraft.
U-1209	Kriegsmarine	World War II: The Type VIIC submarine hit the Wolf Rock between the Isles of Scilly and Cornwall, United Kingdom and was consequently scuttled with the loss of nine of her 44 crew. The survivors were picked up by Royal Navy vessels.
Unitas	Germany	World War II: The factory ship was sunk at Gotenhafen by Royal Air Force aircraft with the loss of 25 lives. She had been refloated by May 1945.
Waldemar Kophamel	Kriegsmarine	World War II: The submarine tender was bombed and sunk by aircraft off the German coast. Raised in 1950 and transferred to the Soviet Union in 1951.
Warthe	Norway	World War II: The cargo ship was bombed and sunk at Gotenhafen, Germany by Allied aircraft. She was refloated in 1945. Subsequently repaired and entered Polish service in May 1949 as Warta.
Zähringen	Kriegsmarine	World War II: The target ship, a former Wittelsbach-class battleship, was bombed and sunk at Gotenhafen by Royal Air Force aircraft.

== 19 December ==
List of shipwrecks: 19 December 1944
Ship	State	Description
Hida Maru	Japan	World War II: The Type 1K ore carrier was bombed and damaged at Hong Kong by four North American P-51 Mustangs of the United States Fourteenth Air Force. She was beached in a sinking condition. The wreck was bombed again on 16 January 1945 by United States Navy carrier-based aircraft. The wreck was totally abandoned on 4 May 1945.
L-25	Soviet Union	The incomplete Leninets-class submarine sank 15 nautical miles (28 km) off Pitsunda whilst being towed from Tuapse to Sevastopol.
Shinfuku Maru	Japan	World War II: The cargo ship, which had been torpedoed and damaged on 6 December by USS Segundo (United States Navy), was sunk west of Manila, Philippines by Consolidated PBY Catalina aircraft of the United States Navy.
U-262	Kriegsmarine	World War II: The Type VIIC submarine was bombed and damaged at Gotenhafen, Pomerania by a Soviet air raid. She was stricken from the navy register in April 1945. The wreck was scrapped in 1947.
U-737	Kriegsmarine	The Type VIIC submarine collided with MRS-25 (Kriegsmarine) in Vestfjorden, Norway and sank with the loss of 31 of her 51 crew.
UJ 1116	Kriegsmarine	World War II: The KUJ-class submarine chaser was sunk by a mine off Feiestein, Norway.
Unryū	Imperial Japanese Navy	World War II: The aircraft carrier was torpedoed and sunk in the East China Sea (29°59′N 124°03′E) by USS Redfish (United States Navy) with the loss of 1,239 of her 1,386 crew. Survivors, an officer and 146 crewmen, were rescued by Shigure (Imperial Japanese Navy).

== 20 December ==
List of shipwrecks: 20 December 1944
Ship	State	Description
Bryteren	Norway	The cargo ship (56 GRT, 1914) collided with Bretagne (Norway) at Oslo, Norway, and sank with the loss of one crew member. Raised in 1945, repaired and returned to service.
Hiyoshi Maru No. 2 GO	Imperial Japanese Navy	World War II: Convoy No. 3217: The transport was damaged by a mine off Chichijima, Japan, and was beached. She was refloated on 6 January 1945.
Hokuryu Maru	Japan	The cargo ship ran aground and sank about 250 metres (820 ft) off the south east coast of Teuri Island (44°25′N 141°18′E) in the Sea of Japan in a blinding blizzard with the loss of two crew.
USS LST-359	United States Navy	World War II: The landing ship tank was torpedoed and sunk in the Atlantic Ocean north-east of the Azores, Portugal (42°04′N 19°08′W) by U-870 (Kriegsmarine) with the loss of two of her 107 crew. Survivors were rescued by Moose Peak (United States).
Mamiya	Imperial Japanese Navy	World War II: The supply ship was torpedoed and damaged in the South China Sea (17°48′N 114°09′E) by USS Sealion (United States Navy). She was torpedoed again by USS Sealion and sunk on 21 December.
SF 312	Kriegsmarine	World War II: The Siebelfahre Type 43 was sunk in the port of Memel by Soviet bombers. She was later raised and repaired.
Shoeki Maru	Japan	World War II: The cargo ship was sunk south of the Celebes Islands by North American B-25 Mitchell aircraft of the Royal Netherlands Air Force.
Tanga	Germany	World War II: The cargo ship was severely damaged in an Allied air raid on Liepāja, Latvia. She was seized as a prize in April 1945. Offered to Sweden, but repaired in 1947 for German owners.

== 21 December ==
List of shipwrecks: 21 December 1944
Ship	State	Description
Hitonose	Imperial Japanese Navy	The repair ship sank after colliding with the merchant ship Kosho (Japan). She was raised, repaired and returned to service.
Leith N.B.	United Kingdom	The 115.5-foot (35.2 m), 203-ton trawler sank after being holed by one of her trawl doors 27 miles (43 km) northwest of Noup Head, Westray, Orkney Islands. The crew were rescued from her boat by the trawler Ben Glas (United Kingdom).
USS LST-460	United States Navy	World War II: The landing ship tank was damaged in the Sulu Sea by a Japanese kamikaze aircraft attack and was abandoned.
USS LST-749	United States Navy	World War II: The LST-542-class landing ship tank was sunk in the Sulu Sea by a Japanese kamikaze aircraft attack with the loss of many lives. Survivors were rescued by USS Converse (United States Navy).
Michael J. Goulandris	Greece	The cargo ship was wrecked on the South West Reefs, 3 1/2 nautical miles (6.5 km) south of Point D'Entrecasteaux, Western Australia.
Reshitl'nyj	Soviet Union	World War II: The gunboat was rammed and sunk in the Barents Sea off Mys Korabel'naya Pakhta by U-995 (Kriegsmarine) with the loss of 28 of the 31 people on board. Survivors were rescued by MO-251 (Soviet Navy).
Samtucky	United Kingdom	World War II: Convoy HX 327: The cargo ship (7,219 GRT, 1943) was torpedoed and damaged in the Atlantic Ocean (44°22′N 63°23′W) by U-806 (Kriegsmarine). She was beached off Halifax, Nova Scotia, Canada. Later repaired and returned to service.
Trostburg	Germany	World War II: The cargo ship was bombed and sunk by aircraft at Hamburg, Germany. Wreck scrapped in the Soviet Union from August 1950. Also reported as being refloated in 1947, repaired and returned to Soviet service in 1950 as Magnitogorsk.
UJ 1113 and UJ 1702	Kriegsmarine	World War II: The KUJ-class naval trawler/submarine chasers struck mines and sank off the Feistein Lighthouse, Norway.
UJ 1116	Kriegsmarine	The KUJ-class naval trawler/submarine chaser was lost on this date.
Weichselland	Germany	World War II: The cargo ship struck a mine and sank near Stavanger, Norway (58°50′N 5°29′E).

== 22 December ==
List of shipwrecks: 22 December 1944
Ship	State	Description
Arita Maru	Japan	World War II: Convoy HI-82: The Type 2TL standard tanker was torpedoed and sunk in the South China Sea 25 nautical miles (46 km) east of Quảng Ngãi, French Indochina (15°07′N 109°05′E) by USS Flasher (United States Navy). Fifty-seven crewmen were killed.
Chidori	Imperial Japanese Navy	World War II: The Chidori-class torpedo boat was torpedoed and sunk in the Pacific Ocean (34°30′N 138°02′E) 90 nautical miles (170 km) west-south-west of Yokosuka by USS Tilefish (United States Navy).
Eberhard	Luftwaffe	World War II: The cargo ship struck a mine and sank off Rixhöft, Pomerania.
Kenzui Maru	Japan	World War II: Convoy TAMA-36: The cargo ship was torpedoed and sunk 9 nautical miles (17 km) north of North San Fernando, Luzon, Philippines by USS Blenny (United States Navy). One thousand, seven hundred and forty-two troops were killed.
USS LST-563	United States Navy	USS LST-563 aground on Clipperton Island. The landing ship tank was wrecked on Clipperton Island (10°18′N 109°13′W). Several attempts made at salvaging her but efforts were abandoned in February 1945.
Omurosan Maru	Imperial Japanese Navy	World War II: Convoy HI-82: The Otowasan Maru-class auxiliary tanker was torpedoed and sunk in the South China Sea 25 miles (40 km) east of Quang Ngai, French Indochina (15°07′N 109°05′E) by USS Flasher (United States Navy). Two crewmen were killed.
Otowasan Maru	Imperial Japanese Navy	World War II: Convoy HI-82: The Otowasan Maru-class auxiliary tanker was torpedoed and sunk in the South China Sea 25 nautical miles (46 km) east of Quảng Ngãi, (15°07′N 109°05′E) by USS Flasher (United States Navy). Fifty-six troops, a passenger, her captain and 62 crewmen were killed.
R-402	Kriegsmarine	World War II: The Type R-401 minesweeper was sunk by a mine off Feiestein, Norway.
Reporter	Germany	World War II: The customs vessel was sunk in the Baltic Sea by Soviet Petlyakov Pe-2 aircraft.
SW.31	Germany	World War II: The police vessel was sunk in the Baltic Sea by Soviet Petlyakov Pe-2 aircraft.
UJ 1211 Narvik	Kriegsmarine):	The Seeteufel-class naval whaler/submarine chaser was wrecked at Ulvenfeuer.
Vs 60 Fredericus Rex	Kriegsmarine	World War II: The Vorpostenboot struck a mine and sank in the Baltic Sea north of Usedom, Pomerania.
Vs 134	Kriegsmarine	The KFK 2-class naval drifter/Vorpostenboot was sunk in a collision.
Yaei Maru No. 6	Japan	World War II: The tanker was torpedoed and sunk in the Strait of Malacca by HMS Terrapin and HMS Trenchant (both Royal Navy).

== 23 December ==
List of shipwrecks: 23 December 1944
Ship	State	Description
Dumfries	United Kingdom	World War II: Convoy MKS 71: The cargo ship (5,149 GRT, 1935) was torpedoed and sunk in the English Channel south-east of St. Catherine's Point, Isle of Wight (50°22′48″N 1°42′36″W) by U-322 or U-772 (both Kriegsmarine). All 59 crew were rescued by HMS Balsam and HMS Pearl (both Royal Navy).
M-489	Kriegsmarine	World War II: The Type 1940 minesweeper was torpedoed and sunk in Bømlafjorden, Norway by HNoMS MTB 712 (Royal Norwegian Navy). Of the 75 crew on board, 46 were killed.
S 185	Kriegsmarine	World War II: The Type 1939/40 schnellboote was shelled and sunk in a battle against HMS Curzon, HMS Kittiwake and HMS Torrington (all Royal Navy). Six crew were killed and 22 captured.
S-192	Kriegsmarine	World War II: The Type 1939/40 schnellboote was shelled and sunk in a battle against HMS Curzon, HMS Kittiwake and HMS Torrington (all Royal Navy). There were no survivor.
Slemish	United Kingdom	World War II: Convoy WEG 71: The coaster was torpedoed and sunk in the English Channel by U-772 (Kriegsmarine).
Assault demolition motorboats	Imperial Japanese Army	World War II: Fifty Maru-ni Type explosive motor boats were destroyed in their base in a cave on Corregidor, Philippines, when an engine compartment fire detonated the explosives on board one boat as the boats are preparing to sortie. One hundred crewmen were killed.

== 24 December ==
List of shipwrecks: 24 December 1944
Ship	State	Description
Alan-A-Dale	Panama	World War II: The cargo ship was sunk at Antwerp, Belgium by a German Biber midget submarine. All 65 crew survived. She was on a voyage from New York, United States to Antwerp.
BMO-594	Soviet Navy	World War II: The MO-class small guard ship was torpedoed and sunk in the Baltic Sea off Cape Pakri by U-637 (Kriegsmarine).
CH-30	Imperial Japanese Navy	World War II: The CH-28-class submarine chaser was torpedoed and sunk in the South China Sea off Kuching (02°42′N 111°05′E) by USS Barbero (United States Navy).
HMCS Clayoquot	Royal Canadian Navy	World War II: Convoy XB 139: The Bangor-class minesweeper (672/875 t, 1941) was torpedoed and sunk in the Atlantic Ocean 3 nautical miles (5.6 km) off the Sambro Lightship (Canada) (44°25′N 63°20′W) by U-806 (Kriegsmarine) with the loss of eight of her 81 crew.
Empire Path	United Kingdom	World War II: The cargo ship (6,140 GRT, 1943) struck a mine and was damaged in the English Channel off Dunkirk, Nord, France (51°22′N 2°25′E). She was beached but her back was broken. Declared a total loss.
Junpo Maru	Japan	World War II: The cargo ship was torpedoed and sunk in the South China Sea off Makassar, Netherlands East Indies (01°10′N 108°20′E) by USS Barbero (United States Navy).
Leopoldville	Belgium	World War II: Convoy WEP 3: The troopship was torpedoed and sunk in the English Channel 5 nautical miles (9.3 km) off Cherbourg, Seine-Inférieure, France (49°45′N 1°34′W) by U-486 (Kriegsmarine) with the loss of 819 of the 2,374 people on board. Survivors were rescued by HMS Brilliant (Royal Navy) and USS PC-1225 (United States Navy).
Robert J. Walker	United States	World War II: The Liberty ship was torpedoed and damaged in the Pacific Ocean off the south coast of New South Wales, Australia (36°32′S 150°45′E) by U-862 (Kriegsmarine) with the loss of two of the 69 people on board. Survivors – a passenger, 26 gunners, and 40 crewmen, were rescued by HMAS Quickmatch (Royal Australian Navy). She sank the next day.
T-8	Imperial Japanese Navy	World War II: The No.1-class landing ship was sunk off Chichi Jima (25°10′N 141°00′E) by USS Case and USS Roe (both United States Navy).
T-157	Imperial Japanese Navy	World War II: The No. 103-class landing ship was shelled and set on fire off Iwo Jima (24°47′N 141°20′E) by USS Case and USS Roe (both United States Navy). She was beached in shallow water, but burned out.

== 25 December ==
List of shipwrecks: 25 December 1944
Ship	State	Description
HMS Dakins	Royal Navy	World War II: The Captain-class frigate (1,432/1,823 t, 1943) was severely damaged by a mine in the North Sea off Ostend, West Flanders, Belgium. Declared a total constructive loss.
Manila Maru	Japan	World War II: The tanker was torpedoed and sunk in the South China Sea by USS Mingo (United States Navy).
Reisui Maru	Imperial Japanese Navy	World War II: The auxiliary minesweeper was torpedoed and sunk in the Strait of Makassar by HMS Terrapin and HMS Trenchant (both Royal Navy).
Tango Maru	Japan	World War II: The cargo ship was torpedoed and sunk in the Bali Sea (7°46′S 115°09′E) by USS Rasher (United States Navy).
T-113	Imperial Japanese Navy	World War II: The No. 103-class landing ship was sunk at Masinloc, Luzon, Philippines (15°30′N 119°55′E) by US carrier aircraft from Task Force 38.

== 26 December ==
List of shipwrecks: 26 December 1944
Ship	State	Description
HMS Affleck	Royal Navy	World War II: The Captain-class frigate (1,432/1,823 t, 1943) was torpedoed and damaged in the English Channel 10 nautical miles (19 km) off Cherbourg, Manche, France by U-486 (Kriegsmarine). Seven crew were killed. She was towed to Cherbourg but was declared a constructive total loss.
Benjamin Ide Wheeler	United States	World War II: The Liberty ship sank after a kamikaze attack in Leyte Gulf with the loss of two crew. The wreck was refloated and used as a stationary depot ship. The vessel was scrapped in 1948.
Biwi	Germany	World War II: The coaster (790 GRT, 1940) was torpedoed and sunk off Olskjær, Norway by HNoMS MTB 627 and HNoMS MTB 717 (both Royal Norwegian Navy). Raised post-war, repaired and entered Swedish service as Servus.
HMS Capel	Royal Navy	World War II: The Captain-class frigate (1,192/1,436 t, 1943) was torpedoed and sunk in the English Channel 10 nautical miles (19 km) north-east of Cherbourg (49°50′N 1°41′W) by U-486 (Kriegsmarine) with the loss of 76 of her 156 crew.
James H. Breasted	United States	World War II: The Liberty ship was damaged in the Philippine Sea at Mindoro, Philippines by Japanese ships and then bombed, probably by an American aircraft. She was later written off as a total loss. All 33 crewmen and 27 Armed Guards survived.
Kiyoshimo	Imperial Japanese Navy	World War II: The Yūgumo-class destroyer was bombed and damaged by United States Army aircraft off Mindoro, Philippines. She was then torpedoed and sunk 145 nautical miles (269 km) south of Manila (12°20′N 121°00′E) by USS PT-223 (United States Navy). Eighty-two crewmen were killed, 74 were wounded. One hundred and sixty-nine survivors, including her captain, were rescued by Asashimo (Imperial Japanese Navy) and five by United States Navy PT boats.
RT-52 Som	Soviet Union	World War II: The fishing vessel was torpedoed and sunk in the Barents Sea off Cape Svyatoy Nos by U-995 (Kriegsmarine) with the loss of 31 of her 32 crew. The survivor was taken on board U-995 as a prisoner of war.
U-2342	Kriegsmarine	World War II: The Type XXIII submarine struck a mine and sank in the Baltic Sea north of Swinemünde, Pomerania (54°01′08″N 14°15′20″E) with the loss of seven crew. The wreck was dispersed in 1954.

== 27 December ==
List of shipwrecks: 27 December 1944
Ship	State	Description
Baltenland	Germany	World War II: The cargo ship was torpedoed and sunk in the Baltic Sea (55°13′N 16°57′E) by K-56 (Soviet Navy).
Daicho Maru	Imperial Japanese Navy	The Daicho Maru-class auxiliary transport ship blew up and sank while loading ammunition at Djakarta, Java's port, Tanjung Priok (06°15′S 106°45′E).
HR 1 Varouni	Kriegsmarine	The armed yacht was lost on this date.
Jamaica Planter	United Kingdom	World War II: Convoy HX 326: The cargo ship (4,098 GRT, 1936) collided with the tanker Wellesley (United States) and sank in the Atlantic Ocean (51°21′45″N 3°14′22″W). All crew survived.
T-7	Imperial Japanese Navy	World War II: The No.1-class landing ship was shelled and sunk off Iwo Jima (24°47′N 141°20′E) by USS Fanning, USS Cummings, and USS Dunlap (all United States Navy).
T-132	Imperial Japanese Navy	World War II: The No. 103-class landing ship was torpedoed and sunk at Iwo Jima (24°47′N 141°20′E) by USS Fanning, USS Cummings, and USS Dunlap (all United States Navy).
U-877	Kriegsmarine	World War II: The Type IXC/40 submarine was depth charged and sunk in the Atlantic Ocean north-west of the Azores, Portugal (46°25′N 36°38′W) by HMCS St. Thomas (Royal Canadian Navy) using Squid. All 56 crew were rescued by HMCS St. Thomas.

== 28 December ==
List of shipwrecks: 28 December 1944
Ship	State	Description
Empire Javelin	United Kingdom	World War II: Convoy TBC 1: The Landing Ship, Infantry (Large) was sunk in the English Channel north-east of Cherbourg, Manche, France (50°5′N 1°0′W), either by a mine, or by U-772 (Kriegsmarine). Survivors were rescued by L'Escarmouche (Free French Naval Forces).
Holmengraa	Kriegsmarine	World War II: The naval tanker was bombed and sunk by Royal Air Force aircraft off Horten, Norway with the loss of 13 lives.
John Burke	United States	World War II: The Liberty ship was sunk in the Philippine Sea off Mindoro by a Japanese kamikaze attack. The ship exploded and sank killing all 28 gunners and 40 crewmen.
La France	Kriegsmarine	World War II: The auxiliary minelayer (616 GRT, 1909) was bombed and sunk at Skudeneshavn, Norway by de Havilland Mosquito aircraft of 143, 235 and 248 Squadrons, Royal Air Force. Refloated in 1946, repaired and returned to Norwegian commercial service.
USS LST-750	United States Navy	World War II: The LST-542-class landing ship tank was damaged in the Sulu Sea off Los Negros (09°01′N 122°30′E) by a Japanese kamikaze attack. She was scuttled by USS Edwards (United States Navy).
Nozaki	Imperial Japanese Navy	World War II: The Nozaki-class supply ship was torpedoed and sunk in the South China Sea 50 nautical miles (93 km; 58 mi) northeast of Nha Trang, French Indochina by USS Dace (United States Navy). Twenty-five survivors were rescued on 29 December off Cam Rahn Bay by Kaya, Kashi, and Sugi (all Imperial Japanese Navy).
U-735	Kriegsmarine	World War II: The Type VIIC submarine was bombed and sunk by Royal Air Force aircraft off Horten, Norway with the loss of 39 of the 40 crew on board at the time.
Unknown motor boat	Kriegsmarine	World War II: The motor boat was shelled by PC-24 Marjan ( Yugoslav Partisans) and exploded in Sv. Petar harbor.

== 29 December ==
List of shipwrecks: 29 December 1944
Ship	State	Description
Arthur Sewall	United States	World War II: Convoy TBC 21: The Liberty ship was torpedoed and damaged in the English Channel 7 nautical miles (13 km) south-east of Portland Bill, Dorset (50°28′N 2°28′W) by U-322 or U-772 (both Kriegsmarine) with the loss of two of her 69 crew. She was towed to Weymouth by HMS Pilot (Royal Navy) but was declared a total loss.
Black Hawk	United States	World War II: Convoy TBC 21: The Liberty ship was torpedoed and damaged in the English Channel by U-322or German submarine U-772 (2) (both Kriegsmarine) with the loss of one of her 69 crew. Survivors were rescued by HMS Dahlia (Royal Navy). She broke in two, with the stern section sinking. The bow section was beached and later scrapped.
HMMTB 782	Royal Navy	World War II: The motor torpedo boat (90/107 t, 1944) was sunk by a mine off the Scheldt with the loss of three of her crew.
Nordvard	Kriegsmarine	World War II: The U-boat support ship (4,111 GRT, 1925) was bombed and sunk off Moss, Norway by de Havilland Mosquito aircraft of 143, 235 and 248 Squadrons, Royal Air Force. One hundred and sixteen crew were killed.
T-883 Dvina	Soviet Navy	World War II: Convoy KB 37: The minesweeper was torpedoed and sunk in the Barents Sea south-east of Cape Svyatoj Nos by U-995 (Kriegsmarine) with the loss of all 49 crew.
Thann	Germany	World War II: The tanker struck a mine and sank in the Baltic Sea off Darß, Mecklenburg-Western Pomerania.
U-322	Kriegsmarine	World War II: The Type VIIC/41 submarine was depth charged and sunk in the English Channel south of Weymouth, Dorset, United Kingdom (50°25′N 2°26′W) by HMCS Calgary (Royal Canadian Navy) with the loss of all 52 crew.
Venersborg	Sweden	World War II: The cargo ship either struck a mine and sank 20 nautical miles (37 km) off the Utklippan Lighthouse with the loss of nineteen of her twenty crew, or was torpedoed and sunk by K51 (Soviet Navy).
Vestkap	Norway	The coaster was driven ashore in a storm at Stokmarknes, Norway and was a total loss.
Walter Korte	Germany	World War II: The buoy tender sank in the Baltic Sea off Swinemünde, Pomerania. Probable cause of loss was striking a mine.
130	Japan	World War II: The lighter was sunk in Philippines waters by USS Hawkbill (United States Navy).

== 30 December ==
List of shipwrecks: 30 December 1944
Ship	State	Description
Aobasan Maru	Imperial Japanese Army	World War II: Convoy MATA-38: The Aosan Maru-class auxiliary anti-aircraft transport was bombed and sunk at San Fernando, Luzon, Philippines (17°18′N 119°25′E) by Consolidated B-24 Liberator aircraft of the United States Fifth Air Force. Twenty-five soldiers, a gunner and three crew members were killed.
CD-20	Imperial Japanese Navy	World War II: Convoy MATA-38: The Type D escort ship was bombed and sunk at the mouth of Lingayen Gulf, Luzon (06°30′N 120°18′E) by Douglas A-20 Havoc, North American B-25 Mitchell and Curtiss P-40 Warhawk aircraft of the United States Fifth Air Force. Fifty-two crew members were lost.
CH-18	Imperial Japanese Navy	World War II: Convoy MATA-38: The CH-13-class submarine chaser was bombed and sunk at the mouth of Lingayen Gulf (06°30′N 120°18′E) by Douglas A-20 Havoc, North American B-25 Mitchell and Curtiss P-40 Warhawk aircraft of the United States Fifth Air Force.
Hobart Baker	United States	World War II: The Liberty ship was bombed and sunk in the Philippine Sea off Mindoro, Philippines by Japanese aircraft. One crew was killed, another and two gunners were wounded.
Juan de Fuca	United States	World War II: The Liberty ship was torpedoed and damaged by a Japanese aircraft, without casualties, in the Philippine Sea 20 nautical miles (37 km; 23 mi) off Mindoro, Philippines. She was beached on Ambulong Island. She was later refloated and towed to Subic Bay. Repaired and entered United States Navy service as USS Araner.
Kuretake	Imperial Japanese Navy	World War II: Convoy MATA-38: The Wakatake-class destroyer was torpedoed and sunk in the South China Sea 60 nautical miles (110 km) southeast of Formosa (21°00′N 121°24′E) by USS Razorback (United States Navy).
Muroran Maru	Japan	World War II: Convoy MATA-38: The Sumedono Maru-class transport was bombed, exploded and sank off Santiago Island, Luzon north of Lingayen Gulf (17°17′N 120°24′E) by Douglas A-20 Havoc, North American B-25 Mitchell and Curtiss P-40 Warhawk aircraft of the United States Fifth Air Force. All 94 passengers and all 71 crewmen were killed. There were only three survivors.
USS Orestes	United States Navy	World War II: The Varuna-class motor torpedo boat tender was damaged in the Pacific Ocean by an Aichi D3A "Val" aircraft of the Imperial Japanese Navy which crashed into her amidships killing 45 of her 341 crew. She was beached and later towed to Leyte, Philippines by USS LST-708 (United States Navy). Subsequently repaired and returned to service.
USS Porcupine	United States Navy	USS Porcupine World War II: The Armadillo-class tanker was damaged in Mangarin Bay (12°21′N 121°02′E) by a Japanese Aichi D3A "Val" aircraft in a kamikaze attack. Seven sailors died and eight were wounded. She was scuttled by USS Gansevoort (United States Navy).
Tbilisi	Soviet Union	World War II: Convoy KP 24: The Liberty ship was torpedoed and damaged in the Barents Sea (69°56′N 32°29′E) by U-956 (Kriegsmarine) with the loss of 47 of the 139 people on board. Survivors were rescued by BO-150 and T-115 (both Soviet Navy). Tbilisi was taken in tow by the tugs M-2 and M-12 (both Soviet Navy), eventually arriving at Murmansk. Although she was declared a total loss, she was repaired and returned to service in 1959 when the bow section from Horace Gray (United States) was fitted at Arkhangelsk.
Teikai Maru	Japan	World War II: Convoy MATA-38: The government owned transport was bombed and damaged north of Lingayen Gulf, Luzon (17°17′N 120°24′E) by Douglas A-20 Havoc, North American B-25 Mitchell and Curtiss P-40 Warhawk aircraft of the United States Fifth Air Force. The burning wreck drifted aground on the coast. Twenty-two passengers, fifteen gunners and 23 crew members were lost.
U-772	Kriegsmarine	World War II: The Type VIIC submarine was bombed and sunk by a Vickers Wellington aircraft of 407 Squadron, Royal Canadian Air Force.

== 31 December ==
List of shipwrecks: 31 December 1944
Ship	State	Description
Achilles	Germany	World War II: The cargo ship was sunk off Flekkefjord, Norway by de Havilland Mosquito aircraft of 143, 235 and 248 Squadrons, Royal Air Force.
Faro	Germany	World War II: The cargo ship was bombed and sunk at Hamburg in an American air raid.
M-445	Kriegsmarine	World War II: The minesweeper was bombed and sunk at Hamburg in an American air raid.
Mannheim	Germany	World War II: The cargo ship was bombed and sunk at Hamburg in an American air raid.
Palermo	Germany	World War II: The cargo ship was sunk in Flekkefjord by de Havilland Mosquito aircraft of 143, 235 and 248 Squadrons, Royal Air Force. She was refloated in 1946, repaired, and entered Norwegian service in 1947 as Nina.
Rival	Germany	World War II: The cargo ship was bombed and sunk at Hamburg in an American air raid.
Sperrbrecher 137 Prins Willem IV	Germany	World War II: The sperrbrecher was severely damaged in an Allied air raid on Hamburg whilst under conversion. The conversion was consequently abandoned. She was repaired in 1945 and entered Dutch service as Prins Willem IV.
U-906	Kriegsmarine	World War II: The unfinished Type VIIC submarine was bombed and sunk at Hamburg in an American air raid.
U-2530	Kriegsmarine	World War II: The Type XXI submarine was bombed and sunk at Hamburg in an American air raid. Refloated in January 1945.
Unryu Maru	Japan	World War II: The cargo ship was torpedoed and sunk in the Indian Ocean near Port Blair, Andaman Islands by HMS Shakespeare (Royal Navy). One hundred and forty-nine passengers and crew were killed; two watchmen survived.

== Unknown date ==
List of shipwrecks: Unknown date 1944
Ship	State	Description
HA-83	Imperial Japanese Navy	The Type C midget submarine was lost in late December when she ran aground off Cebu, Philippines.
HMS LCA 1188	Royal Navy	The landing craft assault was lost sometime in December.
MAS 430	Kriegsmarine	World War II: The MAS 423-class MAS boat was scuttled at Šibenik, Yugoslavia.
Pionier	Kriegsmarine	The Pionier-class river monitor was lost sometime in December. Salvaged post war and put in service as ORP Okon (Polish Navy).
River Ythan	United Kingdom	The 112.2-foot (34.2 m), 161-ton trawler vanished after leaving Grimsby on 15 December. Lost with all 12 hands.
SS-10 and SS-14	Imperial Japanese Army	World War II: Convoy TA-7, 2nd group: The SS craft No. 3-class landing ships, comprising an unescorted convoy, went missing on the night of 1–2 December, and lost with all hands after departing Palompon, Leyte, Philippines. USS Conway, USS Cony, USS Eaton, and USS Sigourney (all United States Navy) did report sinking an enemy vessel in the area the convoy would have been in.
U-196	Kriegsmarine	World War II: The Type IXD2 submarine went missing on or after 1 December whilst on patrol in the Sunda Strait with the loss of all 65 crew. Cause unknown.
U-400	Kriegsmarine	World War II: The Type VIIC submarine struck a mine and sank in the Atlantic Ocean off the coast of Cornwall, United Kingdom (50°33′16″N 5°11′37″W) in mid-December with the loss of all 50 crew.
USS YCF-42	United States Navy	The non-self-propelled car float was lost sometime in December.
