= USS Wintle =

Two ships of the United States Navy have been named Wintle.

- USS Wintle (DE-25) was an Evarts-class destroyer escort built at Mare Island Navy Yard and launched in 1943 as BDE-25. She was intended for transfer to the Royal Navy but was reallocated to the US Navy, taking the name Wintle from DE-266, which went to the UK in her place. She served in the Pacific in World War II and was decommissioned in November 1945.
- USS Wintle (DE-266) was an Evarts-class destroyer escort laid down at Boston. She was allocated to the Royal Navy in place of DE-25 (above) and was commissioned as HMS Capel in August 1943. She was torpedoed by U-486 on 26 December 1944.
