= SS Empire Javelin =

World War II merchant ship of the United Kingdom

History

United Kingdom
- Name: Cape Lobos (laid down); Empire Javelin (completed)
- Owner: MoWT
- Operator: Blue Star Line
- Port of registry: (United Kingdom) London
- Builder: Consolidated Steel Corporation, Wilmington, CA
- Launched: 25 October 1943
- Completed: January 1944
- Identification: UK official number 169774; Call sign MYMQ
- Fate: Sunk on 28 December 1944

General characteristics
- Class & type: C1-S-AY1, Landing Ship Infantry
- Tonnage: 7,177 GRT; tonnage under deck 6,087; 4,823 NRT
- Displacement: 11,650 long tons
- Length: 396.5 ft (120.9 m)
- Beam: 60.1 ft (18.3 m)
- Depth: 35.0 ft (10.7 m)
- Propulsion: 2 × steam turbines, single screw
- Sensors & processing systems: wireless direction finding
- Armament: 1 × 4 inch gun; 1 × 12 pdr gun; 12 × Oerlikon 20 mm cannon

SS Empire Javelin was an Infantry Landing Ship designated an "LSI (Large)" in service with the UK in the latter part of World War II. Launched on 25 October 1943, she was a United States Maritime Commission C1-S-AY1 subtype, one of thirteen similar ships built by Consolidated Steel Corporation.

SS Empire Javelin served as a troop ship in Operation Overlord, starting with the initial landings on the beaches on 6 June 1944 ("D-Day"). She was lost on 28 December 1944 while in convoy to France with 1,483 troops aboard somewhere around the midpoint between Southampton, southern England, and Le Havre, France. She may have been torpedoed by German submarine U-322, active in the area on the same day, or struck a mine.

== History ==
Empire Javelin was built by Consolidated Steel Corporation, Wilmington, California as the Cape Lobos, and transferred under the terms of lend lease on completion in January 1944. She was bareboat chartered by the War Shipping Administration to the Ministry of War Transport and managed by Blue Star Line.

=== Action on D Day ===
Empire Javelin arrived in Portsmouth late in the summer of 1943 where she took delivery of 18 British designed Thornycroft Landing Craft Assault (LCA's). Sailing north, the Merchant Navy and Royal Navy crews spent many weeks in training off Holy Loch in Scotland, practicing raising and lowering her LCA's and firing her protective anti-aircraft guns in preparation for D-Day.

The ship sailed from Portland Harbour anchorage on 5 June 1944, destined for Dog Green Omaha Beach, Normandy, after embarking troops of the 1st Battalion 116th Infantry regiment of US 29th Division by landing craft from Weymouth, Dorset. Members of Company A, 116th Infantry, were from Bedford, Virginia. where the United States' National D-Day Memorial is located.

The 551st Landing Craft Assault (LCA) Flotilla, crewed by Royal Navy Volunteer Reserve (RNVR) of Combined Operations, was based aboard Empire Javelin on D-Day. Six of the eighteen LCAs of the flotilla were lost on 6 June and the remainder were severely damaged.

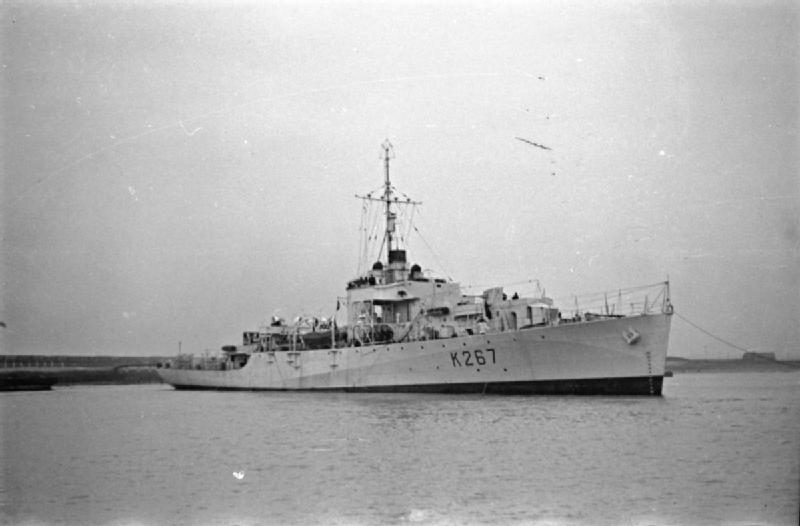
L'Escarmouche, a Free French frigate that rescued the survivors of Empire Javelin

=== Loss, 28 December 1944 ===
Empire Javelin embarked 1,483 US servicemen at Southampton for Le Havre, France on 28 December 1944. She was in convoy with USS LST-325 and escorted by the Free French frigate L'Escarmouche. In the English Channel on the afternoon of the 28th there was an explosion without warning at 50°5′N 1°0′W; at least 20 people died and 20 more injured. The L'Escarmouche was called alongside once the extent of the damage had been assessed, and for approximately an hour the men on board the Empire Javelin jumped from the ship. HMS Hargood arrived to assist, standing off nearby on submarine watch. Two minutes after the last man jumped off, there was a large explosion and the ship began settling by the stern. About 10 minutes later she was completely submerged.

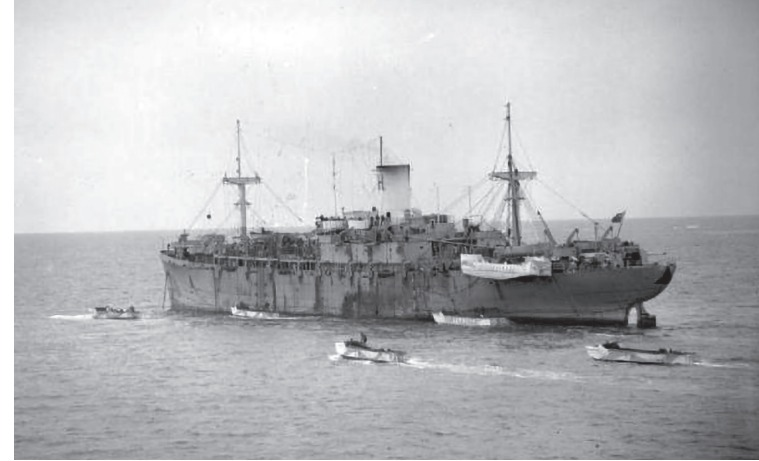
Empire Javelin on sea trials in Holy Loch, 1943

In 2024, Pen & Sword Books published a new book by author Philip Kay-Bujak titled Empire Javelin: D-Day Assault Ship. In this book, Kay-Bujak deals with the mystery over her sinking. Initially it was thought that the ship had been torpedoed by German submarine U-772, but it was later revealed that U-772 was sunk earlier that month. Another U-boat, U-322, was active in the area on the same day, and was sunk on the next day south of Weymouth. There is no definitive proof of what sank the Empire Javelin although Kay-Bujak establishes that she was probably sunk by a mine.
