= German submarine U-637 =

German world war II submarine

History

Nazi Germany
- Name: U-637
- Ordered: 20 January 1941
- Builder: Blohm & Voss, Hamburg
- Yard number: 613
- Laid down: 17 October 1941
- Launched: 7 July 1942
- Commissioned: 27 August 1942
- Fate: Surrendered on 9 May 1945 at Stavanger. Later sunk as part of Operation Deadlight on 21 December 1945.

General characteristics
- Class & type: Type VIIC submarine
- Displacement: 769 tonnes (757 long tons) surfaced; 871 t (857 long tons) submerged
- Length: 67.10 m (220 ft 2 in) o/a; 50.50 m (165 ft 8 in) pressure hull
- Beam: 6.20 m (20 ft 4 in) o/a; 4.70 m (15 ft 5 in) pressure hull
- Draught: 4.74 m (15 ft 7 in)
- Installed power: 2,800–3,200 PS (2,100–2,400 kW; 2,800–3,200 bhp) (diesels); 750 PS (550 kW; 740 shp) (electric)
- Propulsion: 2 shafts; 2 × diesel engines; 2 × electric motors
- Speed: 17.7 knots (32.8 km/h; 20.4 mph) surfaced; 7.6 knots (14.1 km/h; 8.7 mph) submerged
- Range: 8,500 nmi (15,700 km; 9,800 mi) at 10 knots (19 km/h; 12 mph) surfaced; 80 nmi (150 km; 92 mi) at 4 knots (7.4 km/h; 4.6 mph) submerged
- Test depth: 230 m (750 ft); Crush depth: 250–295 m (820–968 ft)
- Complement: 4 officers, 40–56 enlisted
- Armament: 5 × 53.3 cm (21 in) torpedo tubes (4 bow, 1 stern); 14 × torpedoes or 26 TMA mines; 1 × 8.8 cm (3.46 in) deck gun (220 rounds); 1 × twin 2 cm (0.79 in) C/30 anti-aircraft gun

Service record
- Part of: 5th U-boat Flotilla; 27 August 1942 – 31 May 1944; 1st U-boat Flotilla; 1 June – 5 July 1944; 8th U-boat Flotilla; 6 July 1944 – 1 January 1945; 5th U-boat Flotilla; 1 January – 8 May 1945
- Identification codes: M 51 550
- Commanders: Kptlt. Max Bernd Dieterich; 27 August 1942 – 22 February 1943; Kptlt. Günther Zedelius; 23 February 1943 – 20 July 1944; Oblt.z.S. Fritz Fabricius; 21 July – 30 September 1944; Kptlt. Wolfgang Riekeberg; 1 October 1944 – 26 April 1945; Oblt.z.S. Walter Ehrhardt; January 1945; Oblt.z.S. Klaus Weber; 27 April – 9 May 1945
- Operations: 3 patrols: 1st patrol: 25 November 1944 – 13 January 1945; 2nd patrol: 5 – 13 April 1945; 3rd patrol: 23 – 28 April 1945
- Victories: 1 warship sunk (39 tons)

German submarine U-637 was a Type VIIC U-boat built for Nazi Germany's Kriegsmarine for service during World War II. She was laid down on 17 October 1941 by Blohm & Voss, Hamburg as yard number 613, launched on 7 July 1942 and commissioned on 27 August 1942 under Kapitänleutnant Max Bernd Dieterich.

== Design ==
German Type VIIC submarines were preceded by the shorter Type VIIB submarines. U-637 had a displacement of 769 tonnes (757 long tons) when at the surface and 871 tonnes (857 long tons) while submerged. She had a total length of 67.10 m (220 ft 2 in), a pressure hull length of 50.50 m (165 ft 8 in), a beam of 6.20 m (20 ft 4 in), a height of 9.60 m (31 ft 6 in), and a draught of 4.74 m (15 ft 7 in). The submarine was powered by two Germaniawerft F46 four-stroke, six-cylinder supercharged diesel engines producing a total of 2,800 to 3,200 metric horsepower (2,060 to 2,350 kW; 2,760 to 3,160 shp) for use while surfaced, two BBC GG UB 720/8 double-acting electric motors producing a total of 750 metric horsepower (550 kW; 740 shp) for use while submerged. She had two shafts and two 1.23 m (4 ft) propellers. The boat was capable of operating at depths of up to 230 metres (750 ft).

The submarine had a maximum surface speed of 17.7 knots (32.8 km/h; 20.4 mph) and a maximum submerged speed of 7.6 knots (14.1 km/h; 8.7 mph). When submerged, the boat could operate for 80 nautical miles (150 km; 92 mi) at 4 knots (7.4 km/h; 4.6 mph); when surfaced, she could travel 8,500 nautical miles (15,700 km; 9,800 mi) at 10 knots (19 km/h; 12 mph). U-637 was fitted with five 53.3 cm (21 in) torpedo tubes (four fitted at the bow and one at the stern), fourteen torpedoes, one 8.8 cm (3.46 in) SK C/35 naval gun, 220 rounds, and one twin 2 cm (0.79 in) C/30 anti-aircraft gun. The boat had a complement of between forty-four and sixty.

== Service history ==
The boat's career began with training at 5th U-boat Flotilla on 27 August 1942, followed by active service on 1 June 1944 as part of the 1st Flotilla.

In three patrols she sank one warship, for a total of 39 tons.

=== Fate ===
U-637 surrendered on 9 May 1945 at Stavanger and later sunk as part of Operation Deadlight on 21 December 1945 at position 55°35′N 07°46′W.

== Summary of raiding history ==
Date	Ship Name	Nationality	Tonnage (Note: Merchant ship tonnages are in gross register tons. Military vessels are listed by tons displacement.)	Fate
24 December 1944	BMO-594	Soviet Navy	39	Sunk

== Bibliography ==
- Busch, Rainer; Röll, Hans-Joachim (1999). German U-boat commanders of World War II : a biographical dictionary. Translated by Brooks, Geoffrey. London, Annapolis, Md: Greenhill Books, Naval Institute Press. ISBN 1-55750-186-6.
- Busch, Rainer; Röll, Hans-Joachim (1999). Der U-Boot-Krieg, 1939-1945: Deutsche U-Boot-Verluste von September 1939 bis Mai 1945 [German U-boat losses from September 1939 to May 1945] (in German). Vol. IV. Hamburg, Berlin, Bonn: Mittler. ISBN 3-8132-0514-2.
- Gröner, Eric; Jung, Dieter; Maass, Martin (1991). German Warships 1815-1945: U-boats and Mine Warfare Vessels. Vol. 2. Translated by Thomas, Keith; Magowan, Rachel. London: Conway Maritime Press. ISBN 0-85177-593-4.
- Sharpe, Peter (1998). U-Boat Fact File. Great Britain: Midland Publishing. ISBN 1-85780-072-9.
