= HMS Curzon (K513) =

Frigate of the Royal Navy

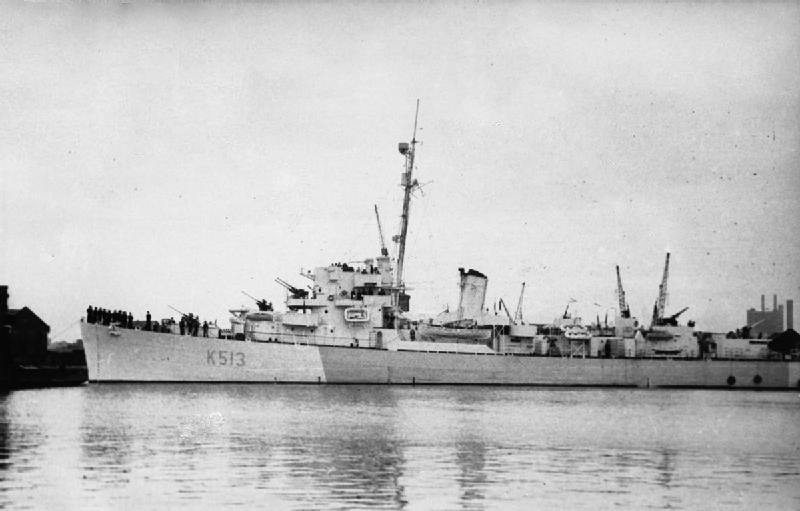

History

United Kingdom
- Name: HMS Curzon
- Builder: Bethlehem-Hingham Shipyard, Hingham, Massachusetts
- Laid down: 23 June 1943
- Launched: 18 September 1943
- Commissioned: 20 November 1943
- Decommissioned: 27 March 1946
- Stricken: 1 May 1946
- Honours and awards: English Channel; North Foreland; North Sea
- Fate: Sold for scrapping, 4 November 1946

General characteristics
- Class & type: Captain-class frigate
- Displacement: 1,400 long tons (1,422 t) standard; 1,740 long tons (1,768 t) full
- Length: 306 ft (93 m) o/a; 300 ft (91 m) w/l
- Beam: 36 ft 9 in (11.20 m)
- Draught: 9 ft (2.7 m)
- Propulsion: 2 × Foster Wheeler Express "D"-type water-tube boilers; GE 13,500 shp (10,067 kW) steam turbines and generators (9,200 kW); Electric motors 12,000 shp (8,948 kW); 2 shafts
- Speed: 24 knots (44 km/h; 28 mph)
- Range: 5,500 nmi (10,200 km) at 15 kn (28 km/h; 17 mph)
- Complement: 186
- Electronic warfare & decoys: SA & SL type radars; Type 144 series Asdic; MF Direction Finding antenna; HF Direction Finding Type FH 4 antenna
- Armament: 3 × 3 in (76 mm) /50 Mk.22 guns; 1 × twin Bofors 40 mm mount Mk.I; 7–16 × 20 mm Oerlikon guns; Mark 10 Hedgehog anti-submarine mortar; Depth charges; QF 2-pounder naval gun

Service record
- Commanders: Lt.Cdr. Allen A. Diggens, RN; (November 1943–February 1945); Lt. D. Walters, RN; (February 1945–March 1946)
- Victories: U-212 (21 July 1944); E-boat S912 (23 December 1944)

HMS Curzon (K513) was a Captain-class frigate of the British Royal Navy that served during World War II. The ship was laid down as a Buckley-class destroyer escort at the Bethlehem-Hingham Shipyard at Hingham, Massachusetts on 23 June 1943, with the hull number DE-84, and launched on 18 September 1943. The ship was transferred to the UK under Lend-Lease on 20 November 1943, and named after either Captain Henry Curzon, who commanded Pallas at the First Battle of Groix (1795), or Captain Edward Curzon who commanded Asia at the Battle of Navarino (1827). There is official uncertainty about which is correct.

== Service history ==
Curzon was attached to the 16th Escort Group, based at Sheerness, part of Nore Command, for coastal convoy escort duty. She was not involved in the Normandy landings on 6 June 1944, but afterwards escorted convoys to the invasion beaches. On 21 July Curzon and Ekins sank the U-212 south of Beachy Head.

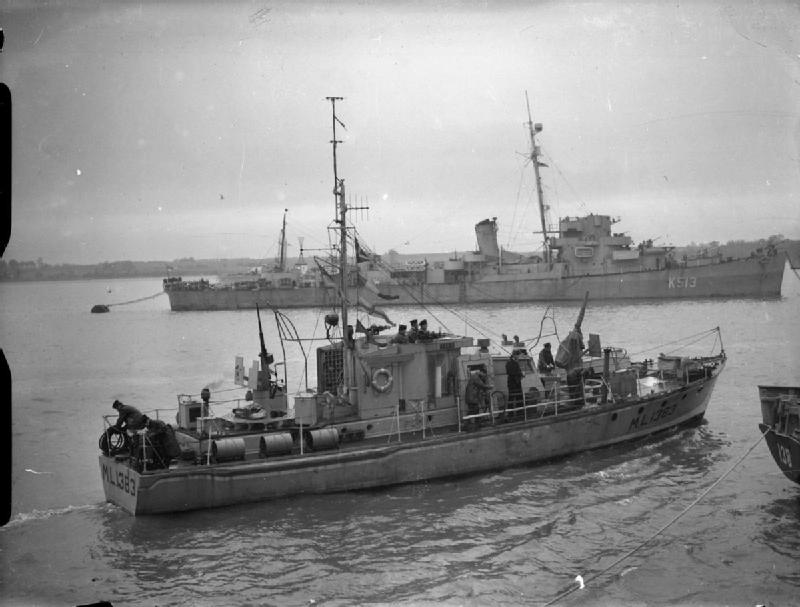
HMS Curzon at Harwich

Towards the end of 1944 Curzon became a Coastal Forces Control Frigate (CFCF), controlling a flotilla of Motor Torpedo Boats operating in the Channel and North Sea to counter the threat of enemy E-boats.

On the night of 22/23 December 1944, Curzon, Torrington, the destroyer Walpole and the sloop Kittiwake were on patrol off Ostend when they engaged a group of mine-laying E-boats. Curzon sank S192 and damaged two others. On 14/15 January 1945 Curzon and the destroyer Cotswold were on patrol off Westkapelle, when a group of five E-boats fired on a convoy with long-range torpedoes, claiming two hits. Curzon and Cotswold attacked, scattering the enemy. At 01:27 on 17 January 1945 Curzon and Cotswold were patrolling off the Scheldt estuary when they made radar contact with two groups of E-Boats. Cotswold attacked the nearest group, while Curzon closed to within 3,000 yards of the other before opening fire. The enemy laid a smoke screen and retreated at high speed into shallow water. The E-boats regrouped and attempted another attack, but it was also repulsed.

Curzon was then refitted at Tilbury. Her 2-pounder "pom pom" bow chaser was removed, the two 20 mm Oerlikons mounted in front of the bridge were replaced with two single 40 mm Bofors, and splinter shields were fitted to her 3-inch (76 mm) guns.

After VE Day Curzon was refitted for service with the British Pacific Fleet, but this assignment was later cancelled, and she remained in home waters until returned to the U.S. Navy on 27 March 1946.
