= German submarine U-212 =

German World War II submarine

Coordinates: 50°27′N 0°13′W

History

Nazi Germany
- Name: U-212
- Ordered: 16 October 1939
- Builder: Germaniawerft, Kiel
- Yard number: 641
- Laid down: 17 May 1941
- Launched: 11 March 1942
- Commissioned: 25 April 1942
- Fate: Sunk on 21 July 1944

General characteristics
- Class & type: Type VIIC submarine
- Displacement: 769 tonnes (757 long tons) surfaced; 871 t (857 long tons) submerged
- Length: 67.10 m (220 ft 2 in) o/a; 50.50 m (165 ft 8 in) pressure hull
- Beam: 6.20 m (20 ft 4 in) o/a; 4.70 m (15 ft 5 in) pressure hull
- Draught: 4.74 m (15 ft 7 in)
- Installed power: 2,800–3,200 PS (2,100–2,400 kW; 2,800–3,200 bhp) (diesels); 750 PS (550 kW; 740 shp) (electric)
- Propulsion: 2 shafts; 2 × diesel engines; 2 × electric motors
- Speed: 17.7 knots (32.8 km/h; 20.4 mph) surfaced; 7.6 knots (14.1 km/h; 8.7 mph) submerged
- Range: 8,500 nmi (15,700 km; 9,800 mi) at 10 knots (19 km/h; 12 mph) surfaced; 80 nmi (150 km; 92 mi) at 4 knots (7.4 km/h; 4.6 mph) submerged
- Test depth: 230 m (750 ft); Crush depth: 250–295 m (820–968 ft)
- Complement: 4 officers, 40–56 enlisted
- Armament: 5 × 53.3 cm (21 in) torpedo tubes (four bow, one stern); 14 × G7e torpedoes or 26 TMA mines; 1 × 8.8 cm (3.46 in) deck gun; AA guns (2 cm FlaK 30)

Service record
- Part of: 8th U-boat Flotilla; 25 April – 30 September 1942; 11th U-boat Flotilla; 1 October 1942 – 31 May 1943; 13th U-boat Flotilla; 1 June – 31 October 1943; 3rd U-boat Flotilla; 1 November 1943 – 21 July 1944
- Identification codes: M 44 245
- Commanders: Oblt.z.S. / Kptlt. Helmut Vogler; 25 April 1942 – 21 July 1944
- Operations: 12 patrols: 1st patrol: 12 – 26 September 1942; 2nd patrol: 10 October – 5 November 1942; 3rd patrol: a. 19 November – 25 December 1942; b. 28 – 31 December 1942; 4th patrol: a. 28 February – 1 March 1943; b. 8 March – 7 April 1943; 5th patrol: 20 April – 16 May 1943; 6th patrol: 3 June – 12 July 1943; 7th patrol: a. 26 July – 4 August 1943; b. 5 – 10 August 1943; 8th patrol: 11 October – 2 December 1943; 9th patrol: a. 10 January – 12 March 1944; b. 8 – 10 April 1944; 10th patrol: a. 6 – 9 June 1944; b. 12 – 16 June 1944; 11th patrol: 22 – 24 June 1944; 12th patrol: a. 28 June – 1 July 1944; b. 5 – 21 July 1944
- Victories: 1 merchant ship sunk (80 GRT)

German submarine U-212 was a Type VIIC U-boat that served with the Kriegsmarine during World War II. Laid down on 17 May 1941 as yard number 641 at F. Krupp Germaniawerft in Kiel, she was launched on 11 March 1942 and commissioned on 25 April under the command of Oberleutnant zur See Helmut Vogler.

She began her service career in training with the 8th U-boat Flotilla. She was transferred to the 11th flotilla on 1 October 1942, the 13th flotilla on 1 June 1943 and the 3rd flotilla on 1 November.

She was a member of thirteen wolfpacks. She carried out twelve patrols, but sank only one ship.

She was sunk by British warships on 21 July 1944.

== Design ==
German Type VIIC submarines were preceded by the shorter Type VIIB submarines. U-212 had a displacement of 769 tonnes (757 long tons) when at the surface and 871 tonnes (857 long tons) while submerged. She had a total length of 67.10 m (220 ft 2 in), a pressure hull length of 50.50 m (165 ft 8 in), a beam of 6.20 m (20 ft 4 in), a height of 9.60 m (31 ft 6 in), and a draught of 4.74 m (15 ft 7 in). The submarine was powered by two Germaniawerft F46 four-stroke, six-cylinder supercharged diesel engines producing a total of 2,800 to 3,200 metric horsepower (2,060 to 2,350 kW; 2,760 to 3,160 shp) for use while surfaced, two AEG GU 460/8–27 double-acting electric motors producing a total of 750 metric horsepower (550 kW; 740 shp) for use while submerged. She had two shafts and two 1.23 m (4 ft) propellers. The boat was capable of operating at depths of up to 230 metres (750 ft).

The submarine had a maximum surface speed of 17.7 knots (32.8 km/h; 20.4 mph) and a maximum submerged speed of 7.6 knots (14.1 km/h; 8.7 mph). When submerged, the boat could operate for 80 nautical miles (150 km; 92 mi) at 4 knots (7.4 km/h; 4.6 mph); when surfaced, she could travel 8,500 nautical miles (15,700 km; 9,800 mi) at 10 knots (19 km/h; 12 mph). U-212 was fitted with five 53.3 cm (21 in) torpedo tubes (four fitted at the bow and one at the stern), fourteen torpedoes, one 8.8 cm (3.46 in) SK C/35 naval gun, 220 rounds, and a 2 cm (0.79 in) C/30 anti-aircraft gun. The boat had a complement of between forty-four and sixty.

== Service history ==
=== First to sixth patrols ===
Her first six patrols were of little interest; being confined to the waters of the north: around Iceland, Greenland, Bear Island and Jan Mayen Island. In that time (September 1942 to July 1943), she was based at Narvik, Bergen and Hammerfest in Norway.

=== Seventh patrol ===
It was during this sortie that the boat could claim her only victim; the Soviet Majakovski, sunk by a mine on 5 August 1943, laid by U-212 on 31 July.

=== Eighth patrol ===
The submarine departed Bergen and Norwegian waters, on 11 October 1943. Passing through the gap between Iceland and the Faroe Islands, she headed for Newfoundland, docking at La Pallice / La Rochelle in occupied France, on 2 December.

=== Ninth patrol ===
Patrol number nine was U-212's longest, at 63 days.

She was strafed by an unidentified Leigh Light – equipped aircraft on 14 January 1944. The 37mm AA gun malfunctioned after just one round was fired and the barrel of a 20mm weapon burst. No damage was inflicted by the air attack on the outbound U-boat.

On 25 February 1944, she met U-549 to transfer some radar detection equipment. Both submarines were caught on the surface by an unidentified Catalina flying boat. U-549 dived immediately, but U-212 chose to put up some resistance before joining her sister. The boat was not damaged.

She was also unsuccessfully attacked by an unidentified B-24 Liberator on 8 March while inbound.

=== Tenth patrol ===
If her ninth foray was her longest, her tenth and thirteenth outings were the shortest – three days each. They both started and finished in La Pallice.

This mission was also cut short; while sailing to interfere with the D-Day landings, the boat was attacked by two 57mm Tsetse cannon-firing Mosquitoes of No. 228 Squadron RAF. U-212 returned to base for repairs on 9 June 1944.

=== Eleventh patrol ===
The boat did not get out of the Bay of Biscay, moving to Brest at the end of her fourteenth effort.

=== Twelfth patrol and loss ===
She left France for the last time on 5 July 1944. She was sunk south of Brighton in the English Channel on 21 July by depth charges dropped from the British frigates HMS Curzon and Ekins.

Forty-nine men died; there were no survivors.

=== Wolfpacks ===
U-212 took part in thirteen wolfpacks, namely:

- Boreas (22 November – 9 December 1942)
- Eisbär (27 March – 5 April 1943)
- Siegfried (25– 27 October 1943)
- Siegfried 1 (27– 30 October 1943)
- Körner (30 October – 2 November 1943)
- Tirpitz 1 (2 – 8 November 1943)
- Eisenhart 4 (9 – 15 November 1943)
- Schill 3 (18 – 22 November 1943)
- Rügen (15 – 26 January 1944)
- Hinein (26 January – 3 February 1944)
- Igel 1 (3 – 17 February 1944)
- Hai 1 (17 – 22 February 1944)
- Preussen (22 February – 4 March 1944)

== Summary of raiding history ==
Date	Ship Name	Nationality	Tonnage (GRT)	Fate
5 August 1943	Majakovski	Soviet Union	80	Sunk

== Bibliography ==
- Busch, Rainer; Röll, Hans-Joachim (1999). German U-boat commanders of World War II : a biographical dictionary. Translated by Brooks, Geoffrey. London, Annapolis, Md: Greenhill Books, Naval Institute Press. ISBN 1-55750-186-6.
- Busch, Rainer; Röll, Hans-Joachim (1999). Deutsche U-Boot-Verluste von September 1939 bis Mai 1945 [German U-boat losses from September 1939 to May 1945]. Der U-Boot-Krieg (in German). Vol. IV. Hamburg, Berlin, Bonn: Mittler. ISBN 3-8132-0514-2.
- Gröner, Erich; Jung, Dieter; Maass, Martin (1991). U-boats and Mine Warfare Vessels. German Warships 1815–1945. Vol. 2. Translated by Thomas, Keith; Magowan, Rachel. London: Conway Maritime Press. ISBN 0-85177-593-4.
- Bishop, Chris (2006). Kriegsmarine U-Boats, 1939-45. London: Amber Books. ISBN 978-1-904687-96-2.
