= German submarine U-322 =

German World War II submarine

History

Nazi Germany
- Name: U-322
- Ordered: 14 October 1941
- Builder: Flender Werke, Lübeck
- Yard number: 322
- Laid down: 13 February 1943
- Launched: 18 December 1943
- Commissioned: 5 February 1944
- Fate: Sunk on 29 December 1944

General characteristics
- Class & type: Type VIIC/41 submarine
- Displacement: 759 tonnes (747 long tons) surfaced; 860 t (846 long tons) submerged
- Length: 67.23 m (220 ft 7 in) o/a; 50.50 m (165 ft 8 in) pressure hull
- Beam: 6.20 m (20 ft 4 in) o/a; 4.70 m (15 ft 5 in) pressure hull
- Height: 9.60 m (31 ft 6 in)
- Draught: 4.74 m (15 ft 7 in)
- Installed power: 2,800–3,200 PS (2,100–2,400 kW; 2,800–3,200 bhp) (diesels); 750 PS (550 kW; 740 shp) (electric)
- Propulsion: 2 shafts; 2 × diesel engines; 2 × electric motors
- Speed: 17.7 knots (32.8 km/h; 20.4 mph) surfaced; 7.6 knots (14.1 km/h; 8.7 mph) submerged
- Range: 8,500 nmi (15,700 km; 9,800 mi) at 10 knots (19 km/h; 12 mph) surfaced; 80 nmi (150 km; 92 mi) at 4 knots (7.4 km/h; 4.6 mph) submerged
- Test depth: 250 m (820 ft); Crush depth: 275–325 m (902–1,066 ft)
- Complement: 4 officers, 40–56 enlisted
- Armament: 5 × 53.3 cm (21 in) torpedo tubes (four bow, one stern); 14 × torpedoes; 1 × 8.8 cm (3.46 in) deck gun (220 rounds); 1 × 3.7 cm (1.5 in) Flak M42 AA gun; 2 × 2 cm (0.79 in) C/30 AA guns

Service record
- Part of: 4th U-boat Flotilla; 5 February – 31 October 1944; 11th U-boat Flotilla; 1 November – 29 December 1944
- Identification codes: M 49 889
- Commanders: Oblt.z.S. Gerhard Wysk; 5 February – 29 December 1944
- Operations: 2 patrols: 1st patrol: 2 – 6 November 1944; 2nd patrol: 15 November – 29 December 1944
- Victories: 1 merchant ship sunk (5,149 GRT); 2 merchant ships total loss (14,367 GRT)

German submarine U-322 was a Type VIIC/41 U-boat of Nazi Germany's Kriegsmarine during World War II.

She carried out two patrols, sinking one ship of 5,149 gross register tons (GRT) and causing two others totaling 14,367 GRT to be declared total losses.

The boat was sunk on 29 December 1944 by HMCS Calgary in the English Channel.

== Design ==
German Type VIIC/41 submarines were preceded by the heavier Type VIIC submarines. U-322 had a displacement of 759 tonnes (747 long tons) when at the surface and 860 tonnes (850 long tons) while submerged. She had a total length of 67.10 m (220 ft 2 in), a pressure hull length of 50.50 m (165 ft 8 in), a beam of 6.20 m (20 ft 4 in), a height of 9.60 m (31 ft 6 in), and a draught of 4.74 m (15 ft 7 in). The submarine was powered by two Germaniawerft F46 four-stroke, six-cylinder supercharged diesel engines producing a total of 2,800 to 3,200 metric horsepower (2,060 to 2,350 kW; 2,760 to 3,160 shp) for use while surfaced, two Garbe, Lahmeyer & Co. RP 137/c double-acting electric motors producing a total of 750 metric horsepower (550 kW; 740 shp) for use while submerged. She had two shafts and two 1.23 m (4 ft) propellers. The boat was capable of operating at depths of up to 230 metres (750 ft).

The submarine had a maximum surface speed of 17.7 knots (32.8 km/h; 20.4 mph) and a maximum submerged speed of 7.6 knots (14.1 km/h; 8.7 mph). When submerged, the boat could operate for 80 nautical miles (150 km; 92 mi) at 4 knots (7.4 km/h; 4.6 mph); when surfaced, she could travel 8,500 nautical miles (15,700 km; 9,800 mi) at 10 knots (19 km/h; 12 mph). U-322 was fitted with five 53.3 cm (21 in) torpedo tubes (four fitted at the bow and one at the stern), fourteen torpedoes, one 8.8 cm (3.46 in) SK C/35 naval gun, (220 rounds), one 3.7 cm (1.5 in) Flak M42 and two 2 cm (0.79 in) C/30 anti-aircraft guns. The boat had a complement of between forty-four and sixty.

== Service history ==
The submarine was laid down on 13 February 1943 by the Flender Werke yard at Lübeck as yard number 322, launched on 18 December and commissioned on 5 February 1944 under the command of Oberleutnant zur See Gerhard Wysk.

She served with the 4th U-boat Flotilla for training, from 5 February 1944 to 31 October and the 11th flotilla for operations until her sinking on 29 December.

=== First patrol ===
U-322 departed Kiel on 2 November 1944 and arrived in Horten Naval Base (south of Oslo), on the sixth.

=== Second patrol and loss ===
The boat left Horten on 15 November 1944, heading for the 'gap' between the Faroe and Shetland Islands and passing west of Ireland. On 23 December, she sank Dumfries off St Catherine's Point, Isle of Wight in the English Channel. On the 29th, seven miles off the Portland lighthouse near Weymouth, she attacked Arthur Sewall and Black Hawk, causing both vessels to be declared a total loss. She was sunk on the same day by depth charges dropped from the Canadian corvette HMCS Calgary.

Fifty two men died; there were no survivors.

=== Previously recorded fate ===
U-322 was sunk on 25 November 1944 west of the Shetland Islands by the British frigate HMS Ascension.

=== Discovery ===
The wreck has been found; although it was originally thought to be that of U-772, it has been identified as U-322.

== Summary of raiding history ==
Date	Name	Nationality	Tonnage (GRT)	Fate
23 December 1944	Dumfries	United Kingdom	5,149	Sunk
29 December 1944	Arthur Sewall	United States	7,176	Total loss
29 December 1944	Black Hawk	United States	7,191	Total loss

== See also ==
- Battle of the Atlantic (1939-1945)

== Bibliography ==
- Busch, Rainer; Röll, Hans-Joachim (1999). German U-boat commanders of World War II : a biographical dictionary. Translated by Brooks, Geoffrey. London, Annapolis, Md: Greenhill Books, Naval Institute Press. ISBN 1-55750-186-6.
- Busch, Rainer; Röll, Hans-Joachim (1999). Der U-Boot-Krieg, 1939-1945: Deutsche U-Boot-Verluste von September 1939 bis Mai 1945 [German U-boat losses from September 1939 to May 1945] (in German). Vol. IV. Hamburg, Berlin, Bonn: Mittler. ISBN 3-8132-0514-2.
- Gröner, Erich; Jung, Dieter; Maass, Martin (1991). U-boats and Mine Warfare Vessels. German Warships 1815–1945. Vol. 2. Translated by Thomas, Keith; Magowan, Rachel. London: Conway Maritime Press. ISBN 0-85177-593-4.
