= German submarine U-956 =

German World War II submarine

Coordinates: 55°50′N 10°05′W

History

Nazi Germany
- Name: U-956
- Ordered: 10 April 1941
- Builder: Blohm & Voss, Hamburg
- Yard number: 156
- Laid down: 20 February 1942
- Launched: 14 November 1942
- Commissioned: 6 January 1943
- Fate: Surrendered on 13 May 1945 at Loch Eriboll; sunk as part of Operation Deadlight on 17 December 1945

General characteristics
- Class & type: Type VIIC submarine
- Displacement: 769 tonnes (757 long tons) surfaced; 871 t (857 long tons) submerged
- Length: 67.10 m (220 ft 2 in) o/a; 50.50 m (165 ft 8 in) pressure hull
- Beam: 6.20 m (20 ft 4 in) o/a; 4.70 m (15 ft 5 in) pressure hull
- Draught: 4.74 m (15 ft 7 in)
- Installed power: 2,800–3,200 PS (2,100–2,400 kW; 2,800–3,200 bhp) (diesels); 750 PS (550 kW; 740 shp) (electric)
- Propulsion: 2 shafts; 2 × diesel engines; 2 × electric motors
- Speed: 17.7 knots (32.8 km/h; 20.4 mph) surfaced; 7.6 knots (14.1 km/h; 8.7 mph) submerged
- Range: 8,500 nmi (15,700 km; 9,800 mi) at 10 knots (19 km/h; 12 mph) surfaced; 80 nmi (150 km; 92 mi) at 4 knots (7.4 km/h; 4.6 mph) submerged
- Test depth: 230 m (750 ft); Crush depth: 250–295 m (820–968 ft)
- Complement: 4 officers, 40–56 enlisted
- Armament: 5 × 53.3 cm (21 in) torpedo tubes (4 bow, 1 stern); 14 × torpedoes or 26 TMA mines; 1 × 8.8 cm (3.46 in) deck gun (220 rounds); 1 × twin 2 cm (0.79 in) C/30 anti-aircraft gun

Service record
- Part of: 5th U-boat Flotilla; 6 January – 30 June 1943; 1st U-boat Flotilla; 1 July – 31 December 1943; 11th U-boat Flotilla; 1 January – 30 September 1944; 13th U-boat Flotilla; 1 October 1944 – 8 May 1945
- Identification codes: M 49 622
- Commanders: Oblt.z.S. / Kptlt. Hans-Dieter Mohs; 6 January 1943 – 13 May 1945
- Operations: 13 patrols: 1st patrol: 18 August – 13 September 1943; 2nd patrol: a. 23 September – 4 November 1943; b. 5 – 8 November 1943; 3rd patrol: 28 December 1943 – 7 January 1944; 4th patrol: 8 – 18 January 1944; 5th patrol: 25 January – 2 February 1944; 6th patrol: 15 February – 2 March 1944; 7th patrol: a. 23 March – 8 April 1944; b. 9 – 12 April 1944; c. 3 – 8 June 1944; d. 9 – 10 June 1944; e. 23 June 1944; 8th patrol: a. 26 June – 24 July 1944; b. 24 July 1944; c. 27 – 28 August 1944; d. 28 August; 9th patrol: a. 29 August – 5 September 1944; b. 6 – 8 September 1944; 10th patrol: 14 September – 3 October 1944; 11th patrol: 15 October – 24 November 1944; 12th patrol: a. 11 December 1944 – 20 January 1945; b. 22 – 25 January 1945; 13th patrol: 2 April – 13 May 1945
- Victories: 1 warship sunk (1,190 tons); 1 merchant ship total loss (7,176 GRT)

German submarine U-956 was a Type VIIC U-boat built for Nazi Germany's Kriegsmarine for service during World War II. She was laid down on 20 February 1942 by Blohm & Voss, Hamburg as yard number 156, launched on 14 November 1942 and commissioned on 6 January 1943 under Oberleutnant zur See Hans-Dieter Mohs.

== Design ==
German Type VIIC submarines were preceded by the shorter Type VIIB submarines. U-956 had a displacement of 769 tonnes (757 long tons) when at the surface and 871 tonnes (857 long tons) while submerged. She had a total length of 67.10 m (220 ft 2 in), a pressure hull length of 50.50 m (165 ft 8 in), a beam of 6.20 m (20 ft 4 in), a height of 9.60 m (31 ft 6 in), and a draught of 4.74 m (15 ft 7 in). The submarine was powered by two Germaniawerft F46 four-stroke, six-cylinder supercharged diesel engines producing a total of 2,800 to 3,200 metric horsepower (2,060 to 2,350 kW; 2,760 to 3,160 shp) for use while surfaced, two Brown, Boveri & Cie GG UB 720/8 double-acting electric motors producing a total of 750 metric horsepower (550 kW; 740 shp) for use while submerged. She had two shafts and two 1.23 m (4 ft) propellers. The boat was capable of operating at depths of up to 230 metres (750 ft).

The submarine had a maximum surface speed of 17.7 knots (32.8 km/h; 20.4 mph) and a maximum submerged speed of 7.6 knots (14.1 km/h; 8.7 mph). When submerged, the boat could operate for 80 nautical miles (150 km; 92 mi) at 4 knots (7.4 km/h; 4.6 mph); when surfaced, she could travel 8,500 nautical miles (15,700 km; 9,800 mi) at 10 knots (19 km/h; 12 mph). U-956 was fitted with five 53.3 cm (21 in) torpedo tubes (four fitted at the bow and one at the stern), fourteen torpedoes, one 8.8 cm (3.46 in) SK C/35 naval gun, 220 rounds, and one twin 2 cm (0.79 in) C/30 anti-aircraft gun. The boat had a complement of between forty-four and sixty.

== Service history ==
The boat's career began with training at 5th Flotilla on 6 January 1943, followed by active service on 1 July 1943 as part of the 1st Flotilla.

=== Fate ===
U-956 surrendered on 13 May 1945 at Loch Eriboll. She was then transferred to Lisahally, Northern Ireland on 29 May 1945 as part of Operation Deadlight and sunk by naval gunfire on 17 December 1945.

== Summary of raiding history ==
Date	Ship Name	Nationality	Tonnage (Note: Merchant ship tonnages are in gross register tons. Military vessels are listed by tons displacement.)	Fate
30 December 1944	Tbilisi	Soviet Union	7,176	Total loss
16 January 1945	Dejatelnyj	Soviet Navy	1,190	Sunk

== Bibliography ==
- Busch, Rainer; Röll, Hans-Joachim (1999). German U-boat commanders of World War II : a biographical dictionary. Translated by Brooks, Geoffrey. London, Annapolis, Md: Greenhill Books, Naval Institute Press. ISBN 1-55750-186-6.
- Gröner, Eric; Jung, Dieter; Maass, Martin (1991). German Warships 1815-1945: U-boats and Mine Warfare Vessels. Vol. 2. Translated by Thomas, Keith; Magowan, Rachel. London: Conway Maritime Press. ISBN 0-85177-593-4.
- Sharpe, Peter (1998). U-Boat Fact File. Great Britain: Midland Publishing. ISBN 1-85780-072-9.
