= SS Léopoldville (1928) =

Belgian ocean liner converted into an Allied troop ship during WWII

Coordinates: 49°45′57″N 01°36′20″W

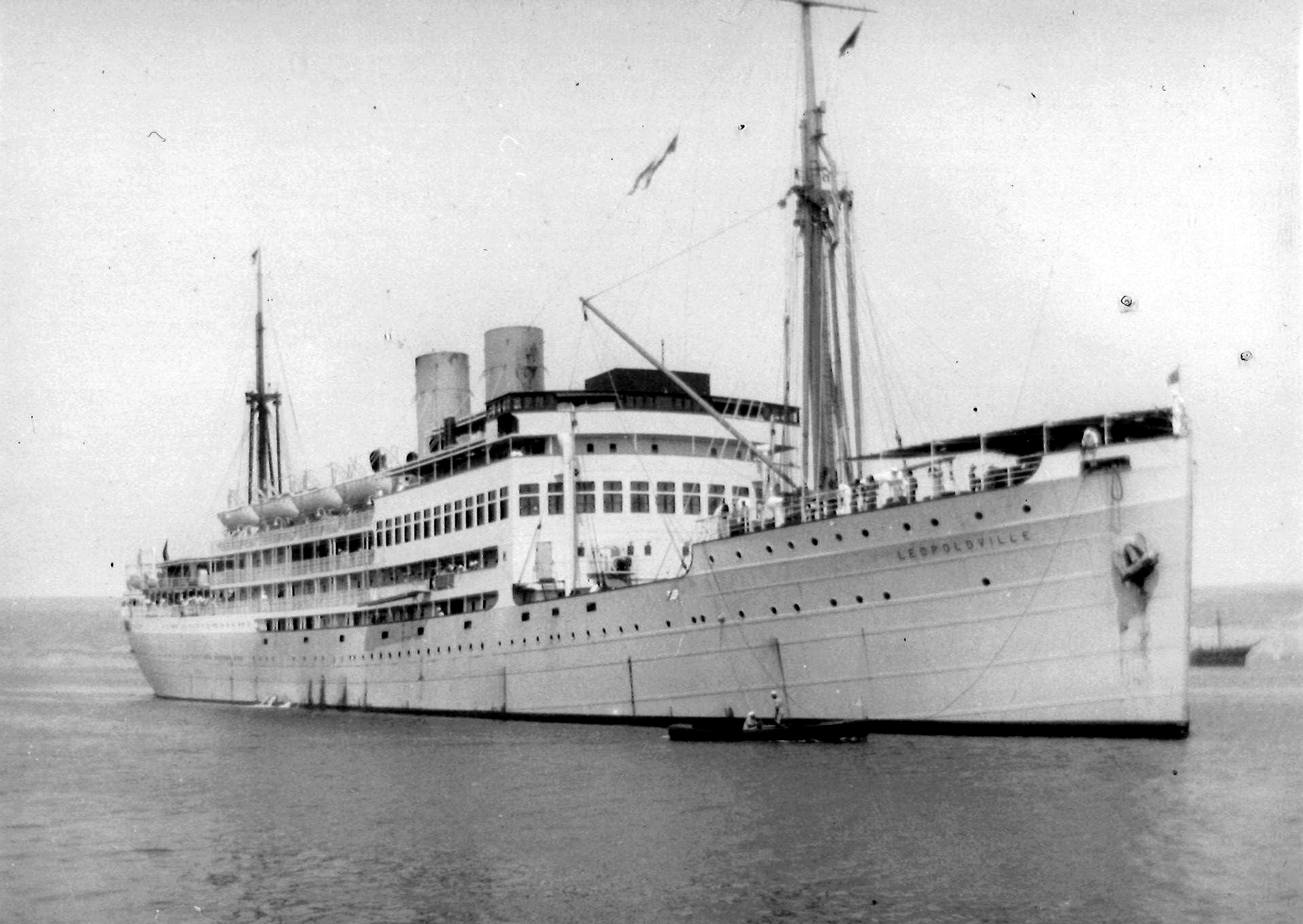
- Léopoldville

History

Belgium
- Name: Léopoldville
- Namesake: Léopoldville
- Operator: Compagnie Belge Maritime du Congo; (Later Compagnie Maritime Belge (Lloyd Royal) SA), Antwerp
- Port of registry: Antwerp
- Builder: John Cockerill SA, Hoboken, Antwerp
- Yard number: 623
- Launched: 26 September 1928
- Completed: 1929
- Identification: Belgian Official Number 120; code letters MLFP (until 1933); call sign ONLB (1934 onward)
- Fate: Torpedoed and sunk, 24 December 1944

General characteristics
- Tonnage: 11,256 GRT, 6,521 NRT (1919–37); 11,509 GRT, 6,941 NRT (1937–44)
- Length: 478 ft 8 in (145.90 m)
- Beam: 62 ft 2 in (18.95 m)
- Draught: 25 ft 9.75 in (7.8677 m)
- Depth: 35 ft 0 in (10.67 m)
- Installed power: 1,019 NHP until 1935; 1,197 NHP 1936 onward
- Propulsion: 2 × quadruple-expansion engines; 2 × exhaust steam turbines (added 1936); 2 × screw propellers
- Speed: 16 knots (30 km/h)
- Capacity: 360 passengers (peacetime); 8,458 cubic feet (239.5 m^{3}) refrigerated cargo space (peacetime); 5,000 troops (wartime)
- Crew: 213 plus 24 DEMS gunners

SS Léopoldville was a 11,509 GRT passenger liner of the Compagnie Belge Maritime du Congo. She was converted for use as a troopship in the Second World War, and on 24 December 1944, while sailing between Southampton and Cherbourg, was torpedoed and sunk by the German submarine U-486. As a result, about 763 US soldiers and 15 officers of the ship's crew died. The crew had abandoned ship and left U.S. troops without proper evacuation orders.

== Description ==
Léopoldville was 478 feet 8 inches (145.90 m) long, with a beam of 62 feet 2 inches (18.95 m). She had a depth of 35 feet 0 inches (10.67 m) and a draught of 25 feet 9.75 inches (7.8677 m). Her tonnages were 11,256 GRT and 6,521 NRT until 1936, when they were revised to 11,509 GRT and 6,941 NRT.

She had 8,458 cubic feet (239.5 m^{3}) of refrigerated cargo space.

The ship was built with two 1,019 nhp 4-cylinder quadruple-expansion steam engines which had cylinder diameters of 28 25/16, 33 7/8, 48 7/16 and 68 7/8 inches (75, 86, 123 and 175 cm) diameter by 48 7/16 inches (123 cm) stroke. The engines drove twin screw propellers.

In 1936 two Bauer-Wach low-pressure exhaust turbines were added, each driving one of the shafts via double-reduction gearing and a Föttinger fluid coupling. Each turbine ran on exhaust steam from the piston engine on the same shaft. The turbines increased Léopoldville's total power to 1,197 NHP.

== Service ==
The vessel was built for the Compagnie Maritime Belge as the fifth to bear the name Léopoldville and initially served on the route between Belgium and its African colony, the Belgian Congo. Her Belgian Official Number was 120. Her code letters were MLTP until 1933–34, when they were superseded by the call sign ONLB.

When Belgium entered the second world war on 10 May 1940 with the German invasion of Belgium, the Léopoldville was returning from Matadi. She was diverted to La Pallice in France and remained there until 30 May. When the fall of France approached the ship left for Matadi where she arrived on 19 June. On 30 July Léopoldville left for New York, arrived on 17 August and the next month she left for Liverpool. In Liverpool she was modified into a troopship. On 11 November Léopoldville started her career as a troop transport with three trips to Saint John, New Brunswick with a thousand Royal Air Force recruits which will receive training in Canada. The ship was not fit for North-Atlantic conditions and suffered damage in each journey. Léopoldville was reallocated to the South-Atlantic and transferred troops between Freetown, Cape Town, Durban, Mombasa and Suez. On each trip she had on average 2,000 troops on board. Between November 1942 and January 1943 Léopoldville was operating between Glasgow and Algiers, ferrying troops for the North African campaign. From 29 January 1943 on, she was back on the routes between Suez and Africa. In July 1943 she participated in the Allied invasion of Sicily. Until April 1944 Léopoldville remained in the Mediterranean Sea, transferring troops between Gibraltar, Algiers, Bône, Augusta, Port Said and Suez. By the end of April Léopoldville was back in Glasgow for a refit in preparation for Operation Overlord. On D-day Léopoldville left Southend-on-Sea for Portsmouth in convoy. On 8 June she unloaded troops at the beaches in Normandy. Between 7 June and 24 December Léopoldville made 24 trips between The Solent and Normandy, transferring 53,217 troops. During the war she transported a total of 124,220 troops.

== Sinking ==
Léopoldville was hastily loaded for the Battle of the Bulge with 2,223 reinforcements from the 262nd and 264th Regiments, 66th Infantry Division of the United States Army. The soldiers' regimental command structure was fragmented by loading troops as they arrived rather than according to their units. A 24-man DEMS detachment manned defensive guns. The ship also carried a crew of 139 (including survivors of the Persier, of which two were women). The Belgian crew, including 93 Africans from the Belgian Congo, received orders in Flemish. Captain Charles Limbor, who assumed command in 1942, spoke no English. There was an insufficient number of life jackets, and few troops participated in the poorly supervised lifeboat drill as Léopoldville sailed from Southampton at 09:00 24 December as part of convoy WEP-3 across the English Channel to Cherbourg. Léopoldville was in a diamond formation with four escorts; the destroyers HMS Brilliant and HMS Anthony, the frigate HMS Hotham, and the French frigate Croix de Lorraine, and another troopship, Cheshire.

Léopoldville was within five miles from the coast of Cherbourg at 17:54 when one of two torpedoes launched by U-486 struck the starboard side aft and exploded in the number 4 hold, killing about three hundred men as compartments E-4, F-4 and G-4 flooded. Few US soldiers understood the abandon ship instructions given in Flemish. While some soldiers joined the crew in departing lifeboats, many did not realize the ship was slowly sinking, and stayed aboard anticipating the ship would be towed ashore by a tug. While the other escorts searched for the U-boat, HMS Brilliant came alongside the sinking ship. Soldiers on Léopoldville jumped down onto the smaller Brilliant. The destroyer could take only five hundred men and headed for the shore leaving some twelve hundred soldiers aboard.

Jack Dixon was a 21-year-old seaman on board HMS Brilliant. He and other crew members battled against the conditions to try and rescue as many of the soldiers as possible. From his website:

H.M.S. Brilliant went along the port side of the troopship we had put our starboard fenders over the side; the sea swell was causing a rise and fall of between 8 ft and 12 ft. The scrambling nets were hanging down the Léopoldville's port side and the US soldiers were coming down on to our upper deck. Some men had started to jump down from a height of approximately 40 feet. Unfortunately limbs were being broken when they landed on the torpedo tubes and other fixed equipment on the starboard side of the upper deck; some men fell between the two vessels and were crushed as the two vessels crashed into each other. To avoid any further injuries, if possible, all our hammocks were brought up from our mess-decks below and laid on the starboard upper deck to cushion the fall of the soldiers as they landed.

While the escorts concentrated on searching for the U-boat and rescuing survivors, they failed to respond to blinking light signals from Cherbourg. Brilliant attempted radio communications, but could not communicate directly with the Americans at Fort L'Ouest in Cherbourg because the Americans used a different radio frequency and could not read the British code. Brilliant contacted HMNB Portsmouth, which telephoned Cherbourg; but shore post communications, decisions, and orders were significantly slowed by the minimal staffing at the base while servicemen and women attended holiday parties.

It took nearly an hour for Cherbourg to realise Léopoldville was sinking. Several hundred Allied vessels in the harbor at Cherbourg might have served as rescue craft, but all had cold engines while many of their crewmen were ashore celebrating the holiday. Allied forces enjoying their Christmas Eve dinner in Cherbourg failed to mobilize a rescue effort before Léopoldville sank by the stern at 20:40. Belated efforts by ships including USS PC-1225 rescued some survivors.

In 1998 the History Channel broadcast the documentary film Cover Up: The Sinking of the SS Léopoldville which included interviews with numerous survivors of the sinking of the ship from the 66th Infantry Division and sailors from the US Navy who attempted to save them by pulling them out of the water. The sailors claimed that they arrived after the sinking of the ship and that most of the men who they pulled out of the water had already frozen to death in the water by the time they arrived on the scene.

Of the 2,235 US servicemen on board, about 515 are presumed to have gone down with the ship. Another 248 died from injuries drowning, or hypothermia. Captain Charles Limbor, one Belgian and three Congolese crew members also went down with the ship. An unknown number of British soldiers died. Documents about the attack remained classified until 1996. The soldiers of the 66th Infantry Division were ordered not to tell anyone about the sinking of the ship and their letters home were censored by the Army during the rest of World War II. After the war, the soldiers were also ordered at discharge not to talk about the sinking of SS Léopoldville to the press and told that their GI benefits as civilians would be canceled if they did so.

== Discovery of the wreck ==
In July 1984, Clive Cussler of NUMA claimed to have discovered the wreck, although French maritime officials claim the location of the shipwreck had always been marked on all maritime charts since its size and location present a potential hazard to navigation. Cussler asserts that the wreck is wrongly located, its true position being about a mile to the south.

In 1997, the 66th Infantry Division Monument was dedicated in Fort Benning, Georgia in memory of the soldiers who died aboard Léopoldville and also to those who survived the attack on Léopoldville but were later killed in action.

In 2005, a memorial was erected in Veterans Memorial Park in Titusville, Florida.

Clive Cussler dedicated his 1986 book Cyclops to the disaster. The dedication reads:

To the eight hundred American men who were lost with the Léopoldville, Christmas Eve 1944 near Cherbourg, France. Forgotten by many, remembered by few.

In 2009, the National Geographic Channel aired a special that recreated the events that led to the sinking and had divers investigating the wreck.

== Memorialization ==
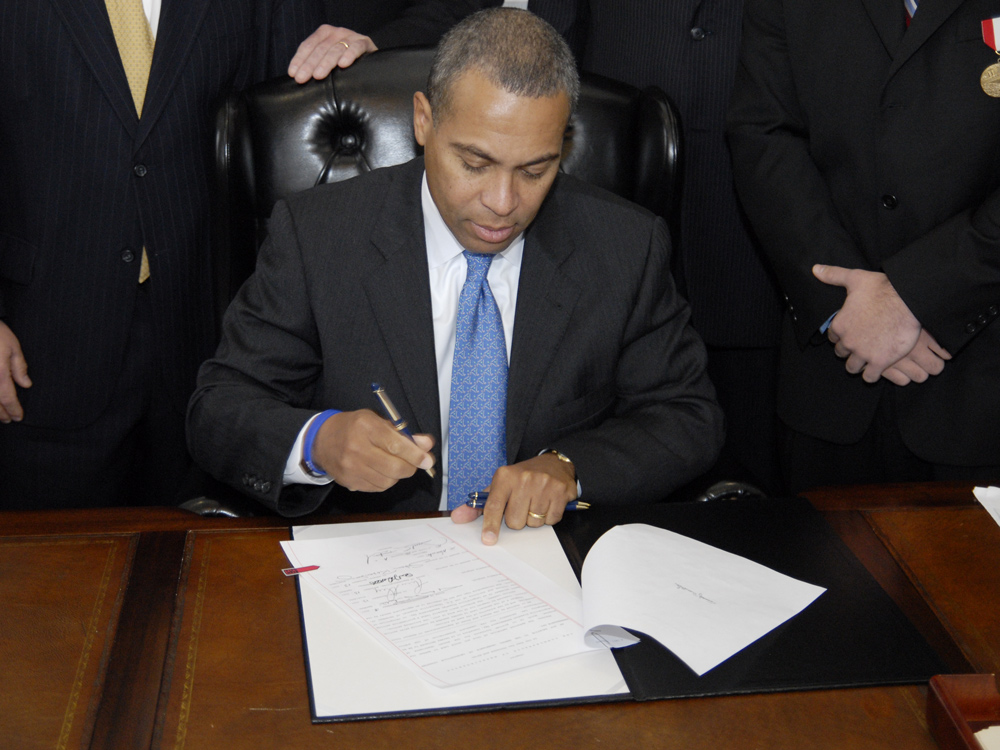
Massachusetts Governor Deval Patrick signing legislation in 2007 to recognize December 24 as an annual day of remembrance in the state of the SS Léopoldville's sinking

There is a memorial for the sinking in Weymouth, Dorset in the United Kingdom.

There is a memorial for the sinking at Fort Moore Main Post Cemetery in the U.S. state of Georgia.

There is a memorial for the sinking at the Lawton Collins Quay in Cherbourg, France, unveiled on May 6th 2025.

On 20 November 2007, legislation was ratified in Massachusetts to name 24 December as an annual day of remembrance of the sinking.

== See also ==
- List by death toll of ships sunk by submarines

== Bibliography ==
- Ambrose, Stephen E (1997). Citizen Soldiers. New York: Simon & Schuster. ISBN 0-684-84801-5.
- Cussler, Clive (1997). The Sea Hunters. London: Pocket Books. ISBN 0-671-51669-8.
- Machielsen, Roger (1991). De Belgische koopvaardij in de tweede wereldoorlog (in Dutch). Veurne: Drukkerij Pattyn. ISBN 90-74023-01-0.

== In popular media ==
The sinking of the SS Léopoldville was discussed in the Heavyweight podcast episode “Deborah,” hosted by Jonathan Goldstein.
