= French frigate L'Escarmouche =

French Naval ship

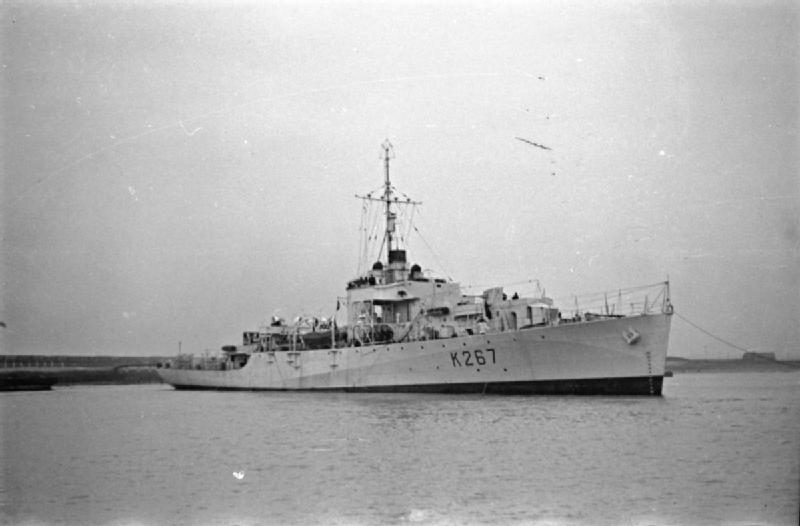
- L'Escarmouche on 15 April 1944

History

United Kingdom
- Name: HMS Frome
- Ordered: 1941
- Builder: Blyth Shipbuilding & Drydock Co.
- Laid down: 19 December 1941
- Launched: 1 June 1943
- Completed: 1943
- In service: 1943-1944
- Out of service: 1944
- Identification: Pennant number: K267
- Fate: Transferred to FNFL in 1944

France
- Name: L'Escarmouche
- Acquired: 1944
- In service: 1944-1960
- Renamed: 1944
- Fate: Decommissioned in 1960

General characteristics
- Class & type: River-class frigate

L'Escarmouche was a River-class frigate in the service of the Free French Naval Forces (FFNL) during World War II. Launched as HMS Frome in 1943, the ship was transferred to the Free French Naval forces and served in the postwar French Navy until her decommissioning in 1960.

== History ==
L'Escarmouche was laid down as HMS Frome in 1942 as a River-class frigate of the Royal Navy. She was launched on 1 June 1943, before being transferred to the FNFL and entering Free French naval service on 3 March 1944. During her service in World War II, L'Escarmouche was primarily occupied with escorting transports and supply ships in the English Channel. In June 1944 she served as an escort for American transports heading for Utah and Omaha Beach on D-Day. L'Escarmouche was escorting the landing ship Empire Javelin when the latter was sunk by either an undersea mine or a submarine-launched torpedo on 28 December 1944. The frigate assisted in rescuing survivors from Empire Javelin, but failed to find an attacker after conducting a sweep for a U-boat. Following the end of the war, L'Escarmouche remained in the service of the newly formed French Fourth Republic. She was decommissioned in 1960.
