= German submarine U-486 =

German World War II submarine

Coordinates: 60°44′N 4°39′E

History

Nazi Germany
- Name: U-486
- Ordered: 5 June 1941
- Builder: Deutsche Werke, Kiel
- Yard number: 321
- Laid down: 8 May 1943
- Launched: 12 February 1944
- Commissioned: 22 March 1944
- Fate: Sunk on 12 April 1945

General characteristics
- Class & type: Type VIIC submarine
- Displacement: 769 tonnes (757 long tons) surfaced; 871 t (857 long tons) submerged
- Length: 67.23 m (220 ft 7 in) o/a; 50.50 m (165 ft 8 in) pressure hull
- Beam: 6.20 m (20 ft 4 in) o/a; 4.70 m (15 ft 5 in) pressure hull
- Height: 9.60 m (31 ft 6 in)
- Draught: 4.74 m (15 ft 7 in)
- Installed power: 2,800–3,200 PS (2,100–2,400 kW; 2,800–3,200 bhp) (diesels); 750 PS (550 kW; 740 shp) (electric)
- Propulsion: 2 shafts; 2 × diesel engines; 2 × electric motors
- Speed: 17.7 knots (32.8 km/h; 20.4 mph) surfaced; 7.6 knots (14.1 km/h; 8.7 mph) submerged
- Range: 8,500 nmi (15,700 km; 9,800 mi) at 10 knots (19 km/h; 12 mph) surfaced; 80 nmi (150 km; 92 mi) at 4 knots (7.4 km/h; 4.6 mph) submerged
- Test depth: 230 m (750 ft); Crush depth: 250–295 m (820–968 ft)
- Complement: 4 officers, 40–56 enlisted
- Armament: 5 × 53.3 cm (21 in) torpedo tubes (four bow, one stern); 14 × torpedoes or 26 TMA mines; 1 × 3.7 cm (1.5 in) Flak M42 AA gun; 2 × twin 2 cm (0.79 in) C/30 anti-aircraft guns

Service record
- Part of: 5th U-boat Flotilla; 22 March – 31 October 1944; 11th U-boat Flotilla; 1 November 1944 – 12 April 1945
- Identification codes: M 50 011
- Commanders: Oblt.z.S. Gerhard Meyer; 22 March – 12 April 1945
- Operations: 2 patrols: 1st patrol: 26 November 1944 – 15 January 1945; 2nd patrol: 9 – 12 April 1945
- Victories: 2 merchant ships sunk (17,651 GRT); 1 warship sunk (1,085 tons); 1 warship total loss (1,085 tons)

German submarine U-486 was a Type VIIC U-boat built for Nazi Germany's Kriegsmarine for service during World War II. She was laid down at the Deutsche Werke in Kiel as yard number 321, launched on 12 February 1944 and commissioned on 22 March with Oberleutnant zur See Gerhard Meyer in command.

The boat began training on 22 March with the 5th U-boat Flotilla but moved on to the 11th flotilla for operations.

She was one of nine Type VIIs that the Kriegsmarine fitted with an experimental synthetic rubber skin of anechoic tiles known as Alberich, which had been designed to counter the Allies' asdic/sonar devices.

Her remains were positively identified in March 2013 after they were found during oil exploration operations off the coast of Norway, not far from the remains of U-864.

== Design ==
German Type VIIC submarines were preceded by the shorter Type VIIB submarines. U-486 had a displacement of 769 tonnes (757 long tons) when at the surface and 871 tonnes (857 long tons) while submerged. She had a total length of 67.10 m (220 ft 2 in), a pressure hull length of 50.50 m (165 ft 8 in), a beam of 6.20 m (20 ft 4 in), a height of 9.60 m (31 ft 6 in), and a draught of 4.74 m (15 ft 7 in). The submarine was powered by two Germaniawerft F46 four-stroke, six-cylinder supercharged diesel engines producing a total of 2,800 to 3,200 metric horsepower (2,060 to 2,350 kW; 2,760 to 3,160 shp) for use while surfaced, two Siemens-Schuckert GU 343/38–8 double-acting electric motors producing a total of 750 metric horsepower (550 kW; 740 shp) for use while submerged. She had two shafts and two 1.23 m (4 ft) propellers. The boat was capable of operating at depths of up to 230 metres (750 ft).

The submarine had a maximum surface speed of 17.7 knots (32.8 km/h; 20.4 mph) and a maximum submerged speed of 7.6 knots (14.1 km/h; 8.7 mph). When submerged, the boat could operate for 80 nautical miles (150 km; 92 mi) at 4 knots (7.4 km/h; 4.6 mph); when surfaced, she could travel 8,500 nautical miles (15,700 km; 9,800 mi) at 10 knots (19 km/h; 12 mph). U-486 was fitted with five 53.3 cm (21 in) torpedo tubes (four fitted at the bow and one at the stern), fourteen torpedoes, one 3.7 cm (1.5 in) Flak M42 and two twin 2 cm (0.79 in) C/30 anti-aircraft guns. The boat had a complement of between forty-four and sixty.

== Service history ==
The submarine moved to Horten Naval Base in Norway between 6 and 9 November 1944 and then Egersund (also in Norway, on the southwest coast, between Stavanger and Kristiansand), arriving there on 20 November.

=== First patrol ===
She departed Egersund on her first patrol on 26 November 1944, taking a circuitous route around the British Isles to the Western Approaches. The U-boat claimed her first victim south of the Eddystone Lighthouse by sinking the Silverlaurel on 18 December. She then attacked the 11,509 GRT Leopoldville on 24 December five miles off the coast of Cherbourg, France. This resulted in the death of over 750 Allied soldiers (819 total deaths). The Leopoldville sank about two hours later. She crippled the US-built but British manned frigate HMS Affleck on the 26th. She also sank HMS Capel, another frigate, on the same day.

She was unsuccessfully attacked by a Canadian Vickers Wellington of 407 Squadron, RCAF on 30 December.

She returned to Norway, this time to Bergen, on 15 January 1945.

=== Second patrol ===
The boat departed Bergen on 9 April 1945, but was sunk by torpedoes from the British submarine HMS Tapir on 12 April.

== Summary of raiding history ==
Date	Ship Name	Nationality	Tonnage (Note: Merchant ship tonnages are in gross register tons. Military vessels are listed by tons displacement.)	Fate
18 December 1944	Silverlaurel	United Kingdom	6,142	Sunk
24 December 1944	Leopoldville	Belgium	11,509	Sunk
26 December 1944	HMS Affleck	Royal Navy	1,085	Total loss
26 December 1944	HMS Capel	Royal Navy	1,085	Sunk

== Discovery of wreck ==
In early 2013, the wreck of U-486 was discovered by the Norwegian petroleum company Statoil at a depth of 250 metres (820 ft), off the coast of Western Norway. The wreck of U-486 is located c. 2 kilometres (1.2 mi) from that of the fellow German submarine U-864.

== See also ==
- German submarine U-480

== Bibliography ==
- Busch, Rainer; Röll, Hans-Joachim (1999). German U-boat commanders of World War II : a biographical dictionary. Translated by Brooks, Geoffrey. London, Annapolis, Md: Greenhill Books, Naval Institute Press. ISBN 1-55750-186-6.
- Busch, Rainer; Röll, Hans-Joachim (1999). Deutsche U-Boot-Verluste von September 1939 bis Mai 1945 [German U-boat losses from September 1939 to May 1945]. Der U-Boot-Krieg (in German). Vol. IV. Hamburg, Berlin, Bonn: Mittler. ISBN 3-8132-0514-2.
- Gröner, Erich; Jung, Dieter; Maass, Martin (1991). U-boats and Mine Warfare Vessels. German Warships 1815–1945. Vol. 2. Translated by Thomas, Keith; Magowan, Rachel. London: Conway Maritime Press. ISBN 0-85177-593-4.
