= HMS Torrington (K577) =

Frigate of the Royal Navy

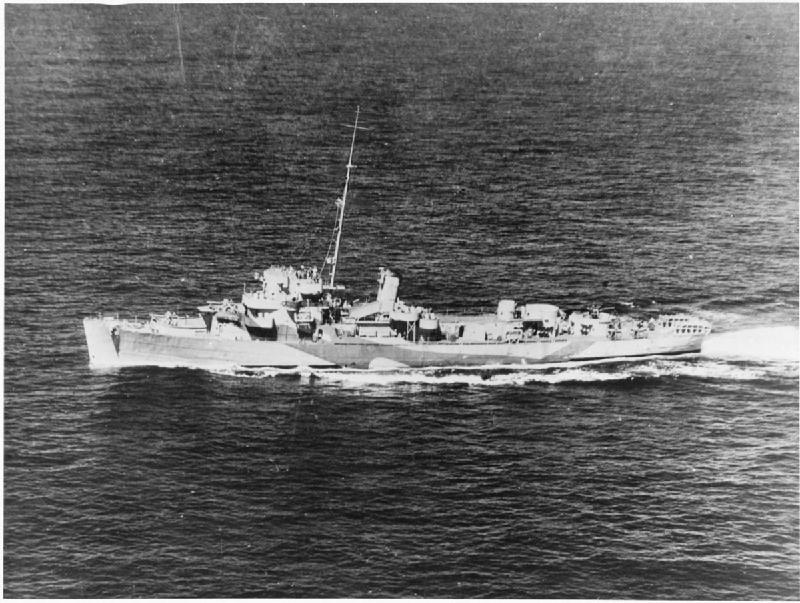
- HMS Torrington off Dunoon, Scotland, in February 1944.

History

United States
- Name: unnamed (DE-568)
- Builder: Bethlehem-Hingham Shipyard, Hingham, Massachusetts
- Laid down: 22 September 1943
- Launched: 27 November 1943
- Completed: 18 January 1944
- Commissioned: never
- Fate: Transferred to United Kingdom 18 January 1944
- Acquired: Returned by United Kingdom 11 June 1946
- Stricken: 15 October 1946
- Fate: Sold 26 September 1947 for scrapping

United Kingdom
- Name: HMS Torrington (K577)
- Namesake: Admiral of the Fleet George Byng, 1st Viscount Torrington (1663–1733), commander of the British fleet at the Battle of Cape Passaro in 1718
- Acquired: 18 January 1944
- Commissioned: 18 January 1944
- Fate: Returned to United States 11 June 1946

General characteristics
- Class & type: Captain-class frigate
- Displacement: 1,400 long tons (1,422 t)
- Length: 306 ft (93 m)
- Beam: 36.75 ft (11.2 m)
- Draught: 9 ft (2.7 m)
- Propulsion: Two Foster-Wheeler Express "D"-type water-tube boilers; GE 13,500 shp (10,070 kW) steam turbines and generators (9,200 kW); Electric motors for 12,000 shp (8,900 kW); Two shafts
- Speed: 24 knots (44 km/h)
- Range: 5,500 nautical miles (10,200 km) at 15 knots (28 km/h)
- Complement: 186
- Sensors & processing systems: SA & SL type radars; Type 144 series Asdic; MF Direction Finding antenna; HF Direction Finding Type FH 4 antenna
- Armament: 3 × 3 in (76 mm) /50 Mk.22 guns; 1 × twin Bofors 40 mm mount Mk.I; 7–16 × 20 mm Oerlikon guns; Mark 10 Hedgehog antisubmarine mortar; Depth charges; QF 2-pounder naval gun
- Notes: Pennant number K562

The fourth HMS Torrington (K577) was a British Captain-class frigate of the Royal Navy in commission during World War II. Originally constructed as a United States Navy Buckley class destroyer escort, she served in the Royal Navy from 1944 to 1946.

== Construction and transfer ==
The ship was laid down as the unnamed U.S. Navy destroyer escort DE-568 by Bethlehem-Hingham Shipyard, Inc., in Hingham, Massachusetts, on 22 September 1943 and launched on 27 November 1943. She was transferred to the United Kingdom upon completion on 18 January 1944.

== Service history ==
The ship was commissioned into service in the Royal Navy as the frigate HMS Torrington (K577) on 18 January 1944 simultaneously with her transfer. After shakedown in Casco Bay, Maine, and off Bermuda, she steamed to St. John's and Naval Station Argentia in the Dominion of Newfoundland before proceeding to England. Arriving there on 20 April 1944, she began patrol and escort duty in the English Channel, North Sea, and North Atlantic Ocean.

On 21 July 1944, Torrington saw her first combat, joining the escort destroyer HMS Melbreak (L73) in action against a German destroyer and four German S-boat – known to the Allies as "E-boat" – motor torpedo boats off Cap d'Antifer, France, preventing them from interfering with the flow of Allied supplies supporting the invasion of Normandy. On 11 March 1945, she sank a German Seehund ("Seal") Type XXVII midget submarine off Ramsgate, England. On 13 March 1945, she sank a second Seehund off Dunkirk, France, in a determined depth charge attack.

The Royal Navy returned Torrington to the U.S. Navy on 11 June 1946.

== Disposal ==
The U.S. Navy struck Torrington from its Naval Vessel Register on 15 October 1946. She was sold on 26 September 1947 for scrapping.
