= HMS Capel (K470) =

Frigate of the Royal Navy

History

United Kingdom
- Name: Capel
- Namesake: Admiral Sir Thomas Bladen Capel
- Builder: Boston Navy Yard
- Laid down: 11 March 1943
- Launched: 22 April 1943
- Commissioned: 16 August 1943
- Fate: Torpedoed and sunk, 26 December 1944

General characteristics
- Type: Captain-class frigate
- Displacement: 1,140 long tons (1,158 t)
- Length: 289 ft 5 in (88.21 m)
- Beam: 35 ft 1 in (10.69 m)
- Draught: 10 ft 6 in (3.20 m)
- Propulsion: 4 × General Motors Model 16-278A diesel engines with electric drive, 6,000 shp (4,474 kW); 2 screws
- Speed: 20 knots (37 km/h; 23 mph)
- Range: 5,000 nmi (9,300 km) at 15 knots (28 km/h; 17 mph)
- Complement: 156
- Armament: 3 × single 3-inch/50 Mk.22 dual purpose guns; 1 × twin 40 mm AA gun; 10 × 20 mm AA guns; 1 × Hedgehog anti-submarine mortar; 4 × K-gun depth charge projectors; 2 × depth charge tracks

HMS Capel was a Captain-class frigate, built in the United States as a Evarts-class destroyer escort, and transferred to the Royal Navy under the terms of Lend-Lease, which served in World War II.

The ship was laid down as USS Wintle (DE-266) on 11 March 1943 by the Boston Navy Yard, Boston, Massachusetts, and launched on 22 April 1943, sponsored by Mrs. Mary Clyde Wintle. On 14 June 1943 the ship was allocated to the United Kingdom; and she was transferred to the Royal Navy and commissioned as HMS Capel on 16 August 1943. The ship was named after Admiral Sir Thomas Bladen Capel (1776–1853).

== Service history ==
Capel was attached to 1st Escort Group based at Belfast from 9 April 1944.

After patrols in the area between the Scottish Isles and the Irish Sea, Capel was anchored in Moelfre Bay, Anglesey to await "D-Day". She sailed on 5 May 1944 to join the massive anti-submarine screen patrolling the western end of the English Channel, in order to protect the Normandy landings of 6 June 1944. Capel returned to Belfast on 18 June to rest.

After the port of Cherbourg was captured and cleared the Capel and her Escort Group escorted convoys across the Channel, to and from Cherbourg with rest periods spent at Plymouth. In late 1944 the group shifted operations to the eastern end of the Channel, patrolling the convoy route to the newly liberated port of Antwerp.

At 14.14 hours on 26 December 1944 Capel and the rest the Escort Group were patrolling 10 nmi (19 km; 12 mi) east-northeast of Cherbourg when the U-486 sighted the group and fired three T5 torpedoes; one of which hit Capel and another Affleck.

Affleck was towed to port, but declared a total loss, while Capel sank at position 49°50′N 1°41′W. The survivors were picked up by American MTBs and taken to Cherbourg. Seventy six of her crew were killed.
