= German submarine U-772 =

German World War II submarine

History

Nazi Germany
- Name: U-772
- Ordered: 21 November 1940
- Builder: Kriegsmarinewerft Wilhelmshaven
- Yard number: 155
- Laid down: 21 September 1942
- Launched: 31 October 1943
- Commissioned: 23 December 1943
- Fate: Sunk on 17 December 1944

General characteristics
- Class & type: Type VIIC submarine
- Displacement: 769 tonnes (757 long tons) surfaced; 871 t (857 long tons) submerged
- Length: 67.10 m (220 ft 2 in) o/a; 50.50 m (165 ft 8 in) pressure hull
- Beam: 6.20 m (20 ft 4 in) o/a; 4.70 m (15 ft 5 in) pressure hull
- Height: 9.60 m (31 ft 6 in)
- Draught: 4.74 m (15 ft 7 in)
- Installed power: 2,800–3,200 PS (2,100–2,400 kW; 2,800–3,200 bhp) (diesels); 750 PS (550 kW; 740 shp) (electric)
- Propulsion: 2 shafts; 2 × diesel engines; 2 × electric motors
- Speed: 17.7 knots (32.8 km/h; 20.4 mph) surfaced; 7.6 knots (14.1 km/h; 8.7 mph) submerged
- Range: 8,500 nmi (15,700 km; 9,800 mi) at 10 knots (19 km/h; 12 mph) surfaced; 80 nmi (150 km; 92 mi) at 4 knots (7.4 km/h; 4.6 mph) submerged
- Test depth: 230 m (750 ft); Crush depth: 250–295 m (820–968 ft)
- Complement: 4 officers, 40–56 enlisted
- Armament: 5 × 53.3 cm (21 in) torpedo tubes (four bow, one stern); 14 × torpedoes; 1 × 8.8 cm (3.46 in) deck gun (220 rounds); 1 × 3.7 cm (1.5 in) Flak M42 AA gun; 2 × twin 2 cm (0.79 in) C/30 anti-aircraft guns

Service record
- Part of: 31st U-boat Flotilla; 23 December 1943 – 31 July 1944; 9th U-boat Flotilla; 1 August – 14 October 1944; 11th U-boat Flotilla; 15 October – 17 December 1944
- Identification codes: M 14 151
- Commanders: Oblt.z.S. / Kptlt. Ewald Rademacher; 23 December 1943 – 17 December 1944
- Operations: 2 patrols: 1st patrol: 13 August – 6 October 1944; 2nd patrol: 19 November – 17 December 1944
- Victories: None

German submarine U-772 was a Type VIIC U-boat of Nazi Germany's Kriegsmarine during World War II.

The U-boat was laid down on 21 September 1942 at the Kriegsmarinewerft Wilhelmshaven (KMW), launched on 31 October 1943, and commissioned on 23 December 1943, commanded by Oberleutnant zur See Ewald Rademacher.

== Design ==
German Type VIIC submarines were preceded by the shorter Type VIIB submarines. U-772 had a displacement of 769 tonnes (757 long tons) when at the surface and 871 tonnes (857 long tons) while submerged. She had a total length of 67.10 m (220 ft 2 in), a pressure hull length of 50.50 m (165 ft 8 in), a beam of 6.20 m (20 ft 4 in), a height of 9.60 m (31 ft 6 in), and a draught of 4.74 m (15 ft 7 in). The submarine was powered by two Germaniawerft F46 four-stroke, six-cylinder supercharged diesel engines producing a total of 2,800 to 3,200 metric horsepower (2,060 to 2,350 kW; 2,760 to 3,160 shp) for use while surfaced, two Garbe, Lahmeyer & Co. RP 137/c double-acting electric motors producing a total of 750 metric horsepower (550 kW; 740 shp) for use while submerged. She had two shafts and two 1.23 m (4 ft) propellers. The boat was capable of operating at depths of up to 230 metres (750 ft).

The submarine had a maximum surface speed of 17.7 knots (32.8 km/h; 20.4 mph) and a maximum submerged speed of 7.6 knots (14.1 km/h; 8.7 mph). When submerged, the boat could operate for 80 nautical miles (150 km; 92 mi) at 4 knots (7.4 km/h; 4.6 mph); when surfaced, she could travel 8,500 nautical miles (15,700 km; 9,800 mi) at 10 knots (19 km/h; 12 mph). U-772 was fitted with five 53.3 cm (21 in) torpedo tubes (four fitted at the bow and one at the stern), fourteen torpedoes, one 8.8 cm (3.46 in) SK C/35 naval gun, (220 rounds), one 3.7 cm (1.5 in) Flak M42 and two twin 2 cm (0.79 in) C/30 anti-aircraft guns. The boat had a complement of between forty-four and sixty.

== War patrols ==
After the usual six-month shakedown and training period in the Baltic, U-772 sailed from Trondheim on 13 August 1944 for her first war patrol, which lasted for 55 days out in the North Atlantic, however she had no success.

She sailed from Trondheim on 19 November 1944 on her second patrol, circling the British Isles. On 17 December 1944 U-772 was sunk by depth charges from the British Colony-class frigate HMS Nyasaland in the North Atlantic, south of Cork, in position 51°16′N 08°05′W with the loss of all 48 hands.

=== Previously recorded fate ===
U-772 was previously thought to have been sunk on 30 December 1944 in the English Channel south of Weymouth at 50°05′N 02°31′W by depth charges from a Canadian Wellington aircraft of RCAF Sqdn. 407/L. This attack was most likely against U-486, which escaped unharmed.

== Bibliography ==
- Busch, Rainer; Röll, Hans-Joachim (1999). German U-boat commanders of World War II : a biographical dictionary. Translated by Brooks, Geoffrey. London, Annapolis, Md: Greenhill Books, Naval Institute Press. ISBN 1-55750-186-6.
- Busch, Rainer; Röll, Hans-Joachim (1999). Der U-Boot-Krieg, 1939-1945: Deutsche U-Boot-Verluste von September 1939 bis Mai 1945 [German U-boat losses from September 1939 to May 1945] (in German). Vol. IV. Hamburg, Berlin, Bonn: Mittler. ISBN 3-8132-0514-2.
- Gröner, Eric; Jung, Dieter; Maass, Martin (1991). German Warships 1815-1945: U-boats and Mine Warfare Vessels. Vol. 2. Translated by Thomas, Keith; Magowan, Rachel. London: Conway Maritime Press. ISBN 0-85177-593-4.
