= Netzekreis =

District of Prussia

- District of Prussia
- 1919–1945
- Netzekreis (in red), formed from parts of the former districts of Czarnikau, Filehne and Kolmar with their former borders (in grey).
- Capital: Schönlanke (Trzcianka)
- History
  - Established: 1919
  - Disestablished: 1945
- Today part of: Poland

The Netzekreis was a district in Germany from 1919 to 1945. For most of its existence, it was part of the Prussian Province of Posen-West Prussia. Its administrative seat was the town of Schönlanke (Trzcianka). Located in the northern part of historic Greater Poland, today the territory of the district is part of the Greater Poland Voivodeship in Poland.

== History ==
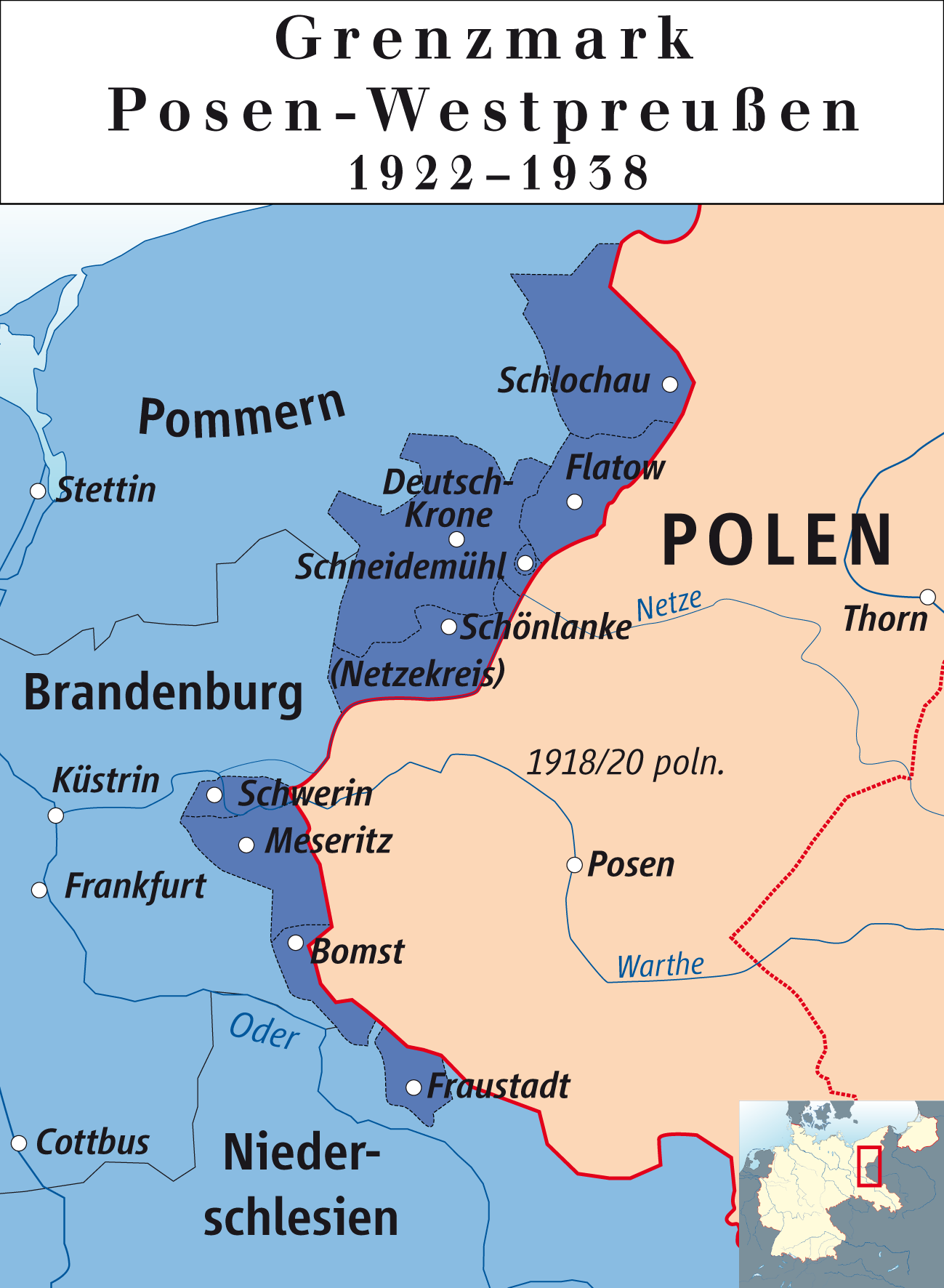
Map of the Province of Posen-West Prussia with the Netzekreis (1922).

In the 18th century, the area of the future Netzekreis belonged to the Netze District, which became part of the Kingdom of Prussia with the First Partition of Poland in 1772. From 1807 to 1815, the area was ceded by Prussia to the Duchy of Warsaw. In 1815, it was restored to Prussia and became part of the Bromberg Region in the Grand Duchy of Posen, which became the Prussian Province of Posen in 1848. It belonged to Germany since 1871. The district was subjected to Germanisation policies.

After the end of World War I and the restoration of independent Poland, large parts of the Province of Posen, as part of historic Greater Poland, i.e. the cradle of the Polish state, were restored by Germany to Poland as a consequence of the Treaty of Versailles, however, small portions in the north remained part of Germany. Since 2 August 1919 the parts of the districts of Czarnikau, Filehne and Kolmar that remained in Germany were jointly administered from Schönlanke (Trzcianka). On 20 November 1919 the area was subordinated to the new administrative region of Frontier March of West Prussia-Posen with its headquarters in Schneidemühl (Piła). The formal merger of the three districts to form the new Netzekreis district took place on 15 December 1919. On 10 January 1920 the Treaty of Versailles came into effect, according to which all areas of the former districts of Czarnikau, Filehne and Kolmar south of the new Germany–Poland border became again part of Poland.

On 11 January 1921 the administrative region of "Frontier March of West Prussia-Posen" was renamed "Frontier March of Posen-West Prussia". On 1 July 1922 the new Province of Posen-West Prussia was formed from the administrative region. The new Schneidemühl region was formed on 1 August 1922, which was congruent to the province. In 1936, the municipality of Lukatz-Kreuz was renamed Kreuz (Ostbahn) (Krzyż Wielkopolski) and was made a town. On 1 October 1938 the Netzekreis was incorporated into the Province of Pomerania after the Province of Posen-West Prussia was dissolved. For reasons of tradition, the Schneidemühl Region was renamed "Frontier March of Posen-West Prussia" Region.

During World War II, the Germans operated a forced labour subcamp of the Stalag II-B prisoner-of-war camp in Ługi Ujskie. On January 28, 1945, the retreating Germans committed a massacre of six Italian generals (Giuseppe Andreoli, Emanuele Balbo Bertone, Ugo Ferrero, Carlo Spatocco, Alberto Trionfi, Alessandro Vaccaneo) at Kuźnica Żelichowska during a German-perpetrated death march of prisoners of war. In the spring of 1945, the district was conquered by the Red Army and then eventually restored to Poland after the war.

== Municipalities ==
At the end of its existence in 1945, the Netzekreis comprised the two towns of Kreuz (Ostbahn) and Schönlanke and 57 other municipalities:

- Ascherbude
- Behle
- Buchwerder
- Corda
- Czarnikau
- Dragefeld
- Ehrbardorf
- Eichberg
- Filehne
- Fissahn
- Floth
- Follstein
- Fratzig
- Glashütte
- Gornitz
- Groß Drensen
- Groß Kotten
- Groß Lubs
- Grünfier
- Hammer
- Hansfelde
- Hüttchen
- Ivenbusch
- Karlshorst
- Karolina
- Kienwerder
- Klein Drensen
- Klein Lubs
- Kottenhammer
- Kreuz (Ostbahn), town
- Küddowtal
- Lemnitz
- Ludwigsdorf
- Marienbusch
- Mariendorf
- Minettenruh
- Mischke
- Neu Behle
- Neudorf
- Neuhöfen
- Niekosken
- Putzig
- Putzighauland
- Radolin
- Radosiew
- Runau
- Schönlanke, town
- Selchow
- Selchowhammer
- Sophienberg
- Stieglitz
- Stöwen
- Straduhn
- Theerofen
- Theresia
- Usch
- Usch Hauland
- Wiesental
- Zaskerhütte

Due to the establishment of the Polish-German border along the Noteć river in 1920, only the parts of the three towns of Czarnikau (Czarnków), Filehne (Wieleń) and Usch (Ujście) which lay north of the Noteć remained in Germany. These areas continued to exist in the Netzekreis as the municipalities of Deutsch Czarnikau, Deutsch Filehne and Deutsch Usch. In 1937, the prefix “Deutsch” was dropped in these three municipalities.
