= January 1945 =

Month of 1945

<<	January 1945					>>
Su	Mo	Tu	We	Th	Fr	Sa
	1	2	3	4	5	6
7	8	9	10	11	12	13
14	15	16	17	18	19	20
21	22	23	24	25	26	27
28	29	30	31

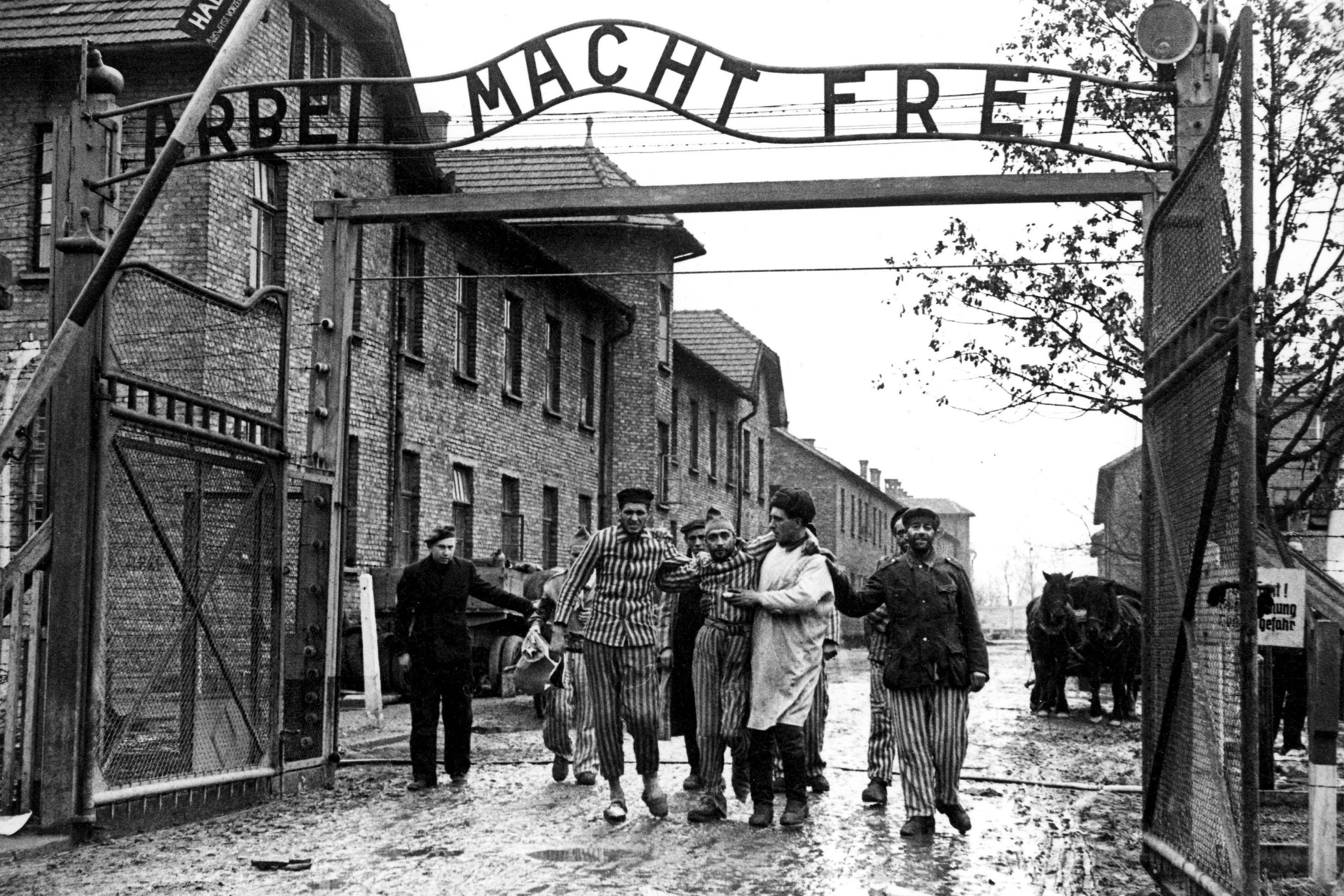
January 27, 1945: Auschwitz concentration camp is liberated by the Soviet Red Army.

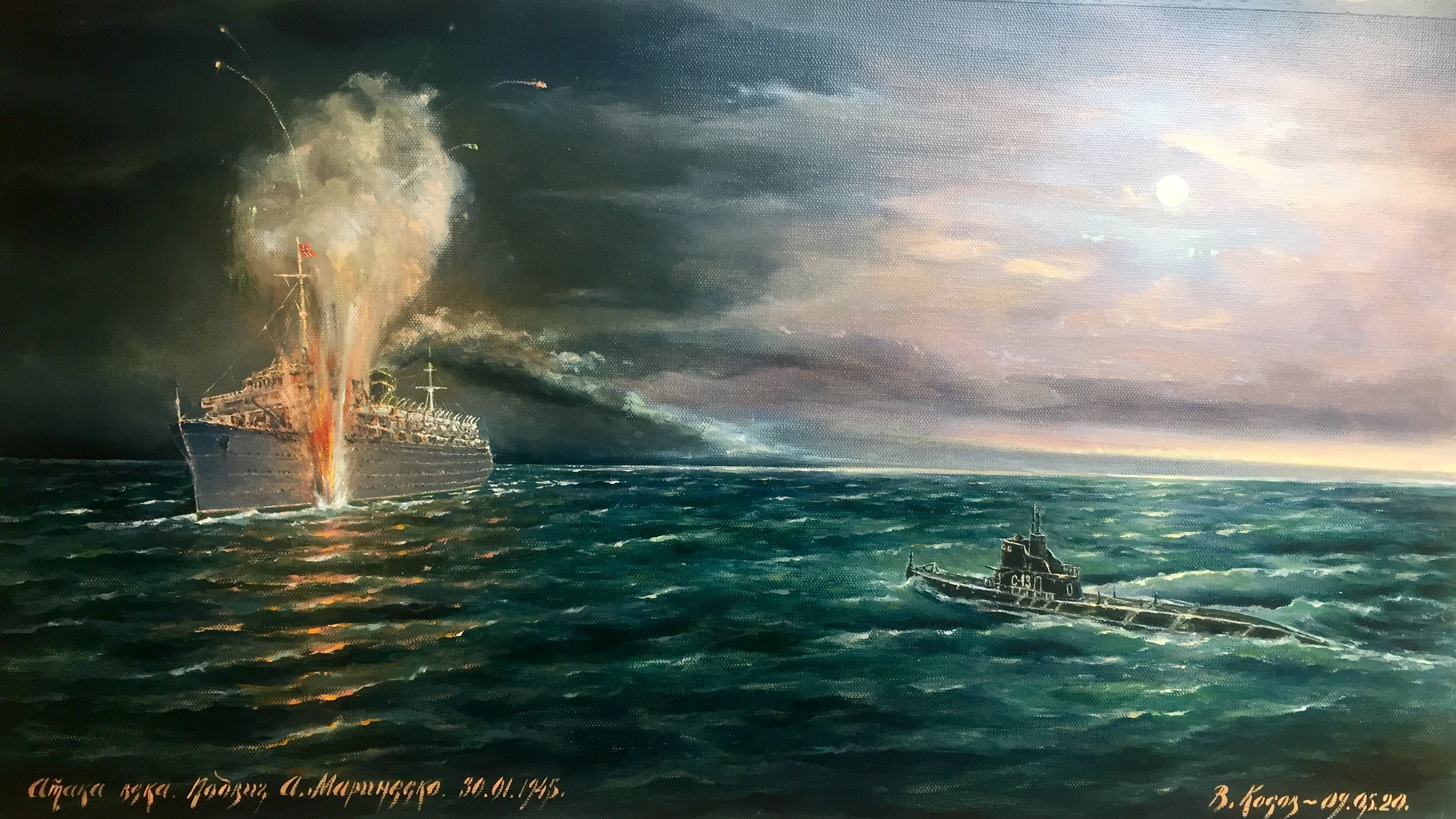
January 30, 1945: More than 9,400 Germans on the German steamer Wilhelm Gustloff are killed when the vessel is torpedoed and sunk by a Soviet submarine during civilian evacuation.

The following events occurred in January 1945:

== January 1, 1945 (Monday) ==
- The Luftwaffe executed Operation Bodenplatte, an attempt to cripple Allied air forces in the Low Countries. The operation was a tactical German success but failed in its aim of achieving air superiority.
- Chenogne massacre: American soldiers retaliated for the Malmedy massacre by killing German prisoners of war near the village of Chenogne, Belgium.
- Britain refused to recognize the Polish Committee of National Liberation.
- German radio broadcast a New Year's Day address by Adolf Hitler. The 26-minute speech offered no information on the battlefield situation or any hint that the war was nearing its end, only a declaration that the war would continue until victory was won. The foreign media speculated as to whether the speech was live or pre-recorded, and even whether it was Hitler's voice at all.

== January 2, 1945 (Tuesday) ==
- RAF bombers conducted heavy raids on Nuremberg and Ludwigshafen; in both cities over 2,300 tons of bombs were dropped. Some ninety percent of Nuremberg's old medieval town center was destroyed.
- Philippines Campaign: A U.S. bombardment fleet bound for invasion beached on Luzon left Leyte with a force including six battleships, twelve escort carriers and thirty-nine destroyers.
- Died: Bertram Ramsay, 61, British admiral (plane crash near Paris)

== January 3, 1945 (Wednesday) ==
- In the Philippines, the Invasion of Lingayen Gulf commenced with a six-day Allied naval bombardment, which was countered with intense kamikaze attacks.
- The Battle of Bure began as part of the Battle of the Bulge.
- British forces made landings on the Burmese island of Akyab with little resistance from the Japanese.
- General Nikolaos Plastiras became Prime Minister of Greece.
- Born: Stephen Stills, rock musician, in Dallas, Texas
- Died: Edgar Cayce, 67, American mystic

== January 4, 1945 (Thursday) ==
- The American escort carrier USS Ommaney Bay was severely damaged in the Sulu Sea by a Japanese kamikaze attack. The ship was abandoned and then scuttled by a torpedo from the destroyer USS Burns.
- Allied forces captured the Burmese island of Akyab.
- Geoffrey Fisher was appointed the new Archbishop of Canterbury to succeed the late William Temple.
- Born: Richard R. Schrock, chemist and Nobel laureate, in Berne, Indiana

== January 5, 1945 (Friday) ==
- The Battle of Bure ended in Allied victory.
- The first mission of Operation Cornflakes was carried out, when a mail train to Linz was bombed and then bags containing false, but properly addressed, propaganda letters were dropped at the site of the wreck so they would be picked up and delivered to Germans by the postal service.
- Died: Ala Gertner, Roza Robota, Regina Safirsztajn and Ester Wajcblum were hanged at Auschwitz concentration camp for their role in the Sonderkommando revolt of 7 October 1944; Julius Leber, 53, German politician (executed by the Nazis at Plötzensee Prison)

== January 6, 1945 (Saturday) ==
- Japanese kamikaze attacks against American ships in the Lingayen Gulf region damaged the battleships USS New Mexico (BB-40) and USS California (BB-44), two cruisers and four destroyers.
- Turkey severed diplomatic relations with Japan.
- British Field Marshal Harold Alexander arrived in Athens as the Dekemvriana clashes continued.
- The British destroyer HMS Walpole (D41) struck a mine in the North Sea and was rendered a constructive total loss.
- U.S. President Franklin D. Roosevelt delivered the State of the Union message. For the first and only time during his presidency, Roosevelt did not deliver the message as a speech before a joint session of Congress. Rather, he delivered it to Congress as a written message and recited a summary of the speech over the radio. The message concluded: "1945 can and must see the substantial beginning of the organization of world peace. This organization must be the fulfillment of the promise for which men have fought and died in this war. It must be the justification of all the sacrifices that have been made-of all the dreadful misery that this world has endured. We Americans of today, together with our Allies, are making history-and I hope it will be better history than ever has been made before. We pray that we may be worthy of the unlimited opportunities that God has given us."

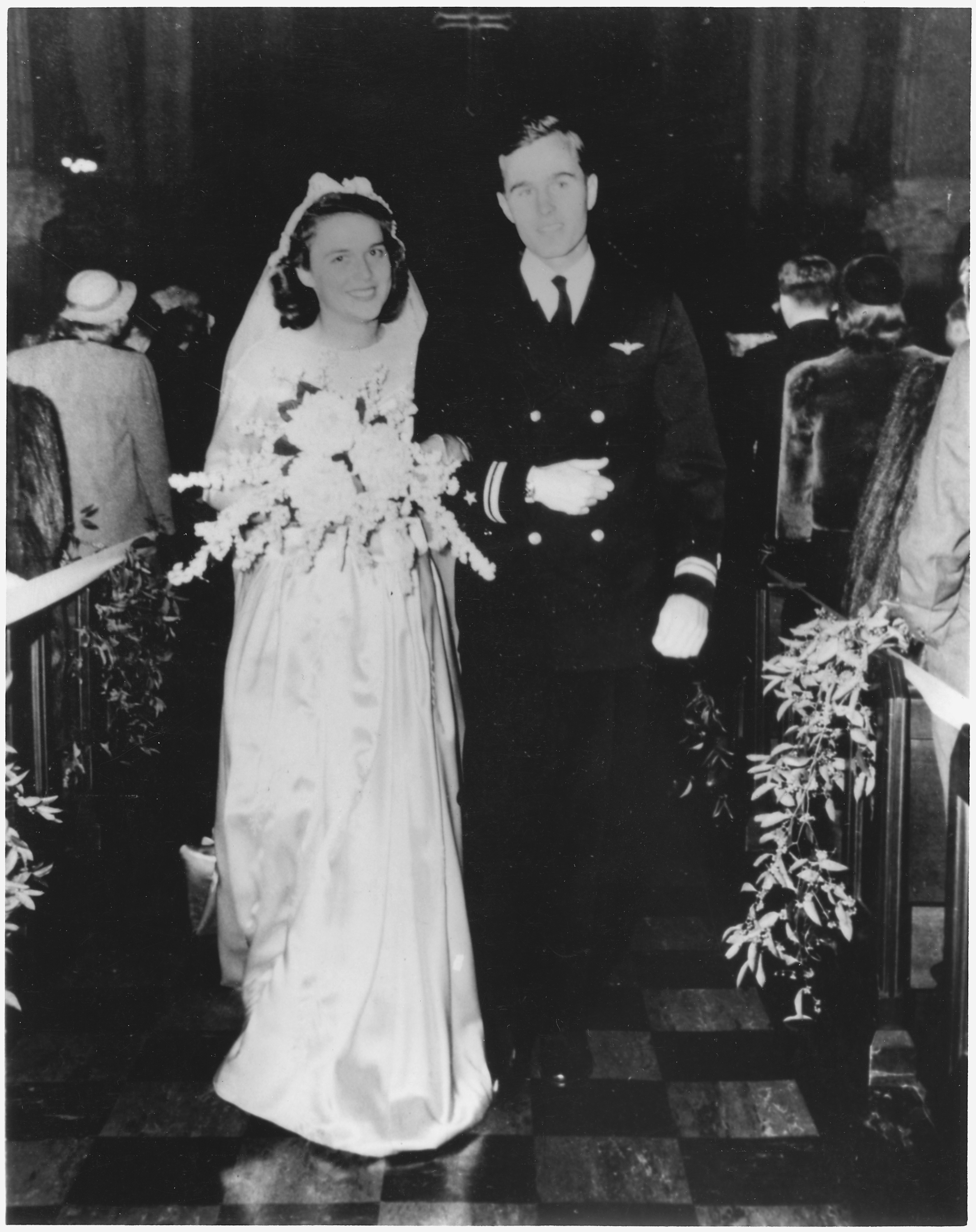
Wedding of Barbara and George H. W. Bush

- Future United States President George H. W. Bush and future First Lady Barbara Bush were married.
- Died: Herbert Lumsden, 47, British lieutenant general (killed by a kamikaze attack on the bridge of the battleship New Mexico during the bombardment of Luzon); Vladimir Vernadsky, 81, Russian/Ukrainian mineralogist and geochemist

== January 7, 1945 (Sunday) ==
- RAF Bomber Command sent 654 aircraft to raid Munich overnight.
- Born:
  - Tony Conigliaro, baseball player, in Revere, Massachusetts (d. 1990)
  - Shulamith Firestone, feminist writer, in Ottawa, Ontario, Canada (d. 2012)
- Died: Theodore E. Chandler, 50, American rear admiral (died from wounds sustained in the Japanese kamikaze attack of the previous day); Thomas McGuire, 24, U.S. Army major and posthumous recipient of the Medal of Honor (killed in action in the Philippines); Curtis F. Shoup, 23, U.S. Army Staff Sergeant and posthumous recipient of the Medal of Honor (killed in action)

== January 8, 1945 (Monday) ==
- Parliamentary elections in Egypt were won by a coalition led by Ahmad Mahir Pasha.
- U.S. Technical Sergeant Russell E. Dunham earned the Medal of Honor near Kaysenberg, France when he single-handedly eliminated three German machine gun nests.

== January 9, 1945 (Tuesday) ==
- The Battle of Bessang Pass began north of Manila.
- The first in a series of American landings at Luzon codenamed Operation Mike was carried out.
- German submarine U-679 was depth charged and sunk in the Baltic Sea by the Soviet guard ship MO-124.
- Died: Dennis O'Neill, 12, Welsh boy whose death at the hands of his foster parents led to reform of the British foster care system; Jüri Uluots, 54, Prime Minister of Estonia

== January 10, 1945 (Wednesday) ==
- The British Fourteenth Army captured Gangaw, Burma.
- Born: Gunther von Hagens, anatomist, in Skalmierzyce, Poland; Jennifer Moss, actress and singer, in Wigan, Lancashire, England (d. 2006); Rod Stewart, singer, in Highgate, North London, England
- Died: Pfc. Alex M. Penkala Jr., Paratrooper assigned to Company E ("Easy Company"), 2nd Battalion, 506th Parachute Infantry Regiment, 101st Airborne Division. He and his comrade Warren H. "Skip" Muck were killed by German artillery fire on the outskirts of the Belgian Luxembourg town of Foy. They were taking cover in a foxhole from the artillery when a direct hit landed on them. He and his comrades had their story told by historian Stephen Ambrose in his 1992 work Band of Brothers.

== January 11, 1945 (Thursday) ==
- The series of events in Athens known as Dekemvriana ended in victory for the British Army and government of Greece.
- The British escort carrier HMS Thane was torpedoed and damaged in the Irish Sea by U-1172 and declared a constructive total loss.
- Born: Christine Kaufmann, actress, author and businesswoman, in Lengdorf, Styria, Austria (d. 2017)

== January 12, 1945 (Friday) ==
- The 1st Ukrainian Front began the Sandomierz–Silesian Offensive.
- The Red Army began the Vistula–Oder Offensive.
- U.S. warplanes attacked the Japanese naval base at Cam Ranh Bay and sank 40 ships. They also sank most of the ships in a Japanese convoy from Qui Nhơn, including the cruiser Kashii.
- Died: Eric Bailey GC, 38, New South Wales Police Force sergeant, was shot and killed in the line of duty. Although mortally wounded, Bailey restrained his assailant until assistance arrived. He would posthumously receive the George Cross.

== January 13, 1945 (Saturday) ==
- The Mikawa earthquake killed over 2,000 people in Japan.
- The Red Army began the East Prussian Offensive.
- Operation Woodlark: Members of Norwegian Independent Company 1 blew up a railway bridge in Snåsa Municipality, Norway. A military troop train unaware of the sabotage derailed and crashed into the river below, killing 70 to 80 people. It remains the most deadly railway accident in the history of Norway.
- Adolf Galland was relieved of his command in the Luftwaffe for his role in the Fighter Pilots' Revolt, which protested against the incompetence of the German High Command in squandering limited resources on missions like Operation Bodenplatte.
- Died: Wilhelm Franken, 30, and Siegfried Lüdden, 28, German U-boat commanders, were killed in a fire aboard the accommodation ship Daressalem in Kiel harbour

== January 14, 1945 (Sunday) ==
- The Battle of Ramree Island began off Burma.
- The British Second Army began Operation Blackcock with the objective of clearing German troops from the Roer triangle formed by the Dutch towns of Roermond and Sittard and the German town of Heinsberg.
- A Heinkel He 111 of the Luftwaffe carried out the last air launching of a V-1 flying bomb, which landed in Yorkshire.
- Adolf Hitler granted Gerd von Rundstedt permission to carry out a fairly drastic retreat in the Ardennes region. Houffalize and the Bastogne front would be abandoned.
- Battle of Foy, part of the Battle of the Bulge ended in American victory.
- The Twin Star Rocket passenger train was introduced in the United States.
- Born: Einar Hákonarson, painter, in Reykjavík, Iceland

== January 15, 1945 (Monday) ==
- In Poland, the 1st Ukrainian Front took Kielce while the 2nd Belorussian Front crossed the Pilica in Poland and attacked toward Radom, Łódź and Posen.
- British escort carrier HMS Thane was torpedoed in the Irish Sea by German submarine U-1172 and rendered a constructive total loss.
- Adolf Hitler held a last meeting with Rundstedt and Walter Model at the Adlerhorst, instructing them to hold the Western Allies at bay for as long as possible. He then boarded a train, never to visit the Western Front again.
- Born: Vince Foster, Deputy White House Counsel, in Hope, Arkansas (d. 1993); Princess Michael of Kent (Marie Christine Anna Agnes Hedwig Ida), in Carlsbad, Sudetenland

== January 16, 1945 (Tuesday) ==
- Hitler returned to Berlin, where he would spend much of the remainder of his life in the Reich Chancellery and Führerbunker.
- The Soviet 1st Belorussian Front captured Radom in Poland.
- German submarine U-248 was depth charged and sunk by U.S. destroyer escorts north of the Azores.

== January 17, 1945 (Wednesday) ==
- The Soviet 1st Belorussian Front captured Warsaw.
- Angry at the abandonment of Fortress Warsaw, Hitler sacked generals Smilo Freiherr von Lüttwitz and Walter Fries.
- The Battle of Tsimba Ridge began between Australian and Japanese forces in the northern sector of Bougainville Island.
- Swedish architect, businessman, diplomat and humanitarian Raoul Wallenberg disappeared after being detained by Soviet authorities during the Siege of Budapest to answer charges of being engaged in espionage. Wallenberg is presumed to have died in a Moscow prison cell on July 17, 1947, although conflicting accounts exist.
- The German freight ship SS Donau was sunk by Norwegian resistance fighters in the Oslofjord

== January 18, 1945 (Thursday) ==
- The Soviet-controlled Polish Committee of National Liberation moved from Lublin to Warsaw.
- The Germans ordered the evacuation of the remaining 58,000 inmates, mostly Jews, of Auschwitz concentration camp ahead of the advancing Soviets. Some were deported by rail while others were forced by the SS to march in freezing temperatures; as many as 15,000 died. The 7,000 too sick to move were left without supplies being distributed.
- At the branch-line terminus of Saint-Valery-en-Caux in Allied-occupied France, a 45-car train full of U.S. troops ran away and crashed through the buffer stop. 89 were killed and 152 injured.

== January 19, 1945 (Friday) ==
- The 1st Ukrainian Front captured Łódź and Kraków while the 2nd Belorussian Front took Mława and Włocławek and the 1st Baltic Front captured Tilsit.
- With German troops mostly driven out of Poland, Home Army commander Leopold Okulicki ordered his forces to disband.
- Martin Bormann and Eva Braun arrived at the Führerbunker.
- The British submarine HMS Porpoise was sunk off Penang, Malaya by Japanese aircraft.
- Died: Petar Bojović, 86, Serbian military commander (Pneumonia); Gustave Mesny, 58, French Army general (executed by the Nazis)

== January 20, 1945 (Saturday) ==
- The fourth inauguration of Franklin D. Roosevelt took place. In what was officially justified as a wartime austerity measure (but also likely done in consideration of the President's increasingly precarious health) the inauguration was a relatively modest ceremony held on South Portico of the White House. In what would turn out to be the final time the then-longstanding tradition was observed, outgoing Vice President Henry A. Wallace administered the oath of office to his successor Harry S. Truman.
- The German evacuation of East Prussia began.
- The 4th Ukrainian Front advancing through Slovakia took Prešov.
- Chinese forces captured Muse, Burma.
- Born: Robert Olen Butler, author, in Granite City, Illinois

== January 21, 1945 (Sunday) ==
- The 3rd Belorussian Front captured Gumbinnen, while the 1st Belorussian Front crossed the Warthen and approached Poznań.
- To prevent their desecration by the Soviets, the Germans began demolishing key structures of the Tannenberg Memorial and disinterred the remains of Paul von Hindenburg and his wife ahead of the Red Army's advance.
- Hitler ordered that every commanding officer from division level upward was required to notify him of all planned movements so he could override them if he saw fit.
- German submarine German submarine U-1199 was depth charged and sunk off the Isles of Scilly by British warships.
- USS Ticonderoga is struck by two Kamikaze.
- Died: Archibald Murray, 84, British Army officer

== January 22, 1945 (Monday) ==
- In Burma, the British IV Corps took Htilin and the Battle of Hill 170 began.
- Four squadrons of RAF Spitfires destroyed a factory in Alblasserdam that manufactured liquid oxygen for German rockets.
- Died: Else Lasker-Schüler, 75, German-Jewish poet

== January 23, 1945 (Tuesday) ==
- The First United States Army captured St. Vith, the last German stronghold in the Ardennes "bulge".
- The 1st Ukrainian Front reached the Oder around Oppeln and Steinau.
- The 20th Indian Division in Burma took Myinmu.
- Died: Helmuth James Graf von Moltke, 37, German jurist (executed for anti-Nazi activities); Newton E. Mason, 94, American admiral

== January 24, 1945 (Wednesday) ==
- The Battle of Poznań began for the German-occupied stronghold city of Poznań in Poland.
- Hitler appointed Heinrich Himmler as commander of the newly created Army Group Vistula, despite Himmler's lack of military expertise.
- Japanese destroyer Shigure was torpedoed and sunk in the Gulf of Siam by American submarine USS Blackfin.

== January 25, 1945 (Thursday) ==
- The Battle of the Bulge ended in Allied victory.
- The Germans blew up and abandoned the Wolf's Lair ahead of the advancing Soviets.
- Born: Leigh Taylor-Young, actress, in Washington, D.C.

== January 26, 1945 (Friday) ==
- The Battle for the Kapelsche Veer began in the Netherlands.
- The battle of the Heiligenbeil Pocket began on the Eastern Front.
- The Przyszowice massacre began in Upper Silesia. Between this day and January 28, soldiers of the Red Army killed between 54 and 69 civilian inhabitants of the Polish village of Przyszowice. The reason for the massacre remains unknown.
- American Lt. Audie Murphy earned the Medal of Honor near Holtzwihr, France, when he saved his company from potential encirclement by climbing onto a burning U.S. tank destroyer and single-handedly killing or wounding 50 Germans with its .50 caliber machine gun until its ammunition was exhausted. Despite taking a leg wound Murphy made his way back to his company and organized a counterattack that forced the Germans to withdraw.
- British frigate HMS Manners was torpedoed and broken in two in the Irish Sea by German submarine U-1051, which was then sunk in turn by depth charges from Royal Navy frigates.
- The war film Objective, Burma! starring Errol Flynn premiered in New York City.
- Born: Jacqueline du Pré, cellist, in Oxford, England (d. 1987)
- Died: Tom Pendergast, 72, American political boss, convicted felon and mentor to the then-newly inaugurated Vice President Truman.

== January 27, 1945 (Saturday) ==
- Auschwitz concentration camp, with its last 7,500 inmates still present, was liberated by Soviet forces.
- Operation Blackcock ended in British victory.
- The Ledo Road linking India to China was finally cleared of Japanese forces when Chinese troops linked up near Mong-Yu.
- German submarine U-1172 was depth charged and sunk in St. George's Channel by British warships.
- Born: Harold Cardinal, Cree writer and political leader, in High Prairie, Alberta, Canada (d. 2005)

== January 28, 1945 (Sunday) ==
- Action of 28 January 1945: An inconclusive naval engagement was fought between two British light cruisers and three German destroyers near Bergen, Norway.
- The Soviet 1st Ukrainian Front captured Katowice and Leszno.
- The Germans committed a massacre of six Italian generals (Giuseppe Andreoli, Emanuele Balbo Bertone, Ugo Ferrero, Carlo Spatocco, Alberto Trionfi, Alessandro Vaccaneo) in Kuźnica Żelichowska during a German-perpetrated death march of prisoners of war.
- Born: Chuck Pyle, country-folk musician, in Pittsburgh, Pennsylvania (d. 2015)
- Died: Roza Shanina, 20, Soviet sniper with 59 confirmed kills (died in East Prussia of a chest wound sustained the previous day from a shell fragment)

== January 29, 1945 (Monday) ==
- Battle of Königsberg: The Soviet 3rd Belorussian Front attacked into the city of Königsberg.
- German submarine U-763 was scuttled in the Schichau-Werke shipyard in Königsberg after taking damage in a Soviet air raid.
- Erich von Manstein was snubbed when he attempted to meet with Hitler.
- Born: Jim Nicholson, politician, in Armagh, Northern Ireland; Tom Selleck, actor, in Detroit, Michigan
- Died: Shlomo Wiesel, father of Elie Wiesel, died at the Buchenwald concentration camp in the course of the Holocaust. The elder Wiesel was suffering from dysentery contracted while he was imprisoned, and was taken to the crematorium after his death.

== January 30, 1945 (Tuesday) ==
- While evacuating German civilians, Nazi officials and military personnel from Gdynia, the German military transport ship Wilhelm Gustloff was torpedoed and sunk by the Soviet submarine S-13. 9,400 people died, making it the largest loss of life in a single ship sinking in history.
- On the twelfth anniversary of the Nazis coming to power, a speech by Adolf Hitler was broadcast wearily appealing once again for the German people to keep up a spirit of resistance. It was the last public speech Hitler ever made.
- The Second Battle of Kesternich began just inside the German border with Belgium.
- U.S. and Filipino forces conducted the Raid at Cabanatuan and liberated more than 552 Allied prisoners of war from a camp near Cabanatuan.
- Prince Henry, Duke of Gloucester became Governor-General of Australia.
- In Italy, the Ivanoe Bonomi government issued a decree granting women the right to vote. The Mussolini regime had granted women the right to vote in 1925, but only at local levels.
- President Roosevelt and British Prime Minister Winston Churchill met at Malta for discussions preparatory to next week's Yalta Conference.
- The German historical film Kolberg premiered in Berlin. The film, telling the story of the Prussian city of Kolberg successfully holding out against a siege by the French during the Napoleonic Wars, was intended as Nazi propaganda to encourage the German population to continue the fight against the Allies.
- Born: Michael Dorris, novelist and scholar, in Louisville, Kentucky (d. 1997)
- Died: William Goodenough, 77, British admiral

== January 31, 1945 (Wednesday) ==
- The Battle for the Kapelsche Veer ended in Allied victory.
- The Battle of Hill 170 ended in British Indian victory.
- Podgaje massacre: The German Waffen-SS carried out a massacre of some 160–210 Polish POWs in the village of Podgaje (see German atrocities committed against Polish prisoners of war).
- Born: Joseph Kosuth, conceptual artist, in Toledo, Ohio
- Died: Eddie Slovik, 24, U.S. Army private (shot by firing squad after being sentenced to death upon being convicted by court-martial of desertion, and the only American soldier to be executed for that offence since the American Civil War)
