= Oflag 64 =

World War II German prisoner-of-war camp

- Szubin, Poland
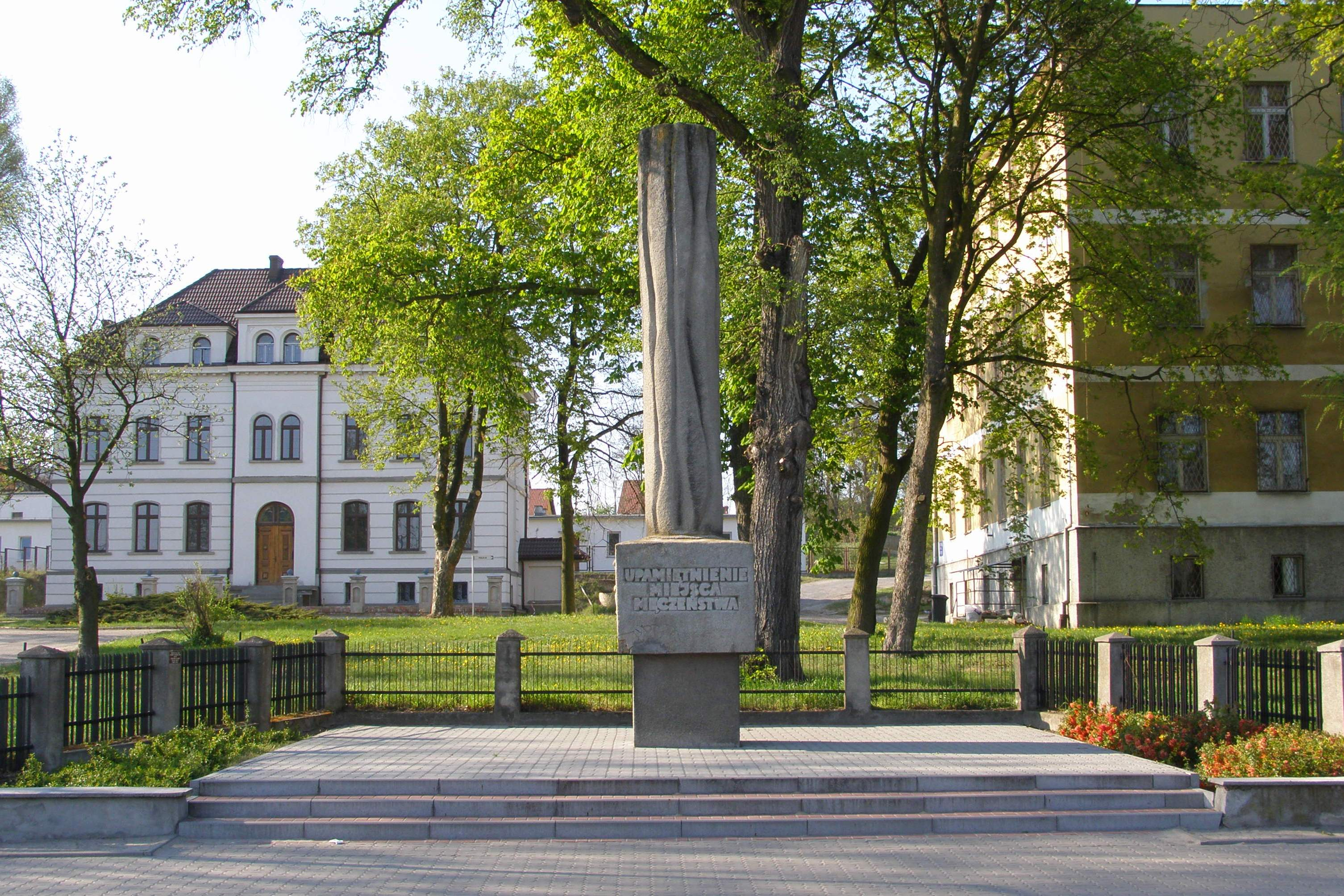
- Monument in Szubin

Site information
- Type: Prisoner-of-war camp
- Controlled by: Nazi Germany

Location
- Szubin, Poland (post-war borders)
- Coordinates: 53.0052°N 17.7245°E

Site history
- In use: 1943-1945

Garrison information
- Occupants: U.S. Army officers

Oflag 64 was a World War II German prisoner-of-war camp for officers located at Szubin a few miles south of Bydgoszcz, in Pomorze, Poland, which at that time was occupied by Nazi Germany. It was probably the only German POW camp set up exclusively for U.S. Army ground component officers. At most other camps there were several nationalities, although they were usually separated into national compounds.

The camp was built around a Polish boys' school by adding barracks. Initially it was Stalag XXI-B for Polish soldiers until December 1940. It then it became Oflag XXI-B for French and British Commonwealth officers, subsequently for Soviet officers until June 1943. They were then moved out to other camps, the Commonwealth flying personnel to Stalag Luft III Sagan, others to Oflag XXI-C Ostrzeszów. It was then re-numbered.

== History ==
On 6 June 1943, the camp was redesignated Oflag 64; it became an American officers-only camp with the arrival of officers captured in the North Africa Campaign in Tunisia. In late 1943, an escape committee started digging a tunnel which was to pass under the barbed wire fence, but in March 1944, upon receiving news of the disastrous results of the "Great Escape" from Stalag Luft III the escape committee ordered a shut-down of the operation. In June 1944 senior American officers captured in the Battle of Normandy were sent to Oflag 64.

On 21 January 1945, the roll call counted a total of 1,471 POWs. Because of approaching Soviet troops, all POWs capable of walking were marched out. The senior U.S. officer was Lieutenant Colonel Paul Goode. On January 23, the camp was liberated by the Soviet 61st Army. There were approximately 100 Americans, sick and medical personnel, and a few that had hidden in the old escape tunnel. About 200 escaped from the marching column and returned to the camp.

=== Aftermath ===
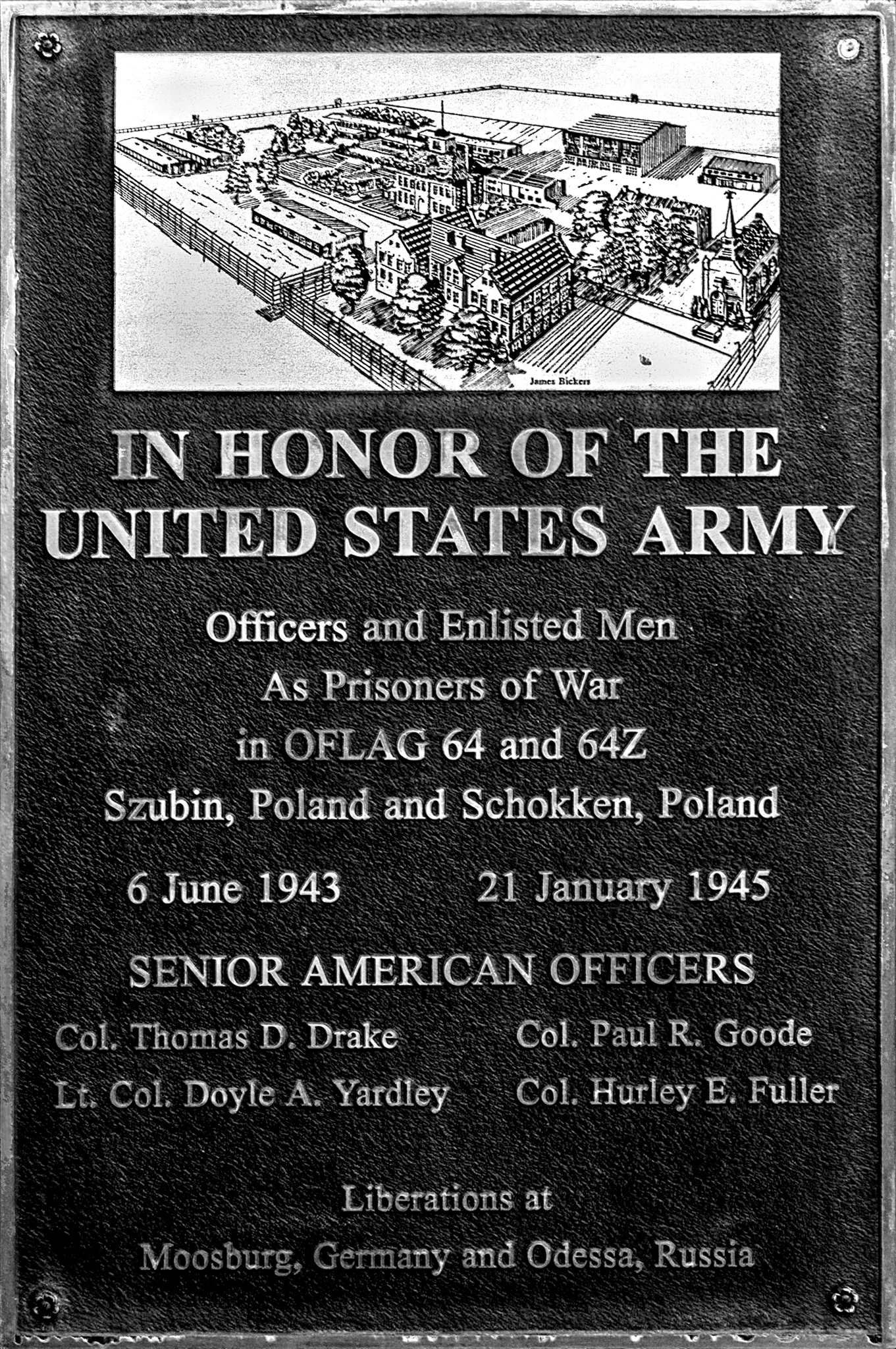
Memorial Plaque at Andersonville NHS

The group that marched out of Szubin, reached Oflag XIII-B at Hammelburg on March 10. They marched through snow and bitter cold most of the nearly 400 miles (640 km). About 400 dropped out on the way, too weak to march, or escaped. A number were shot.

The saga of 1st Lt. J. T. Williams from Garland, Texas, US, was typical of the Oflag 64 POWs who decided to go it alone rather than stay with the column as it headed west. Williams (3rd Bn, 357th Inf, 90th Div) was leading a nine-man patrol to test German defenses on the Mahlman Line on July 6, 1944, near Beaucoudray, France, when they were ambushed. He and a sergeant were the only survivors. He was captured two days later trying to get back to American lines. On 21 January 1945, Williams was one of the POWs who departed Oflag 64. After covering about 80 miles by 29 January, he found a place to hide when the column marched out. He remained in a recently evacuated POW camp for Polish and French officers and dodged German patrols for five days until "recaptured" by Russian troops. Williams may have no longer been a POW but he was not out of danger. The day of his liberation, German artillery shelled the camp killing a number of Polish and Yugoslav ex-POWs that had collected at the camp. On his own, he made his way toward Warsaw over the next 10 days on foot, truck, train and wagon. Depending on handouts of food and clothing from Polish civilians and Russian soldiers, he at one point shared a boxcar with Jewish refugees recently released from nearby death camps. In his diary, he described Warsaw as "...a pitiful sight. Not a soul living here. Absolutely flat." He spent a week outside Warsaw where he was finally able to connect with other Americans including some who had been at Oflag 64. After a week, he was able to board a train for Odessa, Russia, arriving on 1 March, where they were immediately placed under Russian armed guard in a warehouse. Williams departed Odessa a week later on a British freighter after delivering Lend-Lease supplies. After transferring ships in Istanbul, Port Said, Egypt, and Naples, Italy, he arrived in Boston aboard the SS Mariposa, on 8 April 1945.

Lt. Col. Goode marched with them the entire distance. Part of the group, including Goode were again marched out to Stalag VII-A, Moosburg, where they were liberated by units of the U.S. 14th Armored Division on 29 April (three weeks after Hammelburg had been liberated by the same unit).

Those that had stayed at the camp experienced considerable difficulties. The Soviets wanted to hold them hostage, until all Soviet POWs in camps behind Allied lines were returned to them. Finally, under the command of Col. Frederick Drury, they reached Odessa and were evacuated on a New Zealand ship, HMNZS Monowai.

== The Welcome Swede ==
The reason that the camp had many amenities was Swedish attorney Henry Söderberg (d. 1998), who was the YMCA representative to the area who frequently visited the camps (including Stalag Luft III, famous for "The Great Escape") bearing gift items that furnished each camp with a band and orchestra, a well-equipped library, and sports equipment, along with religious items needed by chaplains, causing him to become known as "The Welcome Swede", which became the title of a 1988 book by American journalist J. Frank Diggs (1916-2004), a POW at nearby Oflag64.

== Oflag 64/Z ==
After the Armistice of Cassibile in September 1943, Oflag 64/Z in Schokken became the camp where most Italian general officers captured by German troops during Operation Achse were gathered. By November 1943, the Italian military internee population of Oflag 64/Z included three army generals, twenty-two army corps generals, forty-six division generals, eighty-four brigadier generals, one fleet admiral, four vice admirals, two rear admirals, one air fleet general, two air division generals, three air brigade generals, and a general of the MVSN. Among the most prominent Italian generals held in Oflag 64/Z were Italo Gariboldi (former commander of the Eighth Army), Ezio Rosi (former commander of Army Group East), Carlo Geloso (former commander of Italian occupation forces in Greece), Carlo Vecchiarelli (former commander of the 9th Army), Lorenzo Dalmazzo (former commander of the 11th Army) and Sebastiano Visconti Prasca (notable for having commanded the Italian invasion force in the early stages of the Greco-Italian War).

Considered "traitors" due to their refusal to swear allegiance to the Italian Social Republic, the generals were mistreated and underfed; five of them (Alberto de Agazio, Umberto di Giorgio, Davide Dusmet, Armellini Chiappi and Rodolfo Torresan) died during captivity at the camp, whereas Admirals Inigo Campioni and Luigi Mascherpa were handed over to RSI authorities, tried and executed for having opposed the German takeover in the Dodecanese. About a dozen generals eventually accepted to join the Italian Social Republic and were repatriated, whereas a group of others, who had not formally joined but were seen as more favourable to the German cause, were transferred to Vittel internment camp, where they enjoyed better treatment. Another group, considered as particularly anti-German, was transferred to Stalag XX-A in Toruń, where they received a harsher treatment. Most remained in Schokken till late January 1945, when they were transferred westwards with a forced march through the snow; during the march, six generals (Carlo Spatocco, Alberto Trionfi, Alessandro Vaccaneo, Ugo Ferrero, Emanuele Balbo Bertone, and Giuseppe Andreoli) were shot by the SS for being unable to keep pace with the other prisoners. Another two, Francesco Antonio Arena and Alberto Briganti, managed to escape and hid in a Polish farm, but were found by Soviet soldiers and shot after being mistaken for German collaborators, with Arena dying and Briganti miraculously surviving. The other generals were liberated by the advancing Red Army a few days later and repatriated in the autumn of 1945.

== Media ==
"Oflag 64: A P.O.W. Odyssey" was a TV documentary made by PBS in 2000.

== See also ==
- List of German World War II POW camps
- Oflag
- Oflag XIII-B
- Oflag XXI-B
