= December 1944 =

Month of 1944

<<	December 1944					>>
Su	Mo	Tu	We	Th	Fr	Sa
					1	2
3	4	5	6	7	8	9
10	11	12	13	14	15	16
17	18	19	20	21	22	23
24	25	26	27	28	29	30
31

The following events occurred in December 1944:

== December 1, 1944 (Friday) ==
- The U.S. Ninth Army captured Linnich.
- Les Horvath of Ohio State University was announced as the winner of the Heisman Trophy.
- The Thiaroye massacre happened in French West Africa.
- Born: John Densmore, drummer of the rock band The Doors, in Los Angeles, California

== December 2, 1944 (Saturday) ==
- The U.S. Ninth Army captured the villages of Leiffarth and Roerdorf.
- The Army–Navy Game was played at Baltimore Municipal Stadium, with Army defeating Navy 23-7 before a crowd of 66,659. About 30,000 members of the general public were allowed to attend on the conditions of living within 8.3 miles (13.4 km) of Baltimore and purchasing a $25 war bond. General Douglas MacArthur sent Army head coach Earl Blaik a congratulatory telegram after the game.
- Born: Cathy Lee Crosby, actress, in Kansas City, Missouri; Ibrahim Rugova, 1st president of the Republic of Kosova, in Crnce, Kosovo (d. 2006)
- Died: Josef Lhévinne, 69, Russian pianist; Eiji Sawamura, 27, Japanese baseball player (killed in action near Yakushima when his ship was torpedoed and sunk)

== December 3, 1944 (Sunday) ==
- A series of clashes in Athens known as the Dekemvriana ("December events") began when British troops and Greek police opened fire on a massive leftist demonstration, killing 28 and wounding 100.
- The Soviet 2nd Ukrainian Front captured the Hungarian city of Miskolc.
- The American destroyer USS Cooper was torpedoed and sunk in Ormoc Bay by the Japanese destroyer Take.
- The British Home Guard formally stood down.

== December 4, 1944 (Monday) ==
- The Allies firebombed the German city of Heilbronn, killing 7,147 people.
- Dutch famine of 1944: German occupation authorities in the Netherlands cut the bread ration to two pounds per person per week.
- The Japanese destroyer Kishinami was torpedoed and sunk in the South China Sea west of Palawan by the American submarine Flasher.
- Born: Dennis Wilson, drummer, singer, songwriter and member of The Beach Boys, in Inglewood, California (d. 1983)
- Died: Roger Bresnahan, 65, American baseball player and manager

== December 5, 1944 (Tuesday) ==
- The 3rd Ukrainian Front of the Soviet Army captured Szigetvár and Vukovar.
- British forces in Greece shelled communist positions near Piraeus.
- The American Liberty ship Antoine Saugrain was torpedoed in Leyte Gulf by Japanese aircraft and sank the next day.
- Born: Jeroen Krabbé, actor and director, in Amsterdam, Netherlands

== December 6, 1944 (Wednesday) ==
- In Britain the official process of returning evacuees began in regions unaffected by the V-weapon attacks.
- 409 Japanese paratroopers were landed at Leyte in a coordinated offensive with Japanese infantry attacking from the west.
- The Germans began removing all the electric trains in the Netherlands along with their wiring and sending them to Germany to replace the train system in places where it had been destroyed by Allied bombing.
- German submarine U-297 was depth charged and sunk west of Yesnaby by a Short Sunderland patrol bomber of No. 201 Squadron RAF.
- The British frigate Bullen was torpedoed and sunk off Cape Wrath, Scotland by German submarine U-775.
- British planes began strafing communists in Athens.
- The Heinkel He 162 had its first flight.
- Born: Ron Kenoly, Christian musician and worship leader, in Coffeyville, Kansas (d. 2026); Jonathan King, musician, record producer and entrepreneur, in London, England

== December 7, 1944 (Thursday) ==
- The Tōnankai earthquake in Japan caused 1,223 casualties.
- Nicolae Rădescu became Prime Minister of Romania, the last to hold the post prior to communist rule.
- U.S. forces in Leyte counterattacked and halted the Japanese offensive.
- The American destroyer Mahan was damaged in the Camotes Sea by a Japanese kamikaze aircraft and consequently scuttled.
- The American destroyer Ward was hit by a Japanese kamikaze aircraft in Ormoc Bay and abandoned.
- The Chicago Convention on International Civil Aviation established the International Civil Aviation Organization, a specialized agency to coordinate and regulate international air travel.
- The Arab Women's Congress of 1944 took place in Cairo, Egypt, leading to the establishment of the Arab Feminist Union.
- The US 100th Infantry Division, took heavy losses after two days of fighting (7th and 8th) in Lemberg, France.
- Born: Daniel Chorzempa, organist and architect, in Minneapolis, Minnesota (d. 2023)

== December 8, 1944 (Friday) ==
- German forces withdrew from Jülich.
- Iwo Jima suffered the heaviest U.S. air raid of the Pacific War.
- Born: Sharmila Tagore, Indian film actress, in Hyderabad

== December 9, 1944 (Saturday) ==
- German submarine U-862 shelled the Greek tanker SS Illios off the southern South Australian coast.
- The American submarines Plaice, Redfish and Sea Devil torpedoed and damaged the Japanese aircraft carrier Jun'yō in the Strait of Formosa. Jun'yō was withdrawn from service and scrapped after the war.
- The Royal Navy corvette Bamborough Castle depth-charged and sank the German submarine U-387 in the Barents Sea.
- The month-long Battle of Knin ended in victory for the Yugoslav Partisans.
- A meeting was held at the Langley Aeronautical Laboratory, Langley Air Force Base, Virginia, to discuss the formation of an organization that would devote its efforts to the study of stability and maneuverability of high-speed weapons (guided missiles). This would become the Auxiliary Flight Research Station (AFRS - later known as the Pilotless Aircraft Research Division) on Wallops Island, Virginia. From the outset, work was pointed toward supersonic flight testing.
- Born: Neil Innes, writer, musician and comedian, in Danbury, Essex, England (d. 2019); Tadashi Irie, yakuza, in Uwajima, Ehime, Japan; Ki Longfellow, novelist, playwright and theatrical producer, on Staten Island, New York (d. 2022)
- Died: Laird Cregar, 31, American stage and film actor (heart attack following complications from a crash diet)

== December 10, 1944 (Sunday) ==
- France and the Soviet Union signed a 20-year Treaty of Alliance and Mutual Assistance.
- The American Liberty ship William S. Ladd was sunk at Leyte by a Japanese kamikaze attack.
- The Yugoslav merchant steamship Cetinje, operating on the route Kotor–Prčanj–Donji Stoliv–Perast–Risan–Kamenari–Tivat–Đenovići–Herceg Novi, and carrying around 250 people, including civilians, Yugoslav Partisans, German POWs, and 15 members of the Garibaldi Division, struck a magnetic mine in the middle of the Bay of Tivat at 08:50 local time and sank; only ten people survived: the captain Božo Paparela, two crew members, and seven passengers.
- Nobel Prizes were awarded for the first time since 1939. Since the customary ceremonies still could not be held in Stockholm because of the war, a special luncheon was held under the auspices of The American-Scandinavian Foundation at the Waldorf Astoria hotel in New York City. The Award in Physics went to Isidor Isaac Rabi (United States), Chemistry to Otto Hahn (Germany), Physiology or Medicine to Joseph Erlanger and Herbert Spencer Gasser (United States), Literature to Johannes V. Jensen (Denmark) and the Peace Prize to the International Committee of the Red Cross. Three retroactive recipients for 1943 were also named, in accordance with the Nobel Foundation's statutes allowing the awards to be reserved for one year. They were Otto Stern of the United States for Physics, George de Hevesy (Germany) for Chemistry and Carl Peter Henrik Dam (Denmark) and Edward Adelbert Doisy (United States) for Physiology or Medicine.
- Kenesaw Mountain Landis was elected to the Baseball Hall of Fame two weeks after his death.

== December 11, 1944 (Monday) ==
- The British Eighth Army in Italy crossed the Lamone.
- The American destroyer USS Reid was sunk off Leyte by a Japanese kamikaze aircraft.
- German authorities carried out the last gassing of inmates at the Hartheim Euthanasia Centre.
- Born: Brenda Lee, singer, in Atlanta, Georgia; Lynda Day George, actress, in San Marcos, Texas

== December 12, 1944 (Tuesday) ==
- The U.S. Third Army captured the V-rocket factory at Wittring in eastern France.
- British General Harold Alexander was promoted to field marshal and made Supreme Commander of Allied Force Headquarters in the Mediterranean.
- German submarine U-416 collided with the German minesweeper M 203 and sank northwest of Pillau.
- German submarine U-196 was listed as missing in the Sunda Strait. The submarine's fate remains unknown.
- German destroyers Z35 and Z36 were both sunk by naval mines in the Gulf of Finland.
- Japanese destroyer Yūzuki was sunk northeast of Cebu by American aircraft.
- Japanese destroyer Uzuki was torpedoed and sunk in Ormoc Bay by American motor torpedo boats.
- Born: Kenneth Cranham, actor, in Dunfermline, Scotland; Cara Duff-MacCormick, actress, in Woodstock, Ontario, Canada

== December 13, 1944 (Wednesday) ==
- The Battle of Metz ended in American victory.
- The First Battle of Kesternich began just inside the German border with Belgium.
- The Battle of Mindoro began in the central Philippines.
- German submarine U-365 was depth charged and sunk in the Arctic Ocean by Fairey Swordfish aircraft of 813 Naval Air Squadron.
- Japanese cruiser Myōkō was torpedoed in the Java Sea by the American submarine Bergall and damaged beyond repair.
- American cruiser Nashville was severely damaged off Negros Island by a kamikaze attack and required four months of repairs.
- Died: Wassily Kandinsky, 77, Russian painter and art theorist; Lupe Vélez, 36, Mexican-born American vedette and actress

== December 14, 1944 (Thursday) ==
- The British escort destroyer Aldenham was sunk by a naval mine in the Adriatic Sea off Pag. Aldenham was the last Royal Navy destroyer lost in World War II.
- The Palawan massacre occurred in the Philippines when 150 Allied prisoners of war were murdered by the Japanese during an air raid.
- At least 186 Japanese aircraft were deployed for an all-out attack on the American invasion force sailing toward Mindoro. Most of them failed to locate the American convoys and at least 46 were shot down.
- The United States Congress authorized the creation of the five-star rank in the U.S. military.
- A total prohibition on citizen use of electricity was introduced to North and South Holland.
- The sports film National Velvet starring Mickey Rooney, Donald Crisp and Elizabeth Taylor was released.

== December 15, 1944 (Friday) ==
- The U.S. Seventh Army captured Riedseltz, Salmbach and Lauterbourg in eastern France.
- During the Battle of Mindoro, the Sixth United States Army landed on Mindoro itself. The Japanese offered weak opposition on the ground but continued to respond strongly in the air, sending a wave of kamikazes to the battle zone that managed to destroy a pair of LSTs.
- William D. Leahy was made a five-star admiral in the U.S. Navy.
- The all-star musical romantic comedy film Hollywood Canteen was released. The Andrews Sisters, Jack Benny, Eddie Cantor, Joan Crawford, Jimmy Dorsey and Roy Rogers were among the many celebrities to make cameos in the film.
- The Universal horror film House of Frankenstein starring Boris Karloff and Lon Chaney Jr. was released.
- Died: Glenn Miller, 40, American bandleader (presumed, after the plane carrying Miller to Paris to play for the soldiers there went missing in bad weather over the English Channel and was never found)

== December 16, 1944 (Saturday) ==
- The First Battle of Kesternich and Operation Queen ended in German defensive victory.
- The Battle of the Bulge and the accompanying Battle of St. Vith began.
- The Battle of Lanzerath Ridge began between U.S. and German forces in Belgium.
- The Battle of Mindoro ended in victory for the U.S. and Filipino Commonwealth forces.
- Cinema Rex bombing: A V-2 rocket (fired by SS Werfer Battery 500 from Hellendoorn in the Netherlands) landed directly on a cinema in Antwerp (Allied-occupied Belgium) which was showing The Plainsman, killing 567 people including 296 U.S. servicemen and up to 74 children, the single highest death total from a single rocket attack during the war.
- George Marshall was made a five-star general in the U.S. Army.
- Benito Mussolini gave a speech at the Teatro Lirico in Milan that would be his last. Although he maintained that new German weapons would turn the tide of the war, it was clearly a political last will and testament as he tried to defend himself in the eyes of history and presented a dark picture of a Bolshevik Europe in the event of Allied victory.

== December 17, 1944 (Sunday) ==
- The Battle of Lanzerath Ridge ended in German victory.
- Malmedy massacre: 84 American prisoners of war were murdered by their German captors in Malmedy, Belgium.
- Wereth massacre: 11 African-American prisoners of war were murdered by German troops of the 1st SS Panzer Division near the Belgian hamlet of Wereth.
- Allied troops in Italy entered Faenza, the closest they would get to Bologna before the beginning of winter. A little further north, the 10th Indian Division crossed the Senio River.
- The U.S. military began preparations for deploying nuclear weapons by activating the 509th Composite Group.
- Ernest King was made a five-star admiral in the U.S. Navy.
- German submarine U-772 was depth charged and sunk south of Cork, Ireland by Royal Navy frigate Nyasaland.
- The Green Bay Packers defeated the New York Giants 14–7 in the NFL Championship Game at the Polo Grounds in New York City.
- The Green Years by A. J. Cronin topped the New York Times Fiction Best Sellers list.
- Born: Bernard Hill, actor, in Blackley, Manchester, England (d. 2024)

== December 18, 1944 (Monday) ==
- Typhoon Cobra struck the United States Pacific Fleet and did severe damage to Task Force 38. Destroyers Hull, Monaghan and Spence all foundered in the storm. The typhoon was a significant plot element in Herman Wouk's novel "The Caine Mutiny".
- Douglas MacArthur was made a five-star general in the U.S. Army.
- British troops in Greece began an offensive against the ELAS rebels.
- The Parisian daily newspaper Le Monde published its first edition.

== December 19, 1944 (Tuesday) ==
- German forces captured 9,000 surrounded U.S. troops in the Schnee Eifel region on the Belgian-German border and pushed the Americans back off German soil.
- Japanese aircraft carrier Unryū was torpedoed and sunk in the East China Sea by the American submarine Redfish.
- German submarine U-737 sank in a collision with depot ship MRS 25 in Vestfjorden, Norway.
- Chester Nimitz was made a five-star admiral in the U.S. Navy.
- Born: Tim Reid, actor, comedian and film director, in Norfolk, Virginia

== December 20, 1944 (Wednesday) ==
- The Siege of Bastogne began in Belgium as part of the Battle of the Bulge.
- Dwight D. Eisenhower was made a five-star general in the U.S. Army.
- British General Ronald Scobie warned Greek civilians to stay out of areas occupied by ELAS forces because they may be subjected to bombing raids.
- The U.S. Women Airforce Service Pilots was disbanded.

== December 21, 1944 (Thursday) ==
- The Battle of St. Vith ended in German victory with the fall of St. Vith itself.
- The Battle of Ormoc Bay ended in American victory.
- Henry H. Arnold was made a five-star general in the U.S. Army.
- The Walt Disney animated musical film The Three Caballeros premiered in Mexico City.
- Born: Bill Atkinson, footballer, in Sunderland, Tyne and Wear, England (d. 2013); Michael Tilson Thomas, conductor, pianist and composer, in Los Angeles, California (d. 2026); Zheng Xiaoyu, director of the Chinese State Food and Drug Administration, in Fuzhou, China (d. 2007)

== December 22, 1944 (Friday) ==
- U.S. General Anthony McAuliffe responded to a German command to surrender the besieged garrison at Bastogne with a brief reply centered on a full sheet of paper: "N U T S !"
- President Roosevelt signed the Flood Control Act of 1944.
- A provisional national government separate from the Ferenc Szálasi regime was formed in Hungary.
- The People's Army of Vietnam was formed.
- Born: Steve Carlton, baseball player, in Miami, Florida
- Died: Harry Langdon, 60, American comedian and actor

== December 23, 1944 (Saturday) ==
- In the Battle of the Bulge, the U.S. First Army withdrew from St. Vith while III Corps of the Third Army moved north to relieve the siege of Bastogne.
- As an economical measure, the U.S. government banned horse racing effective January 3.
- "Don't Fence Me In" by Bing Crosby and The Andrews Sisters went to #1 on the Billboard singles charts.
- Born: Wesley Clark, U.S. Army general, in Chicago, Illinois; Ingar Knudtsen, novelist and poet, in Smøla, Norway (d. 2025)

== December 24, 1944 (Sunday) ==
- The Belgian troopship Léopoldville was sunk by German submarine U-486 in the English Channel off Cherbourg. Approximately 763 American soldiers and 56 crew were killed.
- German tanks reached the furthest point of the Bulge at Celles.
- Fifty German V-1 flying bombs, air-launched from Heinkel He 111 bombers flying over the North Sea, targeted Manchester in England, killing 42 and injuring more than 100 in the Oldham area.
- Union Pacific 844. The last steam locomotive built by ALCO in Schenectady New York on Christmas Eve.
- Bande massacre. A total of 34 men between the ages of 17 and 32 were executed by the Sicherheitsdienst near Bande, Belgium in retaliation for the killing of three German soldiers.
- The Agana race riot began on Guam over the nights of December 24 and 25 between white and black members of the United States Marines. Some 43 Marines would be tried in courts-martial and receive prison terms over the rioting.
- Mosquito Bowl took place on Guadalcanal.
- Born: Erhard Keller, speed skater, in Günzburg, Germany; Woody Shaw, jazz trumpeter, in Laurinburg, North Carolina (d. 1989)
- Died: Endre Bajcsy-Zsilinszky, 58, Hungarian politician (executed); General Frederick W. Castle, while leading 2000 bombers over Belgium.

== December 25, 1944 (Monday) ==
- The U.S. Sixth Army captured Palompon, Leyte.
- Winston Churchill arrived in Athens to try to stop the fighting.
- The British frigate HMS Dakins was severely damaged by a mine off Ostend and rendered a constructive total loss.
- Born: Jairzinho, footballer, in Rio de Janeiro, Brazil; Henry Vestine, guitarist (Canned Heat), in Takoma Park, Maryland (d. 1997)
- Died: George Preddy, 25, American flying ace (shot down near Liège, Belgium by friendly fire)

== December 26, 1944 (Tuesday) ==
- The Battle of Leyte ended in decisive Allied victory.
- The Battle of Garfagnana (Known to the Germans as Operation Winter Storm and the Christmas offensive to the Italians) began.
- German submarine U-486 torpedoed the British frigates Affleck and Capel in the English Channel off Cherbourg. Affleck was declared a constructive total loss and Capel was sunk.
- German submarine U-2342 was sunk by a mine in the Baltic Sea north of Swinemünde.
- The Tennessee Williams play The Glass Menagerie premiered at the Civic Theatre in Chicago.
- Born: Bill Ayers, education theorist, anti-war activist and co-founder of the radical Weather Underground group, in Glen Ellyn, Illinois

== December 27, 1944 (Wednesday) ==
- The Siege of Bastogne ended in American victory.
- German submarine U-877 was depth charged and sunk northwest of the Azores by Canadian corvette HMCS St. Thomas using Squid.
- David Lloyd George announced his retirement from British Parliament.
- Born: Mick Jones, guitarist and founding member of the rock band Foreigner, in Somerton, England
- Died: Sára Salkaházi, 45, Hungarian religious sister (executed by the Arrow Cross Party for working to save Jews)

== December 28, 1944 (Thursday) ==
- American troops began gaining ground in their counteroffensive during the Battle of the Bulge. Adolf Hitler disregarded the advice of his generals and ordered renewed offensives in the Alsace and Ardennes regions.
- The Battle of Garfagnana ends in an Axis victory with Northern Tuscany falling back into Axis hands.
- At least 20 Allied soldiers perished when the Infantry Landing Ship Empire Javelin sank in the English Channel with 1,483 troops aboard. It is unknown whether she struck a naval mine or was torpedoed by the German submarine U-322 which was active in the area that day.
- German submarine U-735 was bombed and sunk by British aircraft off Horten, Norway.
- Hockey star Maurice Richard of the Montreal Canadiens showed up exhausted to the Montreal Forum after spending the day helping his family move from one apartment to another. That night he recorded eight points (five goals and three assists) during a 9–2 win over the Detroit Red Wings, a new NHL record for points by one player in a single game that stood until 1976.
- The stage musical On the Town with music by Leonard Bernstein and book and lyrics by Betty Comden and Adolph Green premiered on Broadway at the Adelphi Theatre.
- Born: Jane Lapotaire, actress, in Ipswich, Suffolk, England (d. 2026); Kary Mullis, biochemist and Nobel laureate, in Lenoir, North Carolina (d. 2019)

== December 29, 1944 (Friday) ==
- The Siege of Budapest by Soviet and Romanian forces began.
- German submarine U-322 was depth charged and sunk south of Weymouth, Dorset by Canadian corvette Calgary.
- British Commandos carried out Operation Partridge over the night of December 29/30, a diversionary raid behind German lines in Italy.

== December 30, 1944 (Saturday) ==
- The German 5th Panzer Army made another attempt to encircle Bastogne while the U.S. Third Army attacked toward Houffalize.
- From London, King George II of Greece proclaimed a regency and appointed Archbishop Damaskinos of Athens to the post.
- General Leslie Groves, director of the Manhattan Project, reported that an atomic bomb equivalent to 10,000 tons of TNT would be ready for testing by the summer of 1945.
- Part I of the Russian epic film Ivan the Terrible premiered in the Soviet Union. Part II would not be released until 1958.
- Born: Joseph Hilbe, statistician and philosopher, in Los Angeles, California (d. 2017)
- Died: Romain Rolland, 78, French writer and Nobel laureate

== December 31, 1944 (Sunday) ==
- The provisional government of Hungary declared war on Germany.
- Operation Ichi-Go ended in Japanese victory against Chinese forces.
- Twelve de Havilland Mosquitos of the RAF bombed Oslo, Norway, targeting a Gestapo headquarters in the city. The RAF initially believed the raid was successful, but the target building was in fact undamaged and other civilian buildings were hit instead. 78 Norwegians and 28 Germans were killed in the worst single incident in Oslo during the war.
- The Grumman F8F Bearcat entered service with the United States Navy.
- Born: Jan Widströmer, artist, in Malmbäck, Sweden
- Died: Vicente Lim, 56, Filipino general
