= Alberto De Agazio =

Italian general (1888–1943)

- Born: 5 September 1888; Messina, Kingdom of Italy
- Died: 1 October 1943 (aged 55); Schokken, Poland
- Military career
- Allegiance: Kingdom of Italy
- Branch: Royal Italian Army
- Service years: 1907–1943
- Rank: Major General
- Commands: 1st Mobile Artillery Group; 7th Army Corps Artillery Regiment
- Conflicts: Italo-Turkish War; World War I; First Battle of Monte Grappa; Second Battle of Monte Grappa; Second Italo-Ethiopian War; Battle of Amba Aradam; Italian invasion of Albania; World War II; Greco-Italian War; Operation Achse
- Awards: Silver Medal of Military Valor (twice); Order of the Crown of Italy; Colonial Order of the Star of Italy

Alberto De Agazio (Messina, 5 September 1888 – Schokken, 1 October 1943) was an Italian general during World War II.

== Biography ==
He was born in Messina on 5 September 1888, the son of Alfonso De Agazio. In 1907 he enrolled at the Royal Military Academy of Artillery and Engineers in Turin, graduating on 4 September 1908 with the rank of artillery second lieutenant, assigned to the 7th Field Artillery Regiment. In 1912 he took part in the Italo-Turkish War, and from 1915 to 1918 he fought in the First World War, reaching the rank of major of the 19th Field Artillery Regiment in 1918 and distinguishing himself during the fighting on Monte Asolone and Monte Grappa between December 18, 1917 and on June 15, 1918, for which he was awarded a Silver Medal of Military Valor.

After the end of the war he continued service with the 19th Field Artillery Regiment until 7 November 1920, when he was transferred to the 3rd Heavy Field Artillery Regiment. From 22 April 1922 he was transferred to the Central Artillery School of Bracciano. After promotion to lieutenant colonel on 1 December 1926, he was assigned to the Artillery Inspectorate in Rome, staying there for several years He participated in the Second Italo-Ethiopian War, commanding the 1st Mobile Artillery Group and distinguishing himself during the battle of the Endertà, for which he obtained promotion to colonel for merits of war, which took place on February 16, 1936, and the title of Knight of the Colonial Order of the Star of Italy. He then became commander of the 7th Army Corps Artillery Regiment in Florence until 1 September 1938, when he was assigned to the headquarters of the VII Army Corps. On 1 December of the same year he returned to the Artillery Inspectorate in Rome.

He remained there until the occupation of Albania when, in April 1939, he was assigned as commander of the artillery of the XXVI Army Corps in Tirana. On 1 July 1940 he was promoted to brigadier general, and in the following three years he became commander of the artillery of the Albania Armed Forces High Command and later (in 1943) commander of the artillery of the Ninth Army. On August 2, 1943, he was promoted to the rank of major general. On 12 September 1943 he was captured by the Germans following the Armistice of Cassibile and transferred to Oflag 64/Z in Schokken, Poland, where he suddenly died of a heart attack on the night of his arrival, on 1 October 1943. He was buried in the cemetery of Salka, near a small church and the wood next to the camp, after a solemn funeral ceremony which was also attended by the German command of the prisoner-of-war camp.
