= Davide Dusmet =

Italian general (1881–1943)

- Born: 17 June 1881; Naples, Kingdom of Italy
- Died: 24 November 1943 (aged 62); Schokken, Poland
- Military career
- Allegiance: Kingdom of Italy
- Branch: Royal Italian Army
- Rank: Brigadier General
- Commands: 1st Infantry Regiment "Re"; Military District of Siena; Dubrovnik garrison
- Conflicts: Italo-Turkish War; World War I; Battles of the Isonzo; World War II; Operation Achse
- Awards: Silver Medal of Military Valor (posthumous)

Davide Dusmet de Smours (Naples, 17 June 1881 – Schokken, 24 November 1943) was an Italian general during World War II.

== Biography ==
He was born in Naples in 1881, the son of Duke Giustino Dusmet, Marquis of Smours, and of Anna d'Evoli, Marquise of Trignano; his was an aristocratic family closely linked to the Bourbons. After enlisting in the Royal Italian Army, in 1904 he began to attend the Royal Academy of Modena as a cadet officer, graduating on 4 September 1905 as cavalry second lieutenant and being assigned to the 11th Light Cavalry Regiment of Foggia (Cavalleggeri di Foggia). He was promoted to lieutenant on 12 October 1908; from 2 April 1911 he was placed on leave for family reasons for six months. In 1912 he took part in the Italo-Turkish War, and on 31 December 1914 he was promoted to captain, serving with the 13th Regiment "Cavalleggeri di Monferrato".

He participated in the First World War with the 20th Regiment "Cavalleggeri di Roma", distinguishing himself on the Karst Plateau in 1916. On November 18, 1917 he was transferred to the infantry and assigned to the 32nd Infantry Regiment, Marche Infantry Brigade. After the war he continued serving in the 32nd Infantry Regiment with the rank of major, and was also an alternate judge at the territorial military court of Naples from 1 May 1924. From 10 June 1932, after promotion to colonel, he commanded the 1st Infantry Regiment "Re", then the military district of Siena and, from 20 May 1937, the military prisons of the Royal Italian Army until the beginning of 1938. He was promoted to brigadier general on 20 April 1938 and assigned to the Army Corps of Rome for special assignments until early 1939, when he was transferred to the reserve.

He was recalled into service on 10 February 1942, in the middle of World War II, and given command of the garrison of Dubrovnik. After the Armistice of Cassibile in September 1943 he was captured by German troops in Dubrovnik and sent as a prisoner of war to Poland, in Oflag 64/Z of Schokken, where he arrived on the following 2 October. During his captivity he came down with bronchitis, which became pneumonia due to the lack of medical care, and died in the night of 24 November 1943. He was buried in the Salka cemetery, near the church and the woods adjacent to the camp.
