= J. Frank Diggs =

American journalist

- Born: Jesse Frank Diggs; November 21, 1917; Hagerstown, Maryland
- Died: January 26, 2004 (aged 86); Arlington, Virginia
- Education: American University (BaEc); George Washington University(MaEc)
- Occupation: Journalist
- Employer(s): The Washington Post; U.S. News & World Report
- Spouses: Tracy Briscoe (m. 1942; death 1987) Elizabeth Anderson (m. 1987; death 2001)
- Children: 2

Jesse Frank Diggs (November 21, 1917 – January 26, 2004) was an American journalist. During World War II as a prisoner of war, he was held at Oflag 64 in Northern Poland. Before the war, he was a journalist at The Washington Post, and while a POW, he founded and edited a POW newspaper. After the war, he joined U.S. News & World Report, where he had a long career.

== Early life ==
Diggs was born in Hagerstown, Maryland in 1917. He attended American University and received a bachelor's degree in economics. He then attended George Washington University where he received a master's degree, also in economics. He then took a position as a journalist at the Washington Post, where he worked for three years before joining the Army in 1941 during World War II.

== World War II ==
In the Army, Diggs was a part of the 3rd Infantry Division during the U.S. invasion of Sicily in 1943, where he was captured and held as a prisoner at Oflag 64, a prison camp in northern Poland. As a POW, Diggs met with George Juskalian and together they founded and edited a POW newspaper which was based on reports from incoming POWs and German accounts. Among the journalist who wrote for the paper was Pulitzer prize winner, Larry Allen.

Near the end of the war, Diggs and other POWs were marched West into Germany away from approaching Soviet forces. During the march, Diggs and another officer, Nelson Tacy, escaped. They were taken in by a Polish family for several weeks and when the Soviet Army arrived in the area, they were safe and were able to return to U.S. forces. As a soldier, Diggs was awarded a Silver Star, Bronze Star and a Purple Heart.

== Journalism career ==
After the war, Diggs joined the U.S. News & World Report. He served the magazine for 37 years. Among his notable articles and his longest was a 13-page interview with politician John McCain, who was a POW in Vietnam for five and a half years. Diggs retired from the U.S. News as a senior editor in 1982.

After retirement, he continued to occasionally contribute articles to the Maturity News Service, which is syndicated widely.

Diggs also was the author of three books: Oflag 64-A Unique Prisoner of War Camp about his wartime internment, Americans Behind the Barbed Wire: World War II : Inside a German Prison Camp , and The Welcome Swede.

The Welcome Swede described Henry Söderberg (d. 1998), a Swedish attorney representing the YMCA, who visited the camps in that area (including Stalag Luft III, the camp of The Great Escape), delivering goods welcomed by the Allied POWs.

== Personal life and death ==
Diggs married twice, first to Tracy Briscoe in 1942. They had two daughters, Margaret and Debby. Tracy died in 1987 and Frank remarried to Elizabeth Anderson, who died in 2001.

Diggs died of pneumonia January 26, 2004 at Virginia Hospital Center-Arlington.

== Bibliography ==
- Dando-Collins, Stephen. The Big Break: The Greatest American WWII POW Escape Story Never Told. St. Martin's Press, 2017.
