= Umberto di Giorgio =

Italian general (1882–1943)

- Born: 14 March 1882; Rome, Kingdom of Italy
- Died: 30 November 1943 (aged 61); Schokken, Poland
- Military career
- Allegiance: Kingdom of Italy
- Branch: Royal Italian Army
- Rank: Lieutenant General
- Commands: 8th Bersaglieri Regiment; Territorial defense of Rome; Army Corps of Rome
- Conflicts: World War I; Battles of the Isonzo; Second Battle of the Piave River; Italian occupation of Albania; World War II; Operation Achse
- Awards: Silver Medal of Military Valour (posthumous); Bronze Medal of Military Valour (twice); War Cross of Military Valour; War Merit Cross; Order of the Crown of Italy

Umberto di Giorgio (14 March 1882 – 30 November 1943) was an Italian general during World War II, in charge of the territorial defense of Rome from 1939 till September 1943.

== Biography ==
He was born in Rome on March 14, 1882, the son of Giovanni di Giorgio, and enrolled at the Royal Military Academy of Infantry and Cavalry of Modena in 1899, graduating as cavalry second lieutenant on September 4, 1901, assigned to the 13th "Cavalleggeri di Monferrato" Regiment. He was promoted to lieutenant in 1907 and transferred to the 22nd "Cavalleggeri di Catania" Regiment till 1915, when he was assigned to the 12th "Cavalleggeri di Saluzzo" Regiment. Just before Italy's entrance into World War I he was promoted to captain, and after the outbreak of hostilities he immediately distinguished himself in action, receiving a War Merit Cross. He was then transferred to the Bersaglieri corps at his request and fought with the 3rd Bersaglieri Regiment, as aide-de-camp to the commander of the "Aosta" Infantry Brigade, Major General Giovanni Ghersi, receiving a Bronze Medal for Military Valour for his behavior during the fighting near Bovec between February and April 1916. In 1917 he was promoted to major and in June 1918 he distinguished himself during the Second Battle of the Piave River, leading an assault which resulted in the capture of an Austro-Hungarian trench, for which he was awarded a second bronze medal for Military Valour.

After the end of the war, in 1919 he served in Albania, and after returning to Italy in 1920 he was admitted to attend the courses of the Army School of War in Turin, which ended in 1921. After serving as staff officer at the command of the Army Corps of Rome, he was promoted to lieutenant colonel on June 30, 1923. In 1926 he was assigned to the command of the Staff officer corps in Rome; after promotion to colonel on September 17, 1928, he was given command of the 8th Bersaglieri Regiment, which he held until September 1933, when he was assigned to the Inspectorate of motorized troops, where he remained until his promotion to brigadier general on January 1, 1937. On that date he was transferred, to the Ministry of War for special assignments and became deputy commander of the 3rd Cavalry Division Principe Amedeo Duca d'Aosta, stationed in Verona. He held this post until August 31, 1938, when he was assigned to the command of the Army Corps of Bolzano, for special assignments.

After promotion to brigadier general on July 19, 1939, he served as judge at the Supreme Military Tribunal in Rome till the beginning of the Second World War, when he assumed command of the territorial defense of Rome, a post which he retained after promotion to lieutenant general on February 26, 1943. In August 1943 he also assumed command of the territorial Army Corps of Rome, replacing General Alberto Barbieri.

After the Armistice of Cassibile and the German capture of Rome, Di Giorgio was captured by the Germans on 28 September 1943 and imprisoned in Oflag 64/Z in Schokken, Poland. There he suffered a heart attack and died on November 30, 1943; he was buried in the cemetery next to the camp, after a ceremony that was also attended by the German officers of the prisoner-of-war camp.
