= Alberto Barbieri (general) =

World War II Italian General (1882 – ?)

Alberto Barbieri (21 December 1882 in Modena – ?) was an Italian Army Corps General during the Second World War.

He participated in the Italian-Turkish War and the First World War, at the end of which he had reached the rank of Lieutenant Colonel.

Promoted to General of Division on 1 July 1937, he became commander of the 61st Infantry Division "Sirte" in Misrata, Libya, until 9 June 1940. At the outbreak of World War II, he remained in Libya, receiving the command of the X Army Corps stationed on the Tunisian–Libyan border. His Corps saw no action in 1940–41. He was promoted to Army Corps General on 1 January 1941 and was replaced at the command of the X Corps by General Luigi Nuvoloni on 5 August 1941. He returned to Italy and on 5 October 1941 he became commander of the XVII Army Corps, responsible for the territorial defense of Lazio.

On 15 July 1943 he received command of the Army Corps of Rome, a new Corps that united all the territorial forces already in the military garrison of Rome. He was replaced as commander a few weeks later by Umberto di Giorgio, and at the time of the Armistice of Cassibile, managed to escape capture by the Germans, hiding in Rome.
In June 1944, he was first suspended and then discharged from the Army.
