= Army Corps Rome =

The Army Corps of Rome was a short-lived army corps of the Royal Italian Army during World War II, in which all the territorial forces of the military garrison of Rome were united in the summer of 1943.

== History ==
The Army Corps of Rome was formed on 15 July 1943, 6 days after the start of the Allied invasion of Sicily, by transformation of the Rome Presidio Command.
General Alberto Barbieri was appointed to command the Army Corps of Rome, but was soon replaced by General Umberto di Giorgio, who had been commander of territorial defense of Rome since 10 June 1940.

The Army Corps of Rome was based on the territorial units located in the Presidium of Rome, responsible for anti-aircraft and anti-parachute defense and for the maintenance of the public order.
The Army Corps of Rome was dissolved on 10 September 1943 following the Armistice of Cassibile, although after this date some units were engaged in defensive combat against German troops occupying the city. General Di Giorgio was taken prisoner and transferred to Poland where he died 2 months later of a heart attack.
