= Alessandro Vaccaneo =

Italian general (1883–1945)

- Born: 14 July 1883; Garlasco, Kingdom of Italy
- Died: 28 January 1945 (aged 61); Kuźnica Żelichowska, Poland
- Military career
- Allegiance: Kingdom of Italy
- Branch: Royal Italian Army
- Service years: 1903–1945
- Rank: Brigadier General
- Conflicts: World War I; Battles of the Isonzo; World War II; North African campaign; Italian occupation of Greece
- Awards: Silver Medal of Military Valor (posthumous); Bronze Medal of Military Valor; Order of the Crown of Italy

Alessandro Vaccaneo (14 July 1883 – 28 January 1945) was an Italian general during World War II.

== Biography ==
He was born in Garlasco, province of Pavia, on July 14, 1883, the son of Ruperto Vaccaneo and Maria Magnaghi. Having been initiated to a military career, he attended the Royal Military Academy of Infantry and Cavalry in Modena, graduating on 7 September 1903 with the rank of cavalry second lieutenant, assigned to the "Cavalleggeri di Piacenza" Regiment. After promotion to lieutenant, he was transferred to the 22nd "Cavalleggeri di Catania" Regiment on 10 September 1908. From March 16, 1911 he was transferred to the 16th "Cavalleggeri di Lucca" Regiment, while also becoming adjutant of General Roberto Brusati, commander of the 1st Army Corps.

After promotion to captain on March 31, 1915, he was transferred to the 24th "Cavalleggeri di Vicenza" Regiment with which he took part in the First World War, being wounded in the battles on the Karst plateau. At the end of the war, in 1919, he remained on leave for six months due to infirmities arising from service causes, after which he was assigned to the 16th "Cavalleggeri di Lucca" Regiment in Padua, then to the 19th "Cavalleggeri Guide" Regiment and finally, from 24 October 1920 to the Army motor vehicle corps, initially in the depot of Verona then in the central direction of Turin.

Having become a major in the 12th "Cavalleggeri di Saluzzo" Regiment, he was transferred to the 2nd Transport Group from 10 February 1924, and appointed judge at the Territorial Military Court of Milan, where he remained after promotion to the rank of lieutenant colonel. On 1 November he was transferred 1926 to the 3rd Automobile Center. From May 22, 1927 he returned to the 14th "Cavalleggeri di Alessandria" Regiment, and from January 1, 1933, after passing briefly to the 5th "Lancieri di Novara" Regiment, he was transferred to an auxiliary position at the 1st Military Division of Turin. He then passed into service at the headquarters of the military zone of Turin and was then placed on leave starting from 10 May 1937.

Having become colonel on June 4, 1934, and definitively passed to the automobile corps on 1 January 1940 and remained in Turin, being promoted to brigadier general of the reserve on January 1, 1942. From May 1941 to January 1942 he was in North Africa, in charge of motorized transport services, earning a Bronze Medal of Military Valor. From 10 January 1943 he became head of the motorized transport services of the intendency of the Armed Forces High Command of Greece (11th Army), with headquarters in Athens. There, after the proclamation of the armistice of Cassibile on 8 September 1943, he was captured by the Germans on 16 September and sent to Offizierlager 64 /Z of Schokken, Poland.

When the Red Army reached the Vistula in mid-January 1945, the Nazi command decided to evacuate the camp and transfer the internees to Luckenwalde, a town south of Berlin. Along with sixteen other prisoners (the weakest of the column, who were too exhausted to continue the march and made a stop with the permission of the German commander, who however refused to write a statement that they had been left behind with his consent rather than escaped), Vaccaneo stopped on the way, in Kuźnica Żelichowska, looking for food in a tavern; the group was however noticed by a non-commissioned officer of the Luftwaffe and reported to the SS. The latter rounded up the prisoners and forced them to resume the march, shooting those who were unable to keep pace with the main group; Vaccaneo was shot after slipping on ice, as he was trying to get back on his feet. Generals Carlo Spatocco, Emanuele Balbo Bertone, Alberto Trionfi, Giuseppe Andreoli and Ugo Ferrero were likewise executed nearby. Vaccaneo was buried by the locals in the village cemetery.
