= Donji Stoliv =

- Village
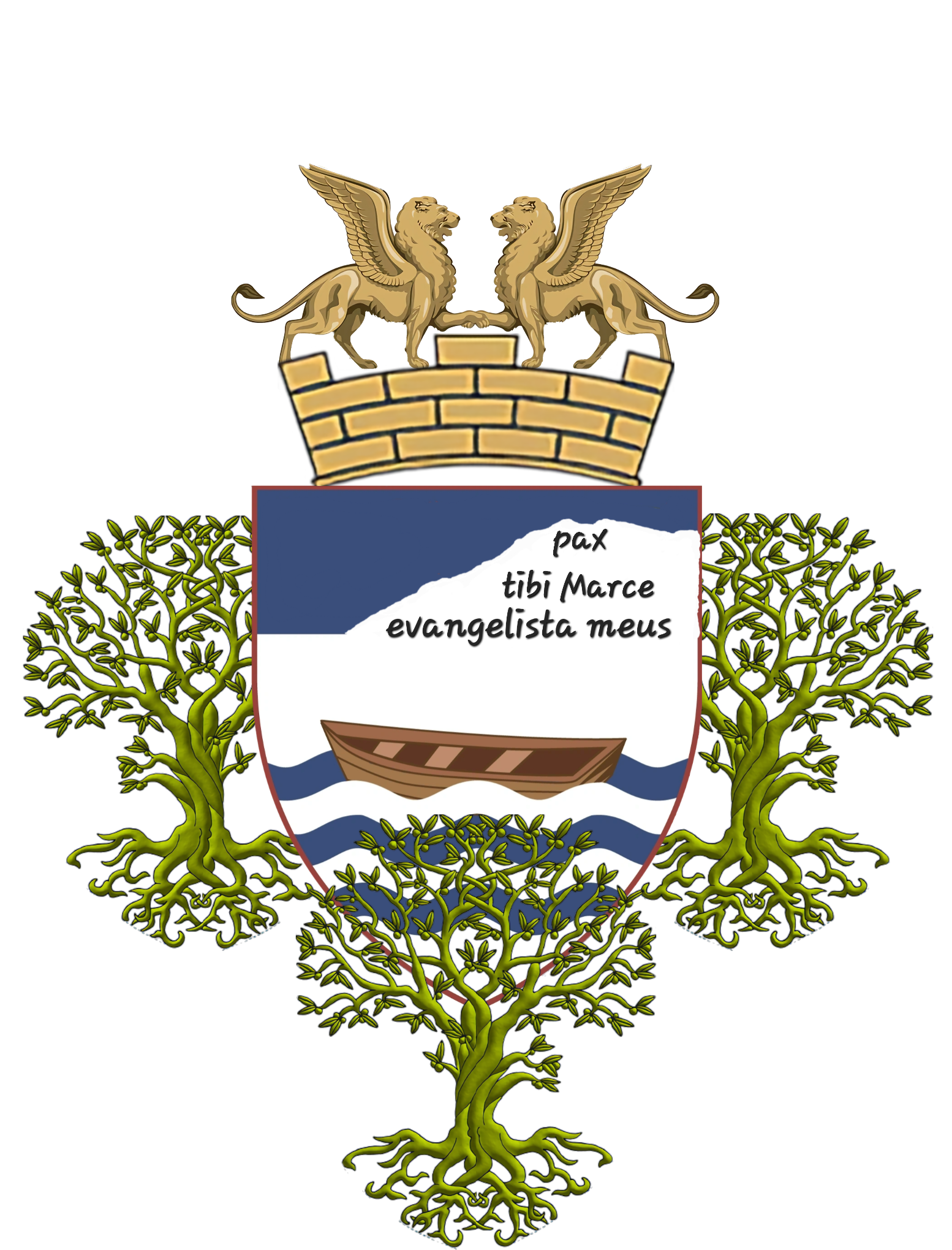
- Flag

- Location within Montenegro
- Coordinates: 42.472367°N 18.712383°E
- Country: Montenegro
- Region: Coastal
- Municipality: Kotor

Population (2011)
  - Total: 348
- Time zone: UTC+1 (CET)
  - Summer (DST): UTC+2 (CEST)

Donji Stoliv is a village in the municipality of Kotor, Montenegro.

Coat of arms: https://commons.wikimedia.org/wiki/File:Stoliv_Flag.png

== Demographics ==
According to the 2011 census, its population was 348.

Ethnicity in 2011
| Ethnicity | Number | Percentage |
|---|---|---|
| Montenegrins | 150 | 43.1% |
| Serbs | 97 | 27.9% |
| Croats | 58 | 16.7% |
| other/undeclared | 43 | 12.4% |
| Total | 348 | 100% |
