= German submarine U-297 =

German World War II submarine

History

Nazi Germany
- Name: U-297
- Ordered: 14 October 1941
- Builder: Bremer Vulkan Werft, Bremen-Vegesack
- Yard number: 62
- Laid down: 27 January 1943
- Launched: 9 October 1943
- Commissioned: 17 November 1943
- Fate: Sunk on or after 6 December 1944

General characteristics
- Class & type: Type VIIC/41 submarine
- Displacement: 759 tonnes (747 long tons) surfaced; 860 t (846 long tons) submerged
- Length: 67.10 m (220 ft 2 in) o/a; 50.50 m (165 ft 8 in) pressure hull
- Beam: 6.20 m (20 ft 4 in) o/a; 4.70 m (15 ft 5 in) pressure hull
- Height: 9.60 m (31 ft 6 in)
- Draught: 4.74 m (15 ft 7 in)
- Installed power: 2,800–3,200 PS (2,100–2,400 kW; 2,800–3,200 bhp) (diesels); 750 PS (550 kW; 740 shp) (electric)
- Propulsion: 2 shafts; 2 × diesel engines; 2 × electric motors
- Speed: 17.7 knots (32.8 km/h; 20.4 mph) surfaced; 7.6 knots (14.1 km/h; 8.7 mph) submerged
- Range: 8,500 nmi (15,700 km; 9,800 mi) at 10 knots (19 km/h; 12 mph) surfaced; 80 nmi (150 km; 92 mi) at 4 knots (7.4 km/h; 4.6 mph) submerged
- Test depth: 250 m (820 ft); Crush depth: 275–325 m (902–1,066 ft)
- Complement: 4 officers, 40–56 enlisted
- Armament: 5 × 53.3 cm (21 in) torpedo tubes (four bow, one stern); 14 × torpedoes; 1 × 8.8 cm (3.46 in) deck gun (220 rounds); 1 × 3.7 cm (1.5 in) Flak M42 AA gun; 2 × 2 cm (0.79 in) C/30 AA guns

Service record
- Part of: 8th U-boat Flotilla; 17 November 1943 – 31 October 1944; 11th U-boat Flotilla; 1 November – 6 December 1944
- Identification codes: M 54 472
- Commanders: Oblt.z.S. Wolfgang Aldermann; 17 November 1943 – 6 December 1944
- Operations: 1 patrol: 25 November – 6 December 1944
- Victories: None

German submarine U-297 was a Type VIIC/41 U-boat of Nazi Germany's Kriegsmarine during World War II.

She was laid down on 27 January 1943 by the Bremer Vulkan Werft (yard) at Bremen-Vegesack as yard number 62, launched on 9 October 1943 and commissioned on 17 November with Oberleutnant zur See Wolfgang Aldermann in command.

In one patrol, she did not sink or damage any ships.

She was sunk by a British aircraft on or after 6 December 1944. Fifty men died; there were no survivors.

== Design ==
German Type VIIC/41 submarines were preceded by the shorter Type VIIB submarines. U-297 had a displacement of 759 tonnes (747 long tons) when at the surface and 860 tonnes (850 long tons) while submerged. She had a total length of 67.10 m (220 ft 2 in), a pressure hull length of 50.50 m (165 ft 8 in), a beam of 6.20 m (20 ft 4 in), a height of 9.60 m (31 ft 6 in), and a draught of 4.74 m (15 ft 7 in). The submarine was powered by two Germaniawerft F46 four-stroke, six-cylinder supercharged diesel engines producing a total of 2,800 to 3,200 metric horsepower (2,060 to 2,350 kW; 2,760 to 3,160 shp) for use while surfaced, two AEG GU 460/8–27 double-acting electric motors producing a total of 750 metric horsepower (550 kW; 740 shp) for use while submerged. She had two shafts and two 1.23 m (4 ft) propellers. The boat was capable of operating at depths of up to 230 metres (750 ft).

The submarine had a maximum surface speed of 17.7 knots (32.8 km/h; 20.4 mph) and a maximum submerged speed of 7.6 knots (14.1 km/h; 8.7 mph). When submerged, the boat could operate for 80 nautical miles (150 km; 92 mi) at 4 knots (7.4 km/h; 4.6 mph); when surfaced, she could travel 8,500 nautical miles (15,700 km; 9,800 mi) at 10 knots (19 km/h; 12 mph). U-297 was fitted with five 53.3 cm (21 in) torpedo tubes (four fitted at the bow and one at the stern), fourteen torpedoes, one 8.8 cm (3.46 in) SK C/35 naval gun, (220 rounds), one 3.7 cm (1.5 in) Flak M42 and two 2 cm (0.79 in) C/30 anti-aircraft guns. The boat had a complement of between forty-four and sixty.

== Service history ==
The boat's service life began with training with the 8th U-boat Flotilla in November 1943. She was then transferred to the 11th flotilla for operations on 1 November 1944.

She made the short journey from Kiel in Germany to Horten Naval Base in Norway, arriving on 18 November 1944.

=== Patrol and loss ===
U-297's only patrol began from Horten; it took her through the 'gap' between the Faroe and the Shetland Islands.

She was sunk by a Sunderland flying boat of No. 201 Squadron RAF on 6 December 1944, 16 nautical miles (30 km; 18 mi) west of Yesnaby in the Orkney Islands.

=== Previously recorded fate and wreck discovery ===
U-297 was originally thought to have been sunk on 6 December 1944 by depth charges dropped by the British frigates HMS Loch Inch and Goodall. She had also been listed as missing since 3 January 1945 probably in the Pentland Firth.

The wreck of U-297 was found and identified in May 2000. It lies at a depth of 285 ft (87 m).

== See also ==
- Battle of the Atlantic (1939-1945)

== Bibliography ==
- Gröner, Erich; Jung, Dieter; Maass, Martin (1991). U-boats and Mine Warfare Vessels. German Warships 1815–1945. Vol. 2. Translated by Thomas, Keith; Magowan, Rachel. London: Conway Maritime Press. ISBN 0-85177-593-4.
- Busch, Rainer; Röll, Hans-Joachim (1999). German U-boat commanders of World War II : a biographical dictionary. Translated by Brooks, Geoffrey. London, Annapolis, Md: Greenhill Books, Naval Institute Press. ISBN 1-55750-186-6.
- Busch, Rainer; Röll, Hans-Joachim (1999). Deutsche U-Boot-Verluste von September 1939 bis Mai 1945 [German U-boat losses from September 1939 to May 1945]. Der U-Boot-Krieg (in German). Vol. IV. Hamburg; Berlin; Bonn: Mittler. ISBN 3-8132-0514-2.
- Kemp, Paul (1999). U-Boats Destroyed - German Submarine Losses in the World Wars. London: Arms & Armour. ISBN 1-85409-515-3.
