= Alberto Trionfi =

Italian general (1892–1945)

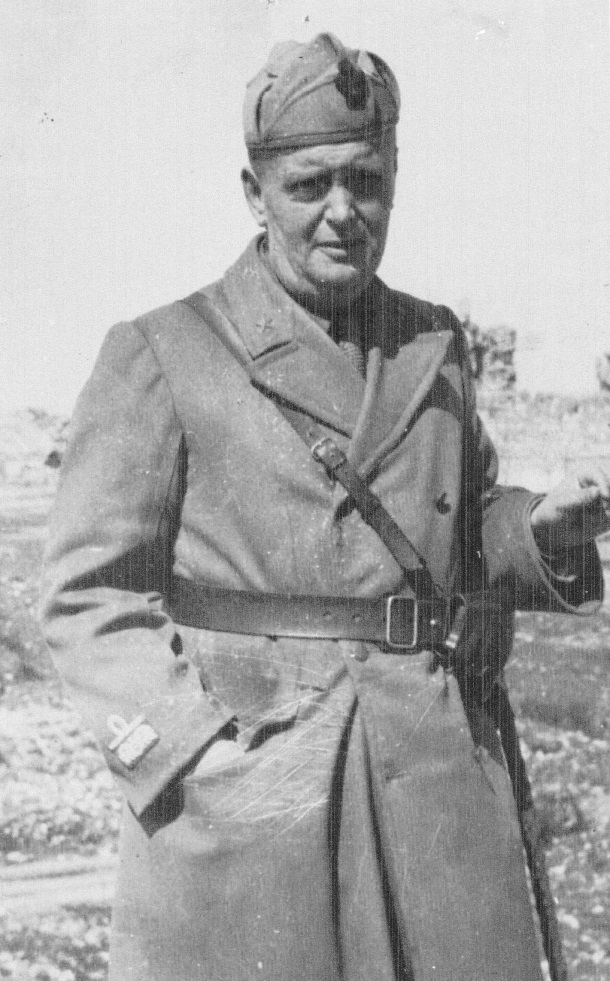
- Born: 2 July 1892; Jesi, Kingdom of Italy
- Died: 28 January 1945 (aged 52); Kuźnica Żelichowska, Poland
- Military career
- Allegiance: Kingdom of Italy
- Branch: Royal Italian Army
- Service years: 1911–1945
- Rank: Brigadier General
- Commands: 3rd Grenadiers of Sardinia Regiment; Military School of Rome
- Conflicts: First Italo-Senussi War; World War I; Battles of the Isonzo; Italian invasion of Albania; World War II; Greco-Italian War
- Awards: Silver Medal of Military Valour (posthumous); Bronze Medal of Military Valor (twice); War Merit Cross

Alberto Trionfi (2 July 1892 – 28 January 1945) was an Italian general during World War II.

== Biography ==
He was born into an aristocratic family, the fourth and last son of Marquis Riccardo Trionfi, owner of ships employed in trade with the Americas during the nineteenth century; he was initiated into a military career like his brothers Giuseppe (who would become an Admiral in the Regia Marina) and Luigi (who would also become a General). On 7 November 1911 he entered the Military Academy of Modena, from which he graduated in February 1913 as a second lieutenant in the grenadiers. He fought in the First Italo-Senussi War (from April 1914 to March 1916, being promoted to lieutenant in July 1915 and to captain in January 1916) and then in the First World War, being wounded three times in the battles on the Karst and earning a Bronze Medal of Military Valor during the Eleventh Battle of the Isonzo. After attending the Army War School in Turin from 1926 to 1926, in January 1927 he was promoted to major. From 1931 he was in service at the Military Division of Naples, being promoted to lieutenant colonel in May 1932, made head of the Transport Section of the Army Corps of Naples in 1935, and then deputy chief of staff of the same Army Corps on the following year.

From 1937 to 1939 he commanded the 3rd Grenadiers of Sardinia Regiment, participating in the occupation of Albania. Having become a colonel in 1937, in October 1939 he was made chief of staff of the 51st Infantry Division Siena, stationed in Albania, until August 1940, when he became chief of staff of the 57th Infantry Division Lombardia. In late 1940 he participated in the Greco-Italian War, where he was awarded another Bronze Medal. He later served as chief of staff and was then attached to the Army General Staff, to the Territorial Defence Command of Rome (from May to September 1941), and to the command of the XVII Army Corps in Rome (from September to November 1941). After commanding the Rome Military School from November 1941 to October 1942 he was promoted to brigadier general and given command of the infantry of the 59th Infantry Division Cagliari, stationed in the Peloponnese for occupation duties, with headquarters in Navarino. When the armistice of Cassibile was announced, on 8 September 1943, Trionfi had just returned to Greece after a period of leave in Rome, and on 18 September he was arrested by the Germans along with his superior Paolo Angioy and sent to Oflag 64/Z in Schokken. During his captivity in Schokken, Trionfi kept a diary, and was able to write home from January 1944.

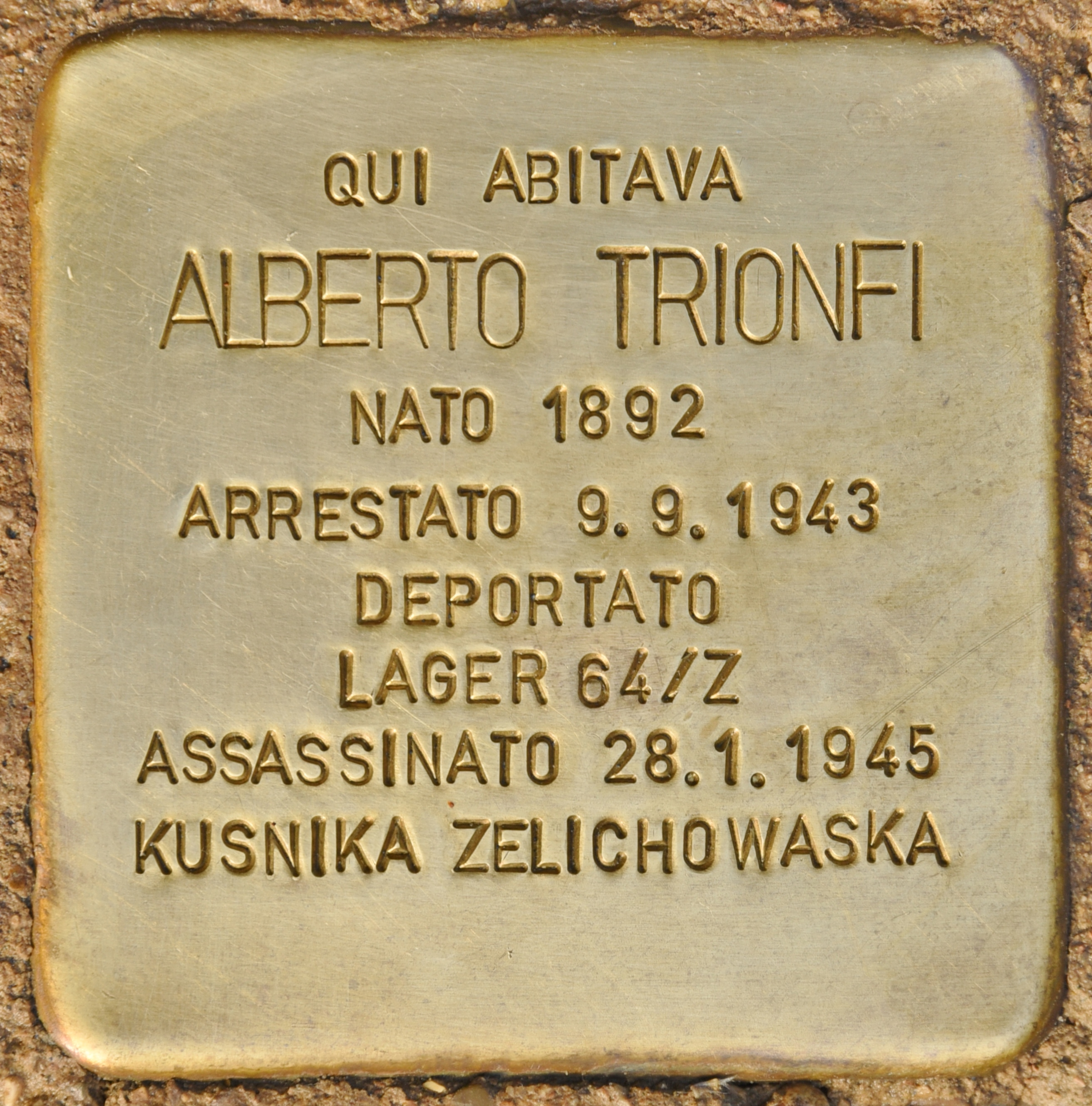
Stolperstein in memory of Alberto Trionfi, Rome, Italy

When the Red Army reached the Vistula in January 1945, the Nazis decided to evacuate the camp and transfer the prisoners to Luckenwalde, a town south of Berlin, with a forced march. Along with sixteen other prisoners (the weakest of the column, who were too exhausted to continue the march and made a stop with the permission of the German commander, who however refused to write a statement that they had been left behind with his consent rather than escaped), Trionfi stopped on the way, in Kuźnica Żelichowska, looking for food in a tavern; the group was however noticed by a non-commissioned officer of the Luftwaffe and reported to the SS. The latter rounded up the prisoners and forced them to resume the march, shooting those who were unable to keep pace with the main group. General Carlo Spatocco was the first to be killed, followed by General Emanuele Balbo Bertone; then Trionfi was shot in turn. After him, generals Alessandro Vaccaneo, Giuseppe Andreoli and Ugo Ferrero were likewise murdered. In May 1945 Trionfi's family was wrongly notified by the Italian embassy in Moscow that he was alive and in good health, but on the following month they received a letter of apology with the news of his death. In 1956 Trionfi's remains were excavated and returned to Italy. The general's daughter, Maria Trionfi, managed to identify the SS officer who had ordered the massacre with the help of Simon Wiesenthal and tried to have him brought to justice, but without success.
