= Emanuele Balbo Bertone =

Italian general (1886–1945)

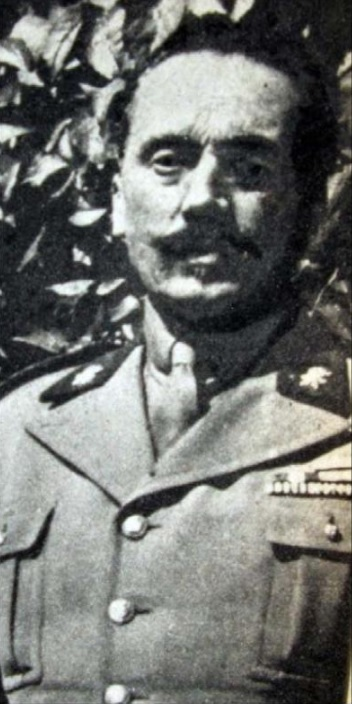
- Born: 9 August 1886; Chieri, Kingdom of Italy
- Died: 28 January 1945 (aged 58); Kuźnica Żelichowska, Poland
- Military career
- Allegiance: Kingdom of Italy
- Branch: Royal Italian Army
- Service years: 1909–1945
- Rank: Brigadier General
- Commands: 4th Coastal Brigade
- Conflicts: Italo-Turkish War; Battle of Ain Zara; Battle of Zanzur; World War I; Italian Front; World War II
- Awards: Silver Medal of Military Valor (posthumous); Bronze Medal of Military Valor (twice)

Count Emanuele Balbo Bertone di Sambuy, Marquess of Breme (9 August 1886 – 28 January 1945) was an Italian general during World War II.

== Biography ==
He was born into an aristocratic family, the son of Raimondo Balbo Bertone, Count of Sambuy, who died before his birth. He was initiated into a military career starting to attend the Royal Academy of Infantry and Cavalry in Modena graduating on 19 September 1909 with the rank of cavalry second lieutenant, under the cavalry weapon, assigned to the "Piemonte Reale" Cavalry Regiment. He participated with this regiment in the Italo-Turkish War, where he was awarded a Bronze Medal of Military Valor for having distinguished himself in the battles Ain Zara and of Zanzur. On 17 October 1912, with the rank of lieutenant, he became the adjutant of lieutenant general Pietro Frugoni. After promotion to captain, he took part in the First World War, commanding his regiment’s 240 mm bombard battery and earning a second bronze medal for military valor.

At the end of the war he was made redundant and placed on leave at his request from 1 July 1920, returning to his residence in Turin. Having been promoted to major in the Army reserve on 31 March 1926 and to lieutenant colonel in December 1929, he was recalled into active service on 5 October 1935 and was assigned to the military zone of Turin. He was then again placed on leave and promoted to colonel on 1 January 1938; following Italy’s entry into the Second World War, on 12 June 1940 he was recalled into active service and assigned to the staff of Umberto of Savoy, Prince of Piedmont.

He remained with the Prince after his promotion to brigadier general of the reserve, which took place on 1 January 1942, and from the following 31 October he was given command of the 4th Coastal Brigade in Tempio Pausania, Sardinia. He remained in Sardinia until 24 March 1943, when he returned to Turin, where he was attached to the local territorial defense command for special assignments; he later became president of the military tribunal of Florence, where he was at the time of the Armistice of Cassibile.

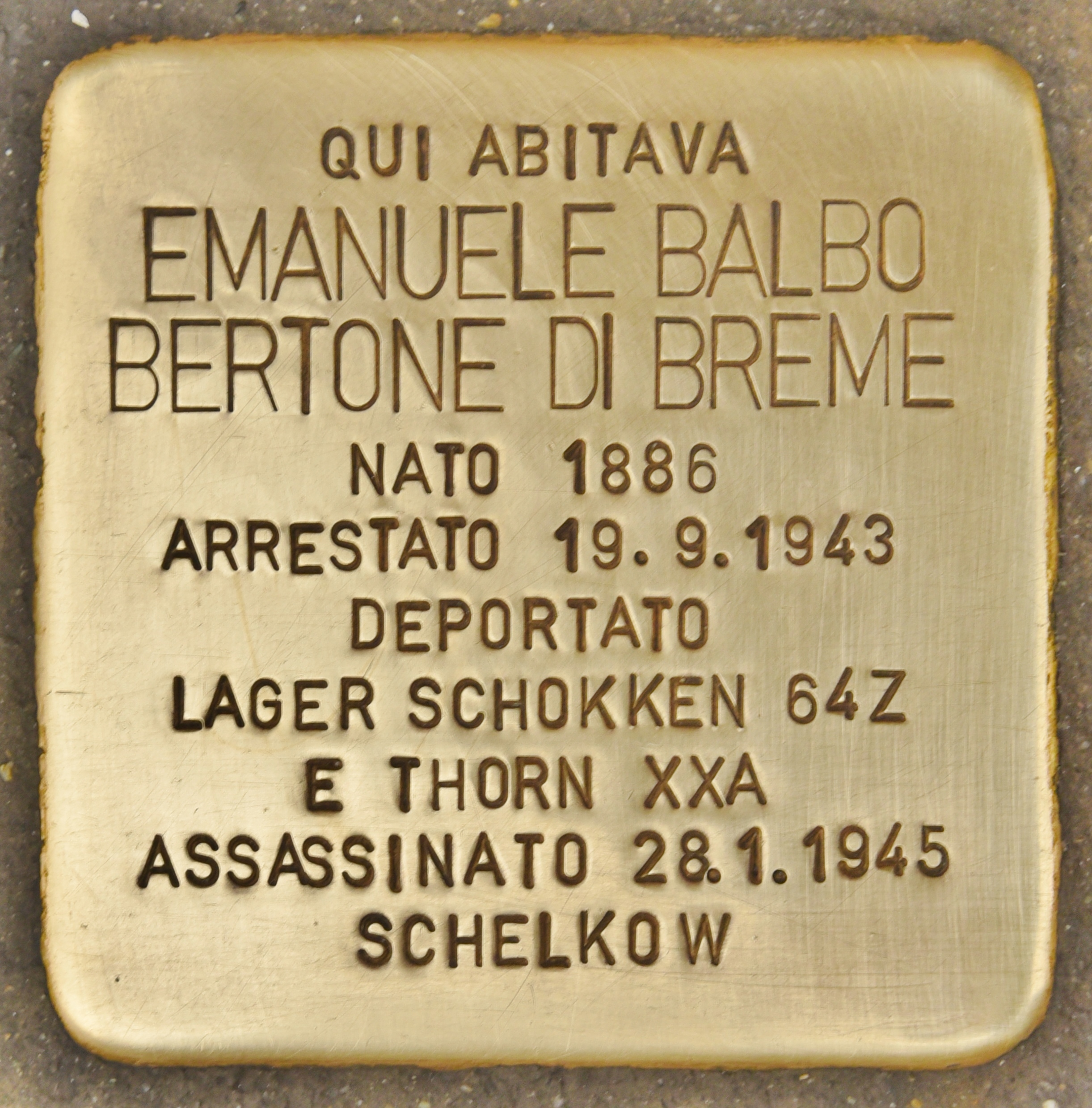
Stolperstein commemorating General Balbo Bertone in Turin

On 22 September 1943 he was captured by German troops and sent to Oflag 64/Z in Schokken, Poland, where he remained until early 1945.

With the Red Army reaching the Vistula in mid-January 1945, the Nazis decided to evacuate the camp and transfer the prisoners to Luckenwalde, south of Berlin, with a forced march. Along with other sixteen prisoners, Balbo Bertone stopped on the way in Kuźnica Żelichowska along with some companions, looking for food in a tavern, but they were noticed by a non-commissioned officer of the Luftwaffe and reported to the SS. As the march resumed, the SS started shooting the prisoners who were unable to walk fast enough to keep pace with the main group; Balbo Bertone was the second to be killed, after General Carlo Spatocco. After him generals Alberto Trionfi, Alessandro Vaccaneo, Giuseppe Andreoli and Ugo Ferrero were likewise murdered. Balbo Bertone was buried by the locals in the village cemetery.
