= Giuseppe Andreoli (general) =

Italian military officer (1892–1945)

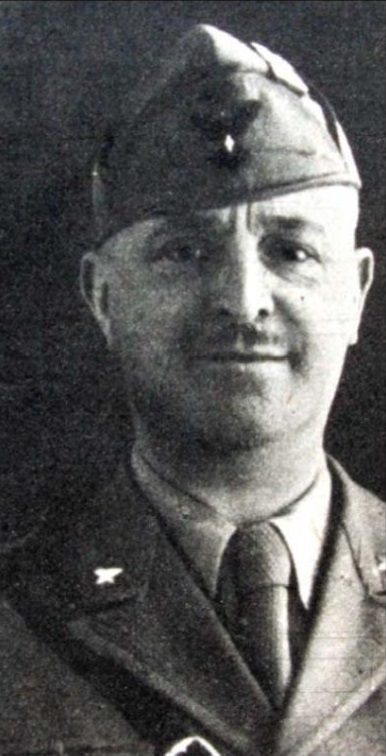
- Born: 11 June 1892; Milan, Kingdom of Italy
- Died: 28 January 1945 (aged 52); Kuźnica Żelichowska, Poland
- Military career
- Allegiance: Kingdom of Italy
- Branch: Royal Italian Army
- Service years: 1912–1945
- Rank: Brigadier General
- Commands: 30th Artillery Regiment "Argens" Tactical Group; 224th Coastal Division; 2nd Cavalry Division Emanuele Filiberto Testa di Ferro
- Conflicts: World War I; Battles of the Isonzo; Italian invasion of Albania; World War II; Battle of the Western Alps; Greco-Italian War; Italian occupation of France; Operation Achse
- Awards: Silver Medal of Military Valor (posthumous); Order of Saints Maurice and Lazarus

Giuseppe Andreoli (11 June 1892 – 28 January 1945) was an Italian military officer during World War II.

== Biography ==
He was born in Milan on 11 June 1892, the son of Guglielmo Androni, and in 1909 he entered the Royal Military Academy of Artillery and Engineers in Turin, graduating on February 23, 1913 with the rank of artillery second lieutenant, assigned to the 10th Field Artillery Regiment. During the First World War he was promoted to lieutenant and then to captain for war merit in the battles on the Karst plateau. After the war he served with the 6th Heavy Field Artillery Regiment and attended the courses of the Army School of War in 1922-1923, after which he was attached to the staff of the Military Division of Treviso and later of that of Trieste.

He was promoted to major in 1926 and to lieutenant colonel in 1927, serving for the next ten years in the General Staff Corps; on 1 January 1937 he was promoted to colonel and given command of the 30th Artillery Regiment, part of the 7th Infantry Division Lupi di Toscana, with which he was sent to Albania in April 1939 when Italy invaded that country. In the following August he was called to direct the Information Office of the Armed Forces High Command Albania and on the following year he was given the same assignment at the Command of the Army of the Po on the eve of the entry of the Kingdom of Italy into World War II, which took place on 10 June 1940.

In June 1940, he participated in the operations on the western frontier against France. He was later made Chief of Staff of the 4th Army Corps, and then of the 9th Army, deployed on the Greek-Albanian front, until 29 June 1941. On 1 July 1941, he was promoted to brigadier general, being then given command of the artillery of the 1st Army Corps in Turin. From 12 January 1943, he was assigned to the headquarters of the 4th Army in Provence and given command of the "Argens" Tactical Group (composed of the 7th Alpini Regiment, the 18th Bersaglieri Regiment, two artillery groups and smaller units), which was then dissolved on 4 April. On 26 April 1943, having been temporarily elevated to the rank of major general, he assumed command of the 224th Coastal Division in Nice, replacing General Luigi Mazzini, and on 6 August he replaced General Mario Badino Rossi as commander of the 2nd Cavalry Division Emanuele Filiberto Testa di Ferro, garrisoning the area between Menton, Antibes, Saint Tropez and the Italian border.

When the Armistice of Cassibile was announced, on 8 September 1943, the Division was in the process of being repatriated, and was ordered to take up position between Cuneo and the French border in order to slow down the German advance and allow other Italian units that were still in France to cross the border. On 18 September, Andreoli was captured by German troops in Cuneo, being then sent to Oflag 64/Z in Schokken, Poland, where he remained until early 1945. In mid-January, with the Red Army reaching the Vistula, the Nazi command decided to evacuate the camp and transfer its internees to Luckenwalde, south of Berlin, with a forced march. Along with sixteen other prisoners (the weakest of the column, who were too exhausted to continue the march and made a stop with the permission of the German commander, who however refused to write a statement that they had been left behind with his consent rather than escaped), Andreoli stopped on the way, in Kuźnica Żelichowska, looking for food in a tavern; the group was however noticed by a non-commissioned officer of the Luftwaffe and reported to the SS. The latter rounded up the prisoners and forced them to resume the march, shooting those who were unable to keep pace with the main group; Andreoli, who walked too slowly, was among those thus murdered, along with generals Carlo Spatocco, Emanuele Balbo Bertone, Alberto Trionfi, Alessandro Vaccaneo and Ugo Ferrero. He was buried by the locals in the village cemetery.
