= Ugo Ferrero =

Italian general (1892–1945)

- Born: 15 July 1892; Chieti, Kingdom of Italy
- Died: 28 January 1945 (aged 52); Kuźnica Żelichowska, Poland
- Military career
- Allegiance: Kingdom of Italy
- Branch: Royal Italian Army
- Rank: Brigadier General
- Conflicts: Italo-Turkish War; World War I; Battle of Vittorio Veneto; World War II
- Awards: Silver Medal of Military Valour (posthumous); War Cross of Military Valor; Order of the Crown of Italy

Ugo Ferrero (15 July 1892 – 28 January 1945) was an Italian general during World War II.

== Biography ==
He was born in Chieti on 15 July 1892, the son of Vincenzo Ferrero, and after attending the Royal Military Academy of Infantry and Cavalry in Modena he graduated on 17 September 1911 with the rank of infantry second lieutenant. He was then immediately sent to Libya where he participated in the Italian-Turkish war. He took part in the First World War with the ranks of captain and major, obtaining a War Cross for Military Valor for his behaviour during the fighting on Monte Grappa during the battle of Vittorio Veneto, while attached to the 22nd Division. Having become lieutenant colonel from 16 November 1927, he was military attaché at the Italian embassy in the Weimar Republic and, in 1934, he became a teacher of German at the Royal Academy of Infantry and Cavalry in Modena, where he remained until 31 December 1935, when he was discharged from active service. He was married to Miss Francesca Intonti.

With the outbreak of the Second World War, he was recalled into service as a colonel of the reserve, and was promoted to brigadier general of the reserve on 1 January 1942, being then given command of a special assessment course for non-commissioned officers who signed up for training as officer cadets, hosted at the Ducal Palace of Sassuolo. On 9 September 1943, after the proclamation of the armistice of Cassibile, a SS unit attacked the Ducal Palace, and Ferrero opened to open fire on the attackers; after two hours of fighting, in which two men and been killed and two dozen wounded, he ordered to cease resistance. He was then imprisoned in Oflag 64/Z in Schokken, Poland, where he fell seriously ill with tuberculosis; in spite of his condition, he refused to an offer to be repatriated and cured in exchange for swearing allegiance to the Italian Social Republic. In late January 1945, with the Red Army approaching, the Germans decided to evacuate the prisoners westward with a forced march on the snow; during the march, on 28 January, Ferrero was murdered by the SS for being unable to keep pace with the group, along with generals Carlo Spatocco, Alberto Trionfi, Emanuele Balbo Bertone, Giuseppe Andreoli and Alessandro Vaccaneo. Ferrero was the last to be killed; General Ettore De Blasio later recounted his last words before collapsing and being shot had been "I can no longer walk, my foot is swollen, my legs cannot hold me. I know the fate that awaits me; tell my wife how I died". Unlike the other generals, his body was never recovered; in May 1945 his family was wrongly informed by the Italian Embassy in Moscow that he was alive and well, but one month later they were notified of his death.
