= Carlo Spatocco =

Italian general during World War II

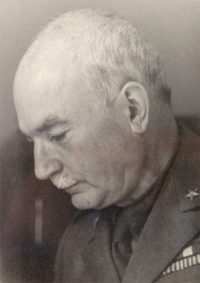
- Born: 31 May 1883; Chieti, Kingdom of Italy
- Died: 28 January 1945 (aged 61); Kuźnica Żelichowska, Poland
- Military career
- Allegiance: Kingdom of Italy
- Branch: Royal Italian Army
- Rank: Lieutenant general
- Commands: 17th Infantry Regiment; Sila Infantry Brigade; 63rd Infantry Division Cirene; XXI Army Corps; Tripoli Fortress Area; XX Army Corps; IV Army Corps
- Conflicts: Italo-Turkish War; Battle of Zanzur; World War I; Isonzo Front; Second Italo-Ethiopian War; Battle of Amba Aradam; World War II; Italian invasion of Egypt; Operation Achse
- Awards: Silver Medal of Military Valour (posthumous); Bronze Medal of Military Valour (twice); Military Order of Savoy

Carlo Spatocco (31 May 1883 – 28 January 1945) was an Italian general during World War II.

== Biography ==
Spatocco was born in Chieti on 31 May 1883, the son of Francesco Spatocco, and after enlisting in the Royal Italian Army he participated in the Italo-Turkish War with the rank of lieutenant. He distinguished himself in the battle of Zanzur (8 June 1912), for which he was decorated with a Bronze Medal of Military Valour. During the First World War he distinguished himself in October 1916 on the Veliki Kribak, receiving another Bronze Medal of Military Valour. After the war he commanded the 17th Infantry Regiment "Acqui" with the rank of colonel.

He participated in the Second Italo-Ethiopian War, fighting in the battle of Amba Aradam, and after promotion to brigadier general, on 16 June 1936, he assumed command of the "Sila" Infantry Brigade. In 1937 he was briefly appointed Administrative Director at the Personnel Office of the Ministry of War in Rome. After promotion to major general on 1 September 1937, he assumed command of the 63rd Infantry Division Cirene, stationed in North Africa, which he kept until 19 September 1940, when he was replaced by General Alessandro de Guidi and took command of the XXI Army Corps for a brief period.
In 1941 he assumed command of the Tripoli Fortress Area, later renamed XX Army Corps, and on 1 July of the same year he was promoted to lieutenant general. On November 29, he assumed command of the IV Army Corps stationed in Albania, replacing General Camillo Mercalli.

When the Armistice of Cassibile was announced, on 8 September 1943, the corps under his command, operating within the 9th Army of General Renzo Dalmazzo, was deployed in Albania, with headquarters in Durrës, and consisted of three infantry divisions (11th Infantry Division Brennero, 49th Infantry Division Parma and 151st Infantry Division Perugia) in addition to various smaller units.

The IV Corps was overrun by German forces during Operation Achse, and on 21 September Spatocco was captured and transferred first to Germany and then to officer POW camp 64Z in Schokken (now Skoki) in Poland, where most Italian generals and admirals captured during Operation Achse had been imprisoned. In January 1945, with the Red Army approaching, the camp was evacuated with a forced march through the snow. Spatocco, unable to keep pace with the other prisoners, was murdered by the SS on 28 January 1945, along with Generals Alberto Trionfi, Emanuele Balbo Bertone, Giuseppe Andreoli, Ugo Ferrero and Alessandro Vaccaneo.
