= Kuźnica Żelichowska =

- Village
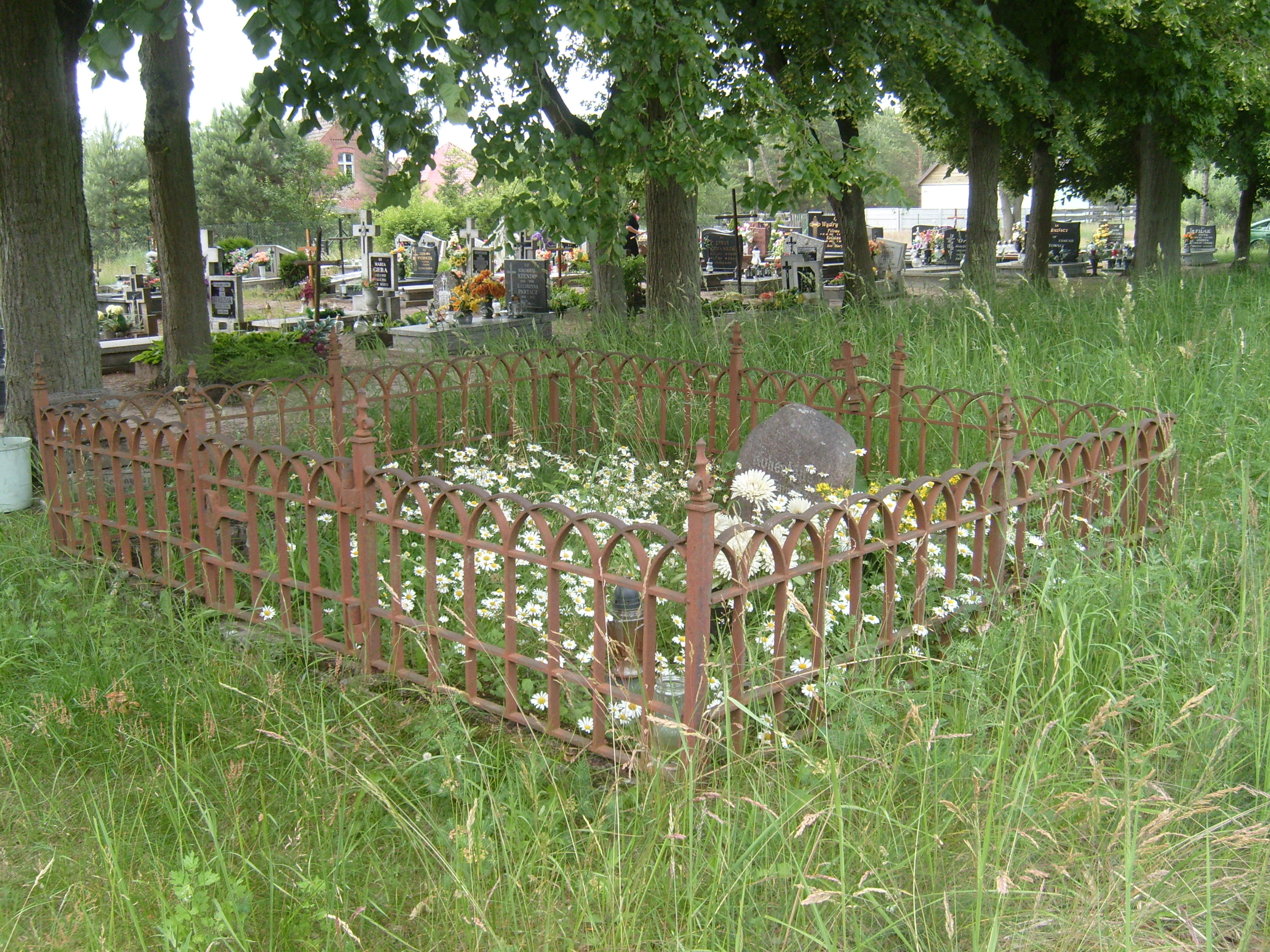
- Cemetery in Kuźnica Żelichowska

- Location within Poland
- Coordinates: 52°58′41″N 16°4′54″E
- Country: Poland
- Voivodeship: Greater Poland
- County: Czarnków-Trzcianka
- Gmina: Krzyż Wielkopolski
- Time zone: UTC+1 (CET)
  - Summer (DST): UTC+2 (CEST)
- Postal code: 64-763
- Vehicle registration: PCT

Kuźnica Żelichowska (Polish: [kuʑˈɲit͡sa ʐɛliˈxɔfska]; German: Selchowhammer) is a village in the administrative district of Gmina Krzyż Wielkopolski, within Czarnków-Trzcianka County, Greater Poland Voivodeship, in west-central Poland.

== History ==
Kuźnica Żelichowska was a private village of Polish nobility, administratively located in the Poznań County in the Poznań Voivodeship in the Greater Poland Province of the Kingdom of Poland. It was annexed by Prussia in the First Partition of Poland in 1772, and from 1871 it was also part of Germany, within which the Polish population was subjected to Germanisation policies. During the final stages of World War II, on January 28, 1945, the retreating Germans committed a massacre of six Italian generals (Giuseppe Andreoli, Emanuele Balbo Bertone, Ugo Ferrero, Carlo Spatocco, Alberto Trionfi, Alessandro Vaccaneo) during a German-perpetrated death march of prisoners of war. After the German withdrawal, the massacred Italians were buried by local Poles. The village returned to Poland.
