= Skoki =

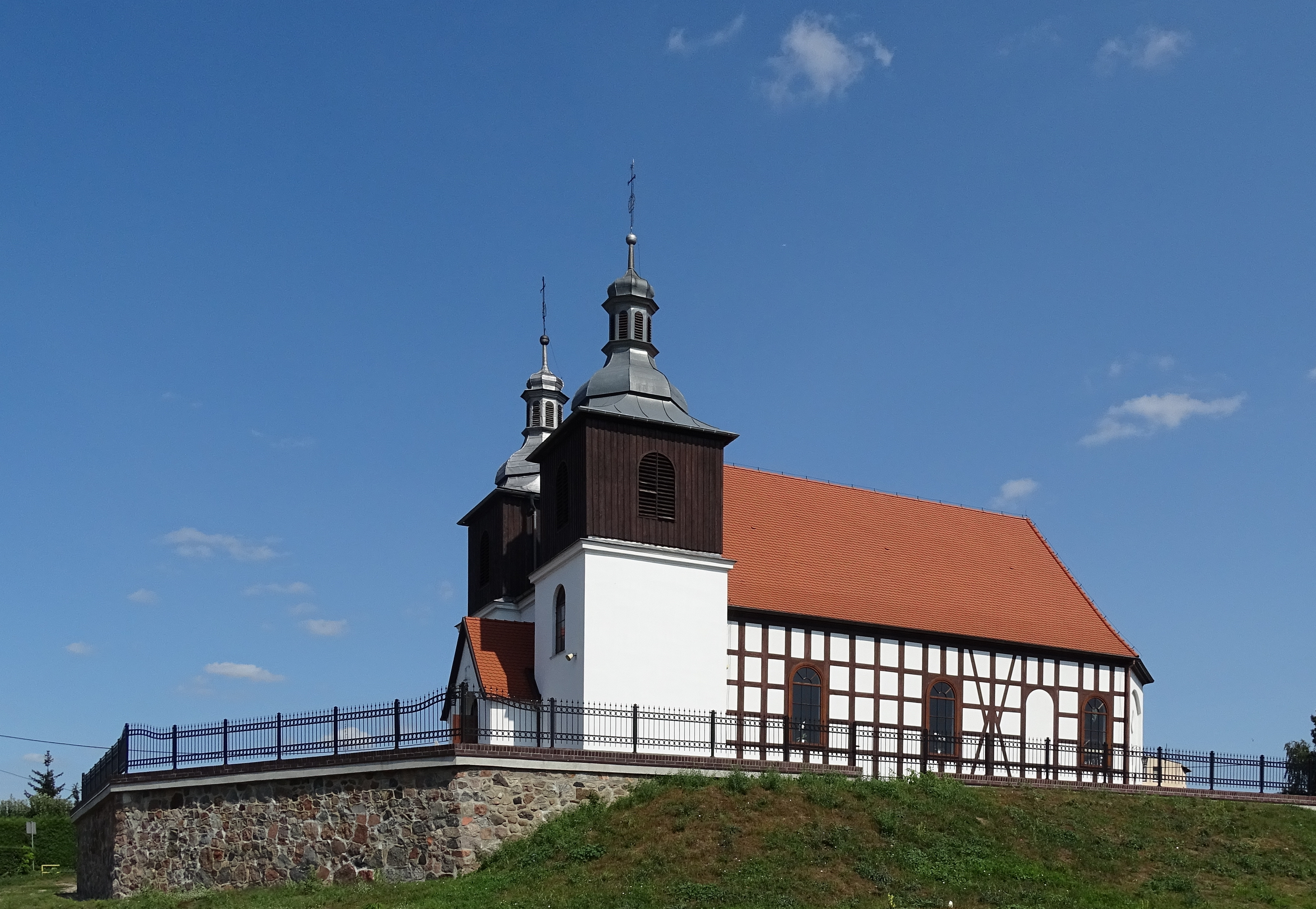
- Church of Saint Nicholas from 1737

- Flag Coat of arms

- Location within Poland
- Coordinates: 52°40′N 17°9′E
- Country: Poland
- Voivodeship: Greater Poland
- County: Wągrowiec
- Gmina: Skoki

Area
  - Total: 11.2 km^{2} (4.3 sq mi)

Population (2010)
  - Total: 4,003
  - Density: 357/km^{2} (926/sq mi)
- Time zone: UTC+1 (CET)
  - Summer (DST): UTC+2 (CEST)
- Vehicle registration: PWA
- Primary airport: Poznań–Ławica Airport
- Website: http://gmina-skoki.pl

Skoki ([ˈskɔkʲi]; German: Schokken) is a town in Poland, Greater Poland Voivodeship, Wągrowiec County, with 4,003 inhabitants (2010). It is located about 40 km north of Poznań. It is the seat of the administrative district (gmina) called Gmina Skoki.

== History ==
Established in 1367, it has always been a town with handicraft, in particular cloth weaving up to the 19th century. It was a private town of Polish nobility, administratively located in the Gniezno County in the Kalisz Voivodeship in the Greater Poland Province of the Kingdom of Poland. The town's coat of arms comes from the Lubicz coat of arms of local Polish nobility.

During the joint German-Soviet invasion of Poland, which began World War II in September 1939, the town was invaded and then occupied by Germany until 1945. It was annexed directly into Nazi Germany and made part of the newly formed province of Reichsgau Wartheland. In September 1940, the Germans established the Oflag XXI-A prisoner-of-war camp for French officers, however, in 1941 it was relocated to Babruysk. In Skoki the occupiers then founded the Oflag XXI-C POW camp for Polish officers in March 1942, which in 1943 was relocated to Ostrzeszów.

== Demographics ==
Historical population

Year	Pop.	±%
1843	1,227	—
1871	1,330	+8.4%
1880	1,386	+4.2%
1890	1,374	−0.9%
1900	1,284	−6.6%
1910	1,378	+7.3%

Year	Pop.	±%
1921	1,431	+3.8%
1931	1,788	+24.9%
1939	1,870	+4.6%
1950	1,536	−17.9%
1960	2,499	+62.7%
2010	4,003	+60.2%

Historical population by religion/ethnicity

- 1800: 857, of whom 519 were Christian (partly Polish) and 338 were Jewish
- 1816: 906
- 1843: 1227
- 1861: 1225
- 1885: 1374, of whom 496 were Evangelical, 687 were Catholic, and 191 were Jewish

== Sights ==
In the town, there is a palace which is now part of the University of Fine Arts in Poznań, and a church which lies on the Wooden Churches Trail around Puszcza Zielonka.

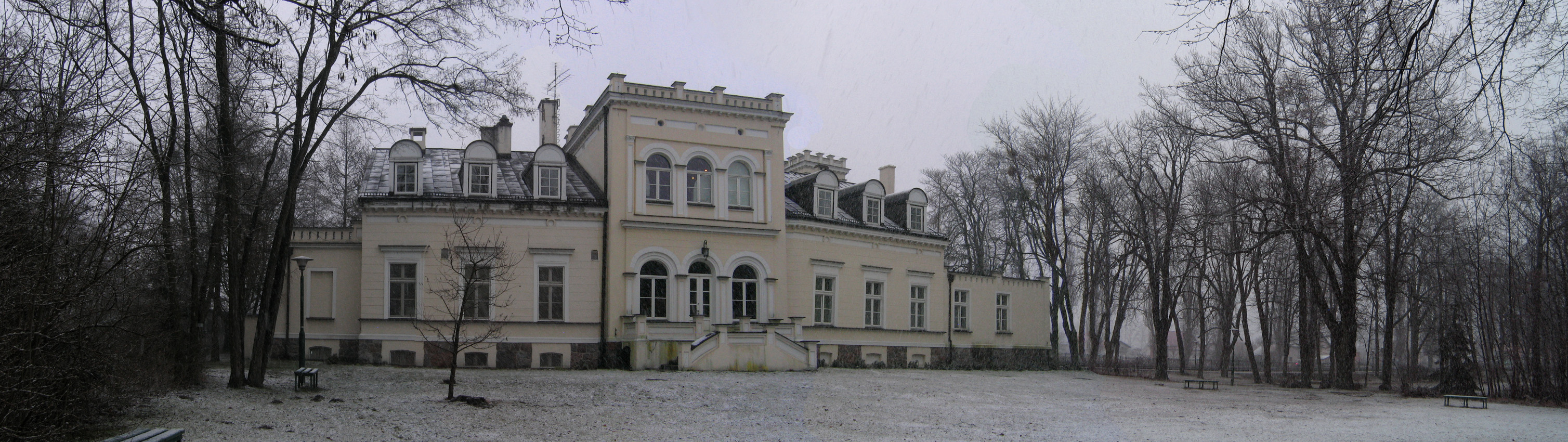
Skoki Palace in winter

== Sports ==
The local football club is Wełna Skoki.
