= Operation Achse =

1943 German campaign to disarm Italy following its armistice to the Allies during WWII

- Part of the Italian campaign of World War II
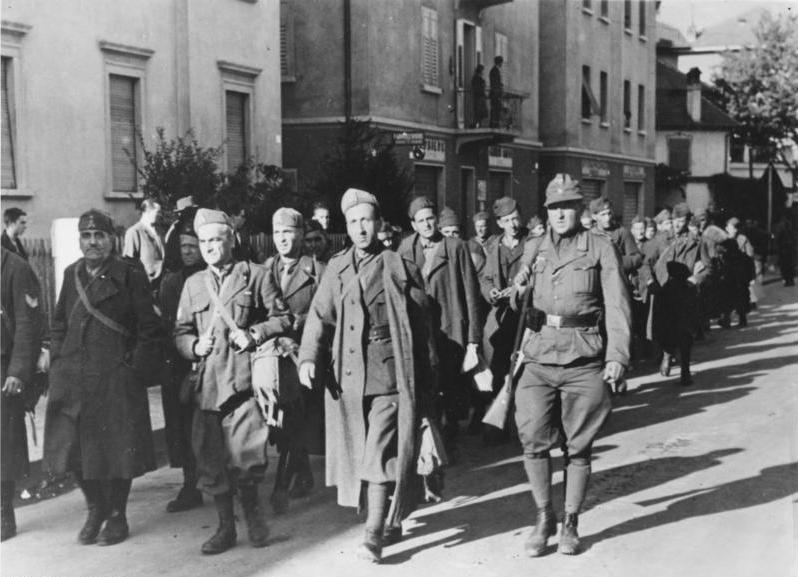
- Disarmed Italian soldiers marching to captivity in Bozen.
Date	8–23 September 1943
Location	Italy, Balkans, Southern France
Result	Axis victory
Territorial changes	German occupation of northern and central Italy; Establishment of the Italian Social Republic

Belligerents
Italy	Germany; Croatia; Romania

Commanders and leaders
(Kingdom of Italy) Victor Emmanuel III (Kingdom of Italy) Pietro Badoglio (Kingdom of Italy) Vittorio Ambrosio (Kingdom of Italy) Mario Roatta (Kingdom of Italy) Ezio Rosi (POW) (Kingdom of Italy) Mario Vercellino (POW)	(Nazi Germany) Albert Kesselring (Nazi Germany) Erwin Rommel (Nazi Germany) Gerd von Rundstedt (Nazi Germany) Maximilian von Weichs (Nazi Germany) Alexander Löhr (Independent State of Croatia) Miroslav Navratil (Kingdom of Romania) Horia Macellariu

Strength
60 divisions (26 in Italy, 31 in the Balkans, 3 in France)	40 divisions (17 in Italy, 19 in the Balkans, 4 in France)

Casualties and losses
20,000–30,000 killed 1,006,370 disarmed Captured by Germans: 977 armored vehicles 16,631 vehicles 17,058 artillery pieces and mortars Many warships Captured by Romanians: 496 prisoners 5 midget submarines	Unknown

Operation Achse (German: Fall Achse, lit. 'Case Axis'), originally called Operation Alaric (Unternehmen Alarich), was the German operation to forcibly disarm the Italian armed forces after Italy's armistice with the Allies on 3 September 1943.

Several German divisions had entered Italy after the fall of Benito Mussolini in July 1943, while Italy was officially still an ally of Germany, despite the protests of the new Italian government under Pietro Badoglio. The armistice was made public on 8 September. German forces moved rapidly to take over the Italian zones of occupation in the Balkans and southern France, and to disarm Italian forces in Italy.

Some Italian troops, with no orders from superiors, and hampered by desertions, resisted the Germans. On the Greek island of Cephalonia, 1,315 Italian soldiers were killed in action against the Germans and over 5,100 Italian soldiers from the 33rd Infantry Division "Acqui" were summarily executed by the German Army after running out of ammunition and surrendering. In Rome, with the royal family and the government having fled, a disorganized defense by Italian troops of the capital was unable to withstand a German attack. Some individual soldiers and sometimes whole units, like the 24th Infantry Division "Pinerolo" in Thessaly, went over to the local resistance. Only in Sardinia, Corsica, Calabria and the southern part of Apulia were Italian troops able to offer successful resistance and hold off the Germans until relieved by the arrival of the Allies.

== German plan ==
The first German combat units were sent to Italy to bolster its defenses against a probable Allied attack on Italian soil. Germany and Italy were still allies. The decision to create German units in Italy was made during the final phase of the Tunisian campaign; on 9 May 1943, two days after the fall of Tunis to the Allies, the German High Command (OKW) informed the Italian Supreme Command (Comando Supremo) that three new German units would be formed, mostly employing second-line German units evacuated from North Africa. They would be the Sardinia Command (later 90th Light Infantry Division), the Sicily Command (later 15th Infantry Division), and a "ready reserve". Adolf Hitler wrote to a dubious Benito Mussolini that since they were weak units that needed reinforcements, two additional German divisions would be sent from France. The 1st Fallschirm-Panzer Division Hermann Göring arrived mid-May 1943 and was sent to Sicily, and the 16th Panzer Division arrived in early June and was sent west of Bari. On 19 May also, the headquarters of general Hans Hube's XIV Panzer Corps was also sent from France to strengthen the command structure of the Commander-in-Chief South (Oberbefehlshaber Süd), Field Marshal Albert Kesselring.

On 20 May 1943, during a prolonged discussion at his headquarters, Hitler expressed his doubts about the political stability of the Fascist government and the danger of a collapse of his Italian ally. A report by the German diplomat Konstantin von Neurath found declining morale among the Italian population and pro-British sentiment spreading through the professional classes and the military. Hitler was convinced that the situation in the Mediterranean needed great attention, and a detailed plan had to be prepared for a collapse of Italy or an overthrow of Mussolini. More reports about a speech delivered by the Italian diplomat Giuseppe Bastianini, information from Heinrich Himmler's men in Italy and the presence in Sicily of General Mario Roatta, who was considered untrustworthy, strengthened Hitler's suspicions.

On 21 May, Field Marshal Wilhelm Keitel, the head of the OKW, issued guidelines developed to respond to the possible defection of Italy from the Axis. The plan envisioned a series of operations in different theaters: Operation Alarich, the invasion of the Italian mainland; Operation Konstantin, the neutralization of the Italian forces in the Balkans; Operation Siegfried, occupation of the Italian-occupied areas in Southern France; Operation Nürnberg, to guard the France–Spain border; Operation Kopenhagen, to control the passes on the France–Italy border.

Meanwhile, German reserves kept being redeployed to face potential threats in the Mediterranean theater. Hitler, seriously worried about the Balkans and in conflict with the Italian leadership and Mussolini himself because of collaboration agreements between the Italian and local partisan forces, decided to send the 1st Panzer Division to the Peloponnese and even considered sending to Italy his three elite Waffen-SS armored divisions, then deployed on the Eastern Front for Operation Citadel.

On 17 June Mussolini, after a partial refusal, urgently asked for two German armoured divisions, as a reinforcement to confront the powerful Allied forces. After more arguments caused by another change of mind by Mussolini and by a proposal by General Vittorio Ambrosio, the Chief of Staff of the Italian armed forces, to turn down German reinforcements and to move to Italy the Italian troops deployed in France and the Balkans, the ever-deteriorating situation (during Operation Corkscrew, Pantelleria surrendered without resistance on 11 June) induced Hitler to send three more German divisions: the 3rd Panzergrenadier Division, the 29th Panzergrenadier Division (both newly reconstituted in France after their decimation at Stalingrad), and the 26th Panzer Division. The last of them was deployed at Salerno on 9 July. The 29th Panzergrenadier Division was sent to Foggia in mid-June and the 3rd Panzergrenadier Division was deployed north of Rome in the first days of July. Meanwhile, on 24 June, the Reichsführer-SS Brigade had been moved to Corsica, and in mid-July, the command of the 76th Panzerkorps (General Traugott Herr) also arrived.

== Transfer of German forces to Italy ==
=== From the invasion of Sicily to the fall of Fascism ===
The Allied invasion of Sicily began on 10 July 1943, and established solid beachheads, despite Italian and German counterattacks. The political and military leaders of the two countries reacted immediately to the worsening situation. In Rome, Ambrosio urged unrealistic demands for help from Germany on Mussolini. Among the German commanders in Italy, Eberhard von Mackensen and Albert Kesselring became increasingly skeptical about Italian defense capabilities, and asked for reinforcements.

Hitler, more and more worried about an Italian collapse, decided to send the 1st Fallschirmjäger-Division to Sicily immediately, and then sent the headquarters of XIV Panzer Corps (General Hans Hube) and the 29th Panzergrenadier Division, ready for deployment, to Reggio Calabria. On 17 July, Hitler decided to meet with Mussolini and his collaborators, and assess their resolve to continue the war.

The meeting was near Feltre on 19 July 1943. On the same day, Rome was attacked by 690 bombers of the USAAF, which accelerated maneuvers by monarchists, high military officers, and even part of the Fascist leadership, more and more concerned with finding a way out of the war. The Feltre meeting accomplished little. Despite pleas by Ambrosio to present Italy's critical situation clearly and to ask for freedom of action to withdraw from the war, Mussolini was weak and indecisive and only asked for more German help in the defense of Italy, while Hitler made an exhausting speech in favor of fighting till the end. Moreover, Hitler gave an optimistic view of the situation and refused the sweeping Italian requests for more land and air support, mentioning technical and operative difficulties. But also, he did not heed the vehement requests of Jodl, Keitel and Warlimont: to create a unified command in Italy under German control, to move the many Italian troops in northern Italy south (towards the regions attacked by the Allies), and to give command of the Axis forces in the theatre to General Wolfram von Richthofen.

After the meeting, Hitler was convinced that he had lifted Mussolini's morale. Field Marshal Erwin Rommel had been put in charge of forces being organized in Bavaria for intervention in case of Italy's defection ("Operation Alaric"). Rommel was worried about the fate of German troops in Sicily and southern Italy, who would be cut off from Germany by an Italian "betrayal". But Hitler ignored warnings from Rommel. On 21 July, Hitler decided to suspend the planning of "Alaric" and to send German reinforcements to Italy. The codename "Alaric" was later quietly changed to "Achse" to avoid offending the Italians (Alaric was the Visigothic king who sacked Rome in 410).

On 25 July, before he learned of the fall of Mussolini, Hitler sent six Heer (Army) divisions to Italy, including a Panzer division, and three Waffen-SS divisions. Rommel and his headquarters (then in Munich) were sent to Thessaloniki to control a new army group in the Balkans.

=== German countermeasures after 25 July ===
Hitler and the German leadership were thus taken by surprise by the fall of Mussolini on 25 July; due to wrong information from the ambassador Hans Georg von Mackensen and by the military attaché Enno von Rintelen, who did not foresee that the meeting of the Grand Council of Fascism would threaten the Fascist regime, and instead thought that Mussolini would be able to strengthen collaboration with Nazi Germany. The news of the fall of Mussolini and the creation of a military government led by Marshal Pietro Badoglio surprised and enraged Hitler, who immediately understood that, despite assurances by Badoglio and Italian diplomats, the change of regime was a prelude to an Italian defection, which would endanger the German forces fighting in Southern Italy and the entire Wehrmacht presence in Southern Europe.

At first Hitler thought about intervening immediately with the forces already on site to occupy Rome and arrest Badoglio, the king and the members of the new government; however he soon changed his mind and, together with Jodl and Rommel (who had been urgently recalled from Greece) he decided to re-activate the planning of Operation "Alarich", to create a detailed plan to react to the Italian defection and swiftly occupy the Italian Peninsula, after sending enough reinforcements. Kesselring was told to be ready to change sides and to prepare the withdrawal of his forces from Sicily, Sardinia and Southern Italy; new directives were issued, with new operational plans.

In a matter of few days, the "Siegfried", "Konstantin", and "Kopenhagen" plans (ready since May) were confirmed, and new operations were studied: "Schwartz" to capture the Italian government in Rome, "Achse" to capture the Italian fleet, "Eiche" to free Mussolini from captivity, and "Student" to capture Rome. On 28 July, Hitler reviewed the operational planning: the "Konstantin" and "Alarich" plans were combined into a single plan for the occupation of Italy and the Balkans, which was called "Achse". On 5 August, on the advice of Admiral Ruge and because of the strengthening of the Italian defenses of Rome, the "Schwartz" plan was abandoned. Another problem for Hitler and the German leadership came from a lack of detailed information about Mussolini's fate and the refusal of Victor Emmanuel III to meet Hitler, which would have been an occasion for a sudden attack on the new Italian leadership.

While the planning was under way, the Wehrmacht command had begun the transfer of the divisions needed to enact operations when the Italians defected. Starting on 27 July, the 2. Fallschirmjäger-Division of General Hermann-Bernhard Ramcke was moved by air from Southern France to the Pratica di Mare Air Base, a move that surprised both the Italian commands and Kesselring, as neither had been warned beforehand. Meanwhile, on 31 July, General Kurt Student (commander of the 11th Airborne Corps, and due to take command of Ramcke's paratroopers) and SS-Hauptsturmführer Otto Skorzeny reached Kesselring in Frascati and outlined the "Schwarz" plan for him. This was however soon cancelled by Hitler.

Meanwhile, at 12:00 on 26 July Rommel had returned from Thessaloniki to Rastenburg, leaving command of the new Army Group F to Field Marshal von Weichs, and on 29 July he assumed command in Munich of a fake command, denominated Auffrischungsstab München, to hide the creation of a new army group which on 14 August would be moved to Bologna under the name of Army Group B, and would enact Operation "Achse" in Northern Italy.

At 02:15 on 26 July the 215th Infantry Division was the first German unit to enter Italy, heading for Liguria, while the Panzergrenadier Division Feldherrnhalle and the 715th Infantry Division were deployed to protect the passage through the alpine passes on the French–Italian border. The Italian commands protested and tried to stop the inflow of the divisions with some pretexts, but Kesselring intervened through the Italian Supreme Command on 1 August, and the 305th Infantry Division marched on foot first to Genoa and then to La Spezia. Meanwhile, more German units entered Italy: the 76th Infantry Division, on 2 August, heading for Savona; the 94th Infantry Division, on 4 August, heading for Susa and then Alessandria; the 87th Corps headquarters (General Gustav-Adolf von Zangen), which on 11 August established itself in Acqui and assumed command of the three newly-arrived German divisions.

Some conflicts and incidents between the German troops on passage and the Italian commands and units took place also at the Brenner Pass; Rommel, worried by the news of a strengthening of the Italian garrison and mining of the mountain passes, sent the Kampfgruppe Feuerstein south, with part of the 26th Panzer Division and the 44th Infantry Division, with orders to say that they had been sent to help Italy against the common enemy. The Italian Supreme Command in Rome and General Gloria, commander of the XXVI Italian Army Corps in Bolzano, complained vehemently and threatened an armed reaction, but after Kesselring's intervention on 1 August the crisis passed and the German units were allowed to proceed; the 44th Infantry Division reached Bozen, assumed control of the Brenner Pass and thus ensured the transalpine communications with Germany.

Right after July 25, Hitler had initially decided to immediately send to Italy the 1st SS Panzer Division Leibstandarte SS Adolf Hitler and the 2nd SS Panzer Division Das Reich, despite the precarious situation on the Eastern Front. Protests by Field Marshal Von Kluge and further worsening of the situation in the East forced Hitler to send only the Leibstandarte Adolf Hitler, without its heavy weapons. This division crossed the Brenner Pass on 3 August and then placed itself between Parma and Reggio Emilia. This was soon followed by the transfer of the 65th Infantry Division from Villach to the Ravenna–Rimini area, and the transfer of the 24th Panzer Division from Tyrol to Modena by 30 August. On 3 August the Waffen-SS Generaloberst Paul Hausser arrived in Reggio Emilia with the headquarters of the II SS Panzer Corps, to take command of the three incoming divisions.

The last German division to enter Italy was the 71st Infantry Division, which was transferred from Denmark to an area north of Ljubljana on 7 August, and from 25 August started entering Friuli on orders from Rommel, who feared possible hostile actions by the Italians and the mining of the Eastern alpine passes. After another conflict with the Italian Supreme Command, which once again menaced to result in armed clashes, the situation was solved by the intervention of Enno von Rintelen and the division advanced without problems towards Gemona, Gorizia, and Opicina; by 2 September it was fully deployed in the Julian March.

== 8 September 1943 ==
=== End of an alliance ===
Right after the removal of Mussolini from power, the new government led by Badoglio had officially proclaimed the decision to continue the war alongside Germany and kept reassuring the German leadership of its loyalty to the Axis cause, but at the same time it started a series of confused attempts to start secret negotiations with the Allies, to get out of the war and to avoid the consequences of a sudden change of sides. The need to gain time induced the new Italian government to make a show of loyalty to the alliance, asking for a more active participation of the German ally in the defense of the Italian Peninsula and thus for the arrival of more German divisions, which however worsened the German threat to Italy.

The Italian leadership tried to keep a grip on this difficult phase by alternating requests for help and obstructionism towards the incoming German forces and requests to deploy the German divisions in the South, on the frontline; already on 31 July, during the meeting between Ambrosio and Kesselring, arguments began about the positioning and role of the new German divisions. At the conference held in Tarvisio on 6 August between the Italian Foreign Minister Raffaele Guariglia, Ambrosio, Joachim von Ribbentrop and Keitel (with the menacing presence of SS guards), the mutual distrust became apparent; Ambrosio asked to increase the German divisions from nine to sixteen, but to deploy them in Southern Italy against the Allies, while Keitel and Warlimont instead stated that the new German units would be deployed in Central and Northern Italy, as a strategic reserve force.

A last meeting was held in Bologna on 15 August, between generals Roatta and Jodl, the latter accompanied by Rommel (who had just been made commander of the new Army Group B in Northern Italy) and by a SS guard of the Leibstandarte Adolf Hitler; the Germans consented to recalling to Italy part of the 4th Italian Army from Southern France, but they were alarmed by Roatta's plans about a positioning of the German forces that, in case of defection, seemed to expose them to the risk of becoming isolated and being destroyed by the Allies. The meeting was a failure and convinced the German generals that, despite reassurances from Roatta (possibly not yet informed by Ambrosio of the contacts that were under way with the Allies), who assured that Italy would not defect and added "we are not Saxons!", that an Italian defection was imminent. The atmosphere at the meeting was so tense that the German delegation refused food and beverages offered by the Italians, fearing they might be poisoned.

The preparations against an Italian betrayal therefore proceeded swiftly; detailed dispositions were issued to the subordinated commands, which in turn studied detailed operative plans to act with speed and efficiency. The German leadership expected only weak resistance by the Italian armed forces and counted on quickly solving the situation. General Von Horstig, a representative of the weaponry office of the Wehrmacht in Italy, was already preparing plans for the plunder of the resources and the systematic destruction of factories and infrastructures of military importance in Southern Italy. At the end of August, Hitler sent to Italy his new representatives: the diplomat Rudolf Rahn (who replaced the ambassador Von Mackensen) and General Rudolf Toussaint, who replaced Von Rintelen as military attaché.

Kesselring had already authorized General Hans Hube (XIV Panzer Corps), on orders from OKW, to organize the withdrawal of his four divisions from Sicily and its redeployment in Calabria, which Hube skilfully carried out on 17 August (Operation Lehrgang). The vast majority of the German troops in Sicily, after an effective fighting retreat, managed to cross the Straits of Messina and even to save a great part of their heavy equipment. In the following days Hube deployed the XIV Panzer Corps (16th Panzer Division, 15th Panzergrenadier Division, and Hermann Goring Division) in the area between Naples and Salerno, while the 1st Parachute Division was sent to Apulia and General Herr with the 76th Panzerkorps assumed the defense of Calabria, with part of the 26th Panzer Division and the 29th Panzergrenadier Division; his orders were to carry out delaying actions in case of Allied attack across the straits. On 3 September, XIII Corps of the Eighth Army (General Bernard Montgomery) crossed the straits northwest of Reggio Calabria (Operation Baytown), landed without meeting much resistance and started a cautious advance along the coastal roads towards Pizzo Calabro and Crotone. The 76th Panzerkorps avoided engagement and slowly retreated northwards, conducting demolitions as it went.

=== The armistice ===
After some unrealistic and fruitless attempts by personalities of minor importance (embassy official Blasco Lanza D'Ajeta, Foreign Ministry official Alberto Berio, industrialist Alberto Pirelli) to contact the Allies and start negotiations for an exit of Italy from the war, possibly avoiding the dangerous consequences of a surrender at discretion and a German occupation, on 12 August General Giuseppe Castellano, Ambrosio's counselor, left Rome for Madrid, where he met the British ambassador Sir Samuel Hoare. The latter informed Churchill and then directed Castellano to Lisbon where, on 17 August, the first meeting with the Allied emissaries, General Walter Bedell Smith and political advisers Kenneth Strong and George F. Kennan, took place. The Allies' demands, definitively established by the Allied governments at the end of July, called for a completely unconditional surrender; Castellano thus found himself in great hindrance, as the instructions Badoglio had given him required to bargain the exit of Italy from the war and a strong military collaboration with the Allies, including the intervention of as many as fifteen British and American divisions that were to make contemporaneous landings north and south of Rome simultaneously with the announcement of the armistice, in order to defend the capital and deal with the German reaction. During a new meeting between Castellano and Bedell Smith in Cassibile, Sicily, on 31 August, the Italian envoy unsuccessfully insisted again to be made a part of the Allied operative details; the intervention of an American airborne division to protect Rome and the Italian government (Operation Giant 2) was agreed. On 1 September, after a consultation between the king, Guariglia and Ambrosio, the Allies were radioed the reception of the conditions of the armistice.

On 3 September, Castellano and Bedell Smith therefore signed the Armistice of Cassibile, in presence of the representatives of the British and American governments, Harold Macmillan and Robert Daniel Murphy; there was however a grievous mistake about the timing of the announcement of the Italian surrender. The Badoglio government hoped to gain more time to organize the resistance against the German forces, delaying the announcement at least till 12 September. Only in the night of 8 September did Badoglio learn from General Maxwell Taylor (the second-in-command of the 82nd Airborne Division, whose intervention was planned for "Giant 2", who had been secretly sent to Rome) that General Dwight Eisenhower would make the announcement that very evening. Badoglio protested and vainly tried to obtain another delay; the Italian leaders and generals, extremely worried about the German reaction, made an awful impression on General Taylor, who advised the Allied command to give up Operation "Giant 2", which he deemed to be destined to fail, given the disorganization of the sizable Italian forces stationed around Rome.

In the morning of 8 September, the Allied bombers attacked Kesselring's headquarters in Frascati. While they failed their objective and caused heavy civilian casualties, the Allied fleets approached the Gulf of Salerno to launch Operation Avalanche (the main landing of the 5th American Army of General Mark W. Clark). Badoglio, more and more anxious, sent Eisenhower a telegram asking for a deferment of the announcement of the armistice. The Allied commander-in-chief, sustained by an order from Washington of the Allied heads of state, firmly rejected the request, confirmed his intentions in a threatening tone, and cancelled Operation "Giant 2".

At 18:00 on 8 September a hurried and dramatic Council of the Crown was held at the Quirinale Palace; the king, Badoglio, Ambrosio, Guariglia, General Giacomo Carboni (head of the Servizio Informazioni Militare (Military Intelligence) and commander of the Motorized-Armored Army Corps, defending the capital, General Antonio Sorice (War Minister), Admiral Raffaele de Courten (Minister of the Navy), General Renato Sandalli (Minister of the Air Force), General Paolo Puntoni, General Giuseppe De Stefanis, and Major Luigi Marchesi (secretary of Ambrosio) participated. Faced with the clear instructions transmitted by Eisenhower and the first indiscretions leaking on foreign radios about the armistice, the Italian leadership, after heated discussions where Carboni went as far as to propose that they retracted Castellano's actions, finally agreed with Marchesi, who said that they should unavoidably keep the word they had given to the Allies, and confirm the news. At 18:30 General Eisenhower, speaking on Radio Algiers, officially announced the armistice, and at 19:42 the Badoglio Proclamation was broadcast via the state broadcaster EIAR. During the previous days, the German representatives in Rome had been given reiterated statements of loyalty to the alliance, expressed at the highest levels; on 3 September Badoglio himself had confirmed to Rahn his firm will to remain at the side of Germany, and still on 6 September General Toussaint thought that the Italians had rejected the harsh demands of the Allies. Even in the morning of 8 September, Rahn met the king and the latter reassured him about his decision not to surrender, and in the afternoon Roatta reaffirmed by telephone that news coming from abroad were a propagandist hoax. Rahn was thus taken by surprise when at 19:00 on 8 September, having been warned by Berlin about the news of the armistice, he met Guariglia whom immediately confirmed the news and told him about the exit of Italy from the war and from the Axis alliance. Rahn replied bitterly, then hastily left Rome along with Toussaint and the embassy personnel and went to Frascati, where Kesselring's headquarters were located.

Despite the initial surprise, the German response, having been accurately planned and organized in detail, was swift and effective; Hitler, who at 17:00 came back to Rastenburg after spending a few days in Ukraine at the headquarters of Field Marshal Erich von Manstein, soon learned of the armistice from a BBC transmission, and acted with extreme resolve. At 19:50, a few minutes after Badoglio had finished his announcement, the aide of General Jodl broadcast the coded word "Achse" to all subordinated commands; it was the signal for the German forces to attack Italian forces in all the war theaters of the Mediterranean.

== Dissolution of Italian forces in Italy ==
=== Uncertainty and confusion ===
The Italian high commands, in the weeks leading to the armistice, had issued instructions for commanders and troops about their behaviour in case of a withdrawal from the war and possible German aggressions; these orders were Order No. 111 issued by the Staff of the Italian Army on 10 August, the OP 44 Memorandum issued on 26 August by General Mario Roatta (on Ambrosio's orders) to the major peripheral commands (only twelve copies), and the No. 1 and No. 2 Memorandums issued on 6 September by the Supreme Command to the Staffs of the three armed forces, containing indications about the deployment of the forces in the theaters of operations.

These were however general guidelines, lacking details and nearly inapplicable (also due to excessive secrecy measures); they were ineffective and they contributed, along with the vagueness of Badoglio's message on the evening of 8 September, to the confusion of the peripheral commands of the Italian forces about the unexpected news of the change of sides and the aggressiveness of the German forces, thus resulting in insecurity and indecision among those commands. The situation of the Italian armed forces was worsened by the contradictory instructions issued by Ambrosio in the evening of 8 September, which restricted any initiative to mere defensive measures in case of German attacks, and by Roatta in the night of 9 September, who especially demanded to avoid turmoil and 'seditions' among the troops.

Faced with the efficiency of the German units, which immediately demanded surrender or collaboration with threats and intimidations, most of the Italian commanders, also fearful of the impressive reputation of military capacity of the Wehrmacht and many times tired by a lengthy and disliked war, soon abandoned any intent of resistance; with a few exceptions, the troops, left with neither orders nor leaders, often dispersed.

The situation of the German forces in Italy was actually a difficult one; Rommel, with his Army Group B, had the easier task of occupying the northern regions and neutralizing any resistance by Italian forces in that area, but Kesselring, in command of Army Group C, was in great difficulty after September 8: after the bombing of Frascati, he barely managed to receive the communication of the coded word "Achse" and also learned of the Allied landing near Salerno, where only part of the 16th Panzer Division was stationed. At first, he feared that he would not be able to simultaneously contain the Allied advance and carry out his mission against Rome.

Even the OKW considered the possibility of losing the eight German divisions in Southern Italy; Kesselring, however, showed great capability, and his forces fought with ability and effectiveness. Despite advice by Rommel to quickly withdraw from Southern Italy and retreat to the La Spezia–Rimini line, Kesselring managed to avoid the isolation and destruction of his forces and also to cause trouble to the Allied bridgehead at Salerno, to counterattack with some success (after massing there the 14th and 76th Panzerkorps, with three Panzer divisions and two Panzergrenadier divisions) and then to retreat with minimal losses north of Naples, while simultaneously carrying out Achse and capturing Rome with part of his forces.

=== Fall of Rome ===
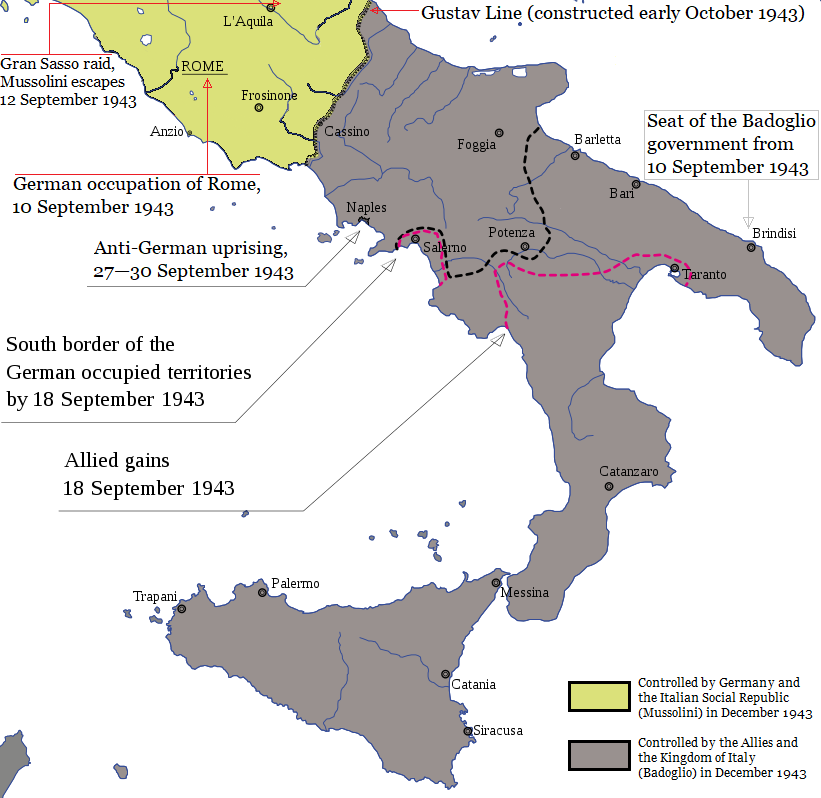
Italian military situation in September 1943

In order to defend the political and military leadership and to resist a possible German attack, Italian commanders had concentrated a considerable number of troops in the area around Rome; the main force consisted in the Motorized-Armored Army Corps (General Giacomo Carboni) composed of:

- 10th Infantry Division "Piave"
- 21st Infantry Division "Granatieri di Sardegna"
- 135th Armored Cavalry Division "Ariete"
- 136th Armored Legionary Division "Centauro"

Other units tasked with the defense of Rome were

- the 12th Infantry Division "Sassari" and
- the 103rd Infantry Division "Piacenza" (part of the XVII Italian Army Corps of General Giovanni Zangheri),
- some battalions of the 13th Infantry Division "Re" and 7th Infantry Division "Lupi di Toscana"

Overall, about 55,000 men and 200 armored fighting vehicles protected Rome and outnumbered the German forces in the area.

The German forces near Rome consisted in the 11th Airborne Corps of General Kurt Student, headquartered in Pratica di Mare; the Corps comprised the 2nd Parachute Division under General Walter Barenthin, ready for action south of Rome, and the 3rd Panzergrenadier Division (General Fritz-Hubert Gräser), reinforced by an armored battalion of the 26th Panzer Division (Kampfgruppe Büsing), stationed between Orvieto and Lake Bolsena, north of Rome. These units comprised about 26,000 men and some hundreds of armored fighting vehicles, and were activated by Kesselring in the evening of 8 September: already at 20:30 they attacked the Mezzocammino fuel depot, and the German paratroopers immediately started advancing south, overcoming sporadic resistance by the Piacenza Division in Lanuvio, Albano Laziale, and Ardea.

After reaching the EUR district at 21:30, the 2nd Parachute Division overpowered some units of the Piacenza and Granatieri di Sardegna Divisions and after half an hour, advancing along the Via Ostiensis, reached the Magliana bridge. Meanwhile, the 3rd Panzergrenadier Division advanced from north along the Via Aurelia, Via Cassia, and Via Flaminia, but was halted near Lake Bracciano by the Ariete II Division (General Raffaele Cadorna) and suspended its advance after some negotiations. The paratroopers, instead, went ahead with their action; fierce fighting erupted at Magliana between the German forces and the Granatieri di Sardegna, supported by armored units of the Ariete II Division, but at 02:00 on 9 September the Ciampino airport was captured, and an hour later news came that German troops had arrived in Tor Sapienza, along Via Prenestina, just eight km away from the city center.

More and more alarming news pushed the political and military leadership, after some uncertain orders by Ambrosio to try to contact Kesselring, to decide to abandon the city. Roatta exhorted the king and Badoglio to leave Rome by the Via Tiburtina, then he ordered his forces to try to retreat to Tivoli and finally he abandoned the city himself, leaving Carboni without any order. Carboni in turn fled in civilian clothes, then re-entered the city in the morning of 10 September, when the situation was definitely compromised. General Umberto Utili, head of the Operations Division of the General Staff, declared the General Staff as formally dissolved in the morning of 9 September; the subordinate commands and the troops showed signs of bewilderment and confusion.

At 05:10 on 9 September the King and Badoglio, along with high-ranking officers, dignitaries and family members, fled Rome in seven cars; without encountering any difficulties, they passed Tivoli and Avezzano and reached Pescara and later Ortona, where more fleeing officers had gathered. There the King, his relatives, Badoglio, Ambrosio, and Roatta boarded the corvette Baionetta, which reached Brindisi at 14:30 on 10 September, the city having already been reached by Allied troops which had safely landed in Italian-controlled Taranto (the British 1st Airborne Division), Brindisi, and Bari (two divisions of the 5th Corps) during Operation Slapstick.

The defenses of Rome had completely collapsed; in the south, the German paratroopers fought a series of sporadic fights against the Granatieri di Sardegna and units of the Ariete II at Magliana and Cecchignola; at 17:00 on 9 September, Magliana was abandoned by Italian forces and the 2nd Parachutist Division proceeded with its advance, arriving near Porta San Paolo in the evening. In the north, the armored fighting vehicles of the 3rd Panzergrenadier Division had restarted their advance; after fighting against the bulk of the Ariete II, they captured Manziana, Monterosi (at 14:00), and Bracciano (at 17:00), while more German units of the same Division advanced towards Civitavecchia and Kampfgruppe Büsing reached Cesano and La Storta.

At 20:00 the Piave and Ariete II divisions, as they had been ordered, left their positions and retreated towards Tivoli, while units of the Sassari and Re divisions were deployed along the Via Cassia and Via Salaria. The parachutists of Major Walter Gericke, whom had been parachuted at 09:00 over Monterotondo with the task of capturing the Italian Army headquarters (which however had already been abandoned), were engaged in hard fighting, which they ended in success in the evening of 9 September; meanwhile, units of the 2nd Parachute Division attacked Porta San Paolo, two kilometers from Piazza Venezia, held by Granatieri di Sardegna units and groups of civilian volunteers. The German troops, mainly consisting in veterans, overcame this resistance after some fierce fighting, and reached the center of Rome in the morning of 10 September. General Siegfried Westphal, Chief of Staff of Army Group C, had started negotiations with Colonel Giaccone of the Centauro (the former 1st CC.NN. Armored Division "M", composed of blackshirts whose allegiances were highly doubtful, which had led the Italian commands to decide to keep it away from the battle), on instructions from Kesselring and Student, in the evening of 9 September. After a series of threats and an ultimatum, Westphal obtained the capitulation of Rome by the afternoon of 10 September, after discussions with Generals Carboni and Sorice and Marshal Enrico Caviglia, while German artillery was already firing directly inside the city. Westphal promised to spare the city and authorized the creation of a provisional Italian command under General Giorgio Calvi di Bergolo.

This evanescent agreement was soon revoked by the Germans; by 15 September all Italian troops were disarmed, on 23 September Calvi di Bergolo was arrested and the German and RSI forces, under Generals Stahel and Chieli, respectively, assumed control of the city; despite this, they stated that the status of "open city" was maintained. This status was never recognized by the Allies, and the Germans exploited it to use Rome as a key logistic junction for the supplies sent to the frontline.

Meanwhile, the Italian units that had retreated towards Tivoli dissolved; a considerable part of the Sassari and Piacenza divisions and of the 211th Coastal Division escaped capture and crossed the frontline, thus joining the Allies, but most of the men of the ten Italian divisions in the area were disarmed. Only a small part of them, however, were interned or deported; the majority was allowed to return to their homes. Overall German casualties for the capture of Rome were about a hundred dead and about 500 wounded, while Italian casualties were 984 killed, of whom 659 were soldiers, 121 civilians, and 204 "unidentified".

=== Disintegration of Italian forces in southern Italy ===
Field Marshal Kesselring, despite being busy with avoiding the isolation of his forces and containing the Allied attacks launched in three different landing areas (Salerno, Apulia and Calabria), still managed to retain control of the situation and to carry out the tasks assigned within the "Achse" plan. He managed to quickly dissolve the Italian forces stationed in his area, to capture Rome, and to disengage mobile units that were to be sent south against the Allies (the 3rd Panzergrenadier Division, after capturing Rome, reached Salerno on 12 September), but he had to restrict himself to summarily disarming the majority of the captured soldiers, then sending them back to their homes. Only 24,294 of the 102,340 Italian soldiers captured by Army Group C were held captive.

Italian forces in Campania were weak and were quickly overwhelmed by the German troops; the Naples garrison was destroyed after two days of resistance by a German armored column, and its commander, Colonel Olivier, was executed. The XIX Italian Army Corps was dissolved on 11 September after its commander, General Del Tetto, abandoned his command post to take shelter in a monastery; the 9th Infantry Division "Pasubio" (stationed in the Naples area), which was still being re-formed after its near destruction on the Eastern Front, was immediately disarmed, while in the Salerno area the 222nd Coastal Division was attacked and dispersed by the 16th Panzer Division, and its commander, General Ferrante Vincenzo Gonzaga, was killed after refusing to surrender.

The 7th Italian Army of General Mario Arisio was stationed in Calabria, Basilicata and Apulia; German forces in these regions were scarce, and were being moved north. On 9 September, the 7th Army headquarters in Potenza were attacked by surprise and captured by German troops, but the overall weakness of the German forces and the swift intervention of the Allied forces helped the Italian units, the majority of whom maintained unit cohesion. The IX Italian Army Corps (General Roberto Lerici) held central and northern Apulia, despite the collapse of the 209th Coastal Division; General Nicola Bellomo held the harbour of Bari until Allied forces arrived, while to the south the 58th Infantry Division "Legnano", the 152nd Infantry Division "Piceno" and the 210th Coastal Division held their positions between Grottaglie and Lecce. More to the north, Foggia was occupied by German troops, and the local garrison commander, General Felice Caperdoni, shot himself after ordering his men to lay down their weapons. The situation of the XXXI Italian Army Corps (General Mercalli), stationed in Calabria with three coastal divisions and the 104th Infantry Division "Mantova", was more difficult: it was attacked by the 76th Panzerkorps and sustained casualties, and the III Battalion/ 185th Infantry Regiment "Nembo" sided with the Germans and joined the 1st German Parachute Division.

General Fridolin von Senger und Etterlin, the German commander in Sardinia, was ordered by Kesselring to withdraw to Corsica with the 90th Panzergrenadier Division. This manoeuvre was a complete success; the Italian forces present in the area (consisting of the 30th Infantry Division "Sabauda", the 31st Infantry Division "Calabria", the 47th Infantry Division "Bari", the 184th Infantry Division "Nembo", the 203rd Coastal Division, the 204th Coastal Division and the 205th Coastal Division), under General Antonio Basso, lacked mobility and did not go into action until 12 September; due to previous agreements made with the German commands, they did not impede the transfer of the German forces to Corsica, which was completed by 18 September with a few wounded caused by a skirmish near Oristano. The XII Battalion of the Nembo Division, which had reacted negatively to the news of the armistice, mutinied, killed the divisional chief of staff, Colonel Alberto Bechi Lucerna, and joined the 90th Panzergrenadier Division.

In Corsica, after initial confusion and fruitless negotiations, General Giovanni Magli, commander of the VII Italian Army Corps (20th Infantry Division "Friuli" and 44th Infantry Division "Cremona"), attacked the Waffen-SS "Reichführer-SS" brigade, while some French units landed at Ajaccio on 12 September. On 13 September, following the arrival of the 90th Panzergrenadier Division from Sardinia, Bastia (where a previous German attempt to capture the port and Italian shipping had been thwarted by Italian ships) fell in German hands, but the Wehrmacht Supreme Command ordered General Von Senger und Etterlin to leave the island and withdraw to Piombino. The German forces were evacuated from Corsica by 4 October, despite attacks by the Italian and French forces (the latter consisting of the 4th Moroccan Mountain Division).

On 12 September, paratrooper units under Major Harald Mors, which also included the SS officer Otto Skorzeny (who had located the different prisons where Mussolini had been held), carried out Operation Eiche and freed Mussolini from detention in Campo Imperatore, Gran Sasso; this was an essential premise for the creation of a new fascist collaborationist government wanted by Hitler.

=== Disintegration of Italian forces in central and northern Italy ===
The strategic situation in central and northern Italy was much more favorable to the Germans than in the south. Army Group B, under Field Marshal Rommel, had a considerable number of troops, was far away from possible Allied intervention, and its units were deployed so as to be ready to intervene against Italian units, which were much less prepared and lacked clear orders. Moreover, the behavior of many of the Italian commanders further favored the success of the "Achse" plan: the local Italian superior commands, mostly concerned with avoiding riots, devastation, and popular insurrections, refused the help of civilians in the resistance, sometimes autonomously dissolved their units, and started negotiations with the Germans for an uneventful handover. Even the civilian leadership of the major cities carried out the instructions of the chief of police, Carmine Senise, mostly aimed at avoiding riots, and thus collaborated with the German authorities. Under such circumstances, Rommel carried out his task with speed and efficiency, while many Italian units quickly disintegrated and offered little resistance; Army Group B strictly carried out the orders about the internment of Italian troops, and by 20 September, 183,300 of the 13,000 officers and 402,000 soldiers captured had already been sent to Germany.

German units in Piedmont quickly neutralized the Italian units; in Turin (where General Rossi refused to arm the civilians – on 18 August, he had ordered his men to fire on the crowd during a popular demonstration – and immediately initiated negotiations) and Novara (where General Casentino surrendered his entire command) the high commands did not attempt any resistance, immediately handed over their weapons and surrendered with their disintegrating units; Rossi surrendered as soon as German armored units entered Turin (he later joined the Italian Social Republic). In Liguria, by 11 September the German troops of the 87th Corps (76th and 94th Infantry Division) and the 51st Corps (65th and 305th Infantry Division) occupied all positions, while the XVI Italian Army Corps (105th Infantry Division "Rovigo" and 6th Alpine Division "Alpi Graie") dissolved; German units also entered the naval base of La Spezia but the Italian fleet had already sailed, while ships unable to sail had been scuttled or sabotaged.

In Milan, General Vittorio Ruggero, commander of the garrison, bought time for 48 hours and then reached an agreement with a German colonel of the 1st SS Panzer Division "Leibstandarte Adolf Hitler"; Ruggero dissolved without a fight the 5th Infantry Division "Cosseria", which was being re-formed after the heavy losses suffered in Russia, and already on the following day the Waffen-SS units broke the agreement, occupied Milan and arrested Ruggero, who was sent to POW camps in Germany along with his soldiers. After a brief resistance, the garrison of Verona and its commander, General Guglielmo Orengo, were disarmed and deported by the German forces.

Despite the Alpine Wall fortifications, Italian units quickly disintegrated also in Trentino-South Tyrol: by 9 September, the two alpine divisions of XXV Army Corps of General Alessandro Gloria (2nd Alpine Division "Tridentina" and 4th Alpine Division "Cuneense"), both under re-constitution after their destruction on the Eastern Front) were immediately attacked and disarmed by the 44th German Infantry Division, which was already deployed south of Brenner Pass and by the "Doelha" Brigade; only in Rovereto did some units resist until the morning of 10 September, before surrendering. In Emilia, the 2nd SS-Panzerkorps of General Paul Hausser occupied the territory and destroyed the weak Italian units in the area without difficulty: the 24th Panzer Division and "Leibstandarte Adolf Hitler" quickly entered Modena and Bologna, the 3rd Cavalry Division "Principe Amedeo Duca d'Aosta", which was being re-formed after the losses suffered in Russia, was disarmed, and the soldiers taken prisoner.

The 71st German Infantry Division encountered more difficulty in occupying Friuli and the Julian March whereas the 3rd Alpine Division "Julia" and the 2nd Infantry Division "Sforzesca", both being re-formed after their destruction in Russia, were soon disarmed, the 52nd Infantry Division "Torino" put up resistance in Gorizia, where workers formed the first partisan groups. Meanwhile, Slovene partisan formations invaded part of this region, where they often inflicted bloody reprisals against the Italian civilian population. Only towards the end of the month, the 71st German Infantry Division, assisted by Italian collaborationist soldiers of the Italian Social Republic, regained control of the situation, repelled the Yugoslav partisans and occupied all the territory. In Trieste, General Alberto Ferrero, after fruitless talks with anti-fascist representatives, started negotiations with the Germans and then abandoned the city, and 90,000 Italian soldiers in the area, abandoned without orders, surrendered without a fight.

In central Italy north of Rome, the 5th Italian Army of General Mario Caracciolo di Feroleto, headquartered in Orte, was dissolved on 11 September, and its soldiers were disarmed and interned; the 3rd Infantry Division "Ravenna", headquartered in Grosseto, and the coastal formations of the northern Tyrrhenian Sea disintegrated, and German units entered the cities; Livorno was captured on 10 September. In Florence, General Armellini Chiappi immediately allowed the Germans to enter the city; Colonel Chiari in Arezzo and Colonel Laurei in Massa gave up their forces without attempting any resistance. Italian units and civilian volunteers in Piombino repelled a German landing attempt between 10 and 11 September, killing or capturing some hundreds of German soldiers, but on 12 September the Italian superior commands surrendered the town to the Germans.

Army Group B completed its task by 19 September, occupying all of central and northern Italy, disarming and capturing a great part of the Italian troops and sizable booty, that included 236 armored fighting vehicles, 1,138 field guns, 536 anti-tank guns, 797 anti-aircraft guns, 5,926 machine guns and 386,000 rifles. Along with 13,000 officers and 402,000 Italian soldiers, 43,000 Allied prisoners, previously held by the Italians, were also captured. Rommel organized a quick transfer to Germany of the captured Italian soldiers, which were sent through the Brenner Pass, partly by train, partly on foot.

== Disintegration of Italian forces abroad ==
=== France ===
The 4th Army (General Mario Vercellino) consisting of the 5th Alpine Division "Pusteria", the 2nd Cavalry Division "Emanuele Filiberto Testa di Ferro" and the 48th Infantry Division "Taro", was on its way from Provence to Italy when news of the armistice came; panic immediately spread among the troops, and rumors about the aggressiveness and brutality of the German troops caused demoralization and disintegration of the units towards the border. The army, dispersed between France, Piedmont and Liguria, disintegrated between 9 and 11 September, under the pressure of the converging German forces of Field Marshals Gerd von Rundstedt (from Provence) and Erwin Rommel (from Italy).

Taking advantage of the disintegration of the Italian units, the German troops swiftly captured all positions: the 356th and 715th Infantry Division entered Toulon and reached the Var river, while the Panzergrenadier Division Feldherrnhalle occupied the riviera till Menton. Mont Cenis pass, held by Italian units, was attacked in a pincer movement by German units from France (units of the 157th and 715th Infantry Division) and Piedmont (units of the Leibstandarte Adolf Hitler, coming from Turin); the Italian garrison defended the pass for some time, then surrendered after blowing up part of the Fréjus Rail Tunnel. Most soldiers of the 4th Army dispersed and tried to reach their homes; some others decided to remain with the Germans, whereas sizeable groups chose to oppose the occupation and went into the mountains, where they joined groups of anti-fascist civilians and thus formed the first partisan groups in Piedmont. On 12 September, General Vercellino formally dissolved his Army, while General Raffaello Operti secured the Army treasure, part of which would later be used to fund the resistance.

=== Balkans ===
Italian forces in the Balkans (Slovenia, Dalmatia, Croatia, Bosnia, Herzegovina, Montenegro, Albania and Greece) amounted to over 30 divisions and 500,000 soldiers, who had been engaged for two years in waging counter-guerrilla operations against Yugoslav and Greek partisans. Italian forces in the area consisted of the 2nd Italian Army (General Mario Robotti) in Slovenia and Dalmatia, of the 9th Italian Army (General Lorenzo Dalmazzo), stationed in Albania and under the control of Army Group East of General Ezio Rosi (which also included the troops in Bosnia and Montenegro), and of the 11th Italian Army (General Carlo Vecchiarelli) in Greece, the latter under Army Group E of General Alexander Löhr.

Italian troops in the area were exhausted after years of wearing anti-partisan operations, characterized by brutalities, reprisals and repression, and were isolated in a hostile territory, mixed with numerous German divisions (over 20 divisions of Army Group F of Field Marshal Von Weichs, and of Army Group E of General Löhr) and Croat collaborationist units whom, on 9 September, immediately severed all ties with Italy and joined Germany in the fight against the former ally. Without any land connection, and with confusing and vague orders, units quickly disintegrated and many soldiers were disarmed, captured and deported to Germany. However, Italian soldiers in this area fought with more determination than the units left in Italy, suffering heavy casualties and harsh reprisals by the German units.

Some units managed to escape capture and joined Yugoslav or Greek partisan formations, subsequently fighting alongside them; the population was often friendly towards the soldiers, and helped them. German forces, less numerous but more mobile, determined and well-led, and enjoying complete air supremacy, quickly prevailed, brutally crushing Italian resistance, often summarily executing Italian officers, and occupying all the Balkan region; 393,000 Italian soldiers were captured and deported, about 29,000 joined the Germans, 20,000 joined Partisan formations, and 57,000 dispersed or hid and tried to survive.

==== Yugoslavia ====
The V Army Corps, XI Army Corps, and XVIII Army Corps which formed the 2nd Army, stationed in Slovenia, Croatia and Dalmatia, were attacked by two Croat and three German divisions; General Gastone Gambara, commander of XI Army Corps, started negotiations in Fiume and then abandoned his troops on 14 September, leaving them to be captured; Pola also fell without resistance. On 11 September the divisions stationed in Dalmatia were ordered to avoid any resistance in the hope of a peaceful repatriation, but the subordinate units refused, and started fighting against the Germans. The 14th Infantry Division "Isonzo", 22nd Infantry Division "Cacciatori delle Alpi" and 153rd Infantry Division "Macerata" were dissolved, whereas the 57th Infantry Division "Lombardia" and the 154th Infantry Division "Murge" resisted in Susak and Karlovac; the 158th Infantry Division "Zara" surrendered on 10 September and its commanders were deported, while in Split the 15th Infantry Division "Bergamo" made an agreement with Yugoslav partisans and defended the town till 27 September against the 7th SS Volunteer Mountain Division Prinz Eugen, sent from Mostar; after surrender, three Italian generals (Alfonso Cigala Fulgosi, Salvatore Pelligra and Angelo Policardi) and 46 officers were executed. The 1st Cavalry Division "Eugenio di Savoia", stationed in Dalmatia, was dispersed.

In Bosnia and Herzegovina, the 18th Infantry Division "Messina" resisted for four days, while the 32nd Infantry Division "Marche" tried to defend Dubrovnik, but the German forces crushed its resistance; the commander of the Division, General Giuseppe Amico, was captured by the Germans during a parley and released to convince his men to surrender, but he instead rallied them against the Germans. Recaptured later, he was executed. In Montenegro, the 23rd Infantry Division "Ferrara" disintegrated, while the 155th Infantry Division "Emilia" defended the Bay of Kotor till 16 September, then it had to surrender; the soldiers of the 19th Infantry Division "Venezia" and of the 1st Alpine Division "Taurinense" joined Tito's partisans and formed the Partisan Division "Garibaldi", which kept fighting against the Germans, despite some violent "incomprehensions" with the Yugoslavs, till March 1945.

==== Albania ====
Italian forces in Albania consisted of the six divisions of the 9th Army (General Dalmazzo); the headquarters of Army Group East (General Rosi) was in Tirana. Left without clear orders, Italian commanders showed indecision and insufficient fighting spirit; on the contrary, German forces (Superior Command "Kroatien" with two Jäger divisions, and one mountain division, and part of the 1st Panzer Division) acted swiftly and with great aggressiveness. In the morning of 11 September, the command of Army Group East was surrounded and General Rosi was immediately captured along with his officers, while General Dalmazzo did not react to the German attacks, did not issue any order of resistance and started negotiations with the Germans, hastening the disintegration of his forces.

The 11th Infantry Division "Brennero" (whose commander, General Princivalle, kept an ambivalent behavior), 38th Infantry Division "Puglie", 49th Infantry Division "Parma" and 53rd Infantry Division "Arezzo" handed over their weapons and were dissolved (most men of the Brennero Division however managed to return to Italy by sea, while a considerable part of the men of the Arezzo Division escaped and joined the partisans), while the 41st Infantry Division "Firenze" (General Arnaldo Azzi) and the 151st Infantry Division "Perugia" (General Ernesto Chiminello) tried to resist. The Firenze Division faced the Germans in battle but was defeated near Kruja, after which the Division was dissolved and its men joined the partisan formations; the Perugia Division retreated to Porto Edda after a fighting retreat and some of its men managed to embark on ships headed for Italy, but most of the division, weakened by the exhausting march through the Albanian mountains and the continuous attacks, was surrounded and surrendered on 22 September, after which General Chiminello and 130 officers were executed. Some survivors joined the partisans, forming the Antonio Gramsci Battalion.

Over 15,000 dispersed Italian soldiers were sheltered by the population; the 21st German Mountain Corps established its headquarters in Tirana already on 10 September. Overall, about 90,000 Italian soldiers were captured in Albania, whereas a further 45,000 evaded capture and dispersed around the country; some of them were sheltered by the population in exchange for their labour, while many others succumbed to cold and starvation (British documents estimated mortality among Italian soldiers in Albania at about one hundred deaths per day in the winter of 1943–1944).

==== Mainland Greece and Crete ====
In mainland Greece, as elsewhere, uncertainty and ambivalent behavior of the Italian superior officers favored a rapid German success; Italian forces in this region, consisting of the 11th Army with headquarters in Athens, were subordinate to Army Group E of General Löhr, whom had numerically inferior but more efficient units (three Jäger divisions, part of the 1st Panzer Division and a Luftwaffe field division). General Carlo Vecchiarelli, commander of the 11th Army, issued at first an order dictating that no initiatives were to be taken against the Germans, and on 9 September, believing the German assurances of safe-conducts to return to Italy, he ordered his troops to avoid any resistance and hand over the weapons to the Germans, without fighting.

The consequence was the disintegration of most of the units: the 29th Infantry Division "Piemonte", 36th Infantry Division "Forlì", 37th Infantry Division "Modena", 56th Infantry Division "Casale" and 59th Infantry Division "Cagliari" were easily disarmed and their soldiers were captured and sent to Germany. The 24th Infantry Division "Pinerolo", stationed in Thessaly, rejected Vecchiarelli's orders; General Adolfo Infante, after fighting in Larissa, retreated to the Pindus massif, where he tried to obtain collaboration of the ELAS partisans. At first the Greek partisans agreed, but then they attacked the cavalry Regiment "Lancieri di Aosta" to capture its weapons; Infante left for Italy, and his men were "dispersed among the local population under the guidance of EAM/ELAS in order to be fed and survive the winter" though many were used as forced labour under harsh conditions for the rest of the war, which resulted in the deaths of several thousand Italians.

After being ordered to disarm his unit or transfer it to German command, Angelico Carta the commander of the 51st Infantry Division "Siena" stationed in east Crete, decided to side against the Italian Social Republic. He contacted the Special Operations Executive (SOE) through the division's counter-intelligence officer, arranging that he and members of his staff sympathetic to the Allied cause be smuggled to Egypt along with the defense plans for the east of the island. After abandoning his car north-east of Neapoli as a diversion, Carta and his comrades set foot for south-west. Evading German patrols and observation planes he embarked a Motor Torpedo Boat at Tsoutsouro reaching Mersa Matruh the next afternoon, on 23 September 1943.

==== Ionian Islands and the Dodecanese ====
German commands believed that it would be of great importance to retain control of the Ionian Islands and the Dodecanese, garrisoned by Italian troops, as they were believed to be of great strategic importance as a peripheral naval and air base and a defensive stronghold against possible Allied attacks on the Balkan front. Therefore, German forces launched a series of operations aimed at capturing the most important of these islands, with a sizable concentration of land and air forces. These operations caused some bloody battles against the Italian garrisons (who tried to resist, relying on their numerical superiority, geographical isolation and in some cases Allied assistance) and atrocities after surrender.

The Allies, despite insistence from Winston Churchill who supported a powerful Allied intervention in these islands to support the Italian garrisons and to secure valuable naval and air bases (which would turn useful for attacks on the southern Balkan front of "Fortress Europe"), only sent weak contingents with scarce air support, and were thus unable to change the course of the events, which progressively turned in favor of the Wehrmacht.

In Crete, the 51st Infantry Division "Siena" and LI Special Brigade "Lecce" were immediately neutralized and disarmed by the German forces in the island (the "Kreta" fortress brigade and the 22nd Air Landing Division, a veteran of the German invasion of the Netherlands and of the Siege of Sevastopol); part of the Italian soldiers joined the Germans, whereas most of them were imprisoned and transferred to mainland Greece by sea, but at least 4,700 of them drowned in the sinking by Allied air and submarine attacks of two of the ships that were carrying them (Sinfra and Petrella). Rhodes also quickly fell to the Germans; Italian forces there (the 50th Infantry Division "Regina" and part of the 6th Infantry Division "Cuneo", with 34,000 men), enjoyed numerical superiority over the German forces of General Kleeman (7,000 men of the "Rhodos" Division), but after an inconclusive battle the Italian commander, Admiral Inigo Campioni, surrendered when the Germans threatened to launch heavy bombings against the town of Rhodes. Karpathos was occupied by German forces on 13 September, after Campioni had ordered the island garrison to surrender. Over 6,500 Italian soldiers of the Rhodes garrison died after surrender, most of them in the sinking of the steamers Oria and Donizetti that were carrying them to mainland Greece; Campioni was later executed by Fascist authorities for having defended the island.

British units landed in Leros and Kos, where they joined the Italian garrisons in countering the German invasion (carried out by the 22nd Air Landing Division), but mediocre coordination, better German efficiency and German air supremacy led to a German victory and the capture of both islands. Kos fell on 4 October, with 2,500 Italian and 600 British soldiers taken prisoners; 96 Italian officers, including the garrison commander (Colonel Felice Leggio), were executed. Leros, defended by its 7,600-strong Italian garrison reinforced by 4,500 British soldiers, resisted for much longer; after weeks of continuous bombing, on 12 November 2,700 German soldiers landed or were parachuted in different points of the island and, despite numerical inferiority, they prevailed by 16 November, forcing both Italians and British to surrender. The Italian commander, Rear Admiral Luigi Mascherpa, was later executed by RSI authorities, like Campioni.

The most tragic events took place in the Ionian Islands, namely Corfu and Cephalonia, which the German command considered to be of utmost importance for defense of the Balkan coast against possible Allied landings. The Italian garrison on Cephalonia, consisting in the 33rd Infantry Division "Acqui" with 11,500 men under General Antonio Gandin, at first did not take any initiative against the much smaller German garrison (2,000 mountain troops under Lieutenant Colonel Hans Barge), and waited for clear orders. On 11 September, the Germans presented an ultimatum which ordered the Italians to surrender; Gandin at first decided to hand over the weapons, but after signs of protest and unrest among his men, he decided to resist. On 13 September, after receiving clear orders from the superior commands in Brindisi, Gandin rejected the ultimatum and attacked the German landing craft attempting to reach the island.

On 15 September, the Germans intervened in force, landing five battalions of mountain troops of the 1st Mountain Division of General Hubert Lanz, supported by self-propelled guns. The Germans repelled the Italian attack and then, after fierce fighting, went on the offensive on 21 September and forced the Italians to surrender at 11:00 on 22 September. After the surrender, the Germans began a bloody reprisal; General Gandin, about 400 officers and 4,000 to 5,000 men of the Acqui Division were executed. 1,300 men had previously been killed in the battle, and another 1,350 subsequently perished in the sinking of ships that were carrying them to mainland Greece. In Corfu the 4,500-strong Italian garrison easily overpowered and captured the 500-strong German garrison; the German prisoners were transferred by sea to Italy (and their presence in Italian hands is probably the reason that prevented the Germans from committing another full-scale massacre like in Cephalonia), while the garrison was reinforced by 3,500 more men. Between 24 and 25 September, however, more German forces, with Luftwaffe support, landed in the island, and on 26 September the Italians, after losing some hundreds of men and running out of ammunition, surrendered. The Italian commander, Colonel Luigi Lusignani, was executed along with 28 of his officers; 1,302 Italian prisoners perished in the sinking of the motor ship Mario Roselli which was to transfer them to the mainland.

== Italian fleet ==
Attacks on the fleet

The clauses of the armistice specifically demanded the surrender of the Italian fleet, as the 'elimination' of the battleships of the Italian Royal Navy would allow a reduction of the Allied naval forces in the Mediterranean. Like their colleagues of the Army, the commanders of the Italian Navy also showed indecision and a lack of capability; the Chief of Staff, Admiral Raffaele de Courten, who had been forewarned of the armistice, remained undecided till the evening of 8 September whether he should comply and surrender the fleet, or order it to be scuttled. Moreover, till the evening of 8 September De Courten did not inform Admiral Carlo Bergamini, the commander of the Italian main battleship force based in La Spezia, about the armistice. Only at that point did he order a bewildered Bergamini to sail with his ship, heading for La Maddalena.

Immediately thereafter, De Courten joined Badoglio and the king in their escape towards Brindisi, and he thus abandoned his command, leaving behind in Rome his deputy chief of staff, Admiral Luigi Sansonetti. The latter, despite his precarious situation, kept radio contact with the ships at sea till 12 September, when De Courten assumed command again. Bergamini, after a meeting to convince his reluctant officers of the need to abide by the orders, sailed from La Spezia only at 03:00 on 9 September; the consequence was that the Italian fleet was spotted in daylight and attacked at 14:00 by German aircraft which, employing new Fritz X guided bombs, sank Bergamini's flagship Roma. Bergamini perished along 1,393 of his men. Roma's sister ship Italia was damaged.

After the sinking the rest of the fleet, now under Admiral Romeo Oliva, headed for Malta. A few destroyers and torpedo boats were left behind to pick up Roma's survivors, and afterwards reached the Balearic Islands, where they were interned by the Spanish authorities; two of them, Pegaso and Impetuoso, were scuttled near Mahon by their commanders, who did not want them interned or handed over to the Allies. The bulk of the fleet (including the battleships Italia and Vittorio Veneto and five light cruisers) reached Malta on 10 September; a smaller force from Taranto, including the battleships Duilio and Andrea Doria and three light cruisers, under Admiral Alberto Da Zara, had already been transferred there. A number of other Italian ships, mostly torpedo boats, corvettes and submarines (a large group had gathered in Portoferraio under the command of Admiral Amedeo Nomis di Pollone and then sailed to American-controlled Palermo on 12 September before moving on to Malta), also flocked to Malta during the following days; the last Italian battleship, Giulio Cesare, arrived there on 13 September.

While most of the operational ships of the Italian Navy managed to reach Allied-controlled ports, some were sunk on their way by German ships and aircraft; among them the destroyers Quintino Sella, Ugolino Vivaldi and Antonio Da Noli, the torpedo boats T 6 and T 8, the corvette Berenice, the submarine Topazio (sunk by Allied aircraft in unclear circumstances), the gunboat Aurora, the auxiliary cruiser Piero Foscari, the munition transport Buffoluto, the repair ship Quarnaro and the minelayer Pelagosa, as well as several motor torpedo boats, submarine chasers and smaller craft. Among the casualties was Rear Admiral Federico Martinengo, commander of the Italian anti-submarine forces, killed in action onboard submarine chaser VAS 234 during a skirmish with German R boats.

In the Black Sea, the Italian flotilla of five CB-class midget submarines was seized by Romanian naval authorities, and despite strong German protest, the Romanian naval commander, Rear Admiral Horia Macellariu, stood his ground and the five midget submarines remained a new addition to the Royal Romanian Navy.

A different fate was met by Italian warships in Crete and Greece, where German forces were prevailing; only the torpedo boat Monzambano managed to escape, while two destroyers and four torpedo boats were captured. Moreover, the torpedo boat Insidioso was captured in Pola, the torpedo boat T 7 was captured in Gruž, the torpedo boat Giuseppe Missori was captured in Durrës (a sister ship, Rosolino Pilo, was also captured, but her crew later overpowered the German guards and reached an Italian-controlled port) and the submarines Francesco Rismondo and H6 were captured in Bonifacio. The submarines Ametista and Serpente were scuttled by their commanders off Ancona. The armistice also meant the loss of all ships that were undergoing repair or maintenance work, or suffered from mechanical breakdown, or were unable to put to sea; these included the battleship Cavour, the heavy cruisers Gorizia and Bolzano, the light cruiser Taranto, eight destroyers, thirteen torpedo boats, eight corvettes and twenty submarines. Most of them were scuttled or sabotaged, the rest were captured. German forces also captured a number of ships under construction; among them the incomplete aircraft carrier Aquila and several Capitani Romani-class cruisers, Ariete-class torpedo boats, Gabbiano-class corvettes, Flutto-class submarines and R-class transport submarines. Many Ariete-class and Gabbiano-class ships were completed by the Germans and entered service with the Kriegsmarine.

The majority of the officers and men of the Italian Navy were deeply disappointed by the order to surrender to the Allies; discipline was maintained, although there were some instances of insubordination, mutiny and attempts to prevent from surrendering some ships. The most notable episodes were the above-mentioned scuttling of the torpedo boats Pegaso and Impetuoso, the arrest of Rear Admiral Giovanni Galati, who insisted on scuttling the ships, and the mutiny of part of the crew of the battleship Giulio Cesare, who imprisoned its commander and planned to scuttle the ship, but was eventually persuaded to comply with the orders.

Most of what remained of the Italian merchant fleet was captured by the German forces in Italian harbors.

== Italian air force ==
The Regia Aeronautica was also taken completely by surprise by the armistice, and also in this case the high commands showed improvidence and ineptitude; the Chief of Staff, General Renato Sandalli, did not inform his subordinates till 5 September, then, in the night of 8 September, he ceded command to General Giuseppe Santoro and fled to Brindisi without issuing the executive orders of the planned directive ("Memorandum No. 1"). The Italian air bases did not receive any clear order and thus the air force was not employed against the German invaders, who instead took the initiative and swiftly captured the main air bases in northern Italy, where most of the remaining aircraft were based. Only on 11 September Santoro ordered all units to take off to reach Allied-controlled air bases, while the commander of the Rome air bases, General Ilari, started negotiations and handed over bases and planes to the Germans. Out of about 800 operational aircraft, only 246 managed to reach Allied-controlled territory, while two-thirds of the planes fell in German hands, and 43 were shot down by Luftwaffe planes while flying south. Some fighter units decided to stay with the Axis and formed the core of the National Republican Air Force.

== Aftermath ==
Already on 10 September, the OKW command issued a first communiqué announcing the annihilation of the Italian military apparatus. While many Italian units would fight on for days or weeks in the Greek islands and the Balkans and would retain control of Corsica, Sardinia, Apulia and Calabria, the major units of the Italian Army effectively dissolved in a few days from widespread desertions.

With the success of "Achse" and its secondary operations, the Wehrmacht achieved an important strategic success by securing the most important strategic positions in the Mediterranean theatre and overcoming great operative difficulties; it also captured large quantities of weapons, equipment and resources that proved useful in augmenting the depleting resources of Germany. Over 20,000 Italian soldiers were killed in battle and nearly 800,000 were captured; over 13,000 of them drowned in the sinking of several ships that were carrying them from Aegean islands to the Greek mainland, and the others were not recognized prisoner of war status and were instead classified as "Italian Military Internees" and exploited for forced labour in Germany's war industry. Up to 50,000 of them died in German captivity.

The Allies, whose objectives in the Mediterranean were rather limited (to push Italy out of the war and to keep part of the German forces engaged) and whose strategic planning presented heavy conflicts between the British and Americans, were not able to exploit the Italian collapse and limited themselves to advancing up the Italian peninsula during a less than two years campaign, which required much land and air forces and resources. The Germans, however, had to divert a considerable number of mobile and skilled units to Italy and the Balkans, troops that would have been more useful on the main Eastern and Western fronts, but that allowed them to keep war away from the southern regions of Germany, to protect rich industrial regions of high importance in weapons production and to achieve political and propaganda objective of creating an Italian fascist government, formally still allied to the Third Reich.

The sudden and complete collapse of the Italian state and war machine was mainly caused by the mistakes made by the political and military leadership, the unrealism of their initiatives, misunderstanding about the real consistence and objectives of the Allies by the decision of the Italian leadership to surrender to the Allies, but not to fight the Germans. The lack of clear orders to the subordinate commands, the importance given to the personal safety of the leadership and its institutional continuity, even to the detriment of the capability of resistance of the armed forces, led to the disintegration of the units, abandoned without a leader to the German attacks and reprisals despite some instances of valour and fighting spirit.

== Numbers ==
According to German accounts, the Italian forces disarmed totaled 1,006,370. Broken down by region, they were:

- 415,682 in northern Italy
- 102,340 in southern Italy
- 8,722 in France
- 164,986 in Yugoslavia
- 265,000 in mainland Greece and the Aegean islands

The disarmament of such a large army resulted in the confiscation of large numbers of weapons and military-related equipment:

- 1,285,871 rifles
- 39,007 machine guns
- 13,906 MAB 38 submachine guns
- 8,736 mortars
- 2,754 field guns
- 5,568 other artillery pieces
- 16,631 vehicles
- 977 armored vehicles

Only 197,000 Italian soldiers continued the war alongside the Germans. Some 94,000, mostly fascists, chose this option right away. The rest, some 103,000 men, chose during their detention to support the Italian Social Republic to escape the harsh circumstances in the German labor camps. Between 600,000 and 650,000 remained in German labor camps, where between 37,000 and 50,000 of them perished. Between 20,000 and 30,000 Italian soldiers had been killed during the fighting in September 1943, and 13,000 more had perished in the sinking of POW ships in the Aegean.

Oflag 64/Z in Schokken, Poland became the camp where most Italian general officers captured by German troops during Operation Achse were gathered. By November 1943, the Italian military internee population of Oflag 64/Z included three army generals, twenty-two army corps generals, forty-six division generals, eighty-four brigadier generals, one fleet admiral, four vice admirals, two rear admirals, one air fleet general, two air division generals, three air brigade generals, and a general of the MVSN. Among the most prominent Italian generals held in Oflag 64/Z were Italo Gariboldi (former commander of the Eighth Army), Ezio Rosi (former commander of Army Group East), Carlo Geloso (former commander of Italian occupation forces in Greece), Carlo Vecchiarelli (former commander of the 9th Army), Lorenzo Dalmazzo (former commander of the 11th Army) and Sebastiano Visconti Prasca (notable for having commanded the Italian invasion force in the early stages of the Greco-Italian War).

Considered "traitors" due to their refusal to swear allegiance to the Italian Social Republic, the generals were mistreated and underfed; five of them (Alberto de Agazio, Umberto di Giorgio, Davide Dusmet, Armellini Chiappi and Rodolfo Torresan) died during captivity at the camp, whereas admirals Inigo Campioni and Luigi Mascherpa were handed over to RSI authorities, tried and executed for having opposed the German takeover in the Dodecanese. About a dozen generals eventually accepted to join the Italian Social Republic and were repatriated, whereas a group of others, who had not formally joined but were seen as more favourable to the German cause, were transferred to Vittel internment camp, where they enjoyed better treatment. Another group, considered as particularly anti-German, was transferred to Stalag XX-A in Toruń, where they received a harsher treatment. Most remained in Schokken till late January 1945, when they were transferred westwards with a forced march through the snow; during the march, six generals (Carlo Spatocco, Alberto Trionfi, Alessandro Vaccaneo, Ugo Ferrero, Emanuele Balbo Bertone, and Giuseppe Andreoli) were shot by the SS for being unable to keep pace with the other prisoners. Another two, Francesco Antonio Arena and Alberto Briganti, managed to escape and hid in a Polish farm, but were found by Soviet soldiers and shot after being mistaken for German collaborators, with Arena dying and Briganti miraculously surviving. The other generals were liberated by the advancing Red Army a few days later and repatriated in the autumn of 1945.

== Sources ==
- Elena Aga Rossi, Una nazione allo sbando. 8 settembre 1943, Bologna, il Mulino, 2003, ISBN 978-88-15-11322-1.
- Roberto Battaglia, Storia della Resistenza italiana, Torino, Einaudi, 1964,
- Eddy Bauer, Storia controversa della seconda guerra mondiale, vol. V, Novara, De Agostini, 1971,
- Giorgio Bocca, Storia dell'Italia partigiana, Milano, Mondadori, 1995, ISBN 88-04-40129-X.
- Botjer, George F. (1996). Sideshow War: The Italian Campaign 1943-1945. College Station: Texas A&M University Press. ISBN 978-0-890-96718-8 – via Internet Archive.
- Frederick William Deakin, La brutale amicizia. Mussolini, Hitler e la caduta del fascismo italiano, Torino, Einaudi, 1990, ISBN 88-06-11821-8.
- Renzo De Felice, Mussolini l'alleato. Crisi e agonia del regime, Torino, Einaudi, 1996, ISBN 88-06-14031-0.
- Renzo De Felice, Mussolini l'alleato. La guerra civile, Torino, Einaudi, 1997, ISBN 88-06-14996-2.
- Carlo D'Este, 1943, lo sbarco in Sicilia, Milano, Mondadori, 1990, ISBN 88-04-33046-5.
- Helmuth Heiber, I verbali di Hitler, Gorizia, LEG, 2009, ISBN 978-88-6102-042-9.
- David Irving, La guerra di Hitler, Roma, Settimo Sigillo, 2001,
- Ian Kershaw, Hitler. 1936–1945, Milano, Bompiani, 2001, ISBN 88-452-4969-7.
- Lutz Klinkhammer, L'occupazione tedesca in Italia 1943–1945, Torino, Bollati Boringhieri, 2007, ISBN 978-88-339-1782-5.
- Erich Kuby, 1943, Il tradimento tedesco, Milano, BUR, 1996, ISBN 88-17-11674-2.
- Koukounas, Demosthenes (2013). Η Ιστορία της Κατοχής [History of the Occupation] (in Greek). Vol. II. Athens: Livani. ISBN 978-960-14-2687-7.
- Leigh Fermor, Patrick (2014). Abducting a General: The Kreipe Operation and SOE in Crete. London: John Murray. ISBN 978-1-4447-9658-2.
- Eric Morris, La guerra inutile, Milano, Longanesi & C., 1993, ISBN 88-304-1154-X.
- Gianni Oliva, I vinti e i liberati. 8 settembre 1943–25 aprile 1945 : storia di due anni, Milano, Mondadori, 1994, ISBN 88-04-36897-7.
- Marco Patricelli, Settembre 1943. I giorni della vergogna, Bari, Editori Laterza, 2009, ISBN 978-88-420-8827-1.
- Arrigo Petacco, La nostra guerra 1940–1945, Milano, Mondadori (edizione per "Il Giornale"), 1995.
- Marco Picone Chiodo, In nome della resa. L'Italia nella seconda guerra mondiale (1940–1945), Milano, Mursia, 1990, ISBN 88-425-0654-0.
- Giorgio Rochat, Le guerre italiane 1935–1943, Torino, Einaudi, 2005, ISBN 88-06-16118-0.
- William L. Shirer, Storia del Terzo Reich, Torino, Einaudi, 1990, ISBN 88-06-11698-3.
- Roberto Zedda, Oristano il Ponte Mannu 1943, Oristano, E.P. d'O., 2012.
