= Armellini Chiappi =

Italian general

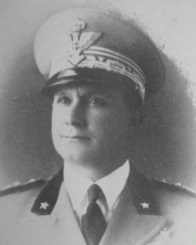
- Born: 2 December 1879; Rome, Kingdom of Italy
- Died: 4 November 1944 (aged 64); Wöllstein, Germany
- Military career
- Allegiance: Kingdom of Italy
- Branch: Royal Italian Army
- Service years: 1907–1944
- Rank: Lieutenant General
- Commands: 41st Infantry Regiment "Modena"; 2nd Infantry Brigade; 29th Infantry Division Piemonte; Florence Territorial Division; Territorial Defense of Florence
- Conflicts: Italo-Turkish War; Battle of Misrata; World War I; World War II; Operation Achse
- Awards: Silver Medal of Military Valor (posthumous); Bronze Medal of Military Valor; Order of the Crown of Italy; Order of Saints Maurice and Lazarus

Armellini Chiappi (Rome, 2 December 1879 – Wöllstein, 4 November 1944) was an Italian general during World War II. He was in command of the territorial defense of Florence for most of the war.

== Biography ==
He was born in Rome on December 2, 1879, the son of Leo Chiappi. He enlisted in the Royal Italian Army at the age of 17 as a volunteer soldier in the 70th Infantry Regiment "Ancona", and in 1901, with the rank of sergeant, he began to attend the Royal Military Academy of Infantry and Cavalry in Modena as a cadet officer, graduating with the rank of infantry second lieutenant on 7 September 1903. He was promoted to lieutenant on 7 September 1906. From October 1911 he took part, with the 63rd Infantry Regiment "Cagliari", in the Italo-Turkish War, distinguishing himself in the battle of Misrata, for which he was awarded the Bronze Medal of Military Valor.

After the end of the war he attended the courses of the Army War School from 1912 to 1914, and when the Kingdom of Italy entered the First World War on May 24, 1915, having been promoted to captain, he was assigned the command of the 26th Division, from which he was later transferred to the command of the 24th Division and then of the 23rd Division. In 1917, after promotion to major, he was transferred to the General Staff and assigned to the General Intendency in Rome. At the end of the war he was promoted to lieutenant colonel. After the end of the First World War he served in the transport delegation of Bologna, then in that of Venice and then as Chief of Staff of the Livorno Infantry Brigade. He was promoted to colonel in 1926, and in January 1928 he assumed command of the 41st Infantry Regiment "Modena", which he held for the following two years.

In 1930 he was called to serve at the Command of the Central Military Schools in Civitavecchia, where he taught small arms and shooting for 4 years; he also authored books and articles on the subject. On 16 January 1935 he was promoted to brigadier general, first taking command of the 2nd Infantry Brigade, and then becoming deputy commander of the 2nd Infantry Division Sforzesca in Novara. Having become a major general on 1 July 1937, he was assigned to the Infantry Inspectorate in Rome.

In March 1938 he was appointed commander of the 29th Infantry Division Peloritana in Catania (renamed 29th Infantry Division Piemonte in April 1939). On 10 June 1940, the day the Kingdom of Italy entered the Second World War, he was replaced in this post by General Giovanni Cerio and transferred to Florence, where he first commanded the local territorial division and then, after promotion to Lieutenant General on January 1, 1941, its territorial defense until 1943.

Following the proclamation of the Armistice of Cassibile on 8 September 1943, he rejected the requests of the local anti-fascist committee to give weapons to the civilian population, but sent two battalions of the 183rd Infantry Division "Ciclone" (under General Giorgio Morigi) to oppose the advance of the Germans, without success. After three days of skirmishes, on 12 September 1943 Florence was occupied by German troops, and ten days later Chiappi was arrested and sent as a prisoner of war to Oflag 64/Z in Schokken, Poland, where he arrived on 1 October. His health deteriorated due to the hardships he suffered during captivity, and on 14 August 1944, he was hospitalized at the Wöllstein infirmary; he rejected all offers to join the Italian Social Republic in exchange for his release, and he died in the infirmary on the night of the 4 November 1944. He was buried in the Salka cemetery, near the church and the forest adjacent to the POW Camp.
