= Antonio Sorice =

Italian politician

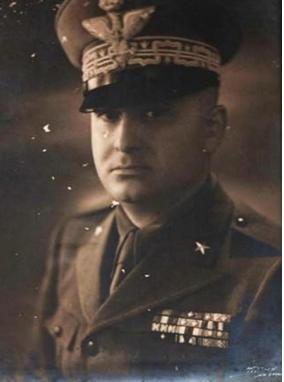
- Born: 3 November 1897; Nola, Kingdom of Italy
- Died: 14 January 1971 (aged 73); Rome, Italy
- Military career
- Allegiance: Kingdom of Italy; Italy
- Branch: Royal Italian Army; Italian Army
- Rank: Lieutenant General
- Conflicts: World War I; Battles of the Isonzo; World War II
- Awards: Silver Medal of Military Valour; War Merit Cross; Military Order of Savoy; Order of the Crown of Italy; Colonial Order of the Star of Italy; Order of the German Eagle; Order of Skanderbeg

Antonio Sorice (3 November 1897 – 14 January 1971) was an Italian general during World War II, Undersecretary for War from February to July 1943 and Minister of War from July 1943 to February 1944.

== Biography ==
He was born in Nola on November 3, 1897 and after completing his studies at the Nunziatella Military School in Naples, he attended the Royal Military Academy of Artillery and Engineers in Turin, graduating as artillery second lieutenant on May 30, 1915, a few day’s after Italy’s entrance into the First World War. He fought during the war, and was captured on the Karst Plateau in 1917. After the end of the war he completed his studies in Turin and then attended the Army School of War in Civitavecchia, subsequently serving in the military garrisons of Genoa and of Ancona.

During 1933 he was transferred to Rome to serve at the Ministry of War, initially attached to the Military Secretariat (in this period he supervised the preparations for the invasion of Ethiopia) and from April 1936, with the rank of colonel, as Deputy Head of Cabinet of the Minister (who at the time was Benito Mussolini himself).

In June 1938 he was appointed Councilor of State and promoted to brigadier general, keeping working at the Ministry of War, from which he was however removed in June 1941, in the middle of World War II, after he had publicly expressed himself on the difficulties incurred at the front by the Italian Army and the need to find a solution to get out of the conflict.

In February 1943 he returned to the Ministry of War as undersecretary, called there by Mussolini for his organizational and technical skills. He also held the position of national councilor of the Chamber of Fasces and Corporations.

Following the fall of the Fascist regime on 25 July 1943, Marshal Pietro Badoglio chose Sorice as Minister of War in his new government. One of his first measures was the restoration of the disciplinary regulations that did not allow members of the Armed Forces to carry out any political activity.

On 3 September 1943 Sorice took part in a restricted meeting of the government, held in Rome at the Palazzo del Viminale (attended by Sorice, Badoglio, Foreign Minister Raffaele Guariglia, Minister of the Royal House Pietro d'Acquarone, Chief of General Staff Vittorio Ambrosio, Air Minister Renato Sandalli and Minister of the Navy Raffaele de Courten), in which Marshal Badoglio informed him that the king had decided to sign an armistice with the Allies and authorized General Giuseppe Castellano to have full powers on this issue. At 17:30 on 8 September, after the Allies had broadcast the news of the armistice, Sorice took part in the Council of the Crown chaired by the King and attended by Badoglio, Ambrosio, Guariglia, De Courten, Sandalli, Acquarone, the head of the SIM Giacomo Carboni, Army Deputy Chief of Staff Giuseppe De Stefanis, the King's aide Paolo Puntoni and Major Luigi Marchesi, Ambrosio's adjutant who had participated in the armistice negotiations alongside Castellano. On that occasion the King officially announced to those present that the armistice had been signed, and shortly thereafter Badoglio announced it on the EIAR radio.

The next day Sorice, along with General Carboni, organized an attempt to replace the head of government Badoglio with Marshal of Italy Enrico Caviglia, who had been summoned to the capital for this purpose. Following a brief telephone contact with Victor Emmanuel III, Marshal Caviglia decided to assume the role of head of government and commander of the military forces during the defense of Rome, so as to be able to negotiate the disarmament of Italian troops and the proclamation of Rome as an "open city" with Field Marshal Albert Kesselring.

When on the 9 September the royal family and the government fled to Brindisi, Sorice chose to stay in Rome, and with him unable to carry out his tasks as minister, Badoglio appointed General Taddeo Orlando as Undersecretary for War, and later (on 11 February 1944) removed him from his position as Minister. In German-occupied Rome, Sorice went into hiding and set up the Clandestine Military Front with Colonel Giuseppe Cordero Lanza di Montezemolo. Sorice remained in Rome until its liberation in June 1944, and in September he was arrested on the orders of the Marshal of Italy Giovanni Messe for having "actively participated in the political life of fascism", but was acquitted of the charge because his effective contribution to the organization of the Resistance after the Armistice.

He was restored to his position of Councilor of State and after the war, along with Marshal Messe, Admiral Alberto Da Zara and General Ettore Musco, was among the founders of "Armata Italiana della Libertà" (Italian Army of Liberty), an anti-Communist paramilitary was joined by some fifty generals and admirals, and of which Sorice was the leader.

Sorice retired from the Army in September 1966 after reaching the age limit, and he died in Rome on January 14, 1971.
