= Rodolfo Torresan =

Italian general (1887–1944)

- Born: 1 November 1887; Padua, Kingdom of Italy
- Died: 22 November 1944 (aged 57); Wolsztyn, Poland
- Military career
- Allegiance: Kingdom of Italy
- Branch: Royal Italian Army
- Service years: 1907–1944
- Rank: Major General
- Commands: 231st Infantry Regiment "Avellino"; 29th Infantry Division Piemonte
- Conflicts: Italo-Turkish War; Battle of the Two Palms; Battle of Rhodes; World War I; Battles of the Isonzo; Spanish Civil War; World War II; Operation Achse
- Awards: Silver Medal of Military Valor (three times); Bronze Medal of Military Valor; Military Order of Savoy; Order of the Crown of Italy; Order of Saints Maurice and Lazarus

Rodolfo Torresan (1 November 1887 – 22 November 1944) was an Italian general during World War II. He was head of the Services Office at the General Staff of the Royal Italian Army for most of the war.

== Biography ==
He was born in Padua on 1 November 1887. After volunteering in the Royal Italian Army, he was assigned to the 14th Infantry Regiment and in 1907 he began to attend the Royal Military Academy of Infantry and Cavalry in Modena as officer cadet, graduating with the rank of infantry second lieutenant on 12 October 1908, assigned to the 57th Infantry Regiment "Abruzzi". After promotion to lieutenant, with the outbreak of the Italo-Turkish War in 1911 he left for Libya, fighting in Cyrenaica, where he distinguished himself in the battle of the Two Palms (3 March 1912), and then participating in the conquest of the Dodecanese, earning a Bronze Medal of Military Valor for his participation in the landing in Rhodes and in the action on Psithos (10 May 1912). He was repatriated in December 1912.

He participated in the First World War, reaching the rank of captain in 1915 and of major in 1917. He was wounded while leading a bayonet charge on Austro-Hungarian positions on the hill of Santa Lucia, near Tolmin, for which he was awarded a Silver Medal of Military Valor. From 10 March to 31 December 1917 he was in command of the 3rd Battalion of the 253rd Infantry Regiment, receiving another Silver Medal of Military Valor for his behaviour at the head of his troops in the fighting near Gorizia.

After the end of the war, in 1919, he was sent again to Libya, remaining there until 1920. He was then made commander of the 2nd Battalion to the 313th Infantry Regiment (from 1 April 1922 to 15 October 1923) and then assigned to the 55th Infantry Regiment. After promotion to lieutenant colonel on 14 August 1926, he attended a staff officer course at the Army School of War from 1926 to 1929. After a period at the staff of the Verona Army Corps, he became Chief of Staff of the 9th Infantry Division Pasubio, stationed in Verona, and from 1 January 1933 was assigned to the command of the Staff Officer corps at the Ministry of War in Rome. In 1935 he became Chief of Staff of the 21st Infantry Division Granatieri di Sardegna, remaining there until the following 16 September. After promotion to colonel on 1 January 1936, he commanded the 231st Infantry Regiment "Avellino" until 15 October 1937, when he was appointed Chief of Staff of the Army Corps of Bolzano, with headquarters in Meran, contribution to the organization and mobilization of the units of the Corpo Truppe Volontarie that would fight in the Spanish Civil War. For this, on 31 July 1939 he was awarded the honor of Knight of the Military Order of Savoy.

In 1939 he became head of the Services Office at the Army General Staff, a post he held for nearly four years, after Italy's entry into World War II (10 June 1940) and promotion to brigadier general (1 January 1941) and major general (5 November 1942). From 15 May 1943 he replaced General Adolfo Naldi at the command of the 29th Infantry Division Piemonte stationed in Patras, in occupied Greece.

Following the Armistice of Cassibile, he was captured by the Germans at his headquarters in Patras on 9 September 1943; he was reportedly arrested in his bathroom, feeling sick after a banquet that had been attended by Italian and German officers on the previous evening. He was sent to Oflag 64/Z in Schokken, Poland, where he arrived on 1 October. During his captivity he repeatedly refused proposals to join the Italian Social Republic; his health quickly deteriorated and on 16 October he was hospitalized in the infirmary of Wolsztyn, where his illness kept worsening until he died on the night of 22 November 1944. He was buried in the Salka cemetery, near a small church and the woods adjacent to the camp itself, after a solemn funeral ceremony. For having kept to his oath and refusing to collaborate with the Nazis and Fascists, at the cost of his life, he was posthumously awarded a third silver medal of military valor.
