= Martyrs of Campo di Marte =

Italian suspected anti-fascist partisans executed in 1944

Execution of the Martyrs of Campo di Marte
- Part of the Italian Civil War
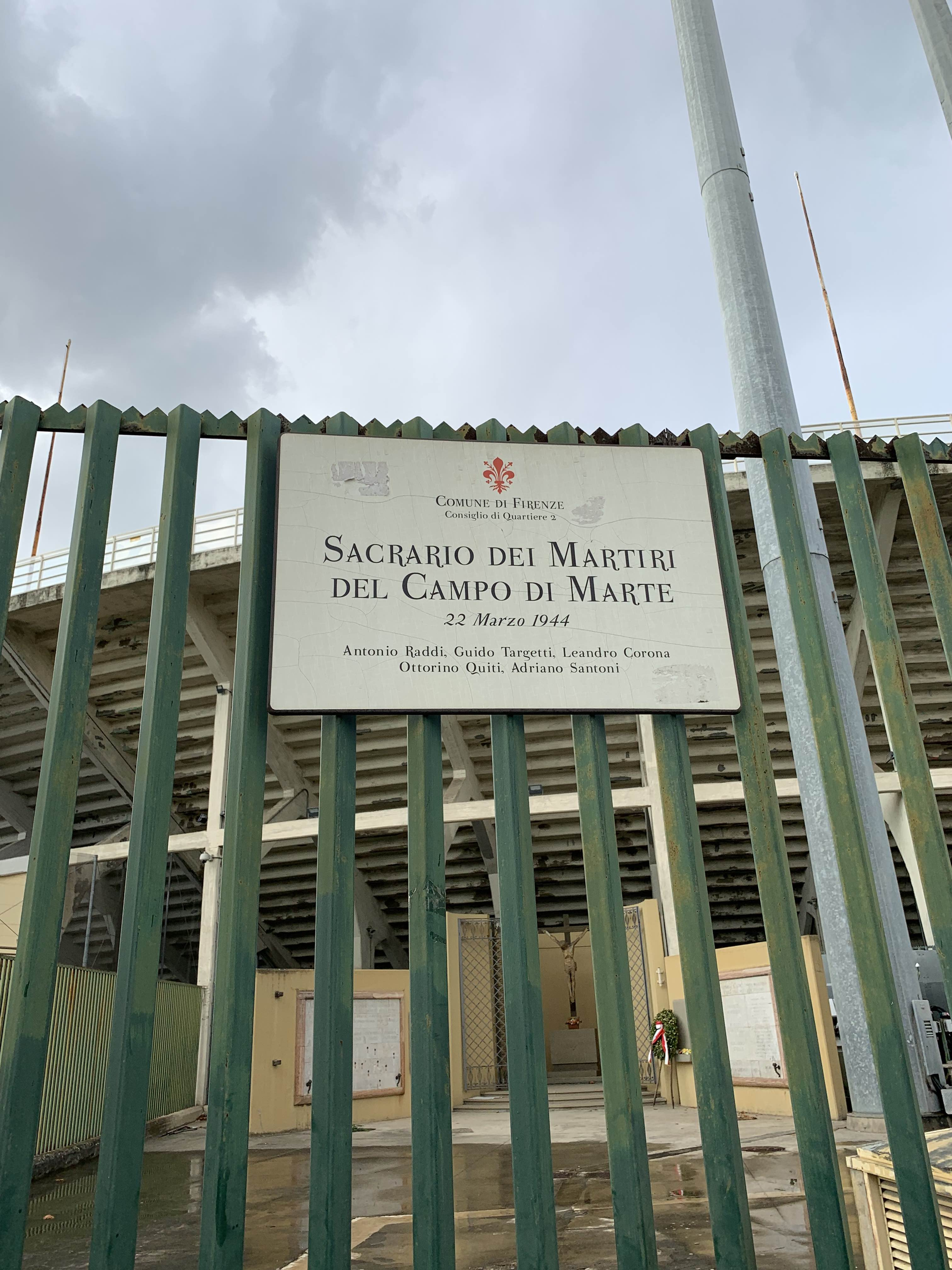
- Memorial to the victims
- Date: 22 March 1944
- Venue: Stadio Giovanni Berta, Campo di Marte, Florence, Italian Social Republic

The Martyrs of Campo di Marte (Italian: Martiri del Campo di Marte) were five men executed in the Campo di Marte borough of Florence by the forces of the Fascist Italian Social Republic (RSI) for refusing to be drafted into the military, and for suspicion of Partisan activity.

== Context ==
After a Partisan attack on the town of Vicchio during which several Fascists were killed on 6 March 1944, the forces of RSI general Enrico Adami Rossi combed the town for Partisan collaborators, discovering in the process five young men who had dodged the military draft imposed by the RSI. They were swiftly condemned to death by the extraordinary military tribunal established the previous month by Rossi, and executed by firing squad ten days later on 22 March.

Several days later on 30 March, the Italian Fascist philosopher Giovanni Gentile received a death threat letter which read:

Tu come esponente del neofascismo sei responsabile dell'assassinio dei cinque giovani al mattino del 22 marzo 1944.
As an exponent of neo-fascism, you are responsible for the murder of the five young men on the morning of 22 March 1944.

Gentile was assassinated by the communist Gruppi di Azione Patriottica shortly afterwards on 15 April.

== List of victims ==
The five men are:

- Antonio Raddi
- Guido Targetti
- Leandro Corona
- Ottorino Quiti
- Adriano Santoni

All were around twenty years old. The five victims were posthumously awarded the Gold Medal for Civil Valor by president Giorgio Napolitano in April 2008. Since Ottorino Quiti had no living next of kin, his medal was accepted by the mayor of Vicchio, Elettra Lorini.
