= Enrico Adami Rossi =

Italian general

- Born: 11 January 1880; Cagliari, Kingdom of Italy
- Died: 12 July 1963 (aged 83); Rome, Italy
- Military career
- Allegiance: Kingdom of Italy; Italian Social Republic
- Branch: Royal Italian Army; National Republican Army
- Rank: Lieutenant General
- Commands: 14th Cavalry Regiment "Cavalleggeri di Alessandria"; 29th Infantry Brigade "Peloritana II"; Florence Territorial Defence; Bari Territorial Defence; Turin Territorial Defence; Tuscany Regional Military Command; Piedmont Regional Military Command
- Conflicts: World War I: Battle of Asiago; Battle of Mount Ortigara; Battle of Vittorio Veneto; World War II
- Awards: Silver Medal of Military Valour; Bronze Medal of Military Valour (twice); War Merit Cross; Order of the Crown of Italy; Order of the German Eagle; Order of the Crown of Thailand; Order of the Redeemer; Order of Prince Danilo I; Order of Saint Anna

Enrico Adami Rossi (11 January 1880 – 12 July 1963) was an Italian general during World War II.

== Biography ==
He participated in the First World War with the rank of cavalry major; serving at the Supreme Command, he distinguished himself in advanced reconnaissance actions, being awarded two Bronze and one Silver Medal of Military Valour for his behaviour in the battles of Asiago, of the Ortigara and of Vittorio Veneto. After the war, he served as Deputy Chief of Staff of the Florence Army Corps from January 1925 to July 1926 and then as Chief of Staff of the Territorial Military Division of Bologna from July 1926 to November 1927. He taught at the Army War School from January 1928 to September 1929 (and later again from September 1932 to October 1933), after which he was given command of the 14th Cavalry Regiment "Cavalleggeri di Alessandria" for three years. In 1935-1936, after promotion to brigadier general, he commanded the 29th Infantry Brigade "Peloritana II", and after its reorganization as a Division he served as deputy commander till January 1938. In September 1938, after promotion to Major General, he assumed command of the Territorial Defence of Florence, which he held till 1941.

In 1941 he was given command of the territorial defense of Bari, where along with General Luigi De Biase (commander of the XI Army Corps, with headquarters in Bari) he conducted the internal investigation launched by the Royal Italian Army on the conduct of General Nicola Bellomo for the facts of Torre Tresca (the killing of a fugitive British prisoner of war), which resulted in his exoneration. On 11 January 1942 he was transferred to the Army reserve due to his age, and was again given command of the territorial defense of Florence; in April he was promoted to Lieutenant General. On 11 July 1943 he was appointed commander of the territorial defense of Turin. After the fall of Fascism on 25 July 1943 he refused any co-operation with anti-Fascist parties and harshly applied the directives issued by Pietro Badoglio and Mario Roatta for the restoration of public order; on 1 August he ordered the political prisoners who had been released from prison after the fall of the regime to surrender themselves to the authorities to be taken again into custody (among them were Communist leader Dante Conti and Socialist Giuseppe Saragat, who were thus arrested again).

After the proclamation of the Armistice of Cassibile on 8 September 1943, Adami Rossi, in charge of the Turin Fortress Area, kept his men confined in the barracks, rejected the requests by the anti-Fascist parties to participate in the defense of the city against the Germans, refused to hand over weapons to the civilian population, and made contact with the Germans, handing them over the city on 9 September without any resistance. He then joined the Italian Social Republic and on 11 November 1943 he was appointed regional military commander of Tuscany and commander of the territorial defense of Florence. In February 1944 he set up the extraordinary military tribunal, of which he became president; in March 1944 this tribunal sentenced to death the Martyrs of Campo di Marte, five young draft dodgers and suspected partisans who were rounded up in Vicchio after a partisan attack in which several Fascist sympathizers had been killed.

On 5 April 1945 he was appointed head of the Piedmont Regional Military Command, and in early May he was taken prisoner by U.S. troops and imprisoned in the Coltano prisoner-of-war camp. During his captivity there his testimony was required by General Bellomo during his trial for the events of Torre Tresca, but he was not allowed to testify. Adami Rossi was in turn tried by the Court of Assizes of Florence, which found him guilty of collaborationism for having favored the establishment of extraordinary military courts; he was initially sentenced to death and to the confiscation of all assets in May 1946, but the sentence was overturned in the Supreme Court. A second trial in November 1947 resulted in him being sentenced to twenty-four years in prison, while another parallel trial sentenced him to three years in prison for not resisting the Germans in Turin after the armistice of 8 September 1943. However, the sentenced was later reduced to two years and he was released in February 1948. On November 19, 1953, he was ultimately acquitted by the Supreme Court of Cassation and reinstated in rank, also obtaining the restitution of his assets. He later became national consultant of the National Union of Combatants of the Italian Social Republic. His name appears on the CROWCASS list of individuals wanted by Great Britain for war crimes.

He died in Rome in 1963.
