= Ettore Musco =

Italian general

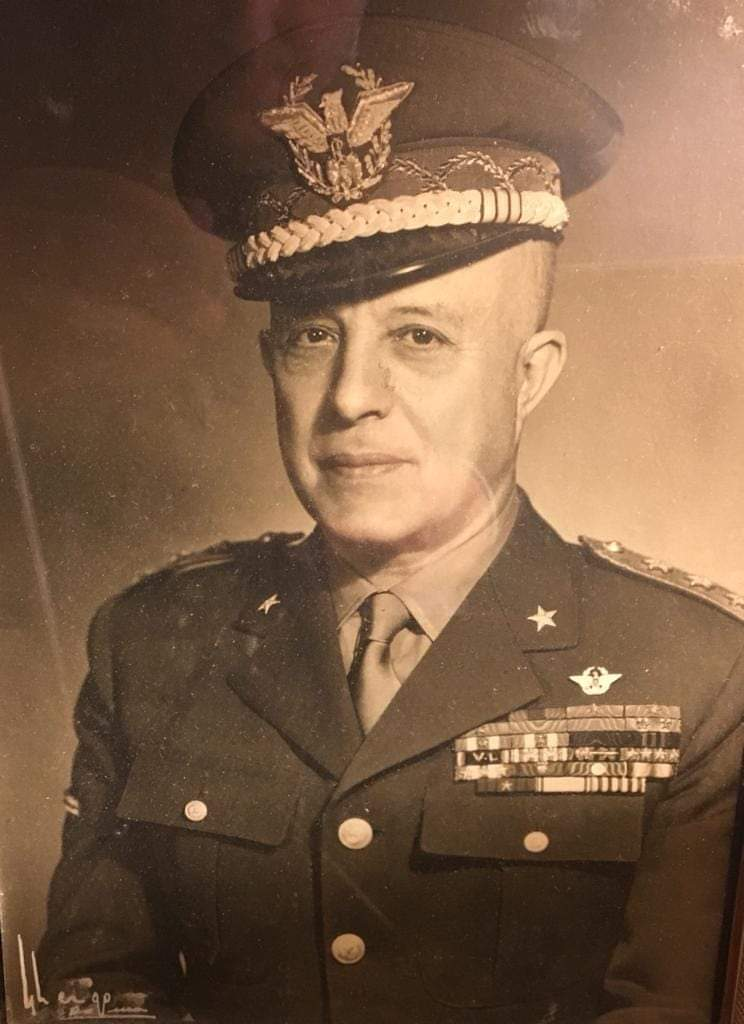
- Born: 14 February 1889; Naples, Kingdom of Italy
- Died: 2 September 1990 (aged 101); Rome, Italy
- Military career
- Allegiance: Kingdom of Italy; Italy
- Branch: Royal Italian Army; Italian Army
- Service years: 1914–1963
- Rank: Lieutenant General
- Commands: 21st Infantry Regiment; SIFAR; Mechanized Division "Folgore"; Third Army
- Conflicts: World War I; Western Front; Second Italo-Ethiopian War; World War II; Italian occupation of Yugoslavia; Italian campaign
- Awards: Silver Medal of Military Valor (three times); War Cross of Military Valor (twice); Military Order of Italy; Order of Merit of the Italian Republic; Legion of Merit

Ettore Musco (14 February 1889 – 2 September 1990) was an Italian general, head of the SIFAR from 1952 to 1955.

== Biography ==
He was born into an ancient noble family hailing from Calabria, the Barons Musco, who had settled in Caulonia since the first half of the 16th century; among his ancestors were philosopher Gaetano Filangieri and Bourbon general Carlo Filangieri. After attending the Nunziatella Military School in Naples from 1914 to 1917, on 5 June 1917 he volunteered for the Royal Italian Army in the First World War, where he was wounded on the Western front and awarded a Silver Medal of Military Valor and a War Cross for Military Valor. He then continued his career in the Army and in 1936 he volunteered for the Second Italo-Ethiopian War, where he was awarded another Silver and a Bronze Medal of Military Valor as well as a further War Cross for Military Valor.

During the Second World War, with the rank of lieutenant colonel, he was chief of staff of the 13th Infantry Division Re, fighting in Croatia and later transferred to Rome. Following the Armistice of Cassibile and the German occupation of Italy, he joined the Clandestine Military Front until the liberation of Rome, after which he rejoined the Italian Co-belligerent Army where he reorganized and commanded the 21st Infantry Regiment of the "Cremona" Combat Group. He was seriously wounded during the Italian campaign and awarded the Knight's Cross of the Military Order of Italy by the Italian government, and the Legion of Merit by the United States government.

In 1946 Musco, having been promoted to colonel, was entrusted with the reorganization of the intelligence services of the newly established Italian Republic. In 1947, he founded the Armata Italiana della Libertà (Italian Army of Liberty), a secret anti-Communist organization founded in 1947 which later provided the framework for Operation Gladio.

After promotion to brigadier general, Musco led the Italian military secret service, the SIFAR, from 1952 to December 1955, when he was replaced by Giovanni De Lorenzo on the recommendation of the President of the Republic Giovanni Gronchi, and despite the contrary opinion of Musco himself. He was then promoted to major general and given command of the Mechanized Division "Folgore". In 1958 he was promoted to lieutenant general, and in 1959, he was appointed commander-designate of the Third Army. In 1963 he retired from the Army and was awarded the honor of Knight of the Grand Cross of the Order of Merit of the Italian Republic by President Antonio Segni.

A scholar of military problems, he was the author of several books of military history, including La verità sull’8 settembre 1943, published in 1976. He had six children. He died in Rome in 1990, at age 101.
