= Felice Caperdoni =

Italian general (1889–1955)

- Born: 28 August 1889; Bergamo, Kingdom of Italy
- Died: 14 April 1955 (aged 65); Montù Beccaria, Italy
- Military career
- Allegiance: Kingdom of Italy
- Branch: Royal Italian Army
- Rank: Brigadier General
- Commands: Military garrison of Foggia
- Conflicts: World War I; Battles of the Isonzo; Battle of the Piave; Second Italo-Senussi War; World War II; Operation Achse
- Awards: Silver Medal of Military Valour; Bronze Medal of Military Valour

Felice Caperdoni (Bergamo, 28 August 1889 – Montù Beccaria, 13 April 1955) was an Italian general during World War II.

== Biography ==
He was born in Bergamo in 1889 and fought in the First World War as a captain in the "Macerata" Infantry Brigade, earning a Silver and a Bronze Medal of Military Valor for actions during the Fourth and Sixth Battle of the Isonzo and being wounded on the Piave.

During the interwar period he participated in the pacification of Libya, serving under Rodolfo Graziani with the rank of lieutenant colonel, and by 1934 he held the rank of colonel.

During the Second World War, with the rank of Brigadier General, he initially commanded the coastal defense of the western Ligurian Riviera. He was later appointed commander of the military garrison of Foggia. On 22 July 1943 he was slightly wounded in the collapse of an air raid shelter during one of the heaviest raids of the bombing campaign against Foggia.

On 9 September 1943 German troops entered Foggia in the chaos that followed the proclamation of the Armistice of Cassibile and the start of Operation Achse, quickly seizing all key points of the city. A German delegation then demanded Caperdoni to surrender; convinced that resistance would be futile, the general complied, ordering his men to lay down their arms, and then shot himself in the head. The bullet did not kill him, but left him permanently blinded. He was taken to the city's hospital, where he was treated by German medical officers and later, after the liberation of Foggia on 1 October, by the Allies.

After the war he retired with his wife in Montù Beccaria, where he committed suicide on 13 April 1955.
