= Luigi Marchesi (soldier) =

Italian military officer (1910–1997)

- Born: 16 July 1910; Turin, Kingdom of Italy
- Died: 16 June 1997 (aged 86); Turin, Italy
- Military career
- Allegiance: Kingdom of Italy
- Branch: Royal Italian Army
- Rank: General
- Conflicts: World War II; Battle of the Western Alps; Axis invasion of Yugoslavia

Luigi Marchesi (Turin, 16 July 1910 – 16 June 1997) was an officer in the Royal Italian Army during World War II, most notable for his involvement in the events surrounding the Armistice of Cassibile.

== Biography ==
Marchesi was born in Turin in 1910, the son of a colonel of the Royal Italian Army. After entering the Military Academy of Modena in 1928, he graduated in 1931 with the rank of second lieutenant of the Alpini corps, and served for several years as ski instructor in the "Fenestrelle" Battalion of the 3rd Alpini Regiment in the Western Alps. In 1937 he enrolled at the Army War School in Turin, being the youngest officer to be ever admitted to its courses, becoming part of the Army General Staff in 1940. In the spring of the same year, thanks to his knowledge of German, he served as liaison officer attached to the Oberkommando der Wehrmacht in Berlin during the battle of France; he was present on the front of the German First Army as it breached the Maginot Line, witnessing the capture of a French outpost by German tanks near Metz. Returning to Italy, with the rank of captain he briefly served at the headquarters of the II Army Corps during the battle of the Western Alps in June 1940, after which he was assigned to the operations office of the 2nd Army, with headquarters in Gorizia. There he became the personal secretary and adjutant of General Vittorio Ambrosio, commander of the Second Army, following him when he became Chief of Staff of the Royal Italian Army in 1942 and Chief of the General Staff in 1943.

In the summer of that year, with the rank of major, he participated in the negotiations held in Cassibile for the stipulation of an armistice between Italy and the Allies, was present at its signature by General Giuseppe Castellano (whom Marchesi knew and worked with since 1940, when they both worked at the operations office of the Second Army) on 3 September, and on 5 September he left for Rome where he delivered some documents to Ambrosio (a copy of the "short armistice" and one of the "long armistice", instructions for the departure of Italian warships and merchant ships towards Allied-controlled ports, instructions for the air force and sabotage operations, a memorandum for the intelligence service, the order of operations of the American airborne division that was to be launched on Rome, and a letter from General Castellano), to whom he also reported what Castellano had instructed him to say, that is, that the armistice could have been declared between 10 and 15 September, probably on 12 September.

On 7 September Marchesi, together with Colonel Giorgio Salvi (the Chief of Staff of General Giacomo Carboni, in command of the defense of Rome), welcomed American general Maxwell Taylor and colonel William Tudor Gardiner to Palazzo Caprara, seat of the Ministry of War; the two officers had come to talk with General Carboni and the head of the Italian government, Marshal of Italy Pietro Badoglio, about the preparations for Operation Giant II, the launch of the 82nd Airborne Division near Rome to support the Italian garrison and hold the capital against German attacks after the proclamation of the armistice, which was scheduled to take place on the following day. As the Italian commands were unprepared to provide support to the airborne troops, as they had expected (based on Castellano's declarations) to have more time to prepare, the talks led to the cancellation of Giant II.

After General Dwight Eisenhower announced the signature of the armistice on a radio broadcast from Radio Algiers at 18:30 on 8 September, Marchesi was among the participants of a hastily summoned Council of the Crown held at the Quirinale Palace, along with Ambrosio, Badoglio, Carboni, King Victor Emmanuel III, Minister of War Antonio Sorice, Navy Chief of Staff Raffaele de Courten, Air Force Chief of Staff Renato Sandalli, Army Deputy Chief of Staff Giuseppe De Stefanis (standing in for the absent Chief of Staff Mario Roatta, who was having a meeting with German General Siegfried Westphal), Foreign Minister Raffaele Guariglia, Minister of the Royal House Pietro Acquarone, and General Paolo Puntoni, aide-de-camp of the King. Worried about the German reaction, Carboni suggested to disavow the armistice and blame it on Badoglio's initiative, claiming that he had acted without informing the king and government, and to continue the war alongside Germany; Marchesi, despite being by far the lowest ranking among those present, replied pointing out that such an action would be against all rules of military honor, would cause an extremely harsh Allied reaction, and would be useless as the Allies were in possession of all documents pertaining the negotiations that had led to the armistice and about its signature, and could thus easily disprove any claims about it being made without the knowledge of the king and government. After Marchesi's speech, Carboni's proposal was rejected, and the council ended with the decision that Badoglio would make a radio broadcast confirming the news of the armistice to the Italian population and armed forces. Marchesi then joined the king, Badoglio, Ambrosio, De Courten, Sandalli and other high-ranking members of the government and of the armed forces in their flight towards Pescara and from there, after boarding the corvette Baionetta, to Brindisi.

In his works about the Armistice, journalist and historian Ruggero Zangrandi judged negatively the activities and contribution of Major Marchesi to the events of the armistice; Zangrandi defined him as an "obscure character", connected to the most mysterious events of the period: depositary of the clandestine radio brought from Castellano to Rome on 27 August, present on 3 September in Cassibile, bearer of the mysterious letter from Castellano to Ambrosio with the date of proclamation of the armistice. The major also welcomed General Maxwell Taylor in Ambrosio's absence, and decrypted, transmitted and received the messages between Badoglio and Eisenhower on the morning of 8 September; moreover it was he who received from Ambrosio the instructions for the flight towards Pescara between 03.00 and 03.45 of 9 September. With regard to the Council of the Crown held on 8 September, Zangrandi noted that the presence of Marchesi was expressly requested by Ambrosio who was the only one, together with Badoglio, aware of the details of the negotiations, of the armistice clauses and of the very short timeframe for its planned implementation. Faced with the surprise and grievances of the other participants, unaware of many details, according to Zangrandi Ambrosio had Major Marchesi intervene "artfully", with the pretext of reading a supposed last part of General Eisenhower's radiogram – ostensibly just arrived, while in reality it had already arrived before and had been read by both Badoglio and Ambrosio –, dramatically raising the question of the need for immediate acceptance of the armistice clauses, thus overcoming the resistance of the other members of the Council. Therefore, according to Zangrandi, Major Marchesi's intervention was not spontaneous and the result of his exasperation due to the slowness of the decisions, but a maneuver concocted by Ambrosio to convince the participants to immediately accept the armistice, of which they had only come to know in that moment. Moreover, the participation and role of Marchesi are not even mentioned in the testimonies of Badoglio, Acquarone and De Stefanis, while Ambrosio explicitly stated that it was he who asked Marchesi to intervene.

Other historians, such as Carlo De Risio, instead give a positive evaluation of Marchesi's role. The aforementioned version by Zangrandi is not shared by the memoirs of Paolo Puntoni and Raffaele de Courten, as well as by most other authors who wrote about the Armistice, including Indro Montanelli, Paolo Monelli, Renzo Trionfera, Domenico Bartoli, Silvio Bertoldi and Elena Aga Rossi.

During the co-belligerence between Italy and the Allies, Marchesi coordinated military espionage operations in German-occupied Italy, heading the 810th Italian Service Squadron, directly subordinated to the British Intelligence Service and the Allied Forces Headquarters. He retired from active service in July 1945, after the end of the hostilities in Europe, and subsequently rose to the rank of general in the reserve. In 1969 his memoirs were published under the title of Come siamo arrivati a Brindisi (How we got to Brindisi). He later published another book on the same matter, Dall'impreparazione alla resa incondizionata (From unpreparedness to unconditional surrender). He died in 1997, at age 86.
