= Salka =

Village and municipality in Slovakia

Salka Ipolyszalka
- Municipality
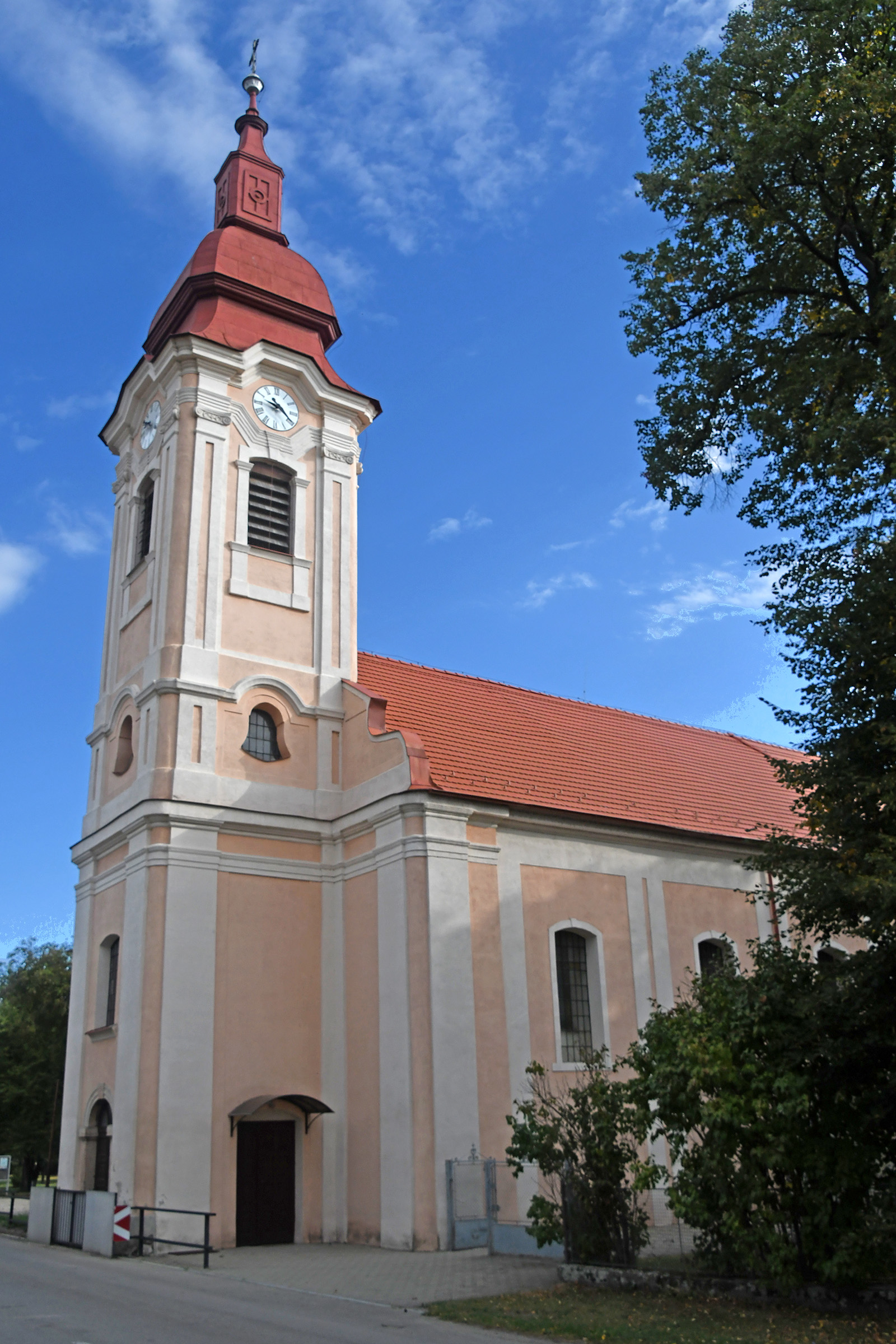

- Flag

- Location of Salka in the Nitra Region Location of Salka in Slovakia
- Coordinates: 47.88°N 18.77°E
- Country: Slovakia
- Region: Nitra Region
- District: Nové Zámky District
- First mentioned: 1156

Area
  - Total: 26.25 km^{2} (10.14 sq mi)
- Elevation: 110 m (360 ft)

Population (2025)
  - Total: 994
- Time zone: UTC+1 (CET)
  - Summer (DST): UTC+2 (CEST)
- Postal code: 943 61
- Area code: +421 36
- Vehicle registration plate (until 2022): NZ
- Website: www.obecsalka.sk

Salka (Hungarian: Ipolyszalka) is a village and municipality in the Nové Zámky District in the Nitra Region of south-west Slovakia.

== History ==
In historical records the village was first mentioned in 1156.

== Geography ==
The municipality lies at an altitude of 110 metres (360 ft) and covers an area of 26.25 km^{2} (10.14 sq mi) (2025).

== Population ==
Population statistic (10 years)
Year	1995	2005	2015	2025
Count	1112	1052	1004	994
Difference		−5.39%	−4.56%	−0.99%

Population statistic
Year	2024	2025
Count	983	994
Difference		+1.11%

It has a population of 994 people (31 December 2025).

=== Ethnicity ===
Census 2021 (1+ %)
Ethnicity	Number	Fraction
Hungarian	865	88.8%
Slovak	100	10.26%
Not found out	69	7.08%
Total	974	

In year 2021 was 974 people by ethnicity 865 as Hungarian, 100 as Slovak, 69 as Not found out, 8 as Czech, 1 as Russian and 1 as German.

Note on population: The difference values of population numbers in the table "Population statistic" and in the sections "Ethnicity" & "Religion" is caused by the use of various statistical methods.

=== Religion ===
Census 2021 (1+ %)
Religion	Number	Fraction
Roman Catholic Church	795	81.62%
Not found out	75	7.7%
None	65	6.67%
Calvinist Church	17	1.75%
Total	974	

In year 2021 was 974 people by religion 795 from Roman Catholic Church, 75 from Not found out, 65 from None, 17 from Calvinist Church, 9 from Greek Catholic Church, 5 from Christian Congregations in Slovakia, 3 from Evangelical Church, 2 from Other and not ascertained christian church, 2 from Jehovah's Witnesses and 1 from Other.

== Facilities ==
The village has a small public library, a gym and a football pitch.
