= 29th Infantry Division "Piemonte" =

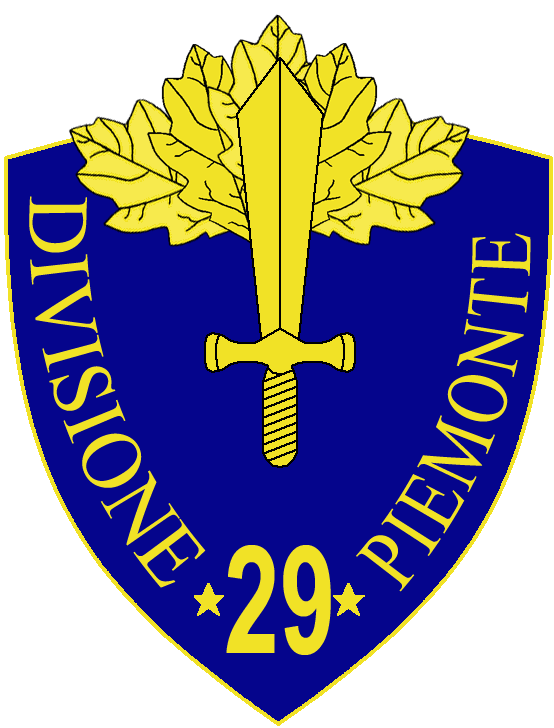
- 29th Infantry Division "Piemonte" insignia
- Active: 1934–11 September 1943
- Country: Kingdom of Italy
- Branch: Royal Italian Army
- Type: Infantry
- Size: Division
- Engagements: Second Italo-Ethiopian War; World War II: Greco-Italian War; Operation Achse

Commanders
- Notable commanders: Armellini Chiappi (1939–1940); Rodolfo Torresan (1943)

Insignia
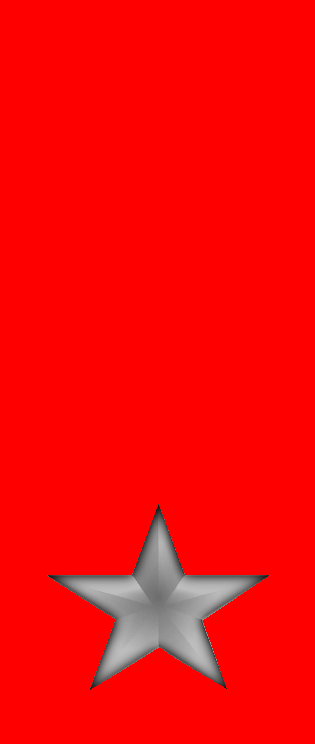
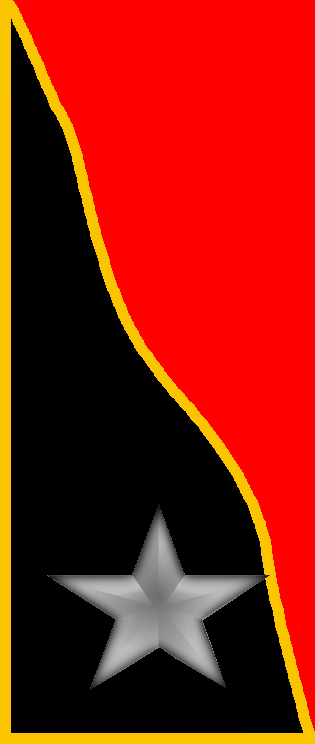
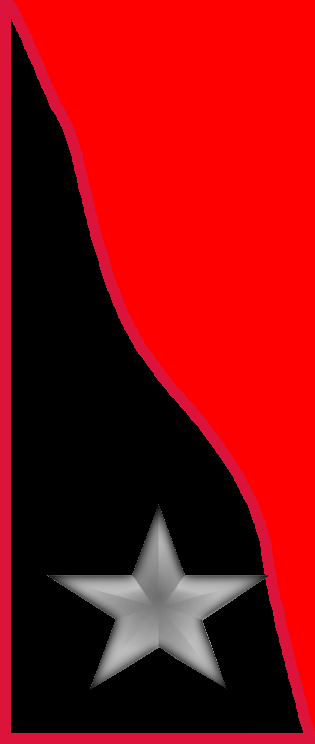
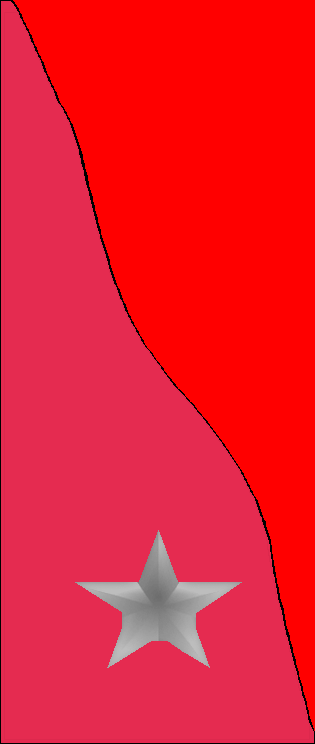
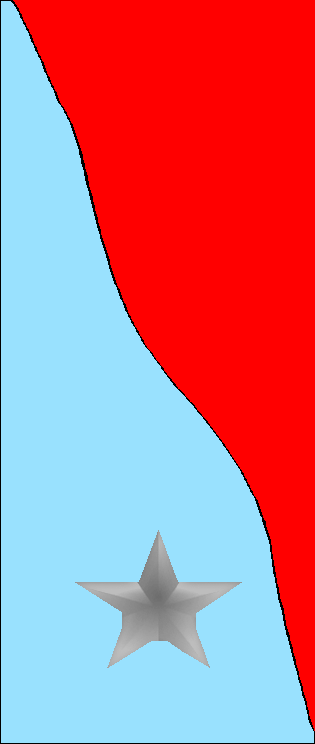
- Identification symbol: Piemonte Division gorget patches

The 29th Infantry Division "Piemonte" (Italian: 29ª Divisione di fanteria "Piemonte") was an infantry division of the Royal Italian Army during World War II. The division was garrisoned in Messina on Sicily and recruited primarily on the island. The division was in Greece when the Armistice of Cassibile was announced on 8 September 1943 and dissolved by German forces three days later.

== History ==
The division's lineage begins with the Brigade "Piemonte" established in 1815, which on 25 October 1831 split to form the 1st and 2nd infantry regiments under the brigade's command. On 4 May 1839 the two regiments were re-numbered as 3rd and 4th infantry regiments.

=== World War I ===
The brigade fought on the Italian front in World War I. In November 1926, the brigade assumed the name of XXIX Infantry Brigade and received the 75th Infantry Regiment "Napoli". The brigade was the infantry component of the 29th Territorial Division of Messina, which also included the 24th Artillery Regiment. In 1934 the division changed its name to 29th Infantry Division "Peloritana".

=== Second Italo-Ethiopian War ===
On 28 February 1935, the Peloritana was mobilized for the upcoming Second Italo-Ethiopian War and sailed to Somalia on 5 March 1935. The division was initially tasked with the defence of the coastal cities of Mogadishu, Merca and Kismayo. The division entered combat in March 1936, seizing Harar on the Erer River. In the final Italian advance in April 1936, the division was relegated to second-line duties. After the war's conclusion, the Peloritana remained in Harar and fought remnants of Ethiopian forces and resistance fighters in the cities of Jijiga, Dire Dawa, Kombolcha and the Amhara region before returning to Italy.

From March 1935 to December 1936, while the Peloritana Division was in Africa, the division's depots continued to train conscripts, who were used to temporarily reform the 146th Infantry Regiment "Catania", 222nd Infantry Regiment "Jonio", 224th Infantry Regiment "Etna", and 52nd Artillery Regiment, which were all assigned to the temporarily formed 129th Infantry Division "Peloritana II". After the 29th Infantry Division "Peloritana" returned from Ethiopia the 129th Infantry Division "Peloritana II" and its regiments were disbanded and their personnel transferred to the regiments returning from their war.

On 15 April 1939, the 75th Infantry Regiment "Napoli" was transferred to the newly activated 54th Infantry Division "Napoli" and, on the same date, the XXIX Infantry Brigade was dissolved, and the two remaining infantry regiments came under the direct command of the division, which changed its name to the 29th Infantry Division "Piemonte".

=== World War II ===
In September 1940, in preparation for the Greco-Italian War, the Piemonte moved from Sicily to Albania. It was part of the Italian forces' strategic reserve in Korçë and Pogradec District. On 13 November 1940, four battalions of the division entered the frontline against Greek forces near Qafa e Qarrit, just as the Italian front began to crumble. The majority of the division's units did not leave Pogradec District until March 1941, when the division was moved to Këlcyrë and took up positions in the Tomorrica valley behind the 4th Alpine Division "Cuneense". The Piemonte participated in defensive fighting at Bregas. On 13 April 1941, the Piemonte division started to advance and, after skirmishing with Greek rearguards, reached Ersekë on the Greek border. After the war, the division was temporarily based in Korçë before moving in June 1941 to the Peloponnese peninsula, along the Corinth Canal. The division garrisoned Patras, Aigio, Paralia Platanos, Pyrgos, while battalion-strength detachments were on Zakynthos island and in Nafplio. After the announcement of the Armistice of Cassibile on 8 September 1943, the division was dissolved by attacking German forces on 11 September 1943.

== Organization ==
=== Second Italo-Ethiopian War 1935 ===
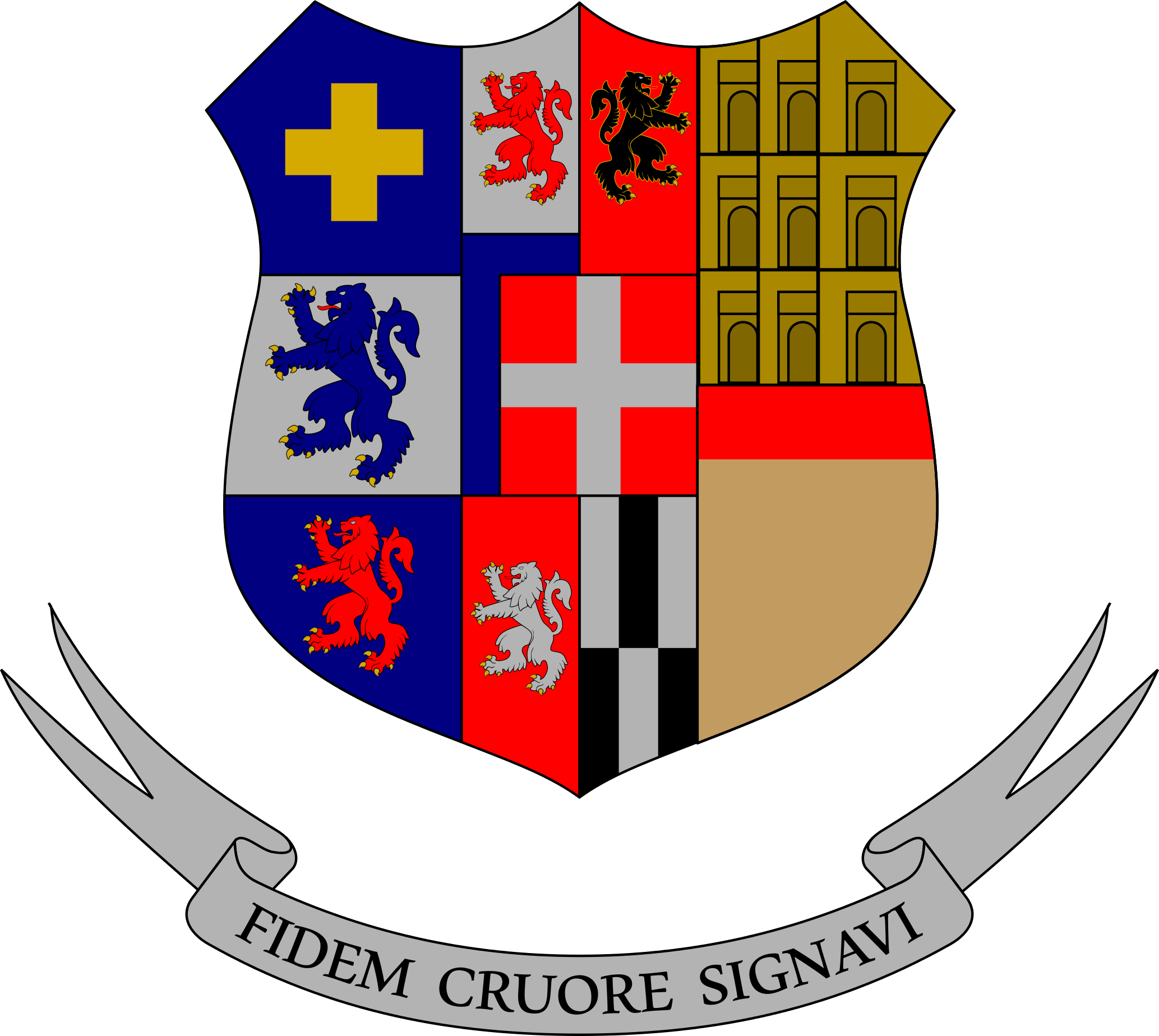
Coat of Arms of the 3rd Infantry Regiment "Piemonte", 1939

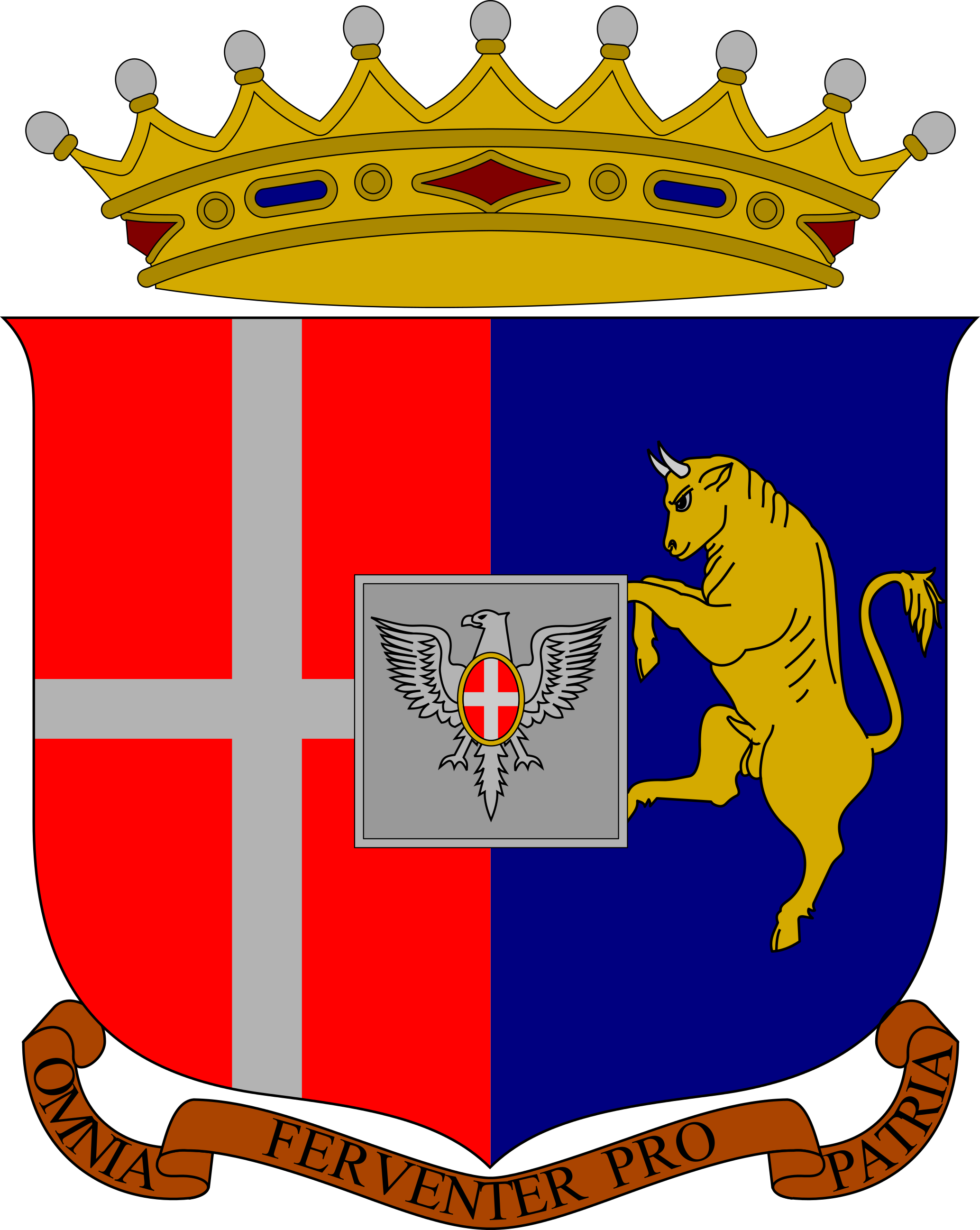
Coat of Arms of the 4th Infantry Regiment "Piemonte", 1939

- 29th Infantry Division "Peloritana"
- 3rd Infantry Regiment "Piemonte"
- 4th Infantry Regiment "Piemonte"
- 75th Infantry Regiment "Napoli"
- 24th Artillery Regiment "Peloritana"
- 529th Machine Gun Battalion
- 29th Replacements Battalion
- 29th Engineer Company

Each Army Division had a Pack-Mules unit of 3000 mules and three Regimental Trucks units (20 light trucks each).

=== World War II ===
The 29th Infantry Division "Piemonte" was one of three infantry divisions which recruited in Sicily. It mainly drafted men from eastern Sicily and had its headquarters in Messina. Its two infantry regiments were based in Messina (3rd) and Catania (4th), with the division's artillery regiment also based in Messina. The 166th CC.NN. Legion and CLXVI CC.NN. Battalion were recruited in Messina, and the CLXVII CC.NN. Battalion in Catania. The division's 303rd Infantry Regiment was raised by the 3rd Infantry Regiment's depot in Messina on 1 November 1941.

29th Infantry Division "Piemonte" organization in 1940

- 29th Infantry Division "Piemonte", in Messina
  - Headquarters
    - Command Company
    - 128th Carabinieri Section
    - 129th Carabinieri Section
    - 82nd Field Post Office
    - 29th Infantry Division Command Transport Squad
  - 3rd Infantry Regiment "Piemonte", in Messina
    - Command Company
    - 3 × Fusilier battalions
    - Support Weapons Battery (65/17 mod. 13 infantry support guns)
    - Mortar Company (81mm Mod. 35 mortars)
  - 4th Infantry Regiment "Piemonte", in Catania
    - Command Company
    - 3 × Fusilier battalions
    - Support Weapons Battery (65/17 mod. 13 infantry support guns)
    - Mortar Company (81mm Mod. 35 mortars)
  - 303rd Infantry Regiment "Piemonte" (formed in Messina on 1 November 1941)
    - Command Company
    - 3 × Fusilier battalions
    - Cannons Company (47/32 mod. 35 anti-tank guns)
    - Mortar Company (81mm Mod. 35 mortars)
  - 24th Artillery Regiment "Piemonte", in Messina
    - Command Unit
    - I Group with (100/17 mod. 14 howitzers)
    - II Group with (75/27 mod. 11 field guns; transferred in September 1940 to the 22nd Artillery Regiment "Aosta")
    - II Group with (75/13 mod. 15 mountain guns; transferred in September 1940 from the 22nd Artillery Regiment "Aosta")
    - III Group with (75/13 mod. 15 mountain guns)
    - 1 × Anti-aircraft battery (20/65 mod. 35 anti-aircraft guns)
    - Ammunition and Supply Unit
  - XXIX Mortar Battalion (81mm Mod. 35 mortars)
  - 29th Anti-tank Company (47/32 mod. 35 anti-tank guns)
  - 29th Telegraph and Radio Operators Company
  - 7th Engineer Company
  - Medical Section
    - 3 × Field hospitals
    - 1 × Surgical unit
  - 1 × Supply Section
  - 1 × Autocarrette Section
  - 1 × Transport Section

Attached to the division from early 1941:

- 166th CC.NN. Legion "Peloro", in Messina
  - CLXVI CC.NN. Battalion
  - CLXVII CC.NN. Battalion
  - 166th CC.NN. Machine Gun Company

The division was reinforced in 1943 by the following units:

- LXII Army Corps Artillery Group

== Commanding officers ==
The division's commanding officers were:

- Generale di Divisione Armellini Chiappi (15 April 1939 - 9 June 1940)
- Generale di Divisione Giovanni Cerio (10 June 1940 - 15 July 1940)
- Generale di Divisione Adolfo Naldi (16 July 1940 - 14 April 1943)
- Generale di Divisione Rodolfo Torresan (15 April 1943 - 11 September 1943)
