= Paolo Puntoni =

Italian general

- Born: 16 March 1889; Pisa, Kingdom of Italy
- Died: 19 January 1967 (aged 77); Rome, Italy
- Military career
- Allegiance: Kingdom of Italy
- Branch: Royal Italian Army
- Rank: Major General
- Commands: 78th Infantry Regiment "Lupi di Toscana"; 1st Alpine Division Taurinense
- Conflicts: Italo-Turkish War; World War I; World War II
- Awards: Bronze Medal of Military Valour

Paolo Puntoni (16 March 1889 in Pisa – 19 January 1967 in Rome) was an Italian general, who served as aide-de-camp to King Victor Emmanuel III during World War II.

== Biography ==
Puntoni was born into a wealthy family, the son of Vittorio Puntoni, a renowned professor of ancient Greek and rector of the University of Bologna. After completing his high school studies in Bologna, he attended the Military Academy of Modena, graduating in 1909 with the rank of second lieutenant of the Alpini. He fought in the Italo-Turkish War as lieutenant in the 6th Alpini Regiment, earning a Bronze Medal of Military Valour, and in the First World War with the rank of captain and later major; after World War I, between 1922 and 1923 he studied law at the University of Bologna. During the interwar period he served as chief of staff of the Bologna Territorial Division, commander of the 78th Infantry Regiment "Lupi di Toscana" and chief of staff of the Alessandria Army Corps. He was promoted to brigadier general and then to major general, and from September 1938 to January 1939 he commanded the 1st Alpine Division Taurinense.

In January 1939 he was personally chosen by King Victor Emmanuel III of Savoy as his aide-de-camp, and on the following year he became first aide-de-camp to the king. In this capacity, he became the person who was closest to the sovereign, closer even than the Minister of the Royal House, Pietro d'Acquarone. Puntoni was the only "witness" of the last meeting between the king and Mussolini which took place at Villa Savoia on 25 July 1943, which ended with the arrest of the Duce, overhearing their conversation from the adjacent room. After the arrest of the dictator, the fall of Fascism and the Armistice of Cassibile, on 8 September 1943 Puntoni followed the King in his flight from Rome to Brindisi, of which he was one of the organizers.

With the end of the Second World War and the abolition of monarchy in Italy, Puntoni resigned from active service in 1946 and retired to private life. During the period in which he had lived in close contact with Victor Emmanuel, he wrote a diary which was published between 13 September 1956 and 21 January 1957 by the newspaper Il Tempo in twenty-one episodes, and then in 1958 in book form by the publisher Palazzi, with the title Parla Vittorio Emanuele III (Victor Emmanuel III speaks). The diary has been considered by historians a very useful tool for understanding the attitudes, moods and hopes of the Savoy monarchy during the war period.

Puntoni died in Rome in 1967.
