= Military ranks of the Kingdom of Italy =

The Military ranks of the Kingdom of Italy were the military insignia used by the Italian Armed Forces when Italy was the Kingdom of Italy (1861–1946). During the World Wars, the Carabinieri, as the then-most senior corps of the Army, wore similar insignia to those used by the rest of the service.

== Special insignia ==
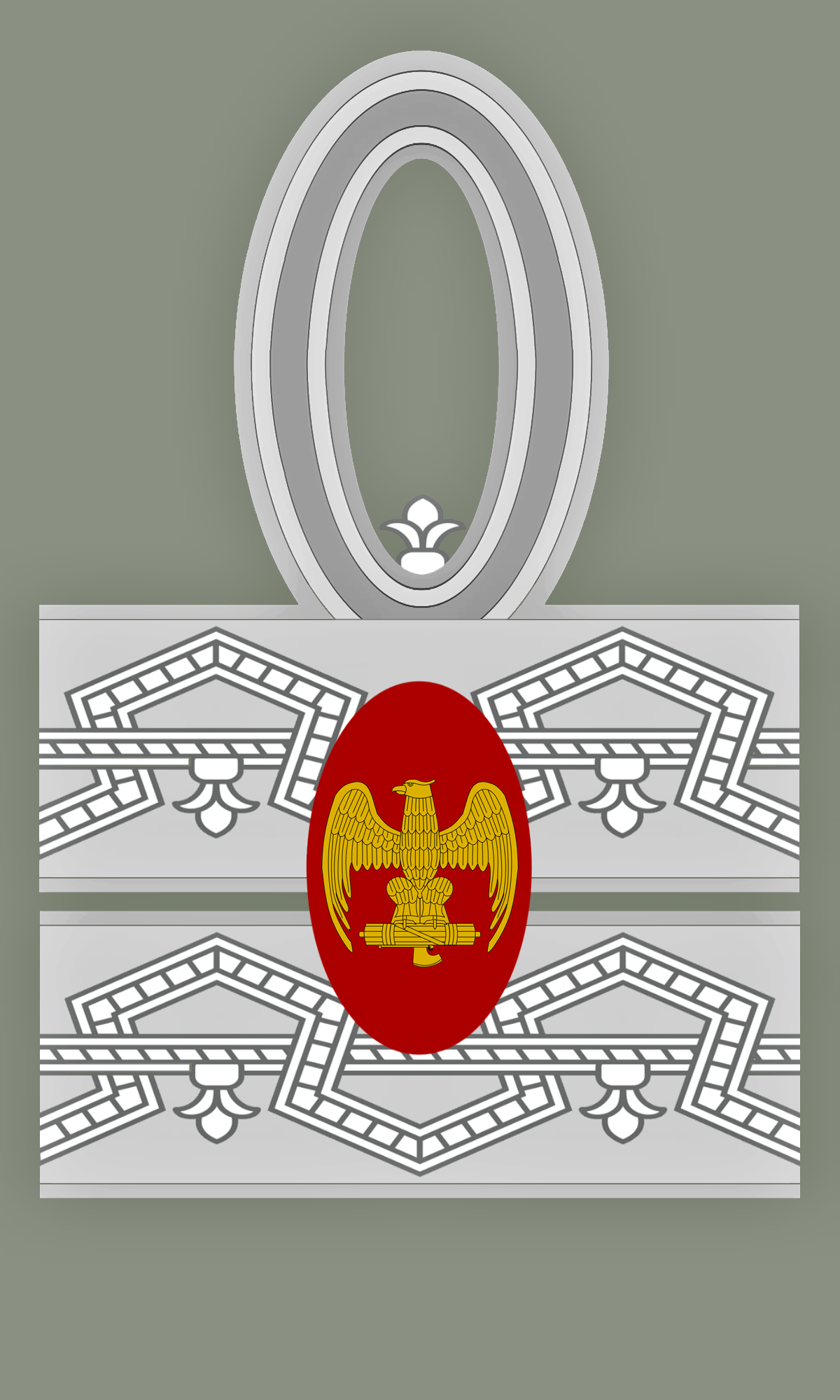
Rank group	Honorary
Primo Maresciallo dell'Impero
First marshal of the empire

== Royal Italian Army ==
=== Commissioned officer ranks ===
The rank insignia of commissioned officers.

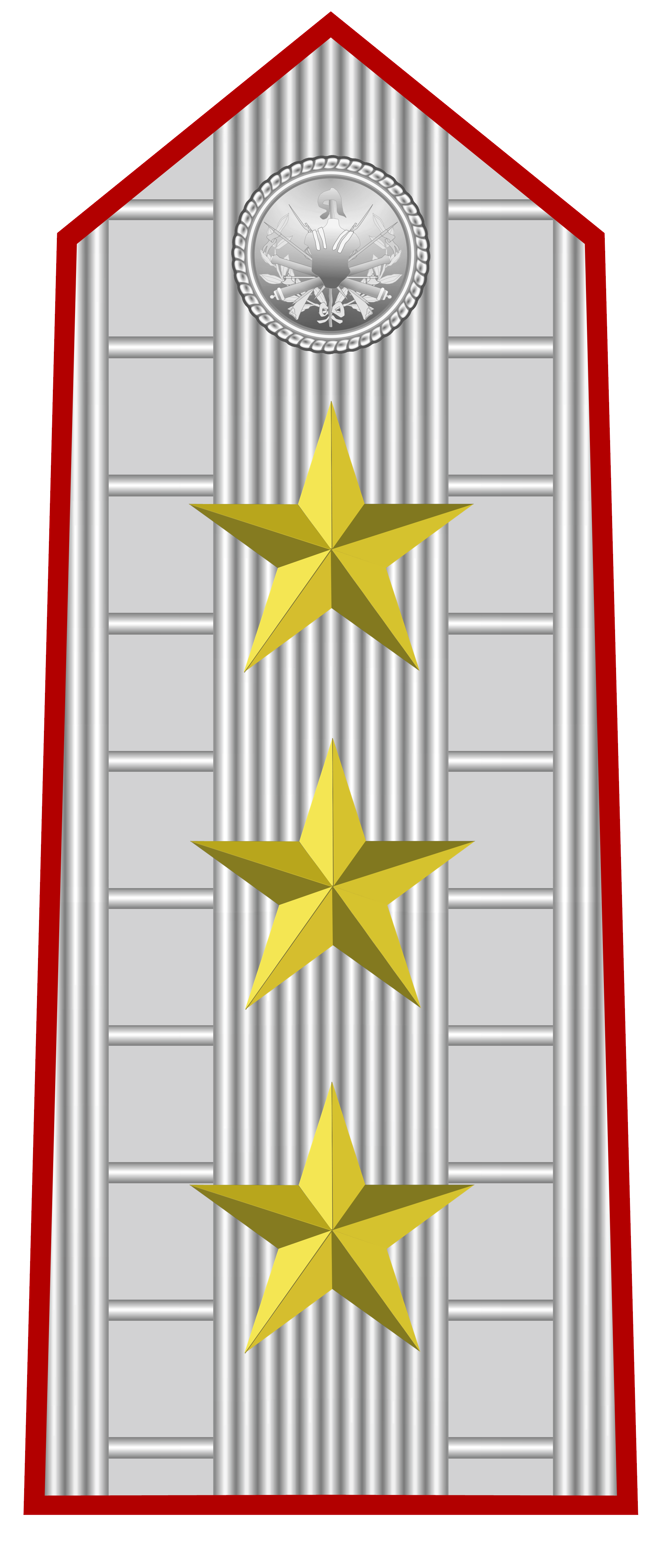
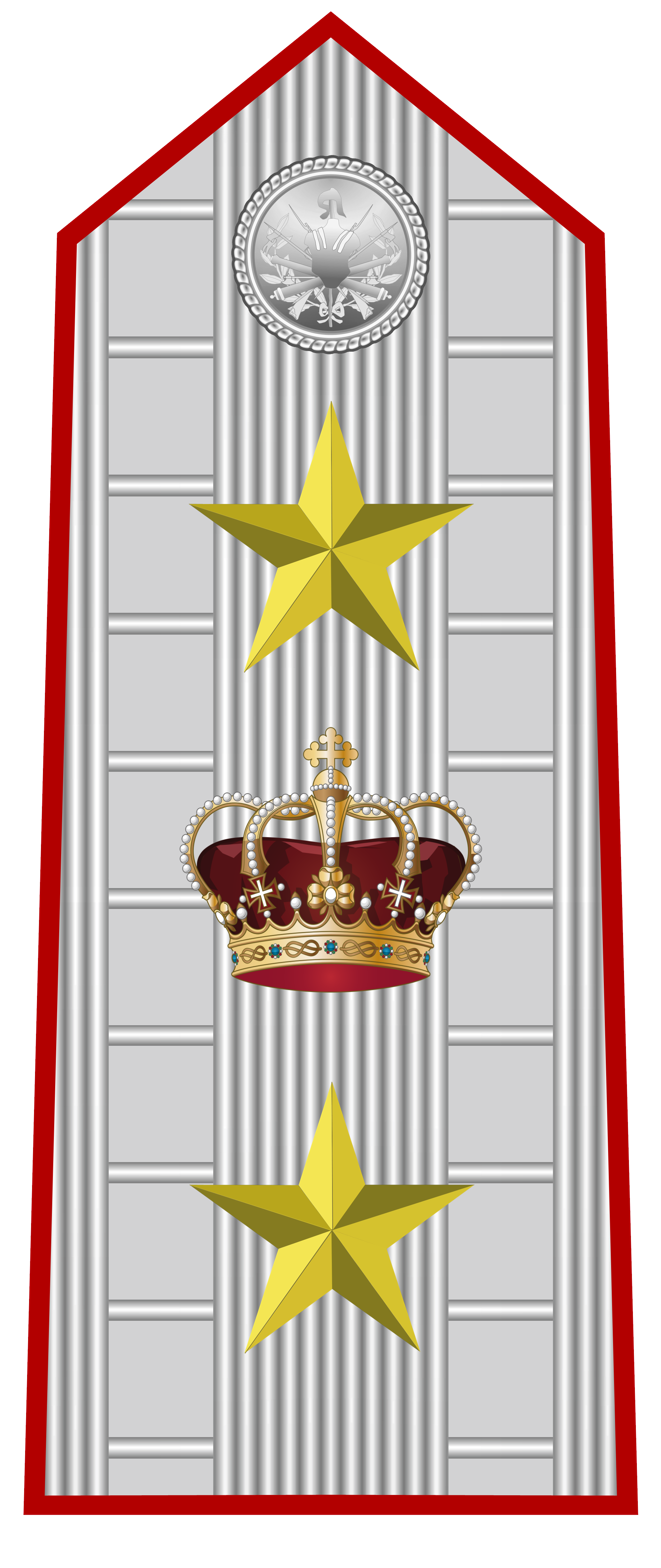
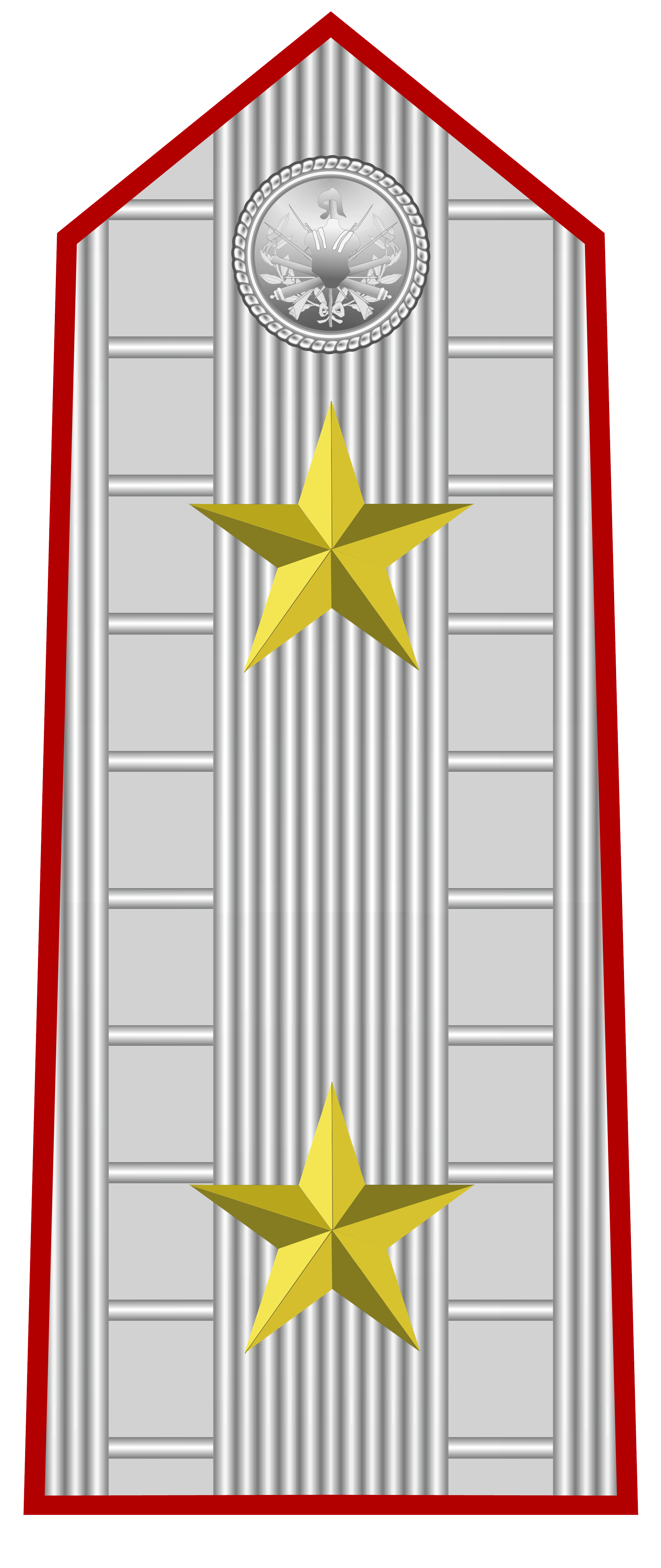
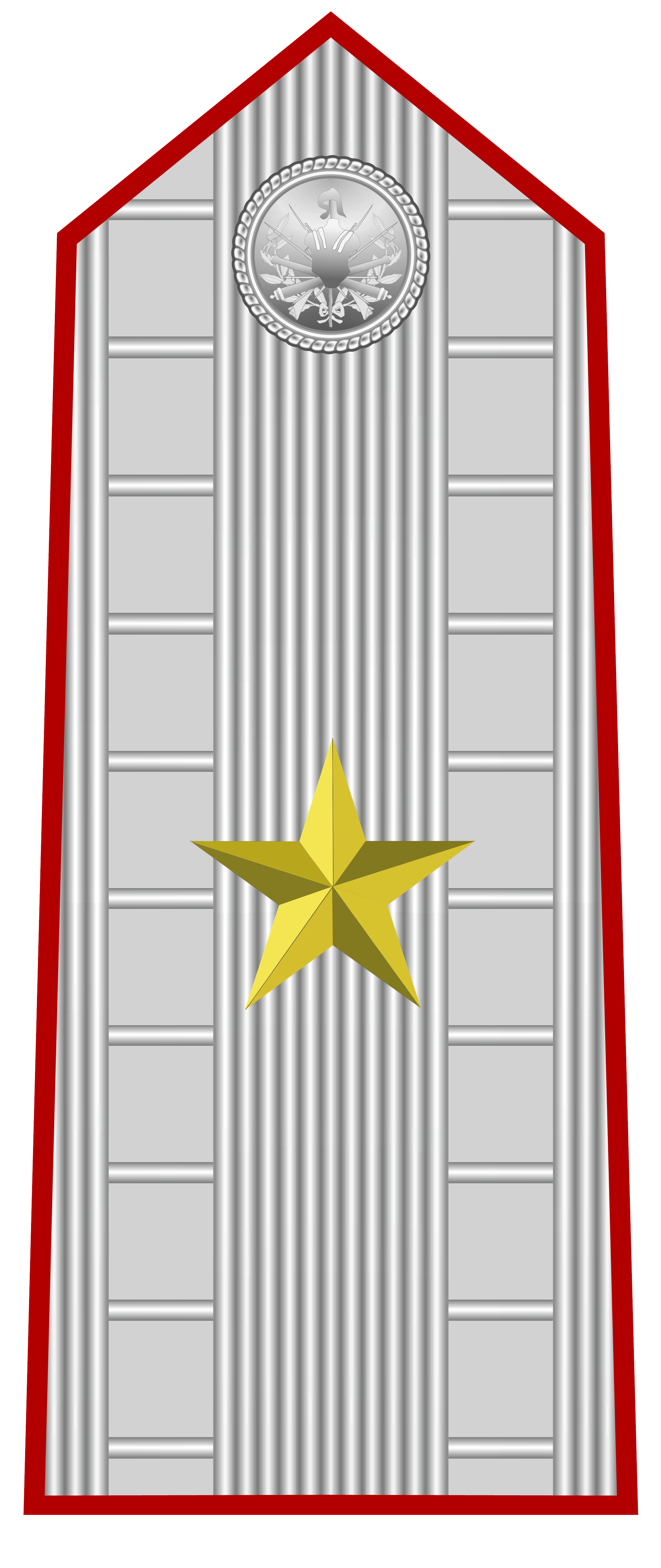
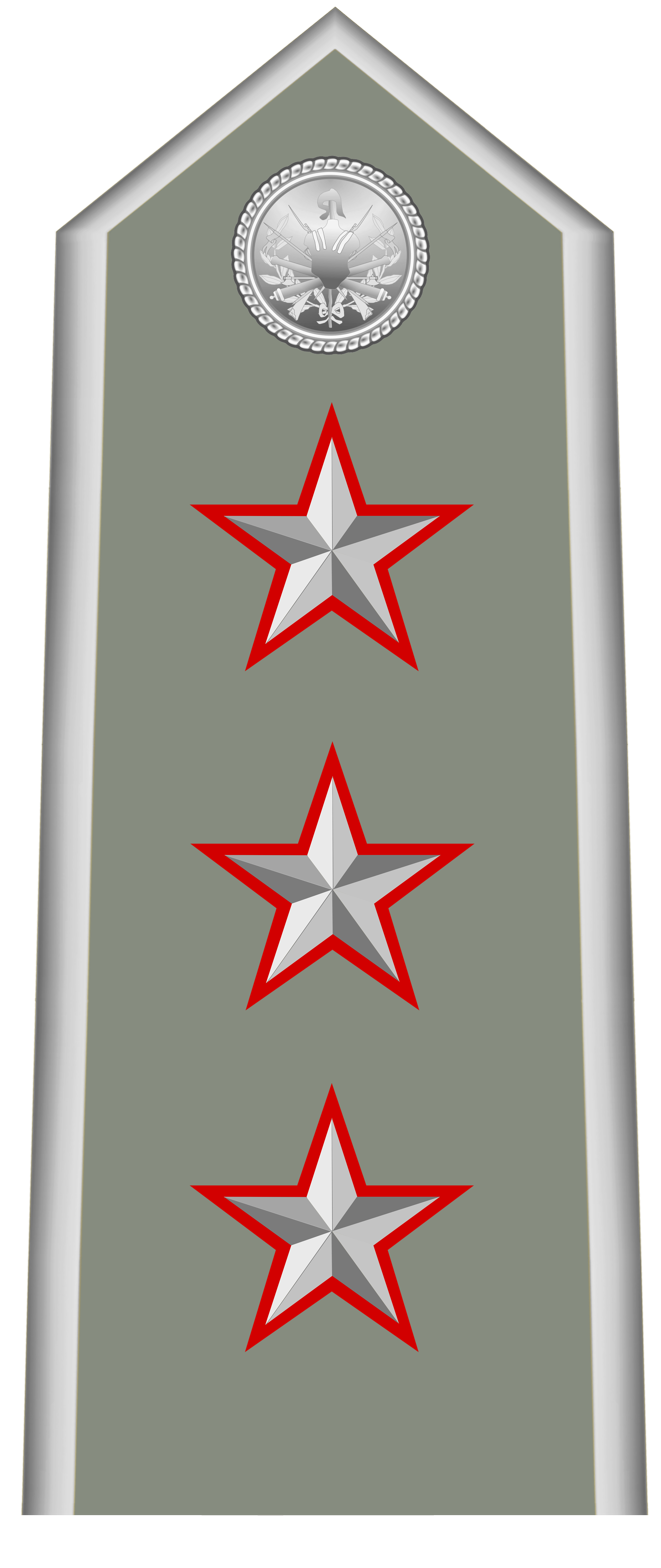
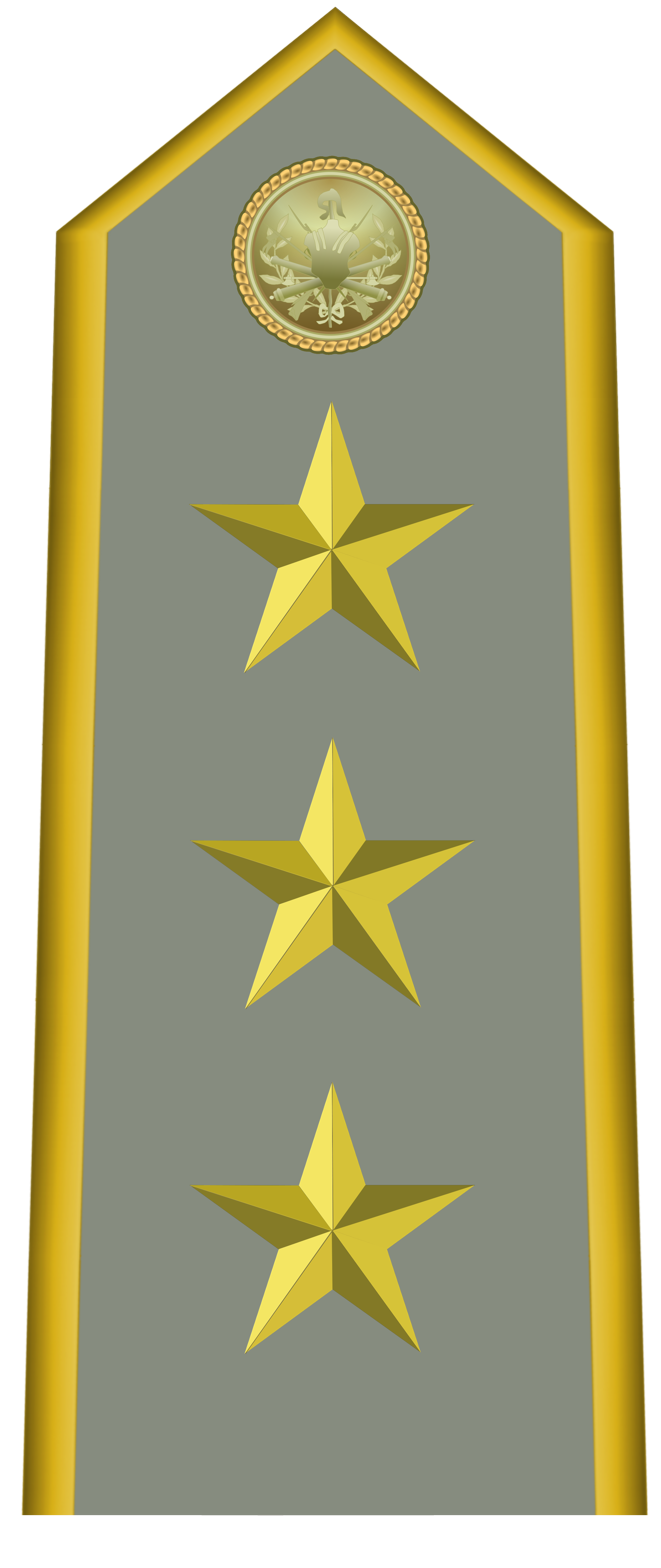
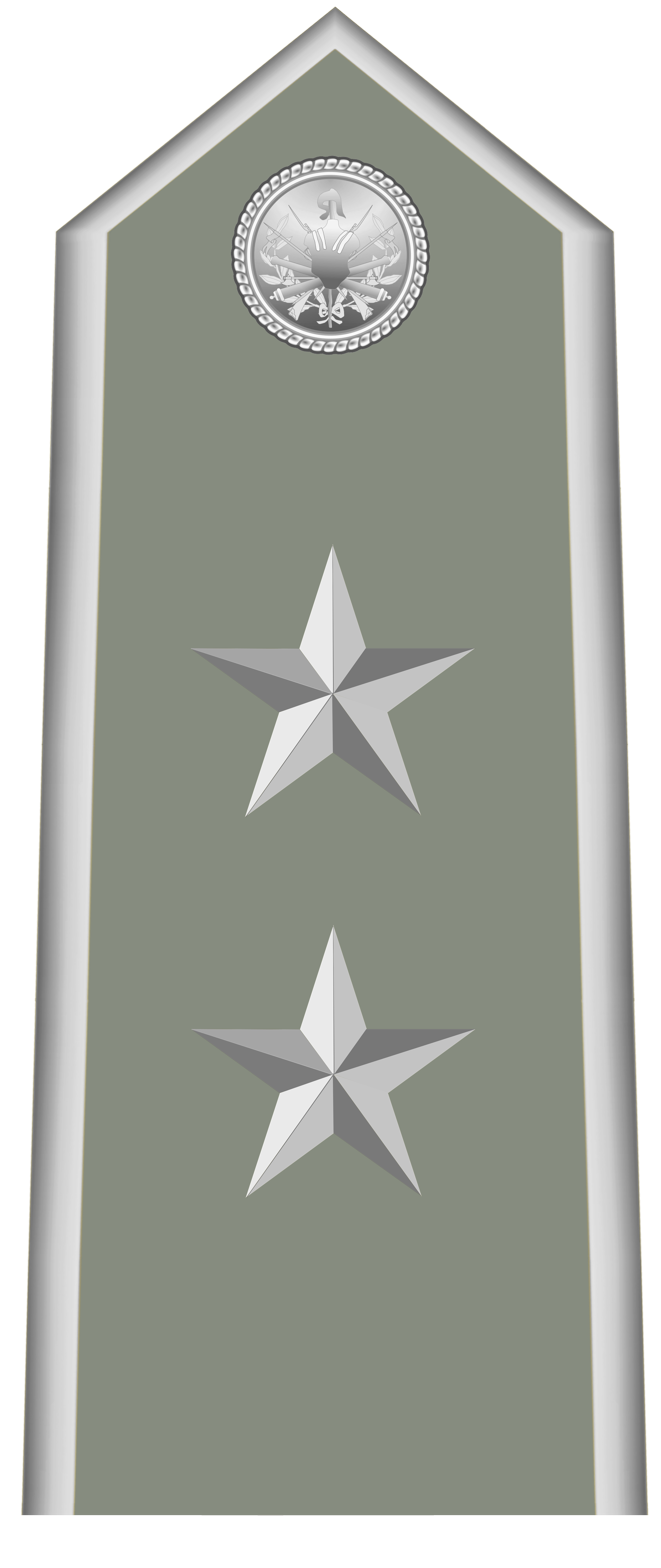
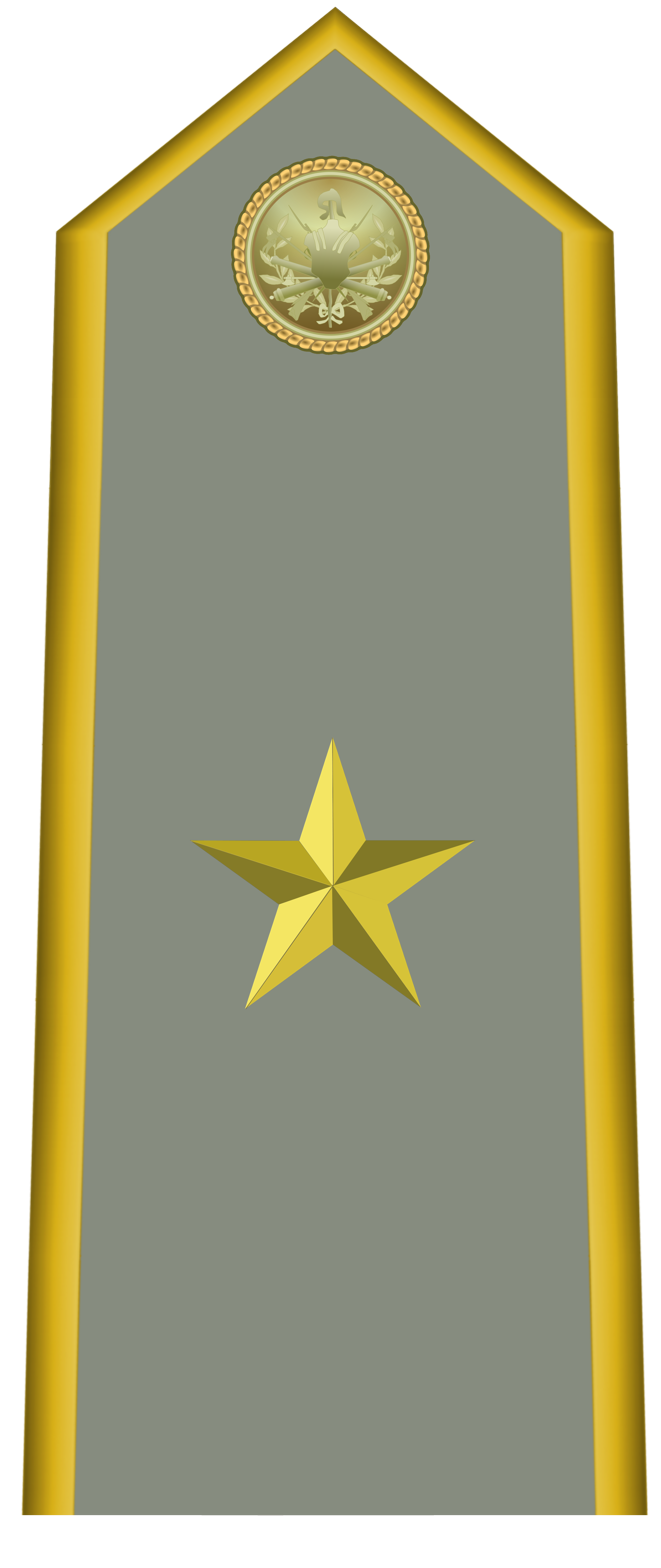
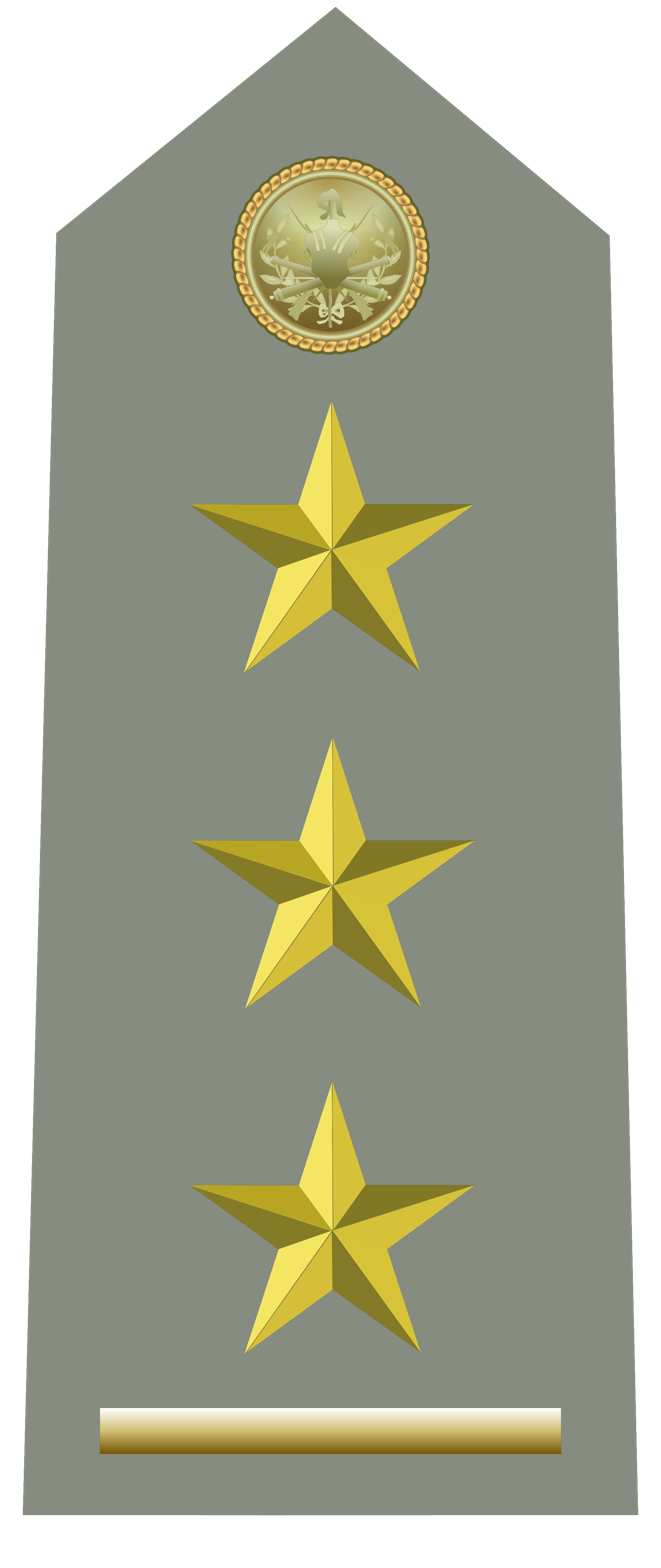
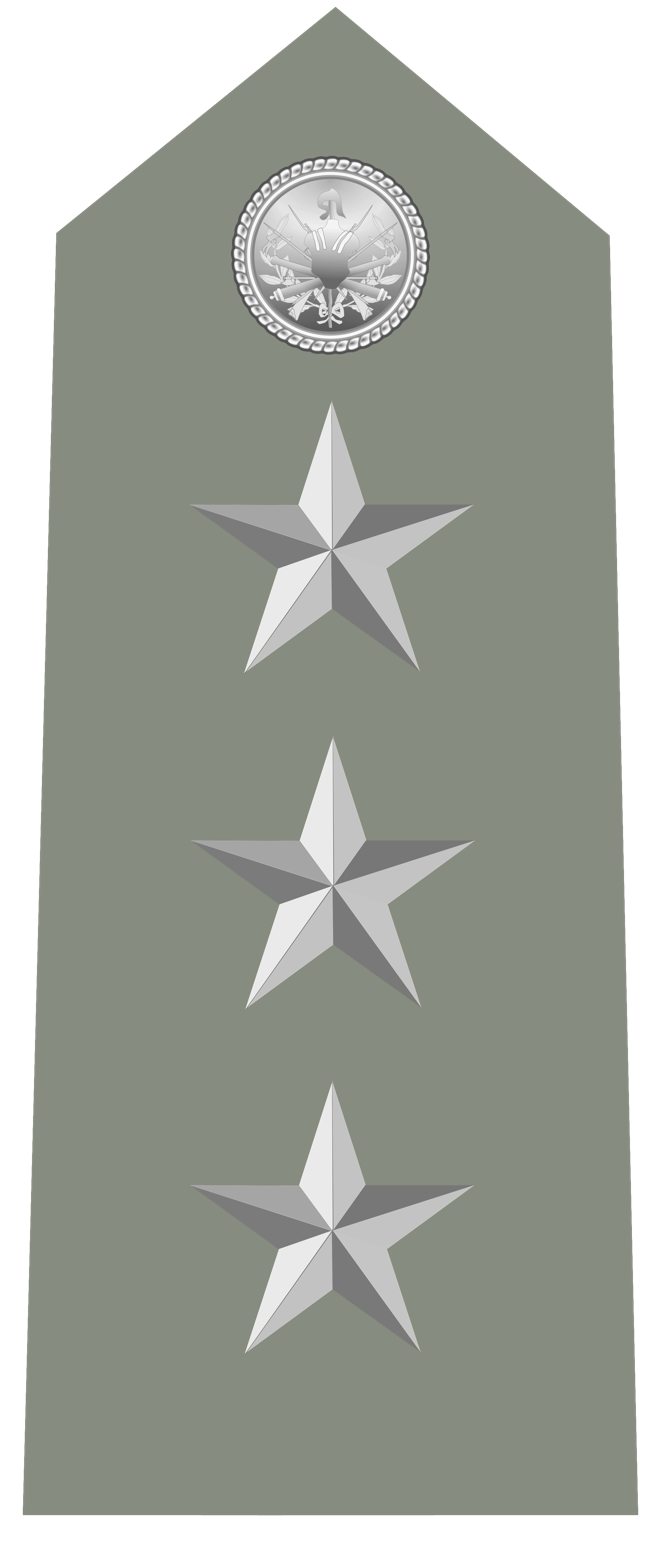
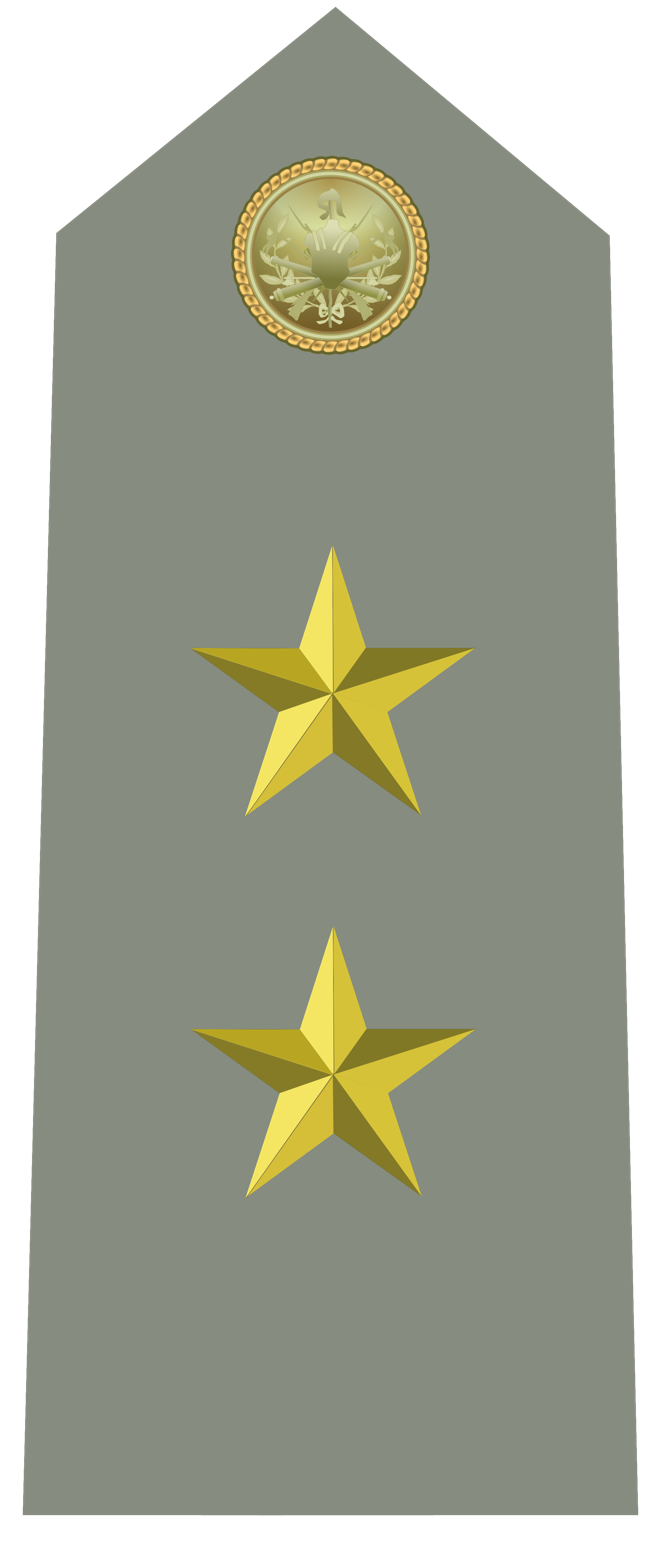
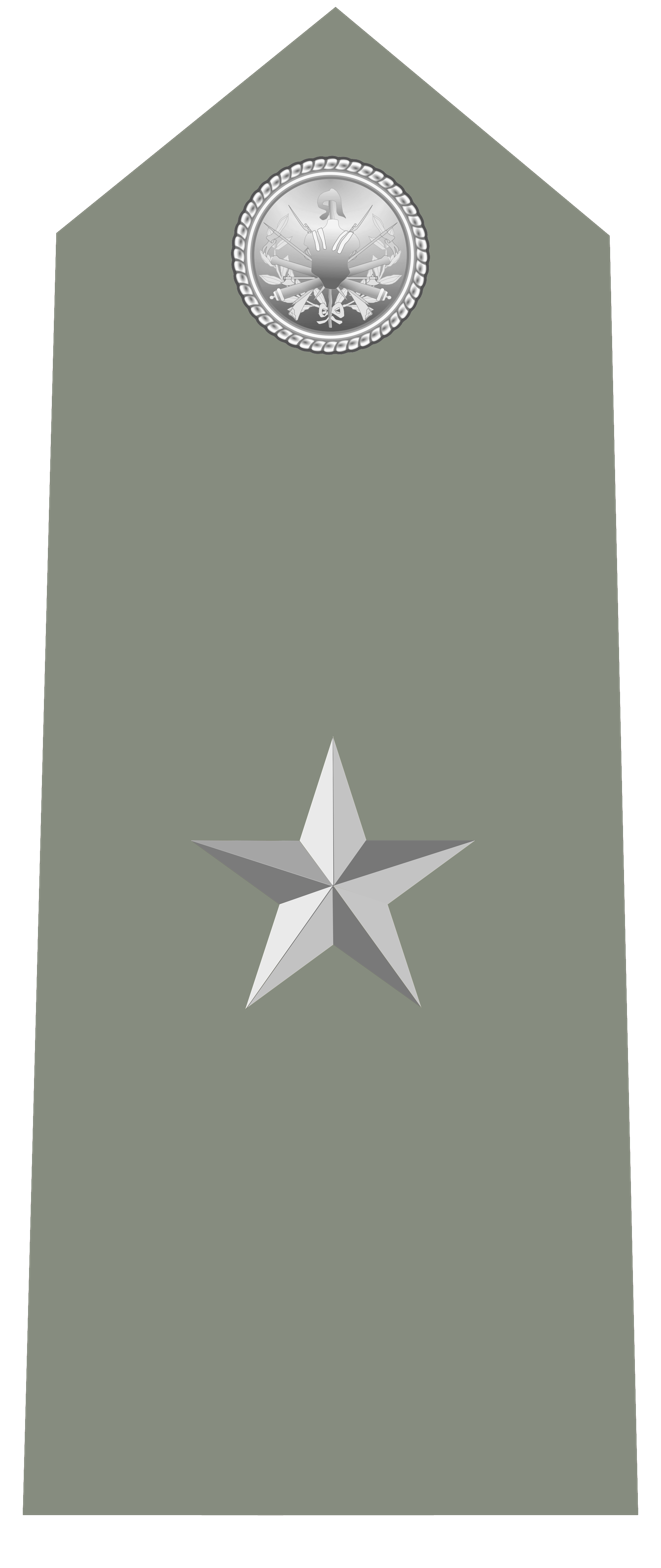
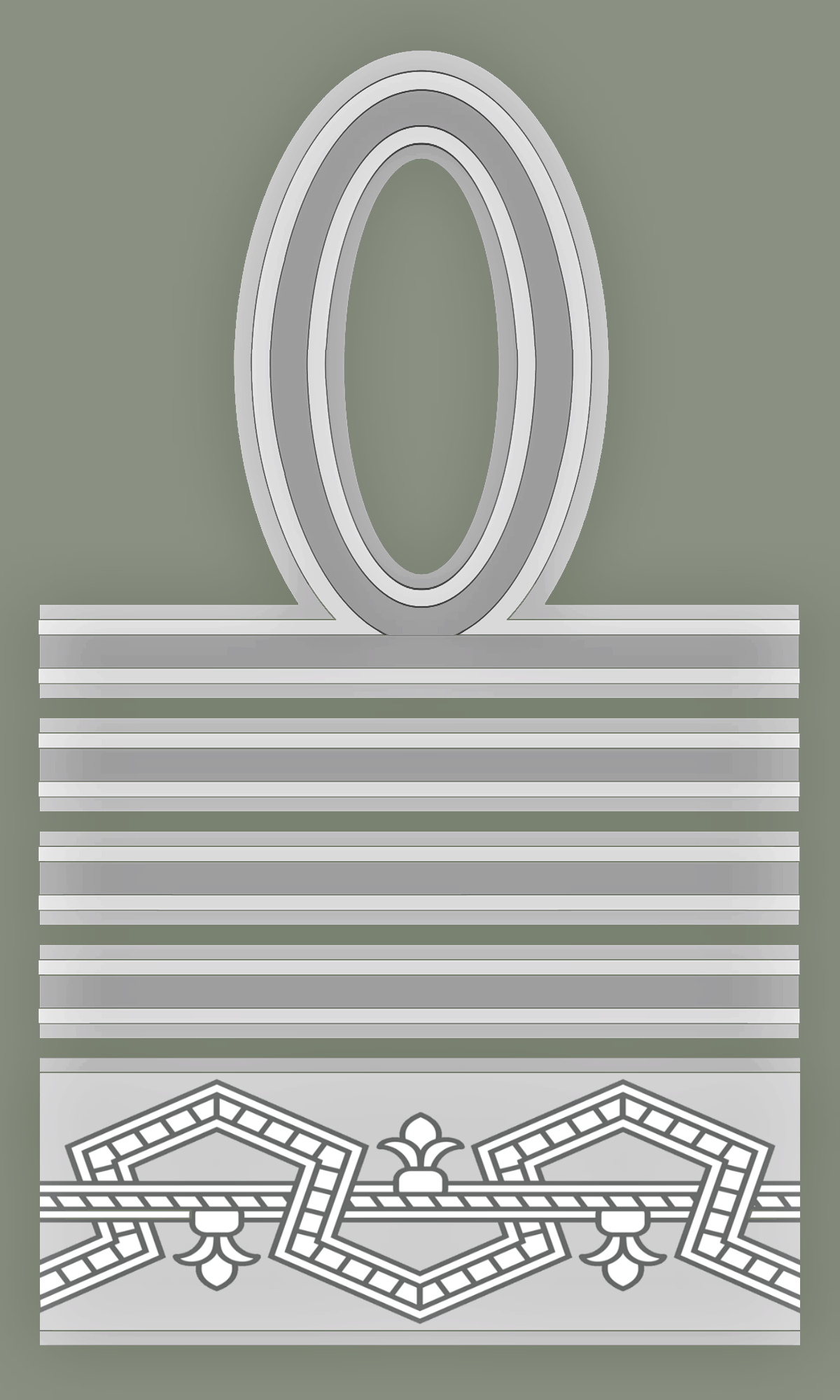
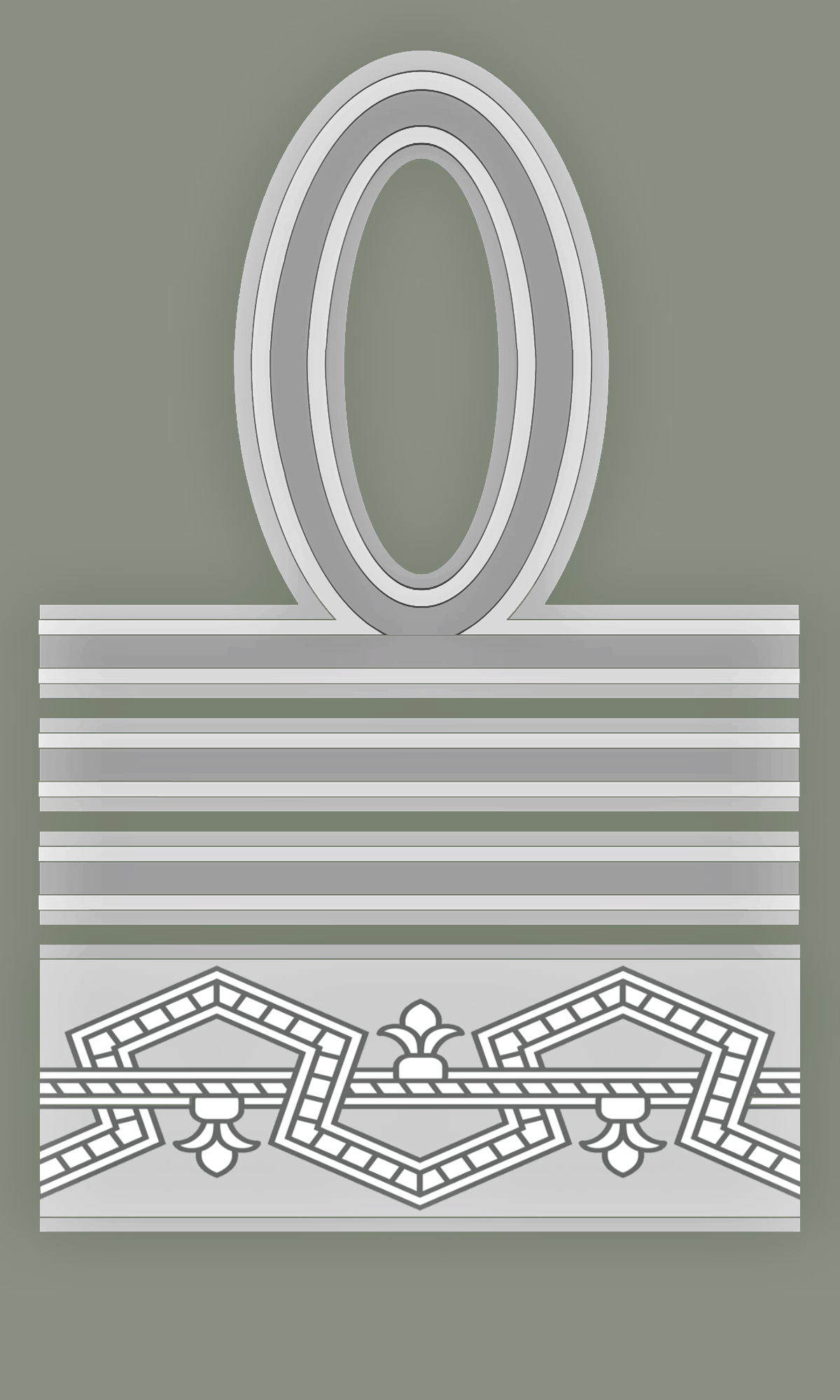
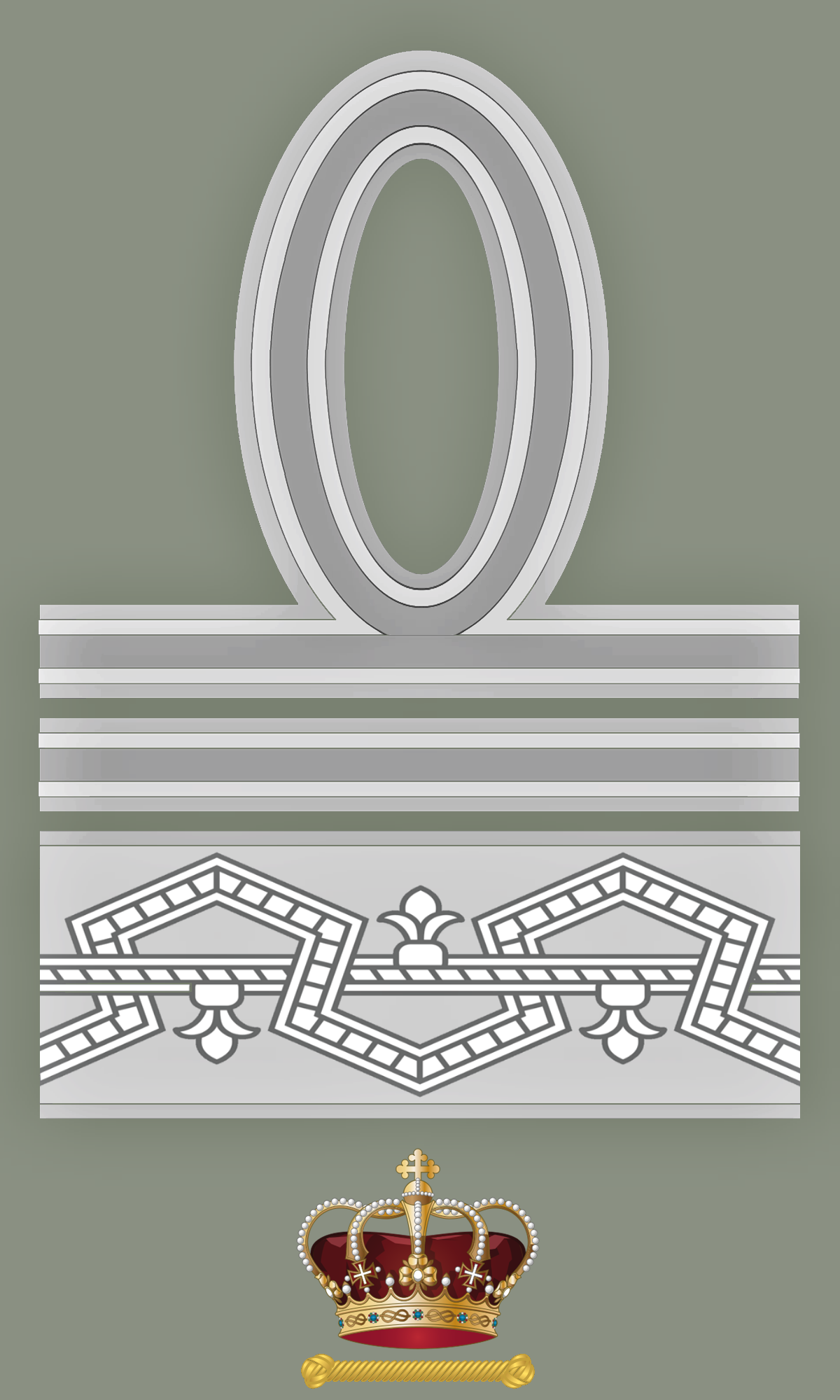
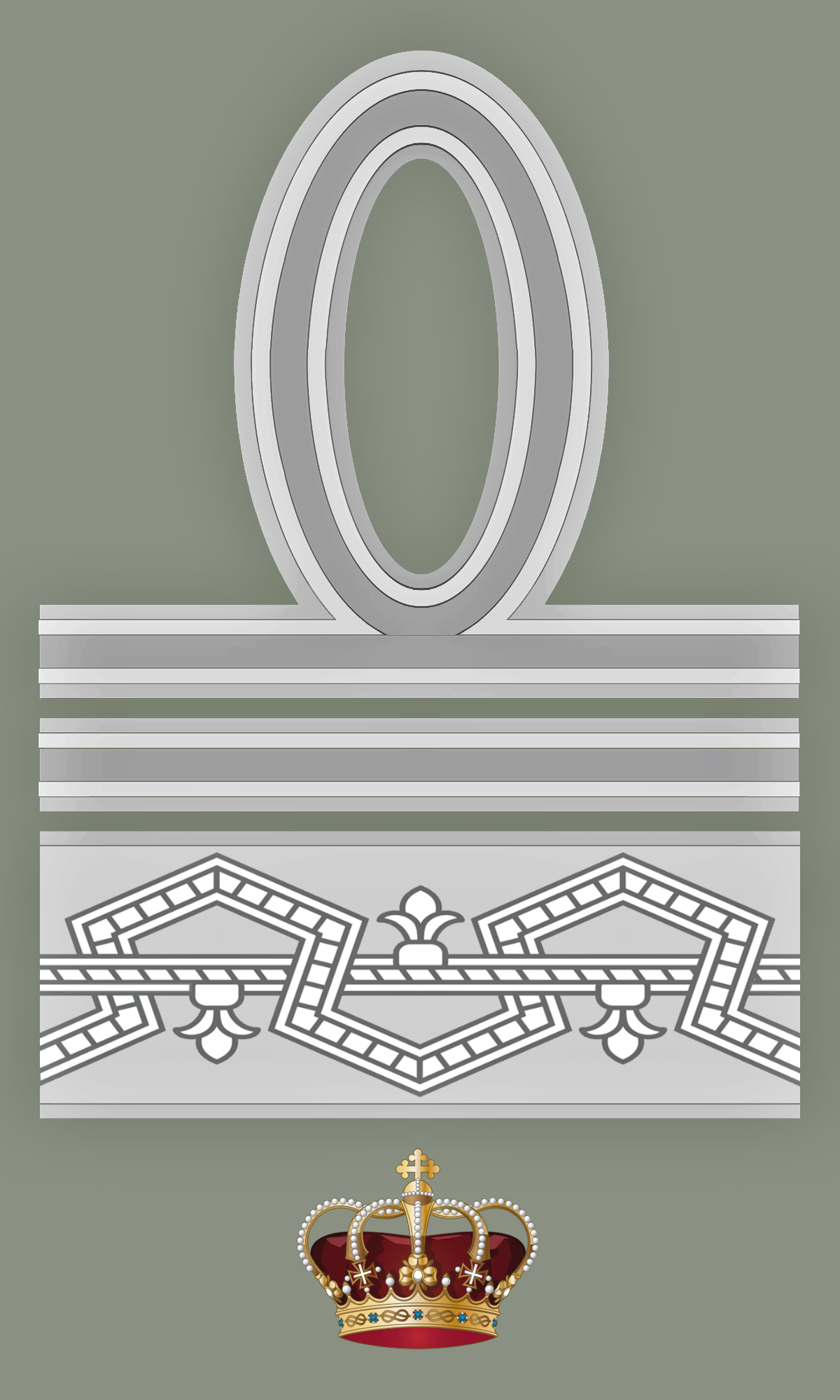
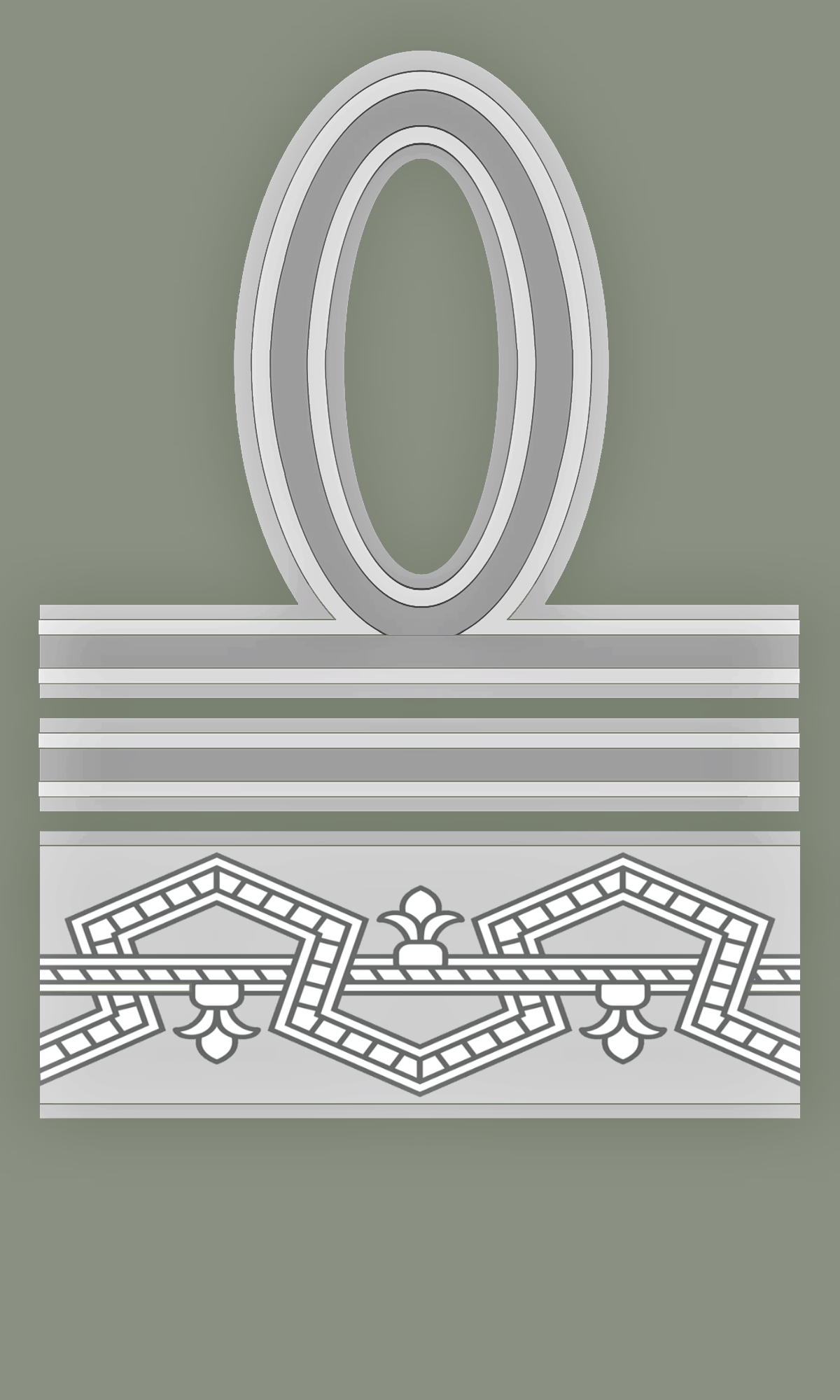
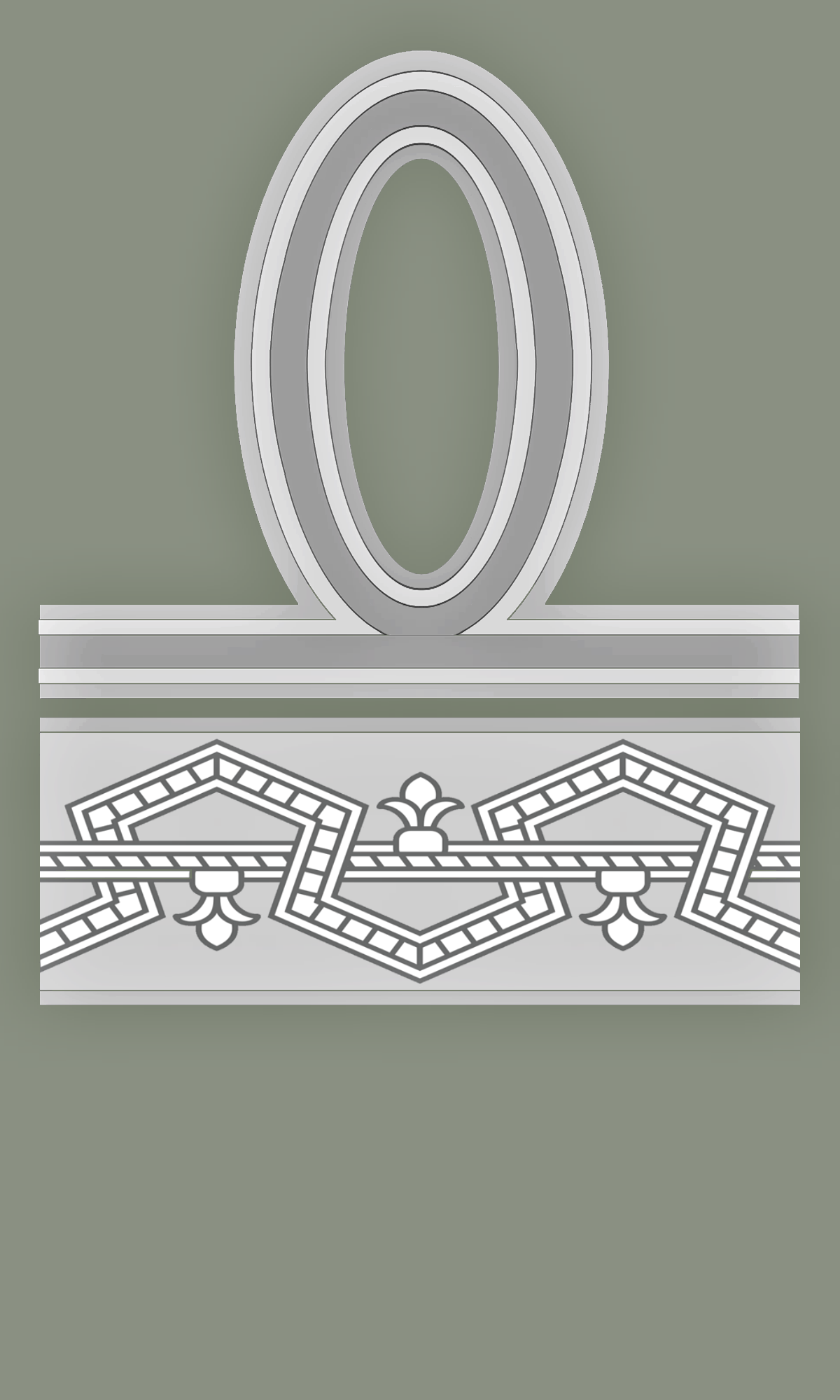
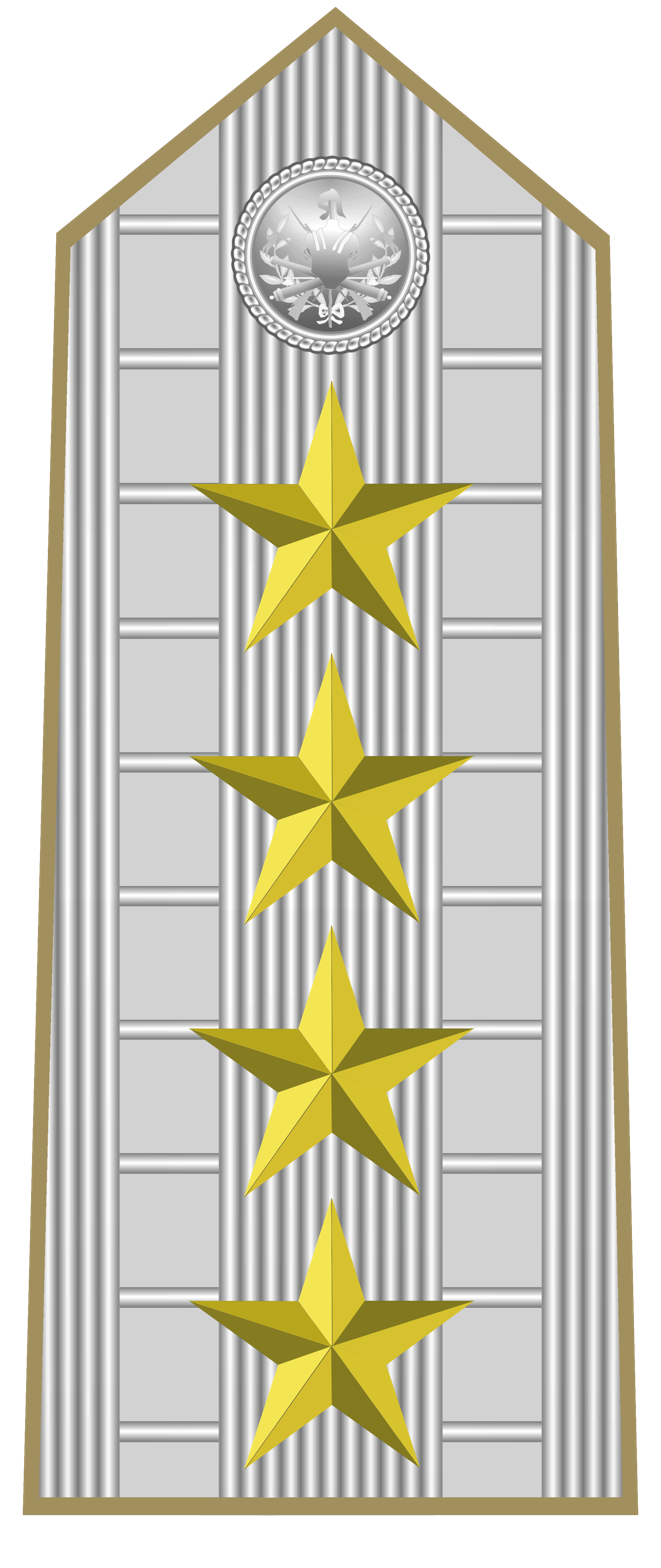
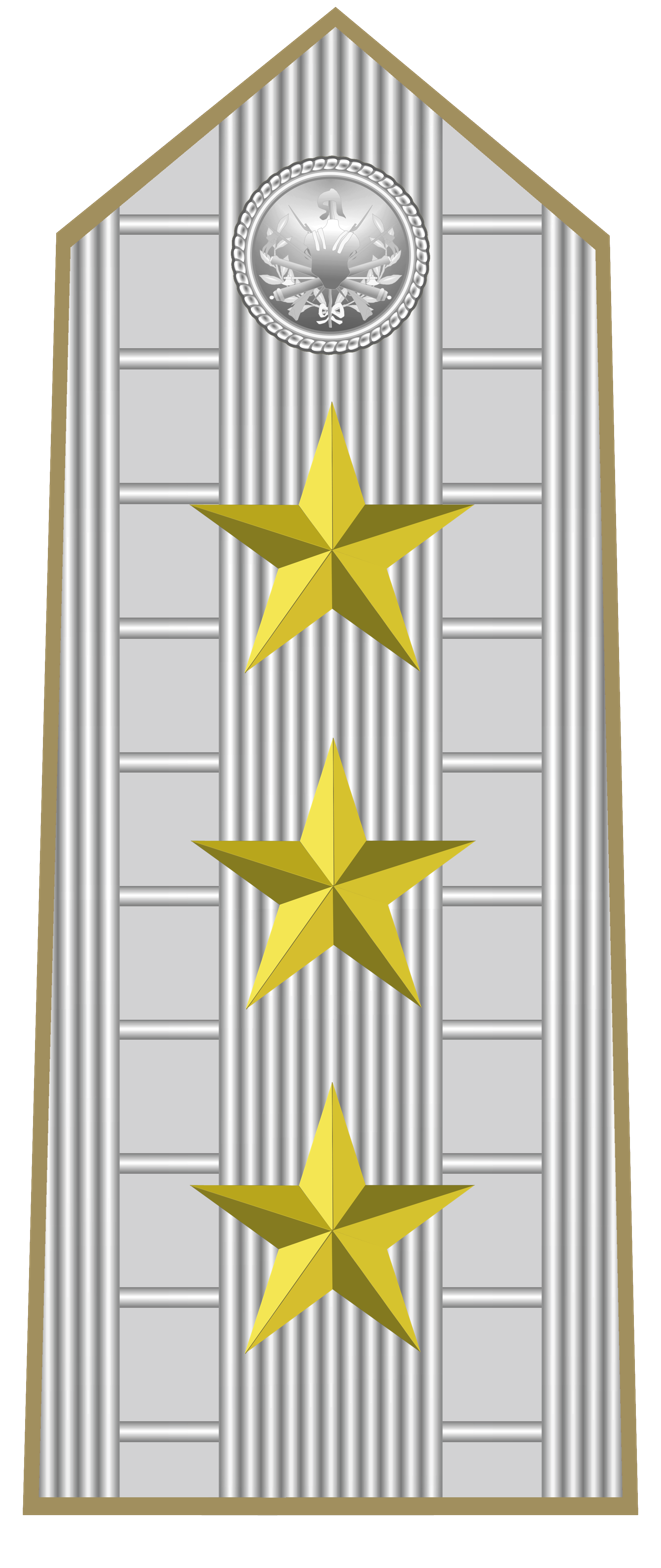
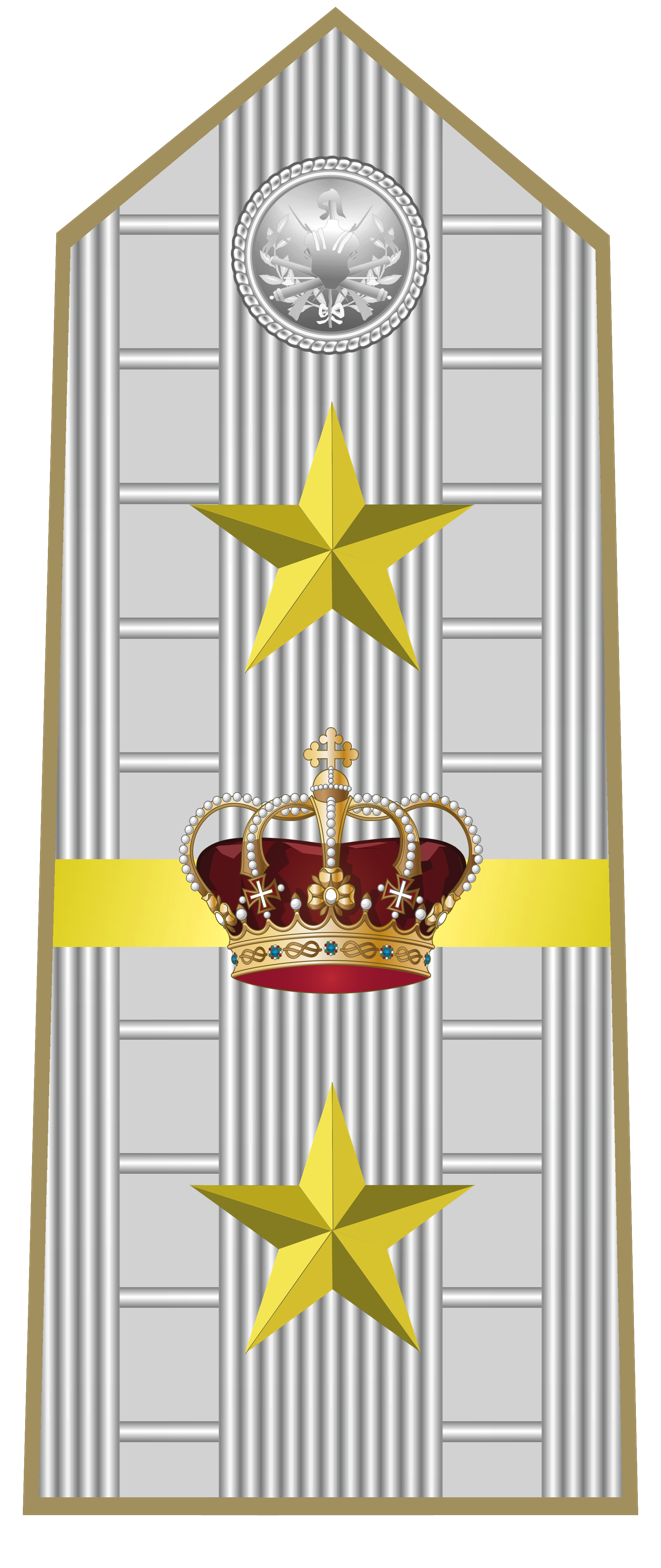
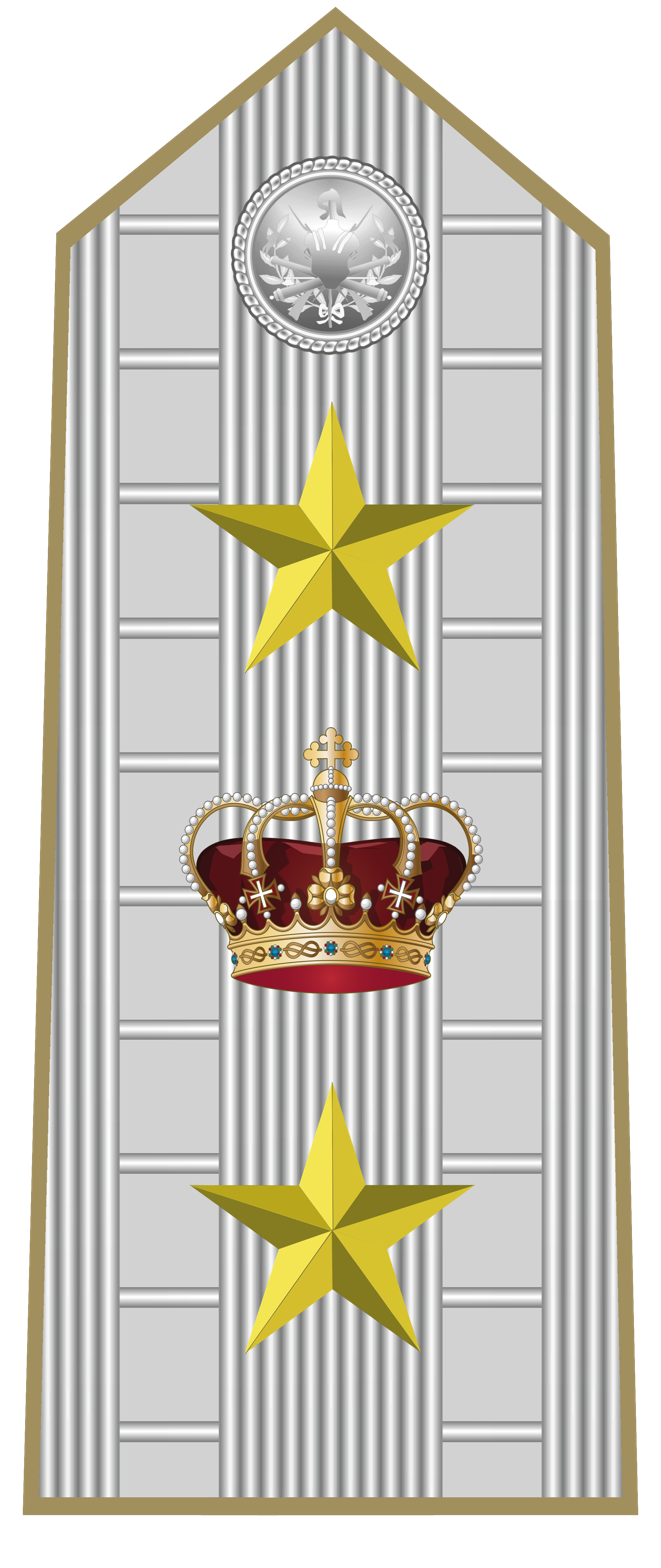
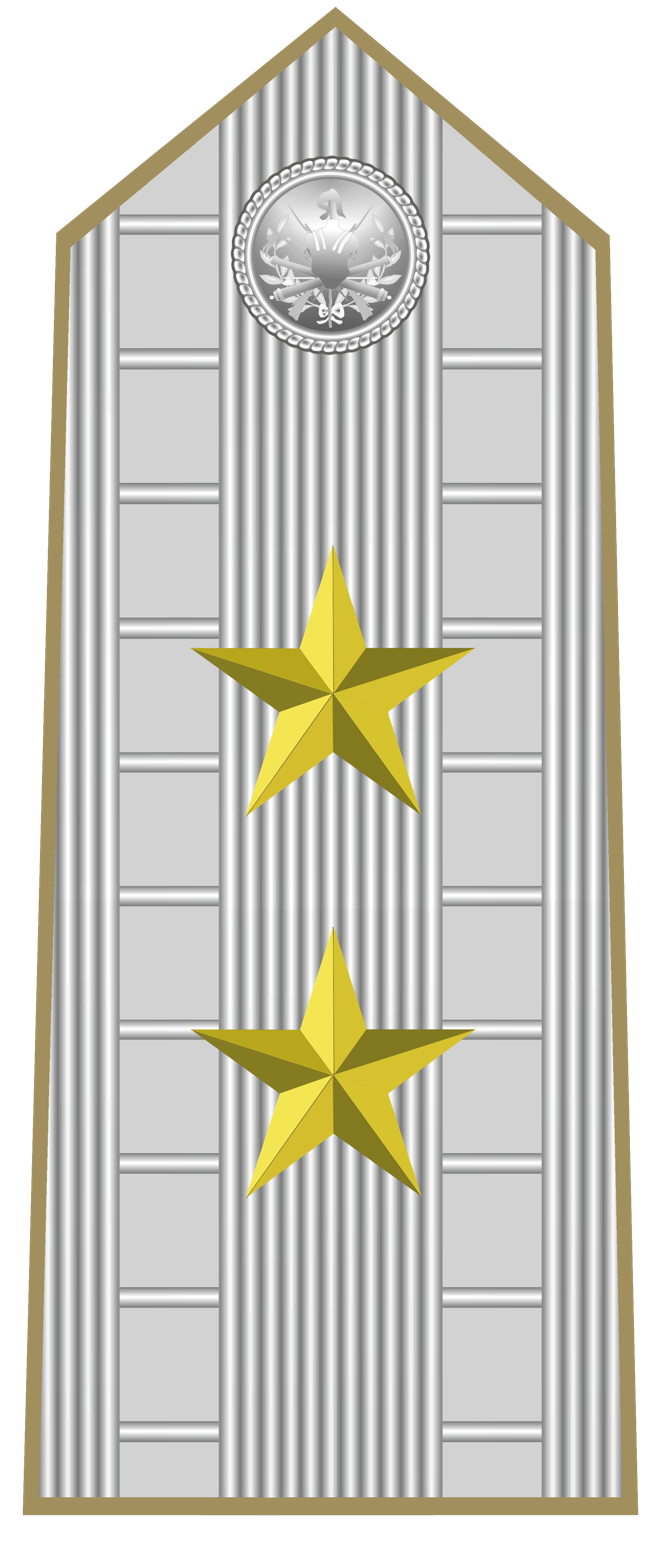
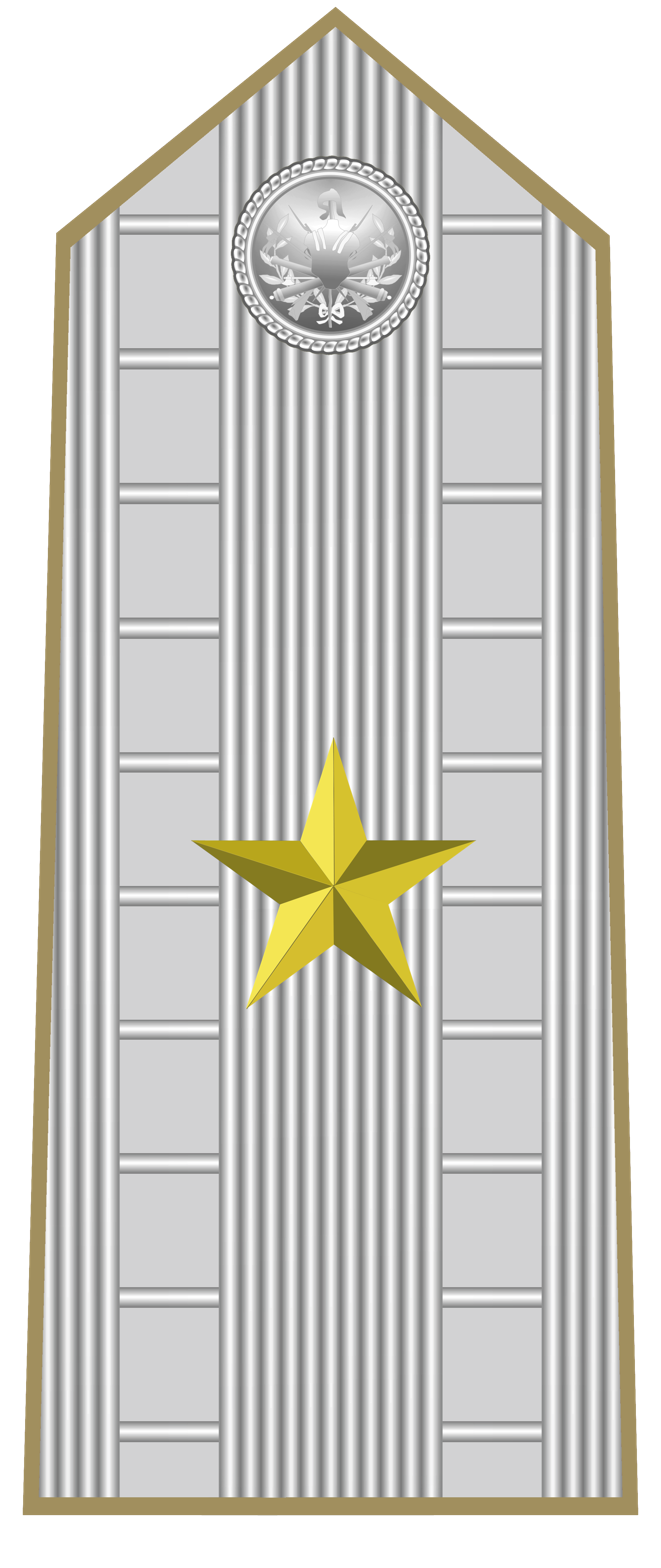
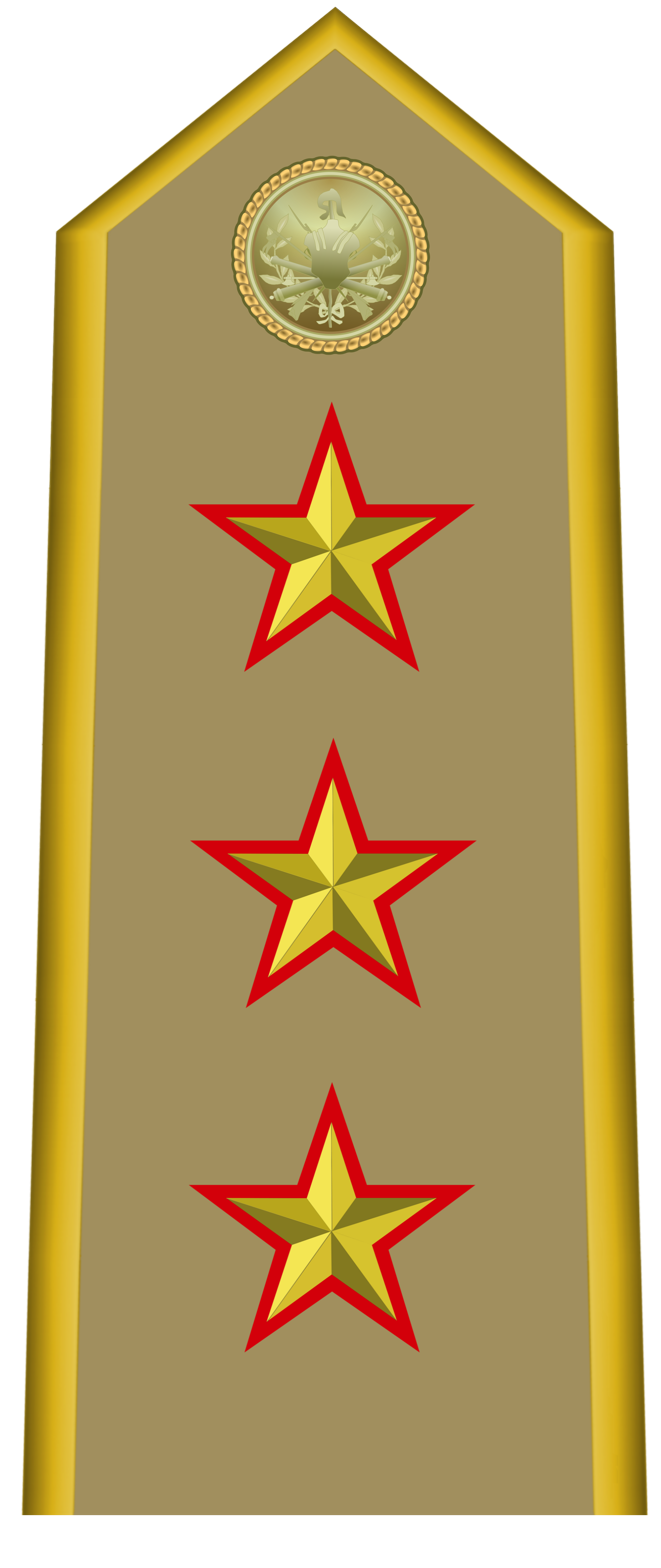
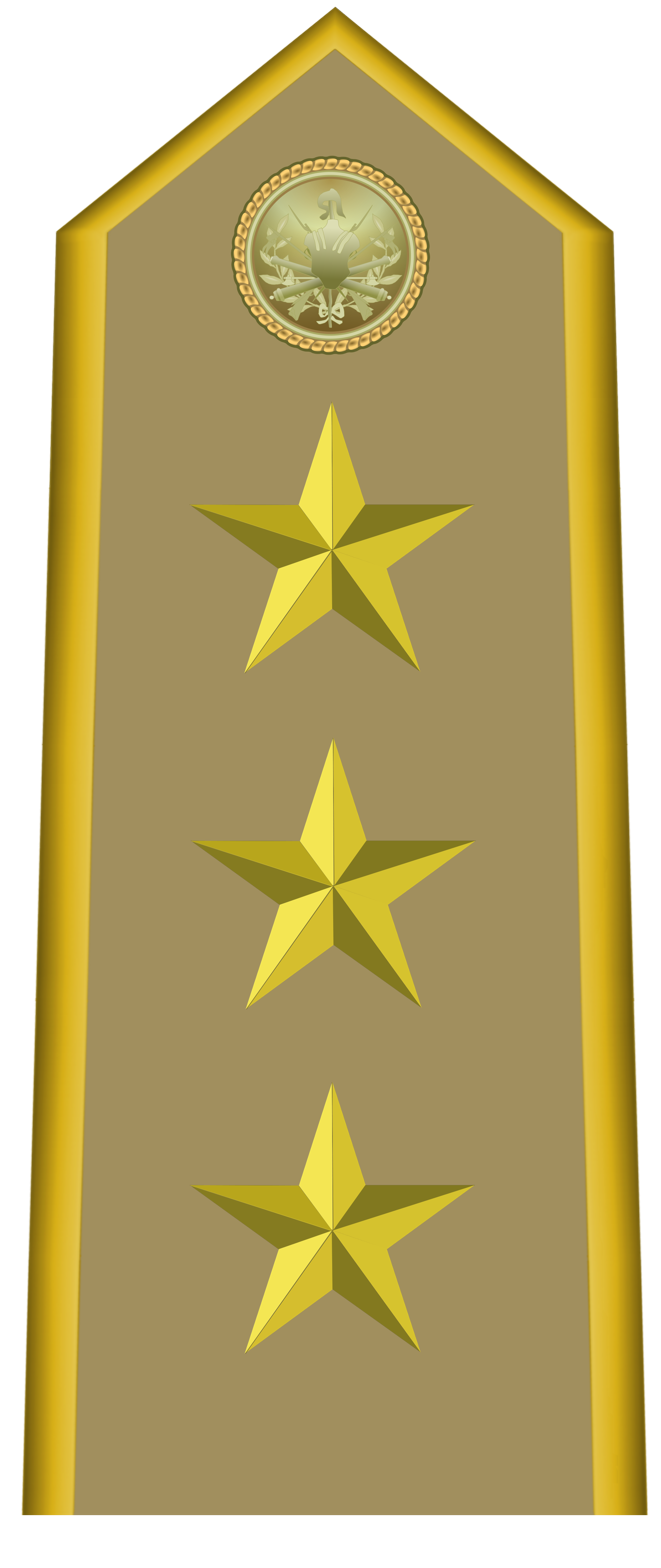
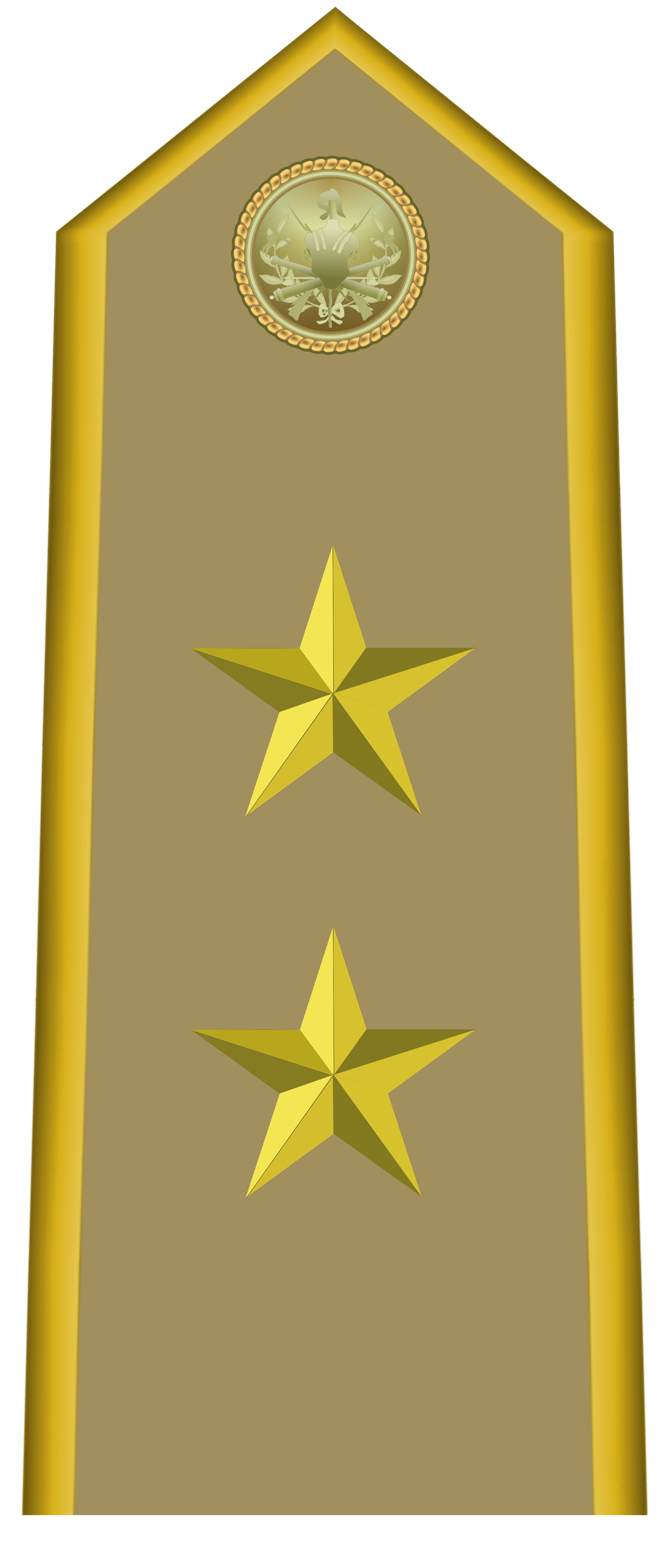
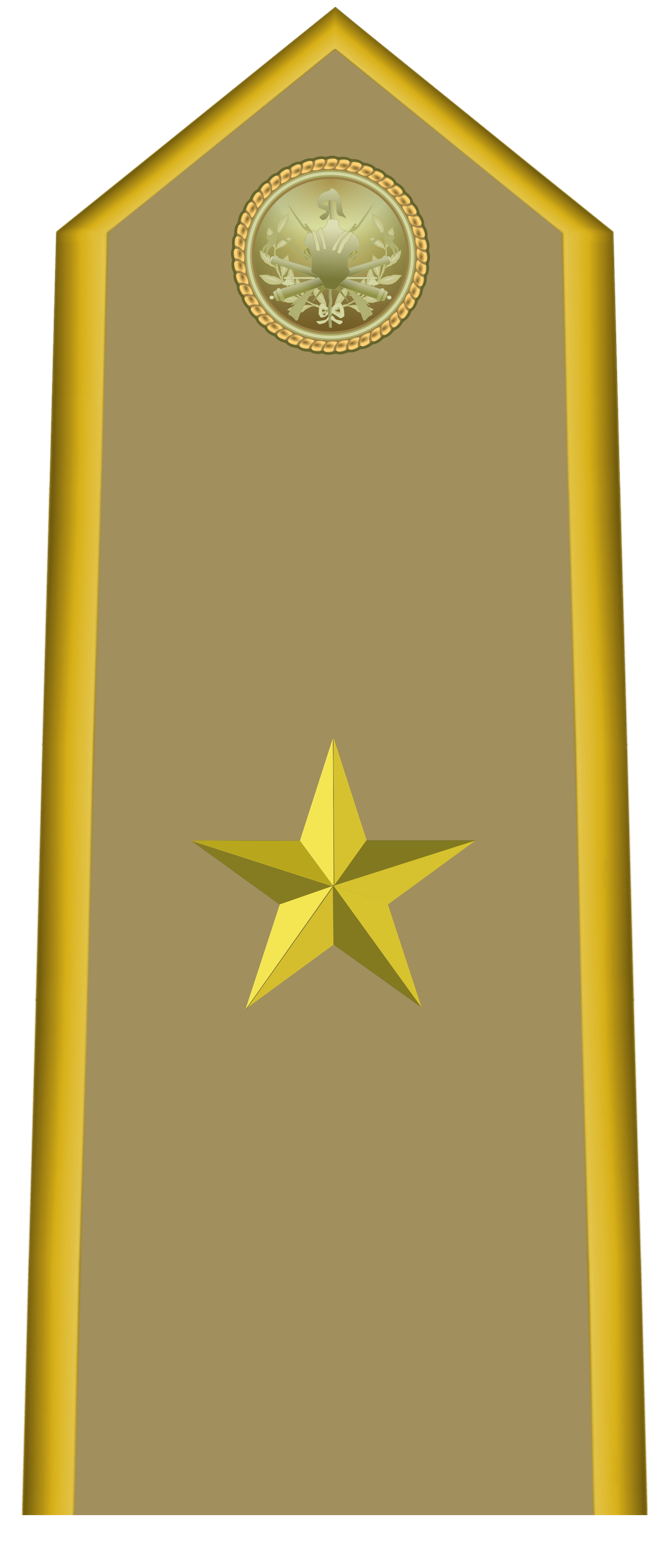
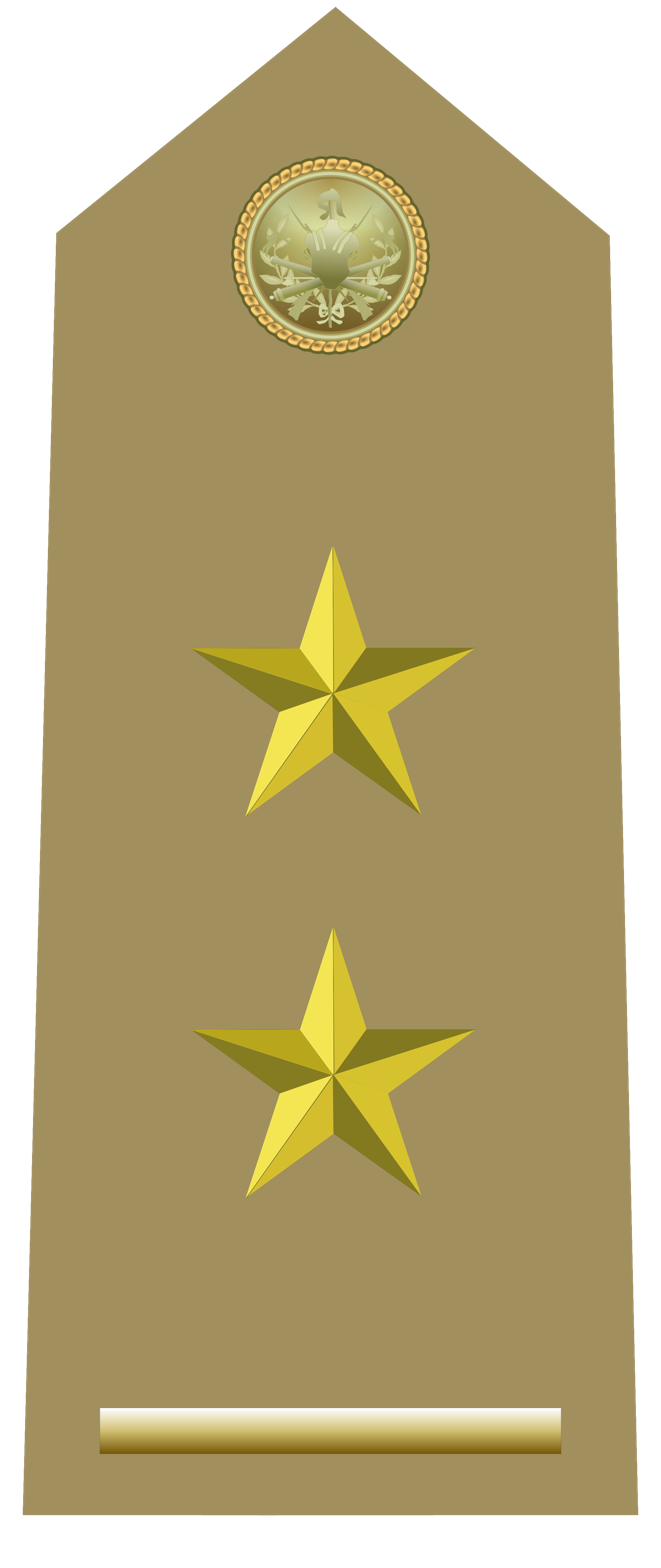
Rank group	General/flag officers									Field/senior officers					Junior officers
Royal Italian Army (1908–1915)
Royal Italian Army (1908–1915)		Generale d'Esercito			Generale in comando d'Armata	Tenente generale		Maggior generale		Colonnello comandante di reggimento	Colonnello	Tenente colonnello		Maggiore	Primo capitano	Capitano			Tenente	Sottotenente
Royal Italian Army (1915–1920)
Royal Italian Army (1915–1920)		Generale d'Esercito	Tenente generale capo di stato maggiore esercito	Tenente generale in comando d'Armata	Tenente generale in comando di corpo d'Armata	Tenente generale in comando di divisione	Maggior generale in comando di divisione	Maggior generale in comando di brigata	Brigadier generale	Colonello in comando di reggimento	Colonnello	Tenente colonnello di battaglione	Tenente colonnello	Maggiore	Primo capitano	Capitano in comando di battaglione	Capitano	Tenente in comando di compagnia	Tenente	Sottotenente
Royal Italian Army (1920–1926)
Royal Italian Army (1920–1926)	Maresciallo d'Italia	Generale d'Esercito		Generale in comando d'Armata	Generale in comando di corpo d'Armata	Generale in comando di divisione		Generale di brigata		Colonnello		Tenente colonnello		Maggiore		Capitano			Tenente	Sottotenente
(Kingdom of Italy) Royal Italian Army (1934–1945)
(Kingdom of Italy) Royal Italian Army (1934–1945)	Maresciallo d'Italia	Generale d'Armata		Generale designato d'Armata	Generale di corpo d'Armata	Generale di divisione		Generale di brigata		Colonnello comandante	Colonnello	Tenente colonnello		Maggiore	Primo capitano	Capitano		Primo tenente	Tenente	Sottotenente
Royal Italian Army (1945–1947)
Royal Italian Army (1945–1947)	Maresciallo d'Italia	Generale d'armata		Generale designato d'armata	Generale di corpo d'armata	Generale di divisione		Generale di brigata		Colonnello comandante di reggimento	Colonnello	Tenente colonnello		Maggiore	Primo capitano	Capitano		Primo tenente	Tenente	Sottotenente
Rank group	General/flag officers									Field/senior officers					Junior officers

=== Other ranks ===
The rank insignia of non-commissioned officers and enlisted personnel.

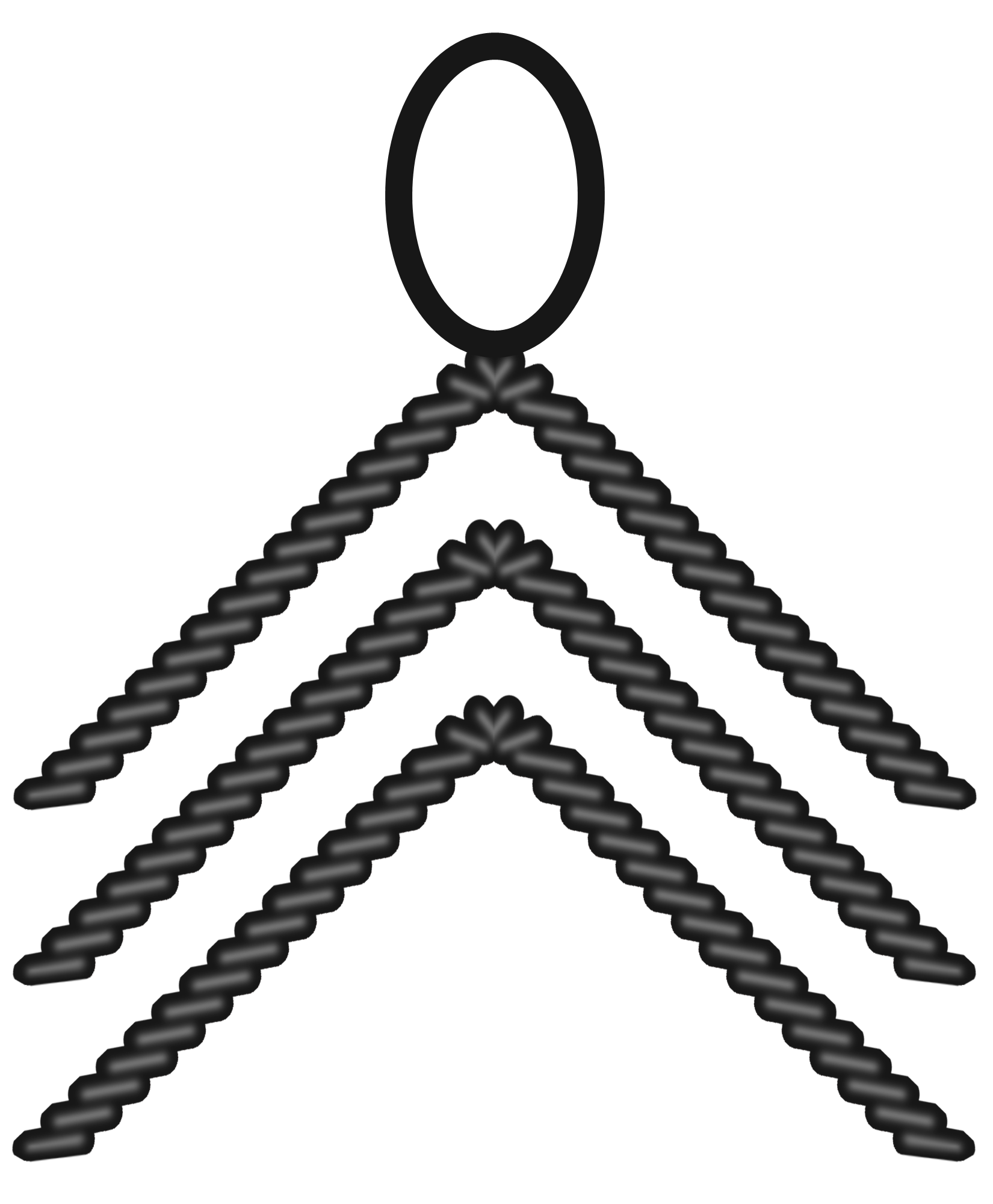
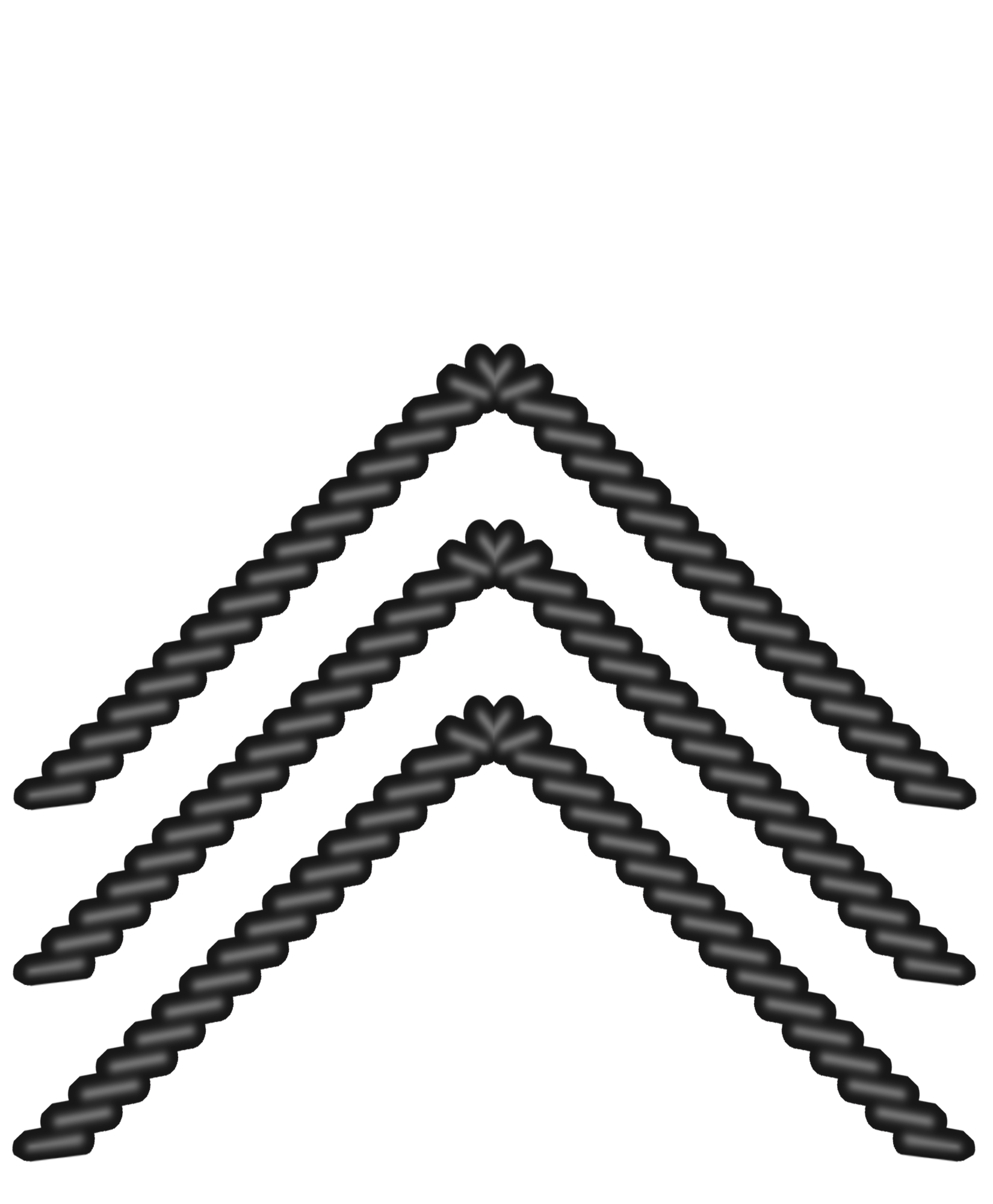
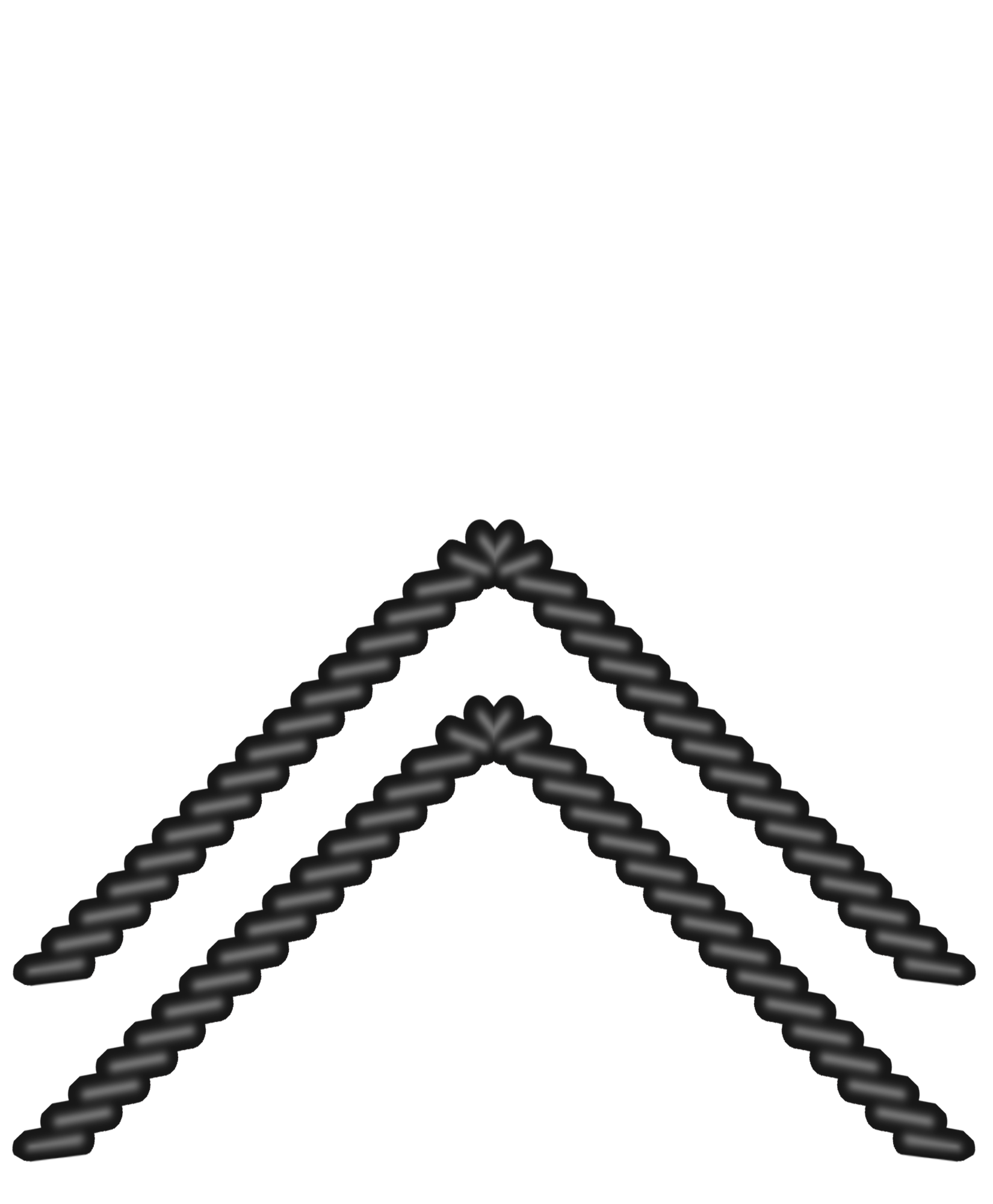
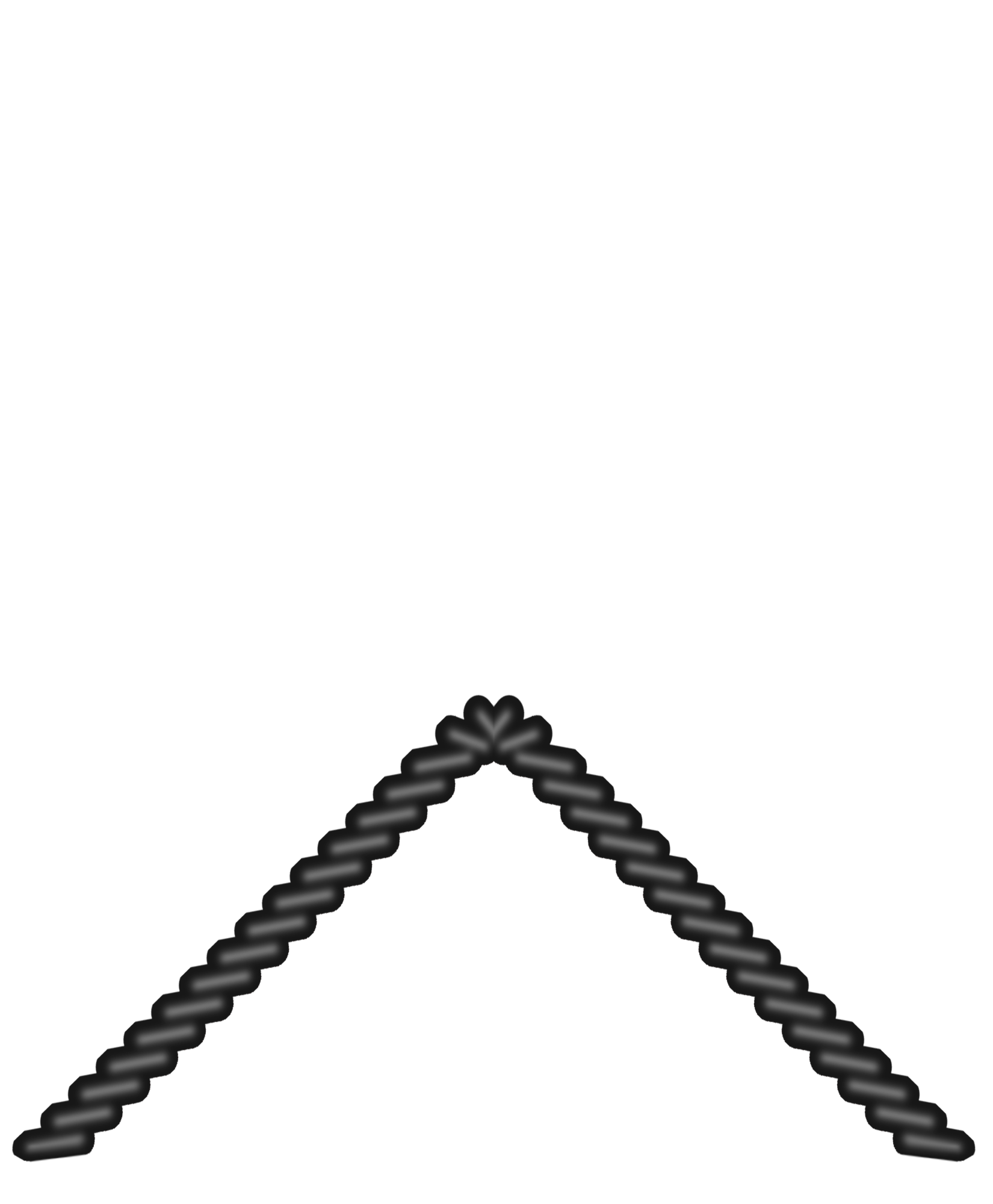
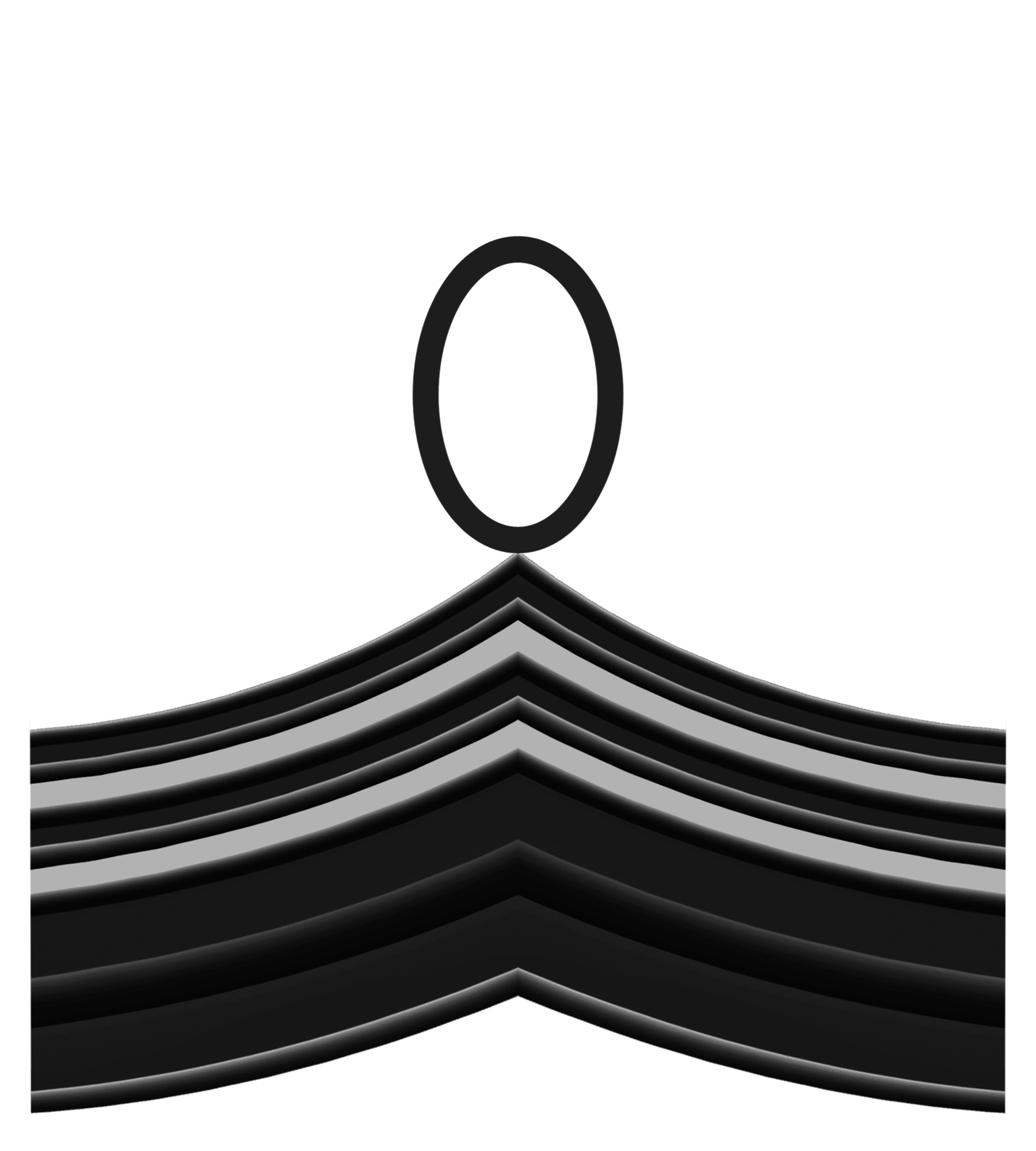
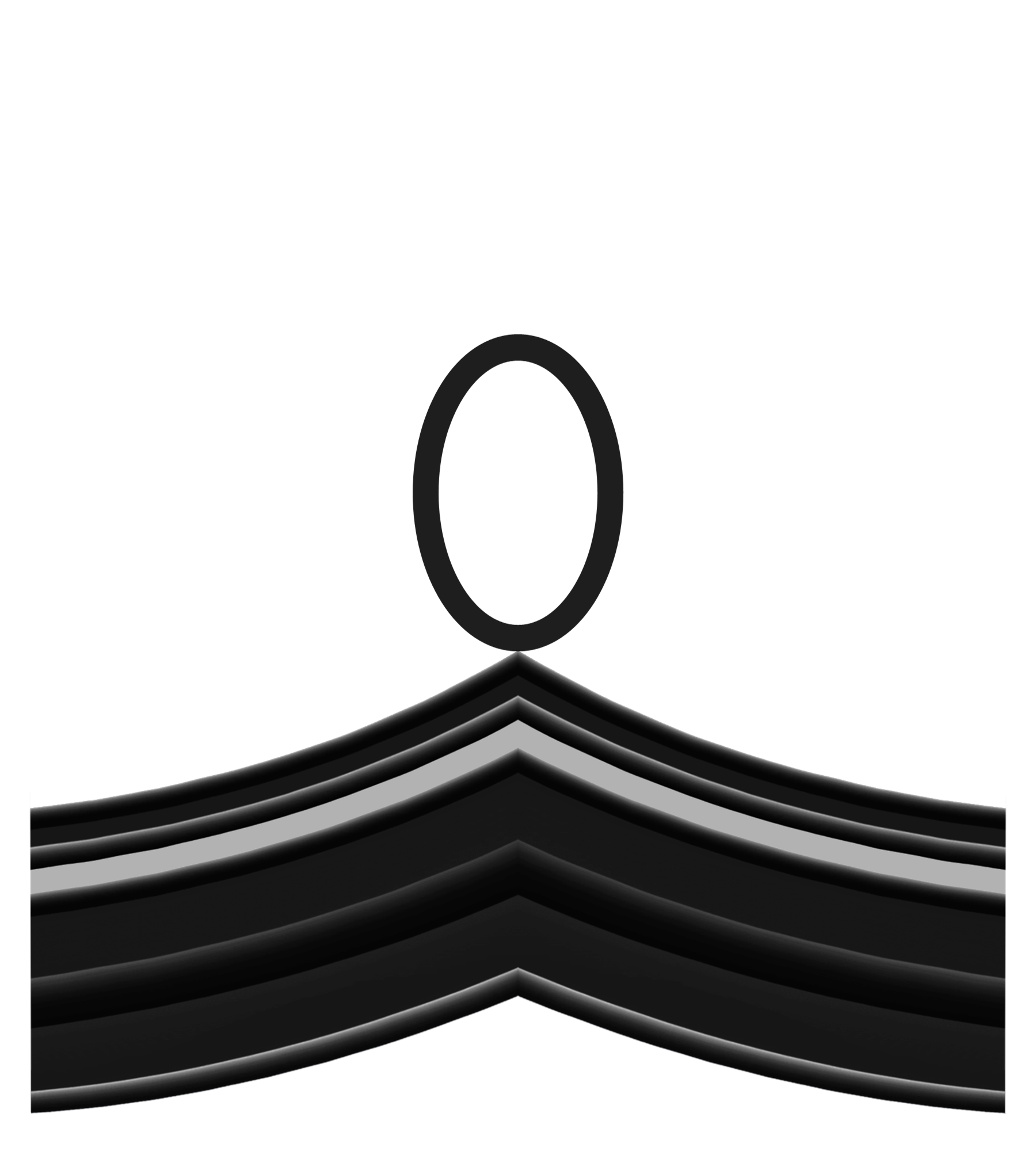
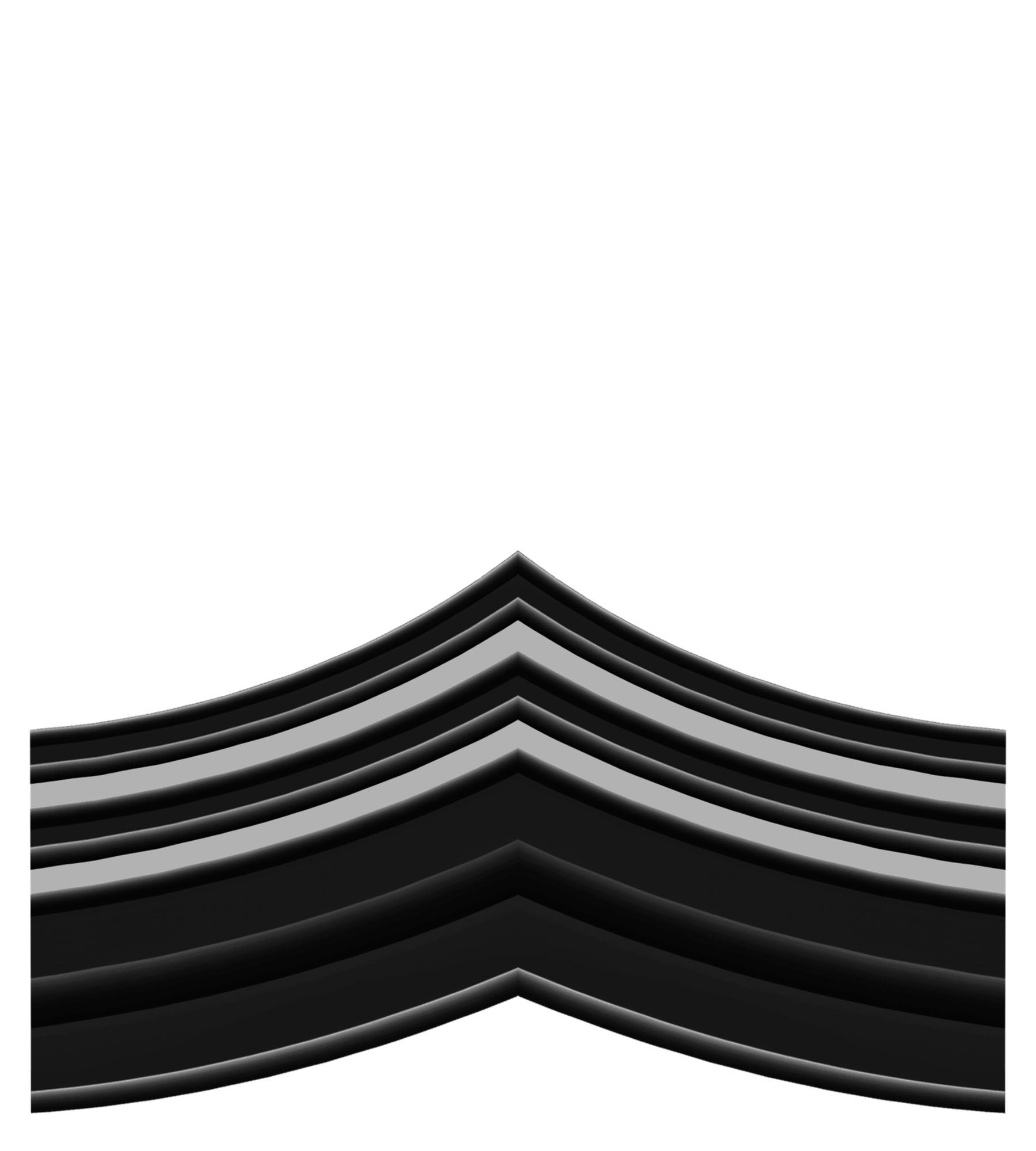
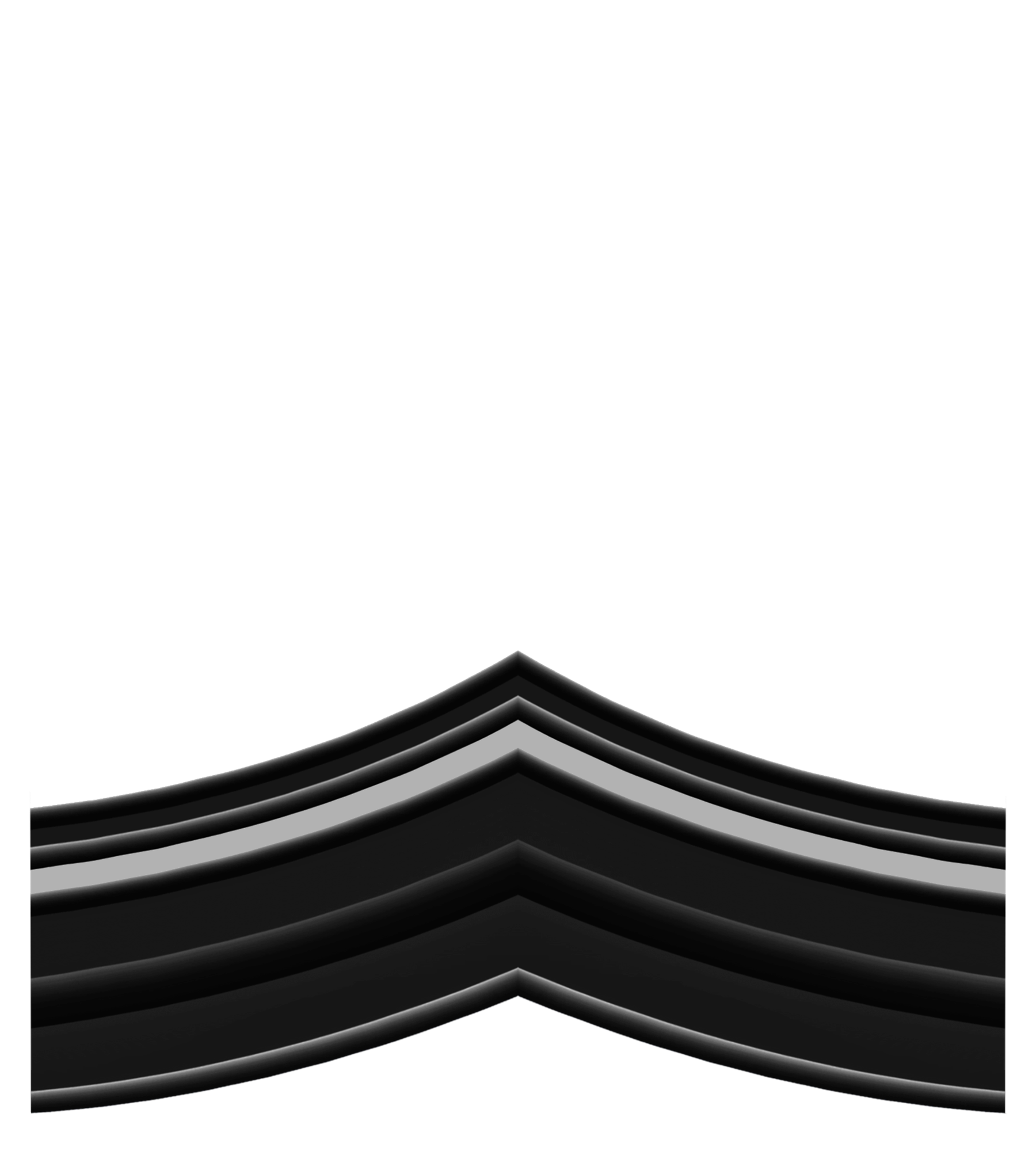
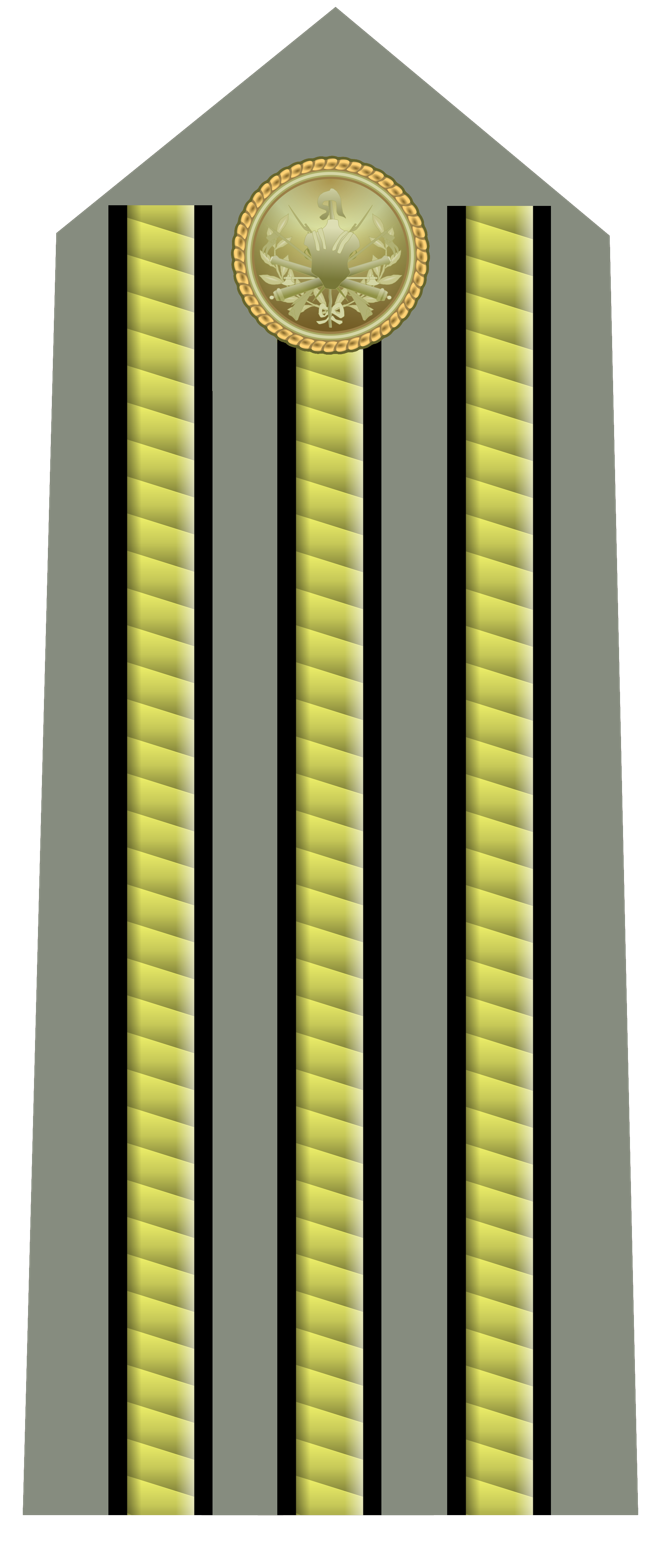
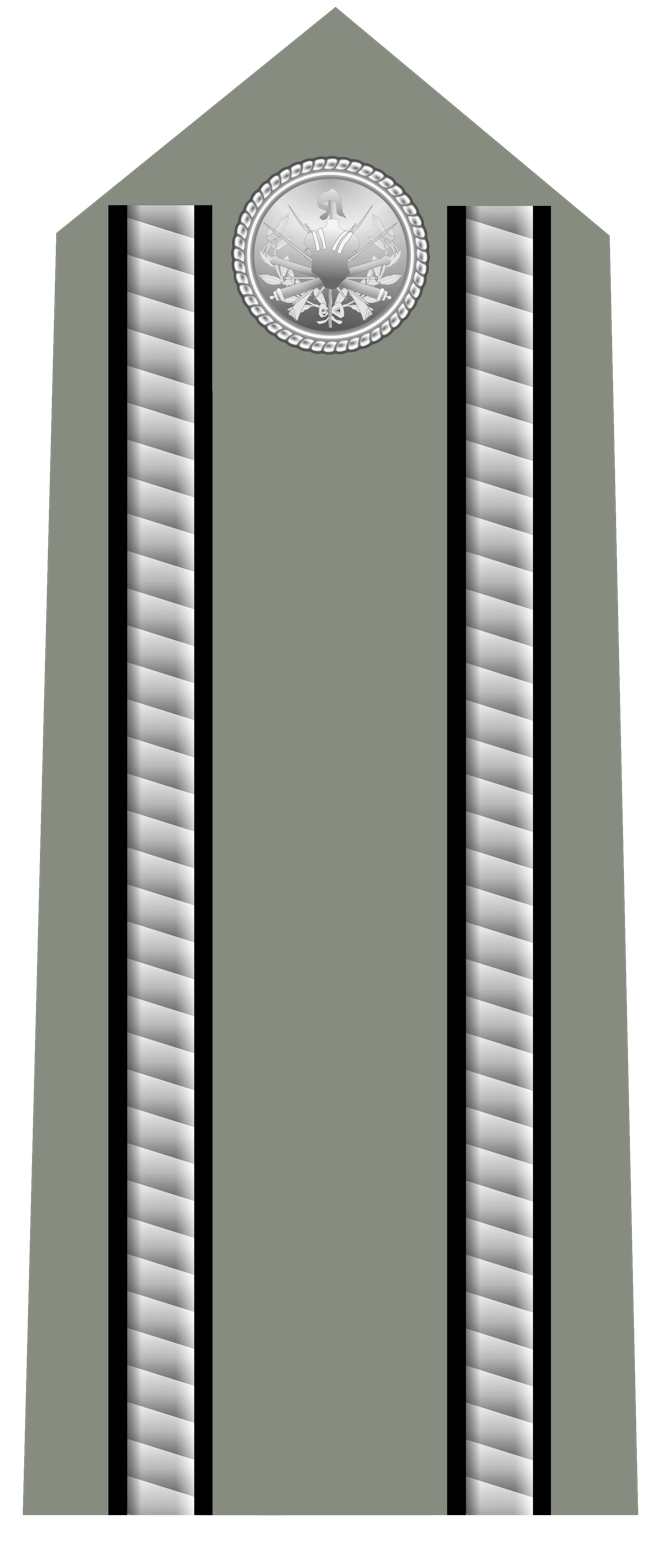
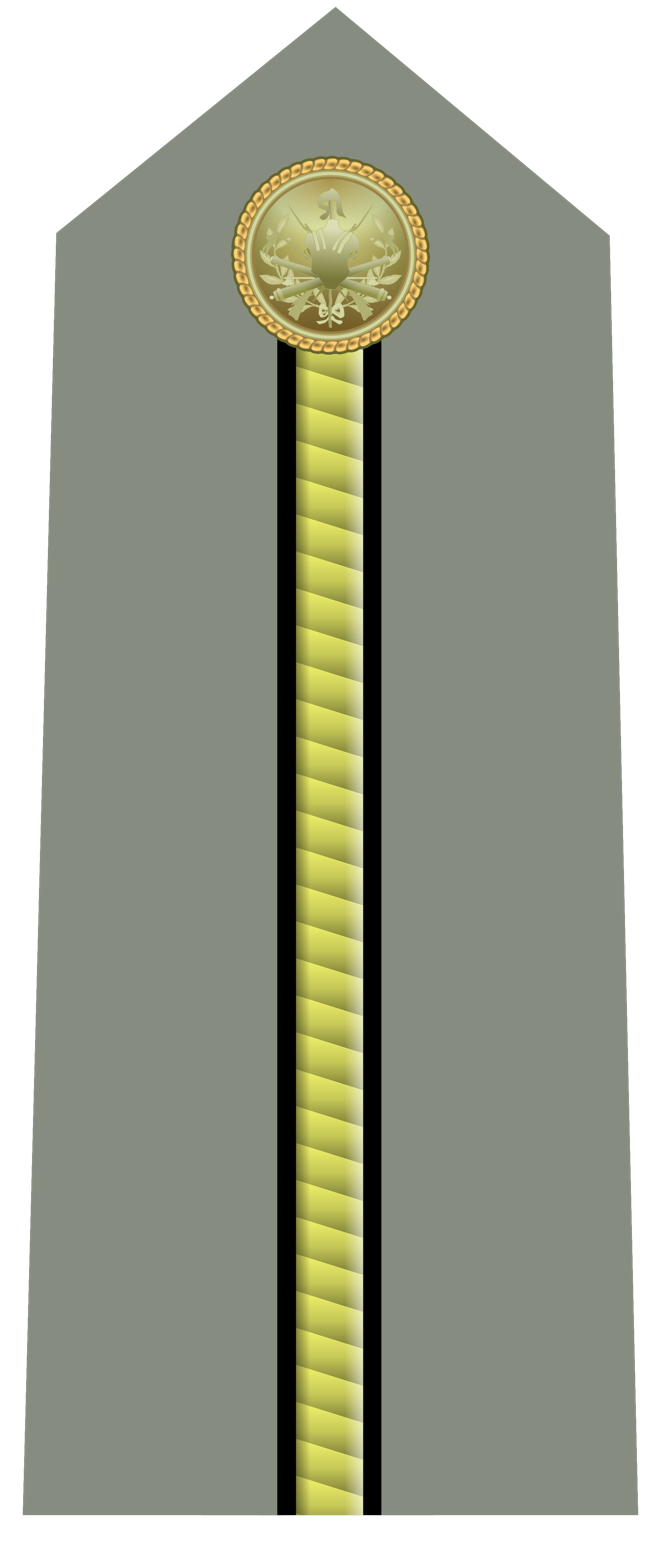
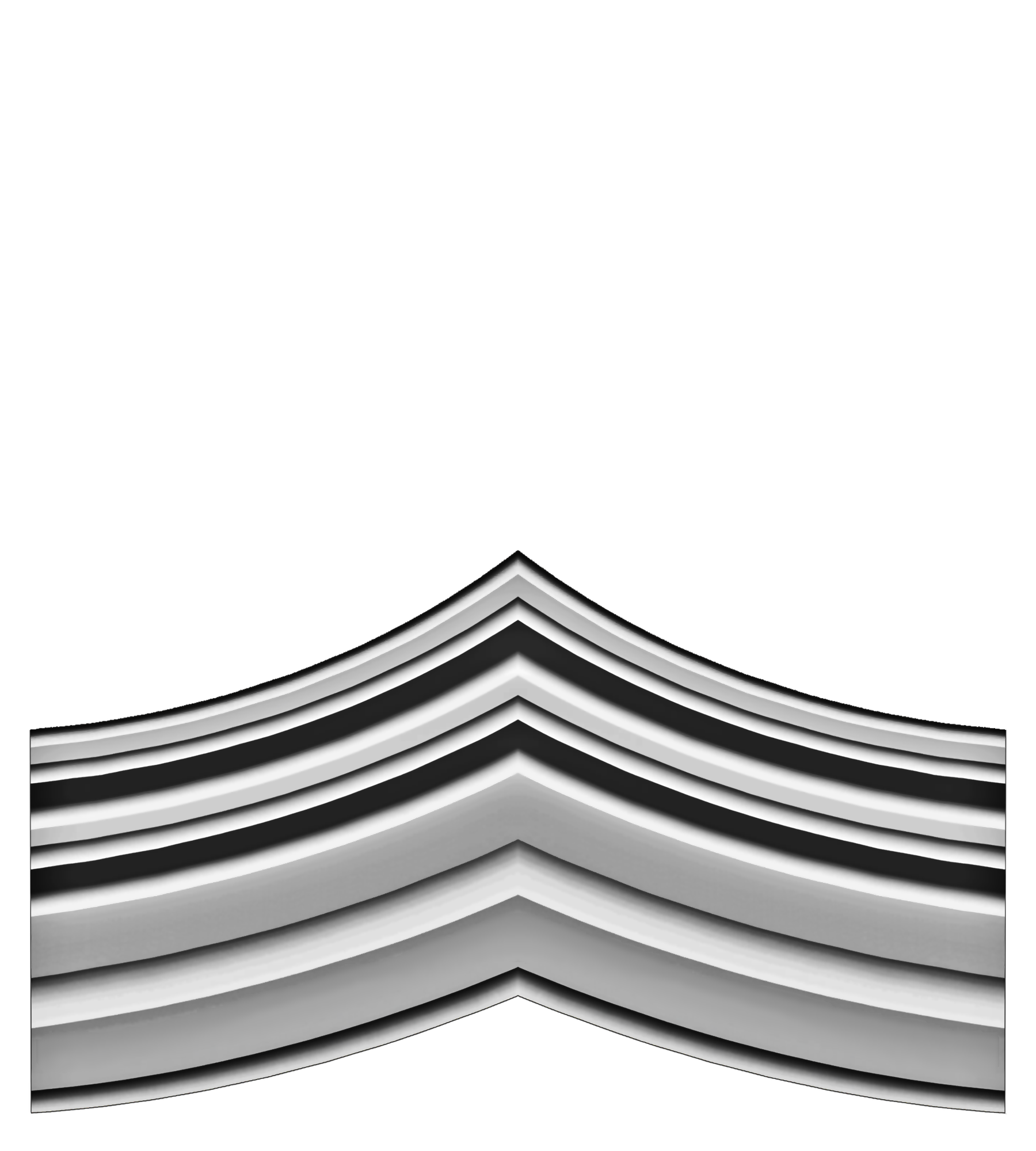
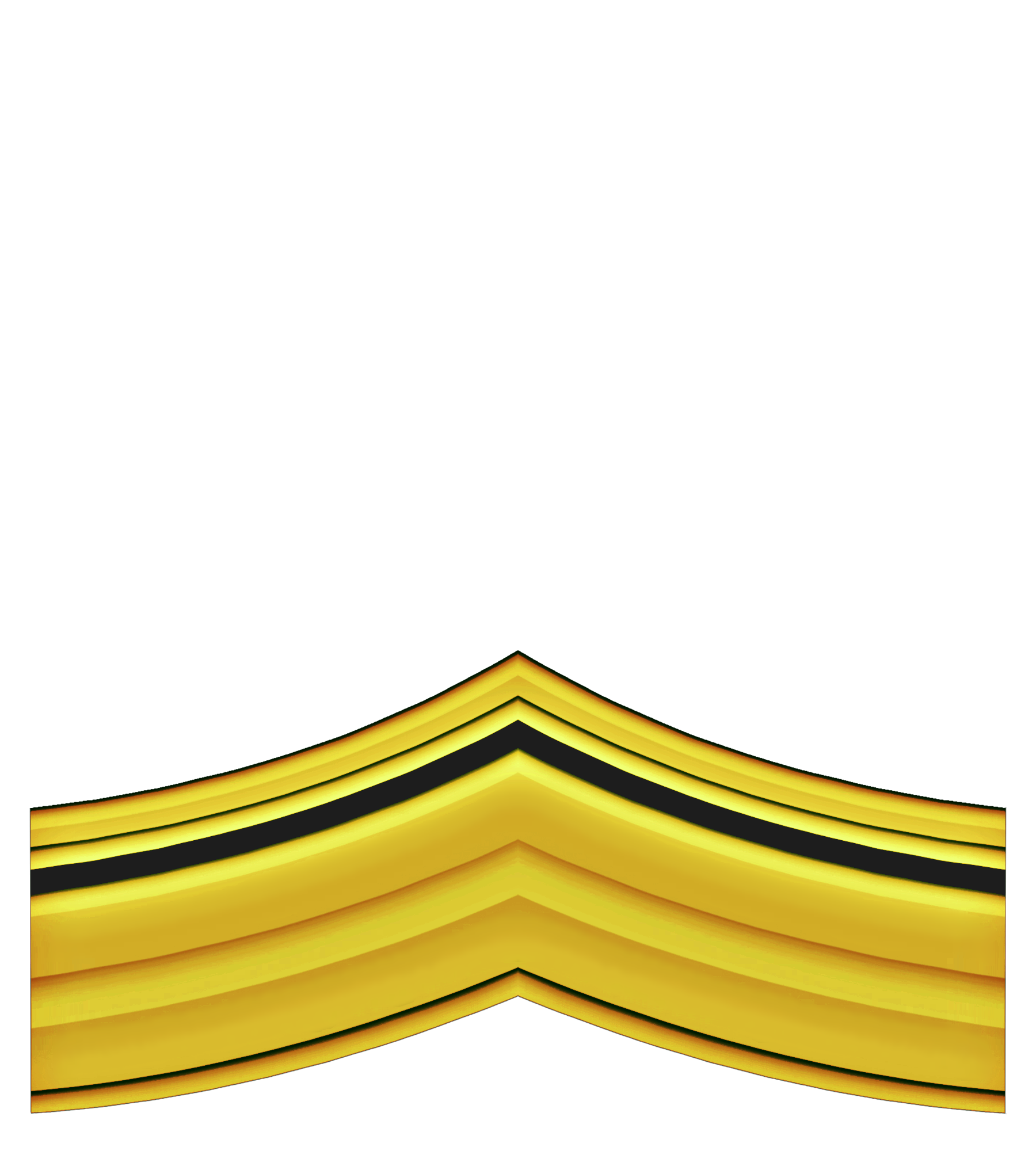
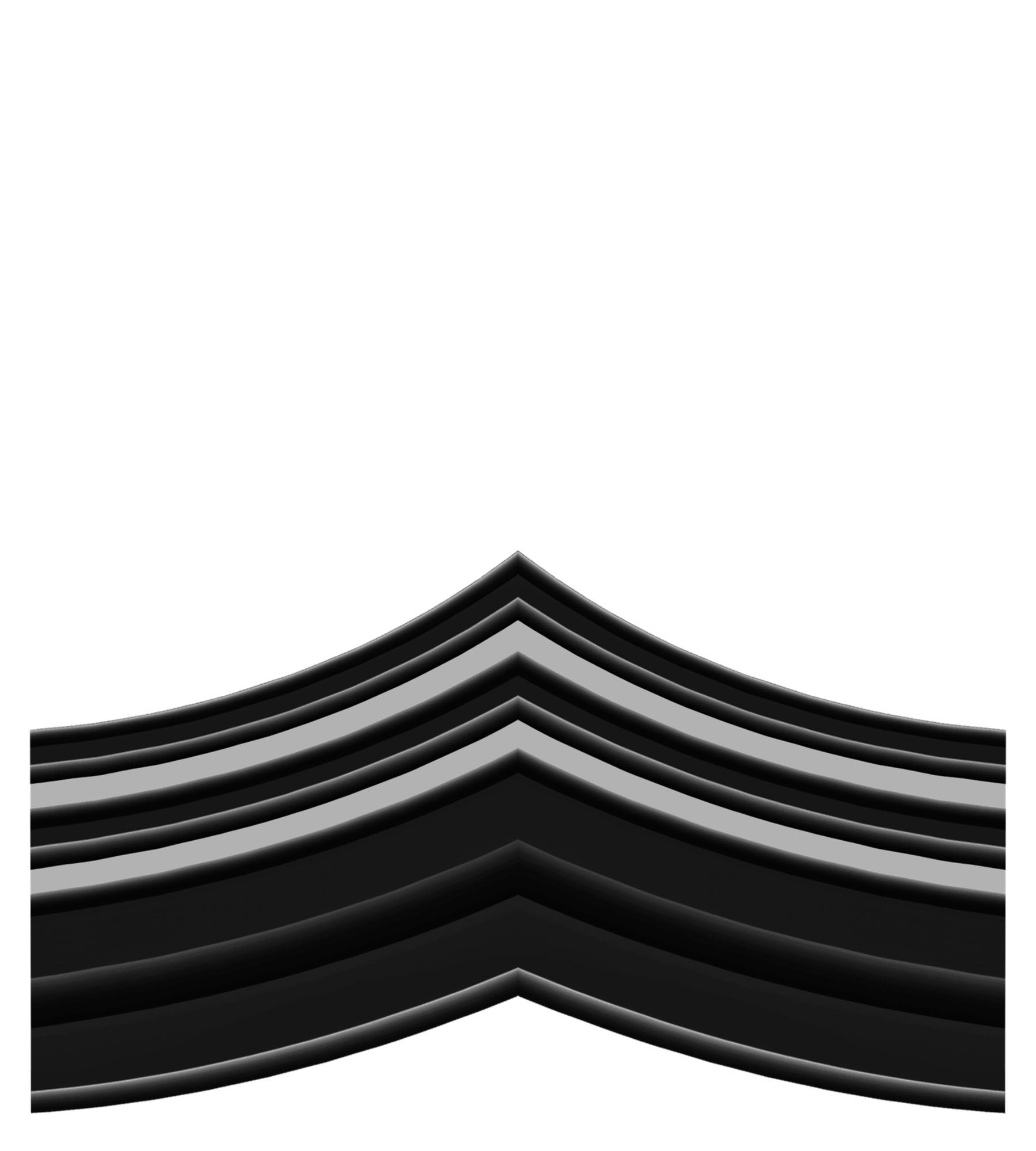
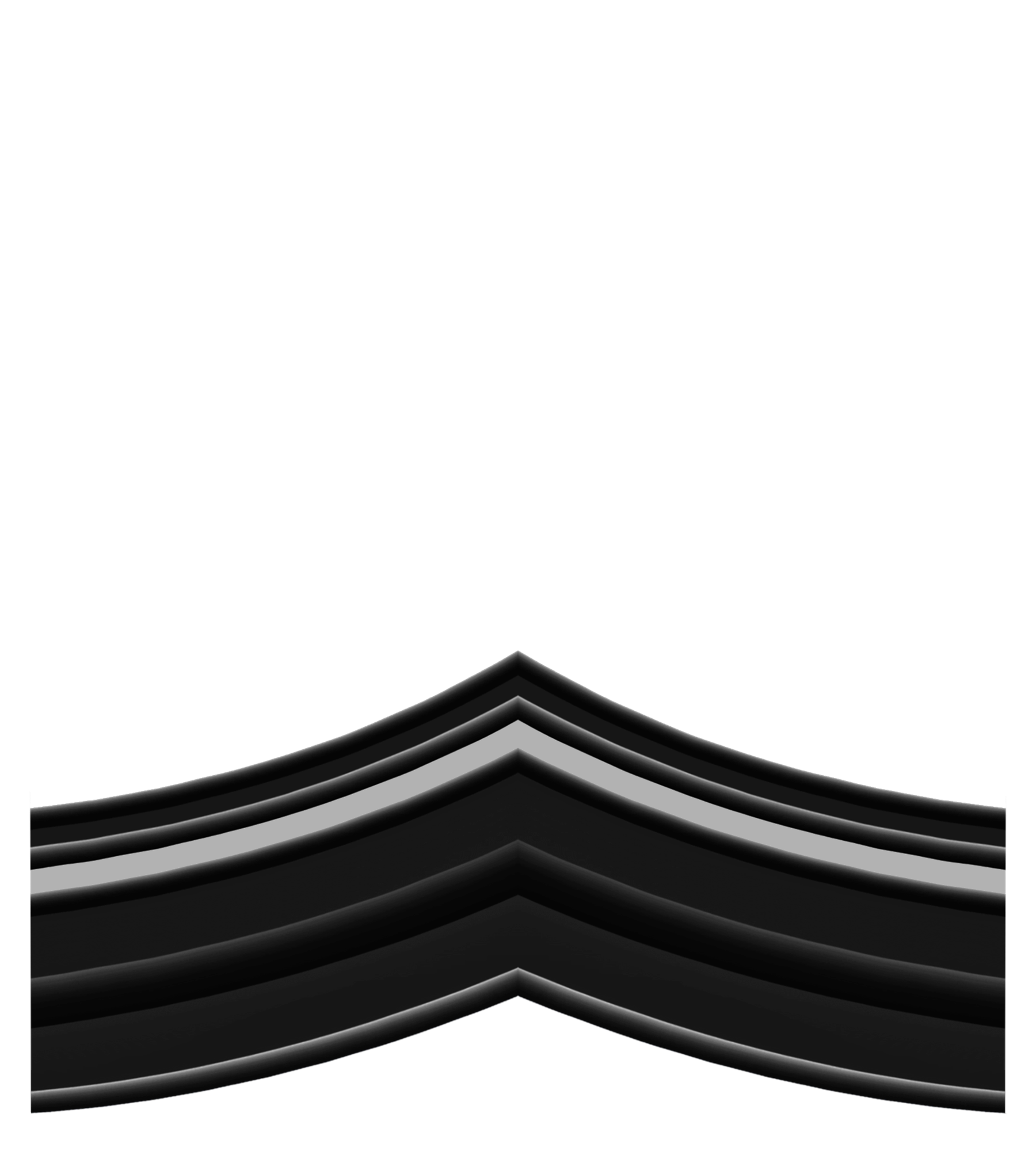
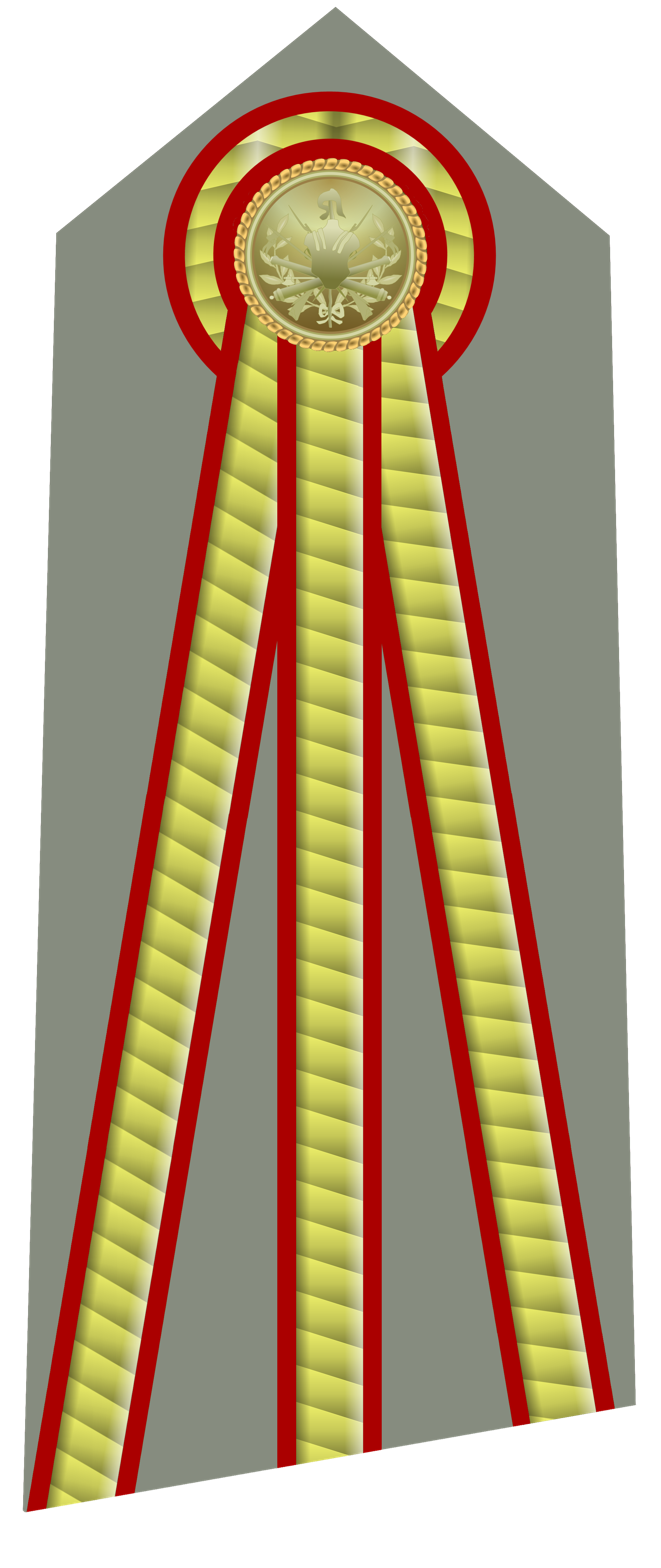
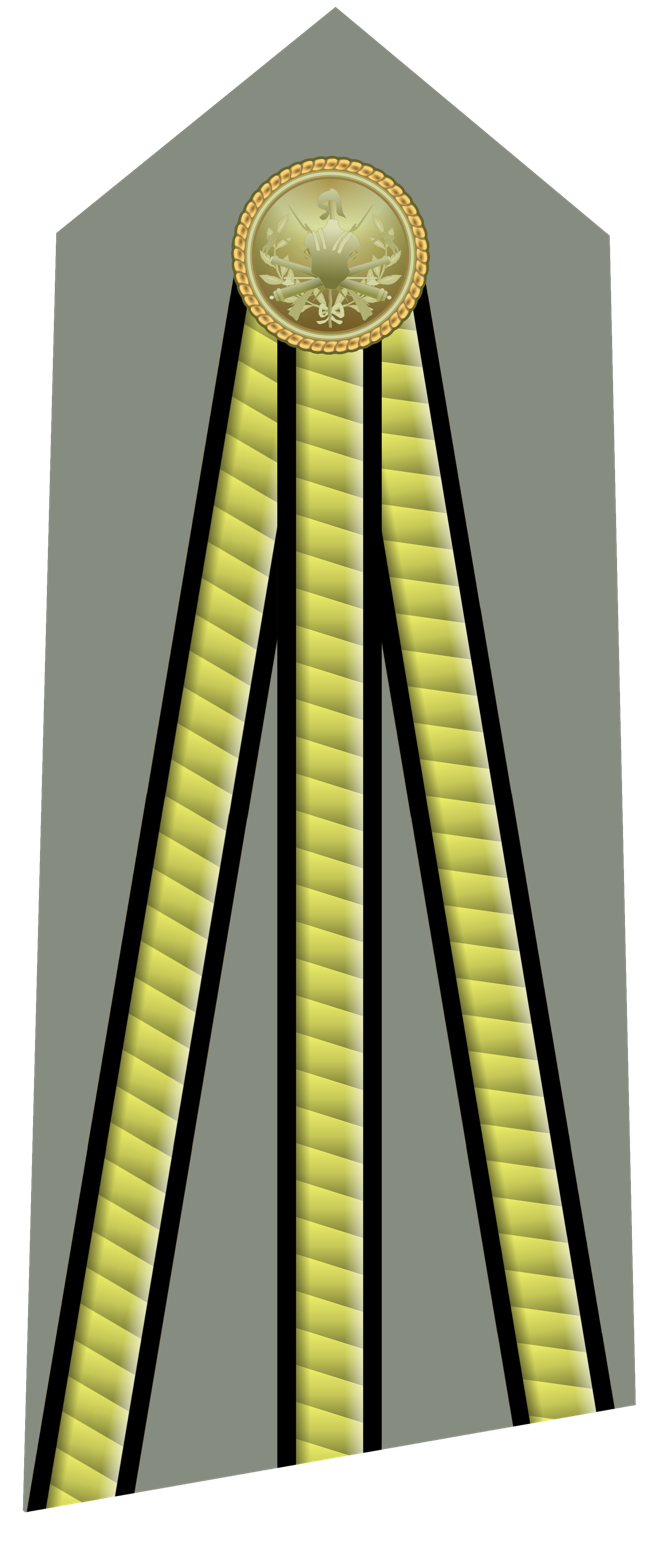
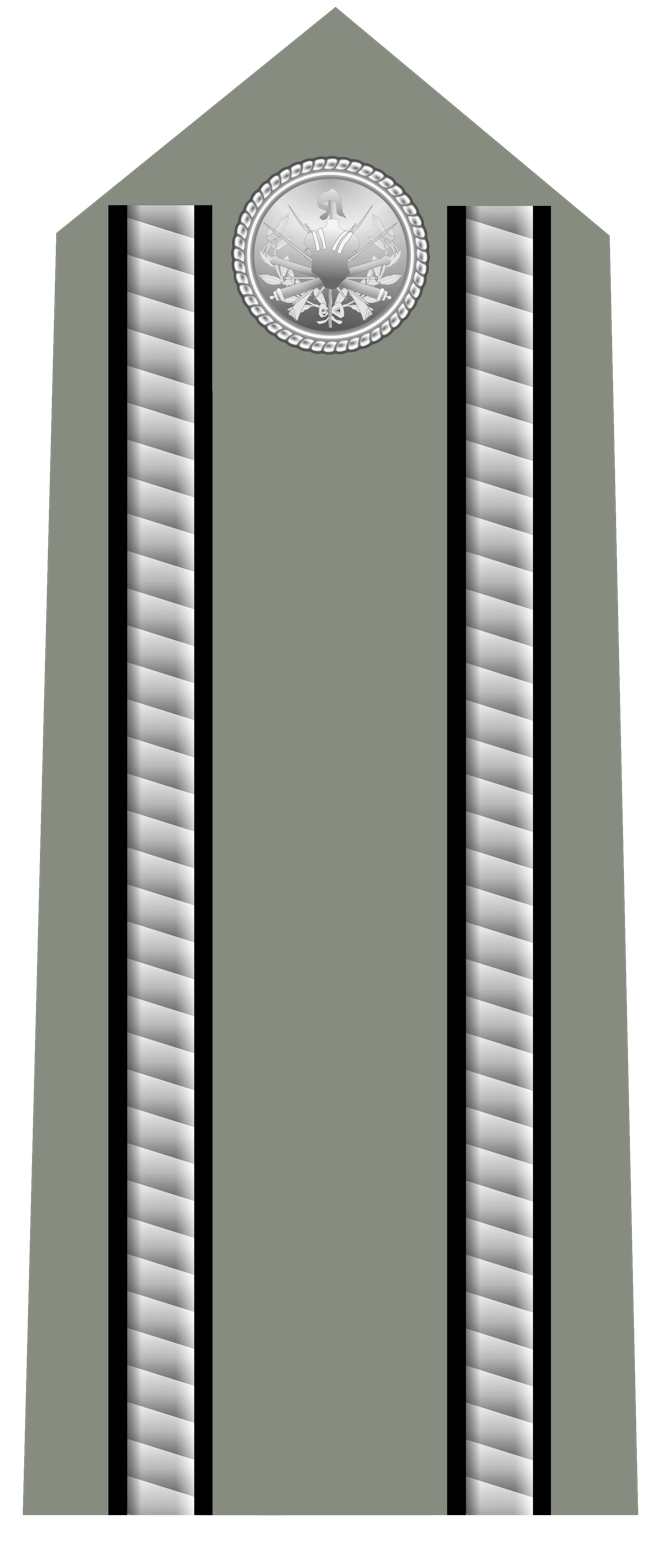
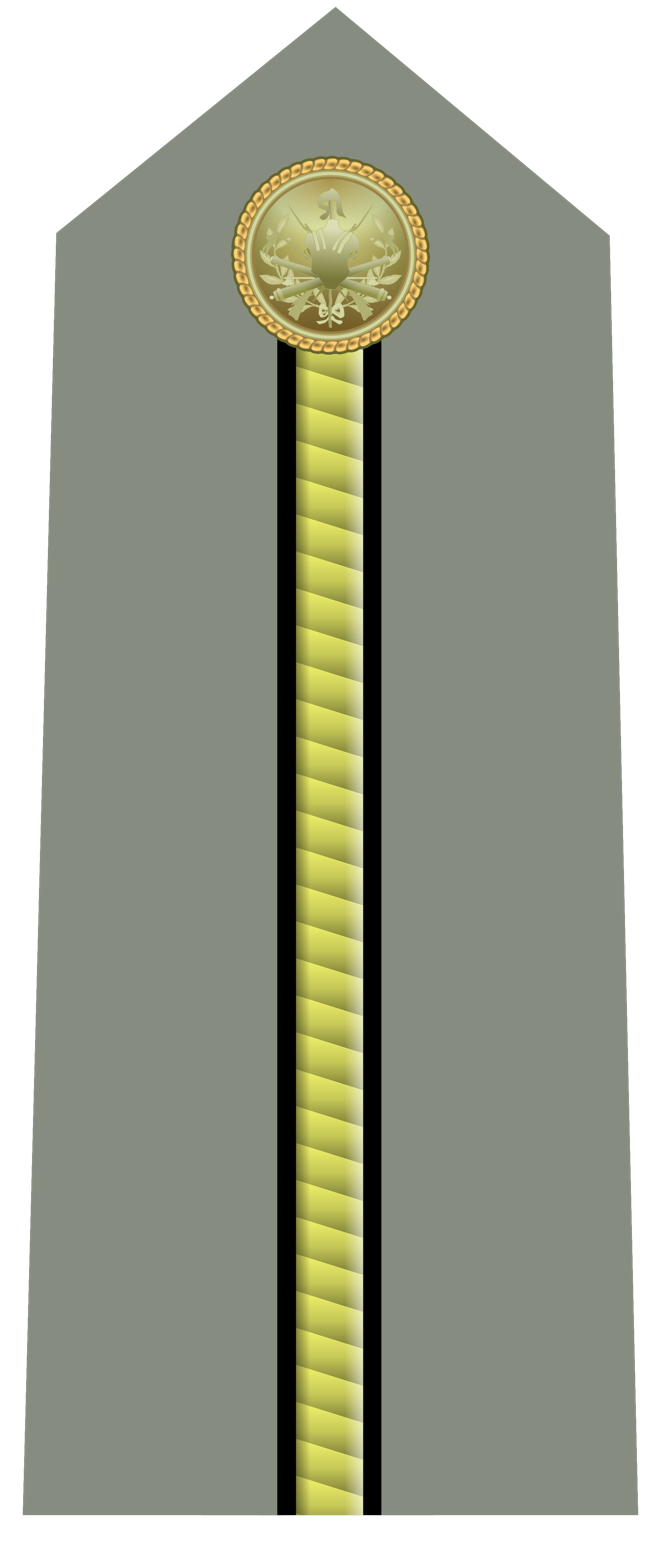
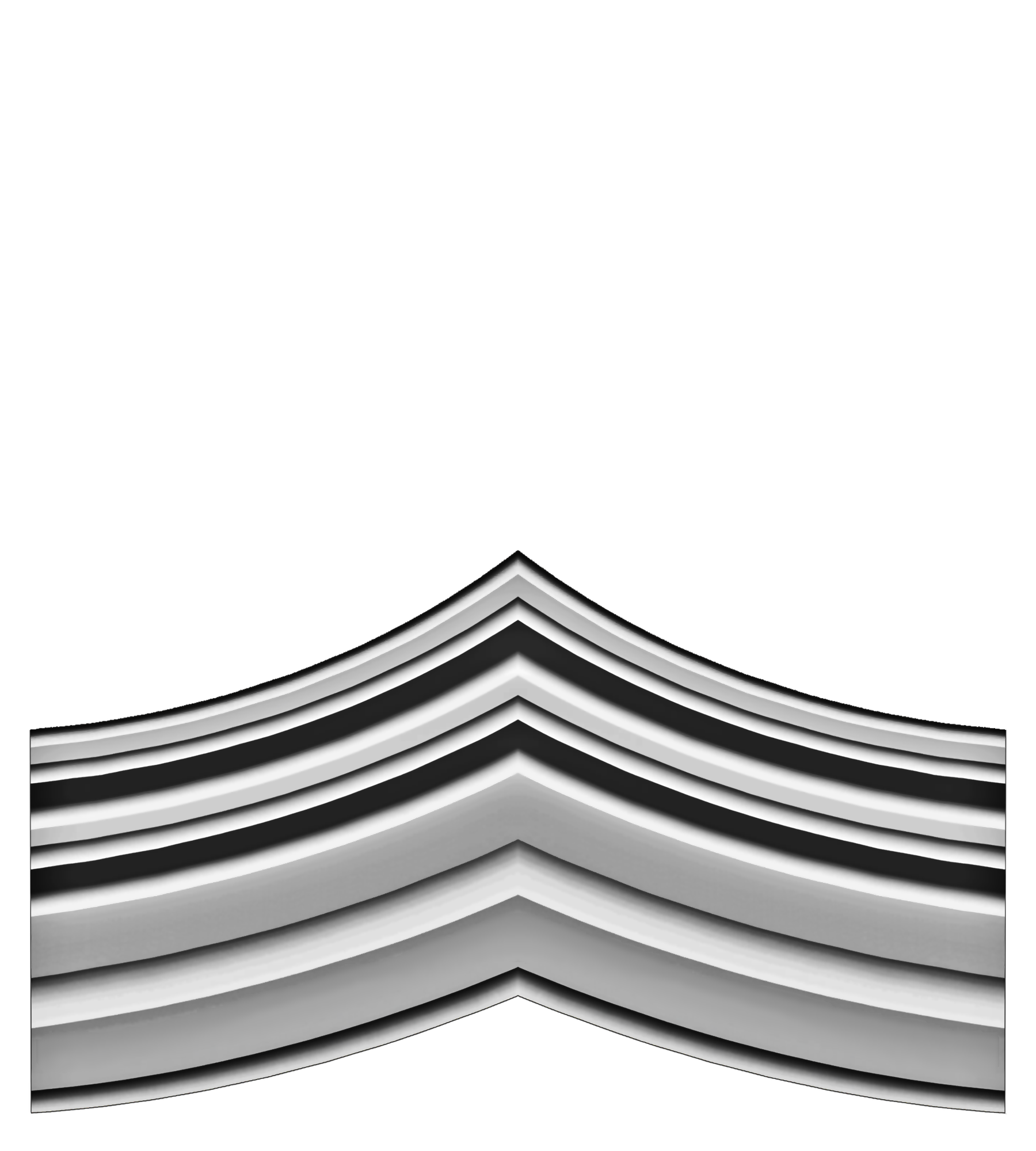
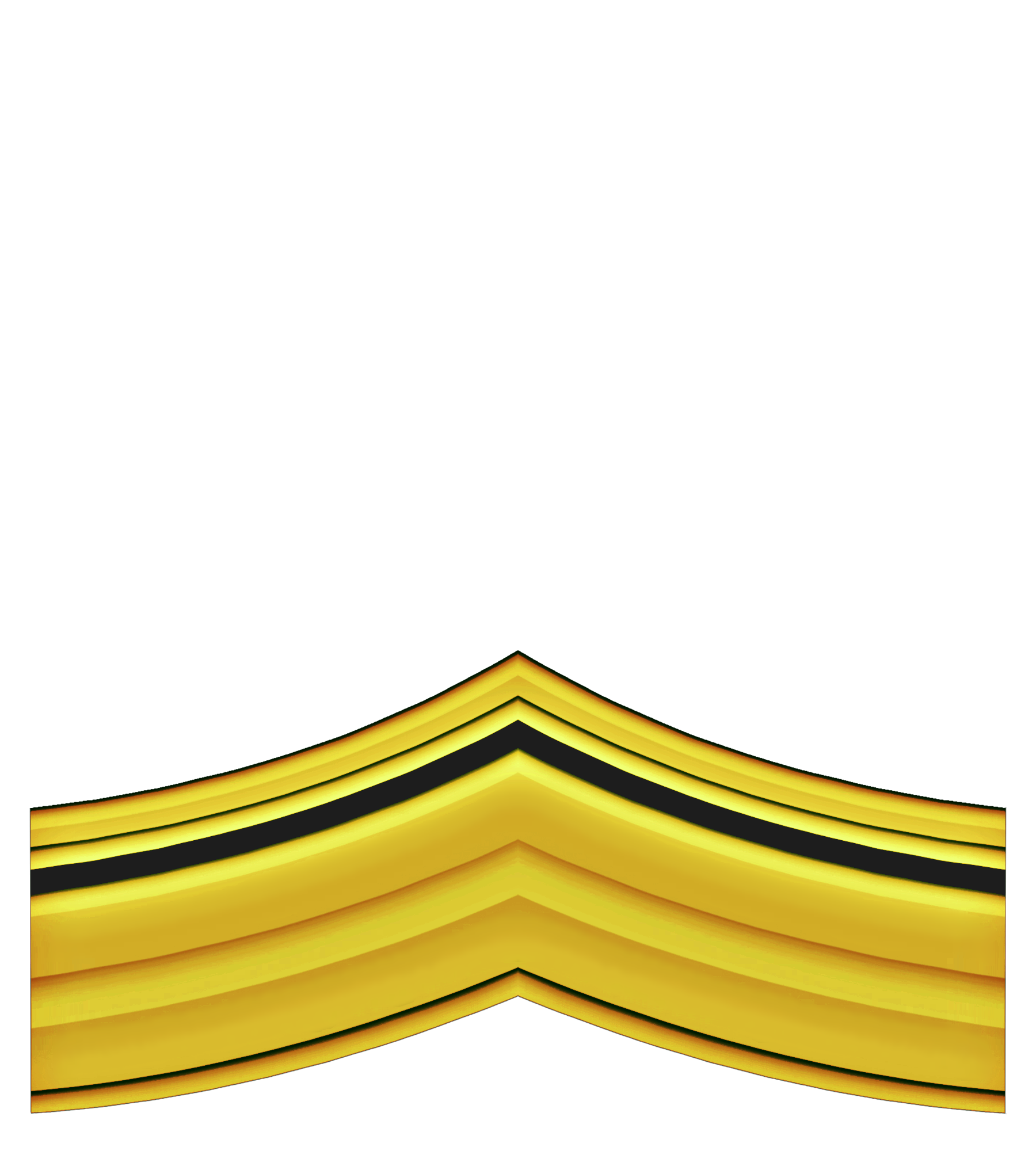
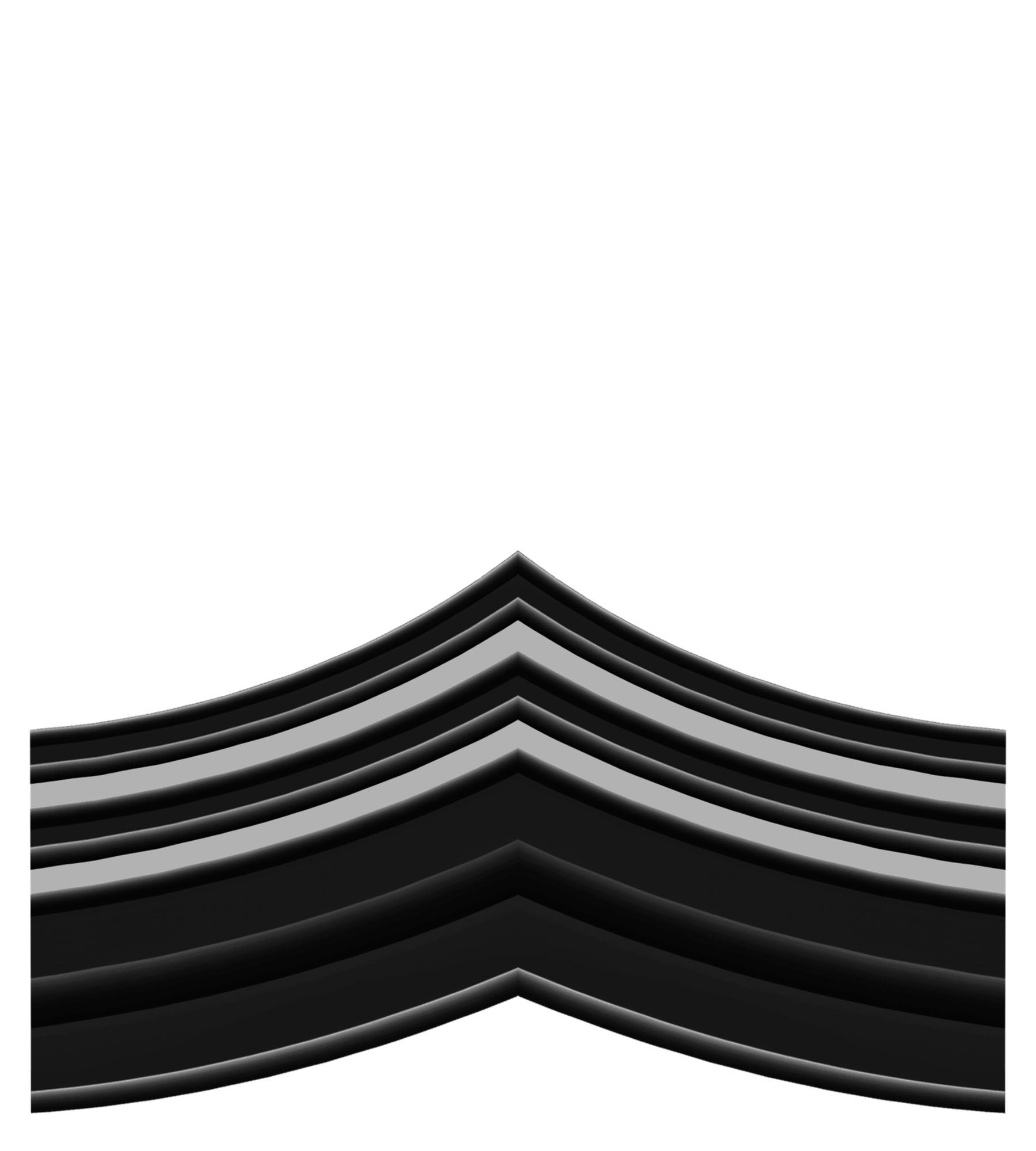
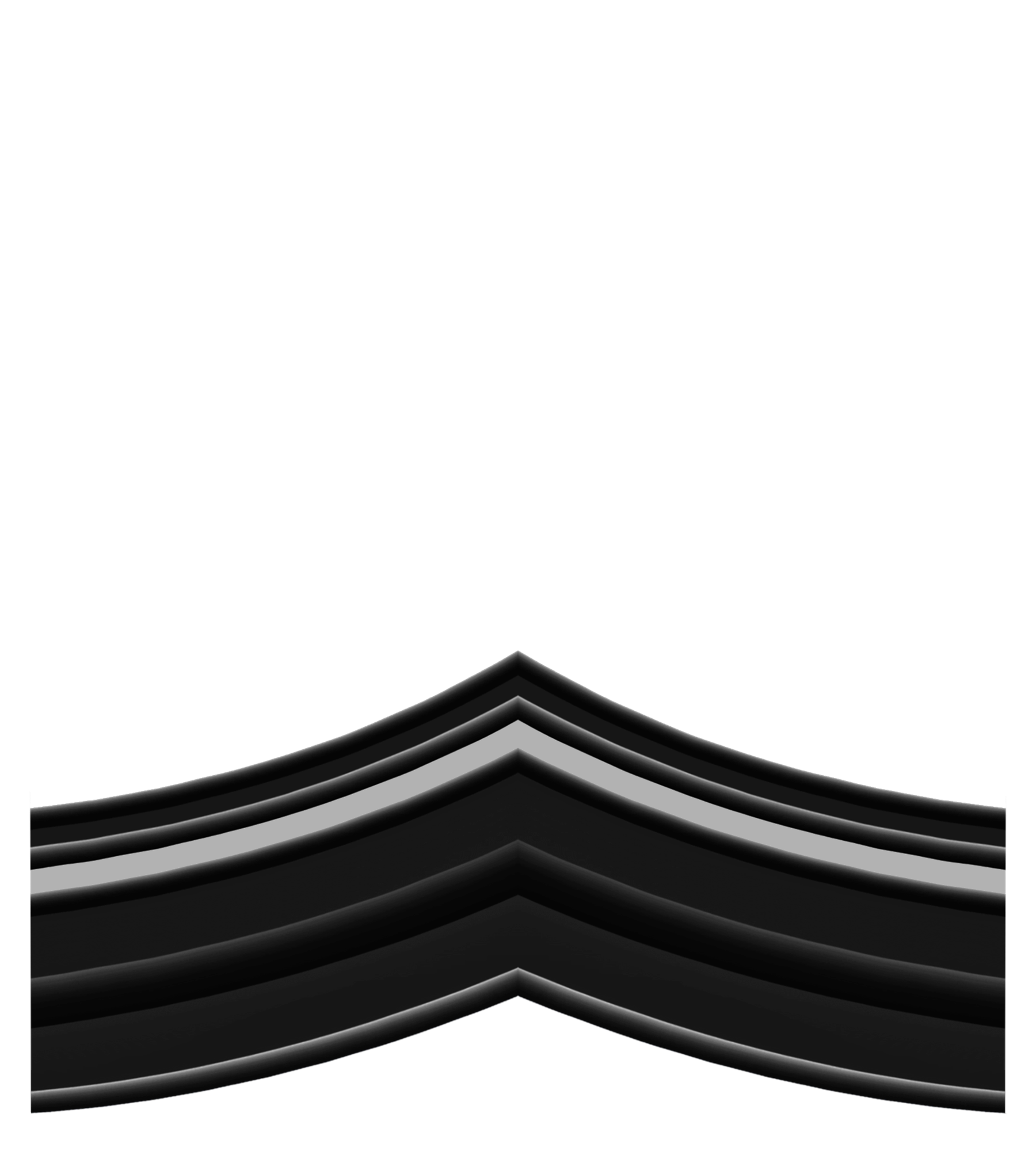
Rank group	Marshals				Sergeants		Enlisted
Royal Italian Army (1915–1920)									No insignia
Royal Italian Army (1915–1920)	Aiutante di battaglia	Maresciallo reggimentale	Maresciallo di battaglione o di squadrone	Maresciallo di compagnia	Sergente maggiore	Sergente	Caporale maggiore	Caporale	Soldato
Royal Italian Army (1920–1926)									No insignia
Royal Italian Army (1920–1926)	Aiutante di battaglia	Maresciallo maggiore	Maresciallo capo	Maresciallo ordinario	Sergente maggiore	Sergente	Caporale maggiore	Caporale	Soldato
(Kingdom of Italy) Royal Italian Army (1933–1940)									No insignia
(Kingdom of Italy) Royal Italian Army (1933–1940)	Aiutante di battaglia	Maresciallo maggiore	Maresciallo capo	Maresciallo ordinario	Sergente maggiore	Sergente	Caporale maggiore	Caporale	Soldato

== Royal Italian Navy ==
=== Commissioned officer ranks ===
The rank insignia of commissioned officers.

Rank group	General/flag officers					Senior officers			Junior officers
Regia Marina (1818-1923)
Regia Marina (1818-1923)		Ammiraglio		Vice ammiraglio	Contrammiraglio	Sotto ammiraglio	Capitano di vascello	Capitano di fregata	Capitano di corvetta	Primo tenente di vascello (Note: Same cuff insignia with bottom small gold cuff stripe)	Tenente di vascello	Sottotenente di vascello (Sub-lieutenant)	Guardiamarina; Midshipman
Regia Marina (1923-1938)
(1923-1926)	No rank	Ammiraglio	Vice ammiraglio d'armata	Vice ammiraglio di squadra	Contrammiraglio di divisione	Contrammiraglio	Capitano di vascello	Capitano di fregata	Capitano di corvetta	Primo tenente di vascello	Tenente di vascello	Sottotenente di vascello	Guardiamarina
(1926-1932)	Grande ammiraglio	Ammiraglio	Ammiraglio d'armata	Ammiraglio di squadra	Ammiraglio di divisione	Contrammiraglio	Capitano di vascello	Capitano di fregata	Capitano di corvetta	Primo tenente di vascello	Tenente di vascello	Sottotenente di vascello	Guardiamarina
(1932–1938)	Grande ammiraglio	Ammiraglio d'armata	Ammiraglio designato d'armata	Ammiraglio di squadra	Ammiraglio di divisione	Contrammiraglio	Capitano di vascello	Capitano di fregata	Capitano di corvetta	Primo tenente di vascello	Tenente di vascello	Sottotenente di vascello	Guardiamarina
Regia Marina (1938–1946)
Regia Marina (1938–1946)	Grande ammiraglio	Ammiraglio d'armata	Ammiraglio designato d'armata	Ammiraglio di Squadra	Ammiraglio di Divisione	Contrammiraglio	Capitano di Vascello	Capitano di Fregata	Capitano di corvetta	Primo Tenente di Vascello	Tenente di Vascello	Sottotenente di Vascello	Guardiamarina
Rank group	General/flag officers					Senior officers			Junior officers

=== Other ranks ===
The rank insignia of non-commissioned officers and enlisted personnel.

Rank group	Senior NCOs					Junior NCOs	Enlisted
Regia Marina (1938–1946)								No insignia
Regia Marina (1938–1946)	Capo di Prima Classe	Capo di Seconda Classe	Capo di Terza Classe	Secondo Capo	Sergente	Sottocapo	Comune di 1ª classe	Comune di 2ª classe

== Royal Italian Air Force ==
=== Commissioned officer ranks ===
The rank insignia of commissioned officers.

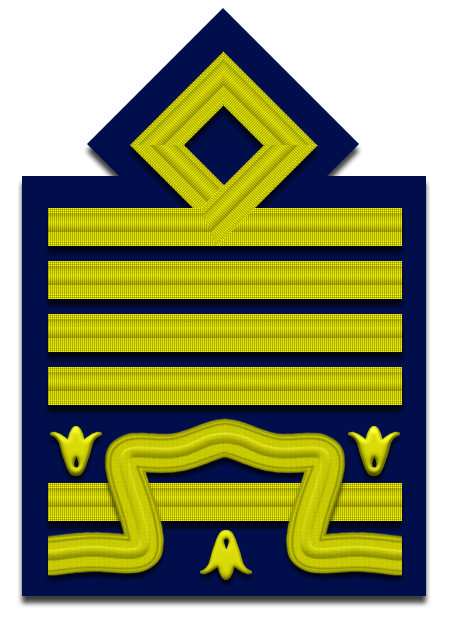
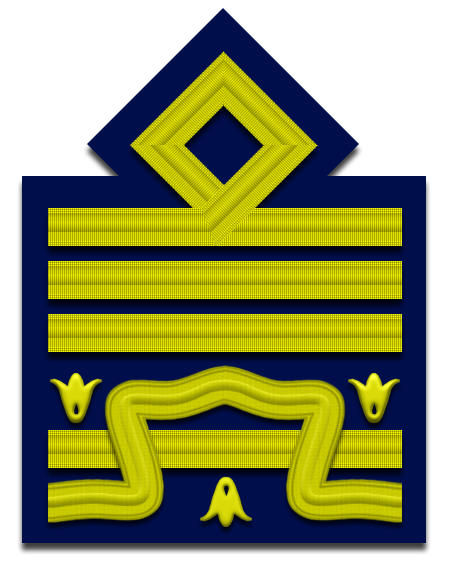
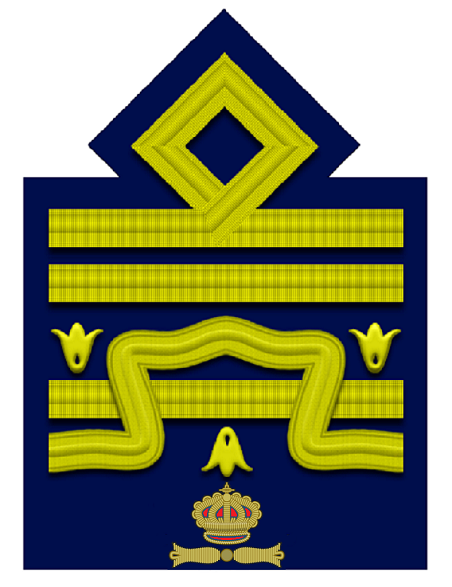
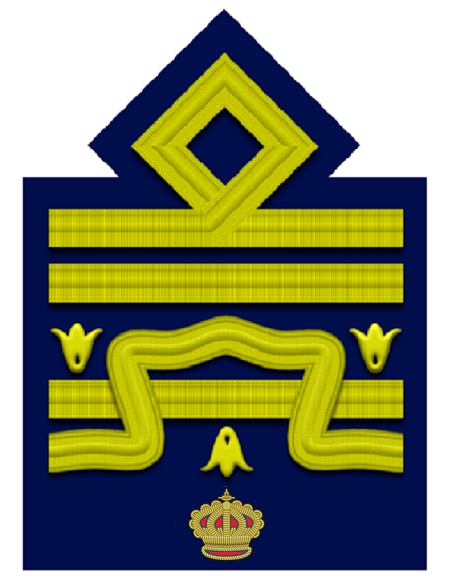
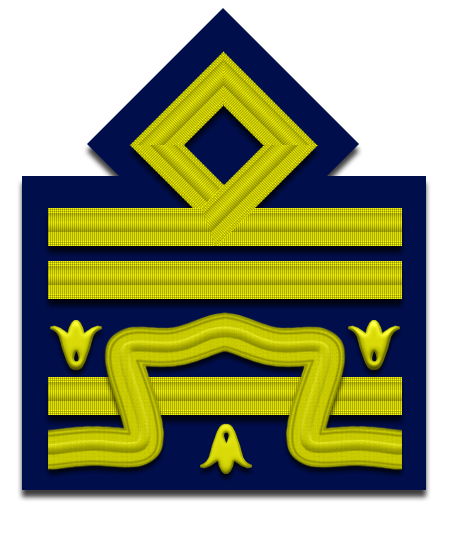
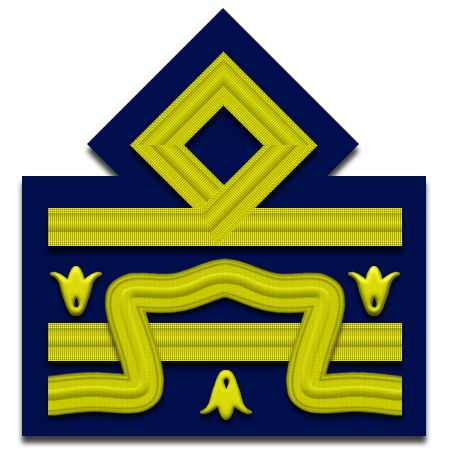
Rank group	General / flag officers						Senior officers			Junior officers
Regia Aeronautica
Regia Aeronautica	Maresciallo dell'Aria	Generale d'Armata Aerea	Generale designato d'Armata Aerea	Generale di Squadra Aerea	Generale di Divisione Aerea	Generale di Brigata Aerea	Colonnello	Tenente colonnello	Maggiore	Primo capitano	Capitano	Tenente	Sottotenente

=== Other ranks ===
The rank insignia of non-commissioned officers and enlisted personnel.

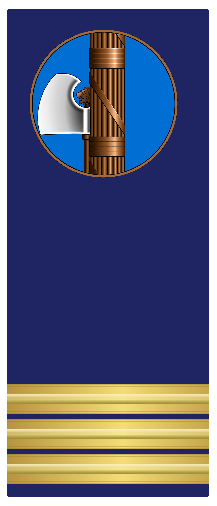
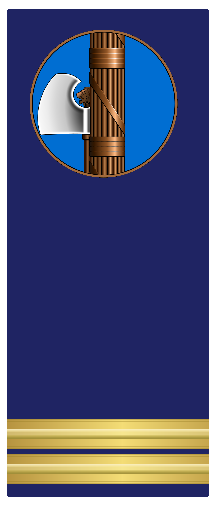
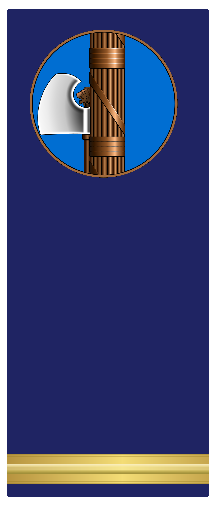
Rank group	Senior NCOs					Junior NCOs	Enlisted
Regia Aeronautica								No insignia
Regia Aeronautica	Maresciallo di Prima Classe	Maresciallo di Seconda Classe	Maresciallo di Terza Classe	Sergente Maggiore	Sergente	Caporal Maggiore	Caporale	Soldato

== Blackshirts ==
=== Special insignia ===
Rank group	Honorary
	Primo caporale d'onore	Caporale d'onore
	First honorary corporal	Honorary corporal

=== Commissioned officer ranks ===
The rank insignia of commissioned officers.

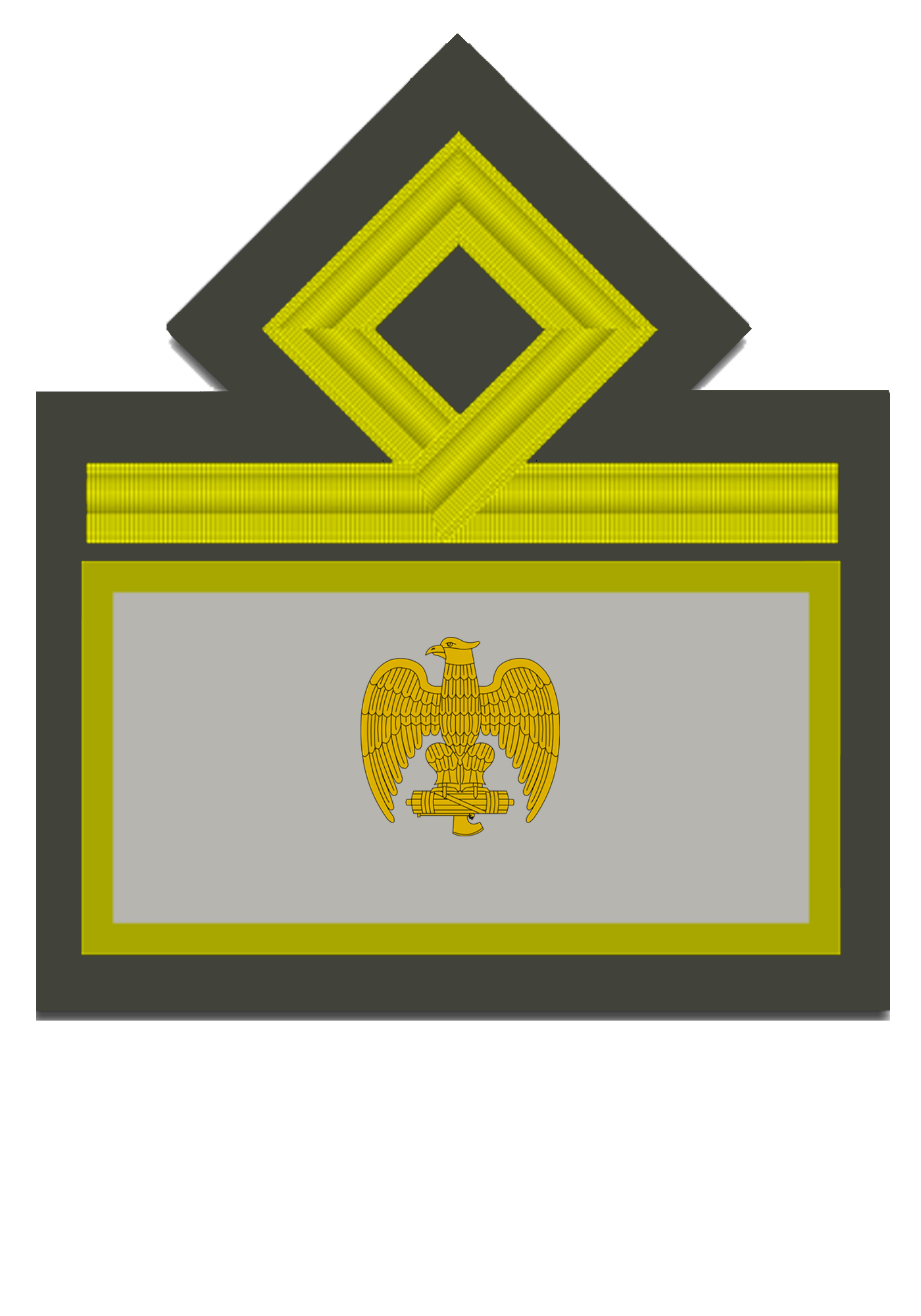
Rank group	General / flag officers				Senior officers			Junior officers
1923–1935
1935–1938
1938–1943
1938–1943	Comandante generale	Luogotenente generale (Capo di stato maggiore)	Luogotenente generale	Console generale	Console	Primo seniore	Seniore	Centurione	Capo manipolo	Sottocapo manipolo

==== Student officer ranks ====
Year	1923–1935	1935–1938	1938–1943
Aspirante

=== Other ranks ===
The rank insignia of non-commissioned officers and enlisted personnel.

Rank group	Senior NCOs					Junior NCOs		Enlisted
1923–1931								No insignia	No insignia
1931–1938								No insignia	No insignia
1938–1943								No insignia	No insignia
1938–1943	Primo aiutante	Aiutante capo	Aiutante	Primo capo squadra	Capo squadra	Vice capo squadra	Camicia nera scelta	Camicia nera	Legionario

== See also ==
- Ranks and insignia of the National Fascist Party
- Military ranks of the Italian Social Republic
- Royal Corps of Colonial Troops#Ranks
