= Operation Husky order of battle =

Operation Husky order of battle is a listing of the significant military and air force units that were involved in the campaign for Sicily, July 10 – August 17, 1943.

== Allied forces ==
Allied Forces Headquarters - Mediterranean
Supreme Commander: General Dwight D. Eisenhower

=== Allied 15th Army Group ===
The Allied 15th Army Group was under the command of General Sir Harold Alexander.

- U.S. 9th Infantry Division
  Commanded by Major General Manton S. Eddy.
  - 39th Infantry Regiment
  - 47th Infantry Regiment
  - 60th Infantry Regiment
  - 26th Field Artillery Battalion
  - 34th Field Artillery Battalion
  - 60th Field Artillery Battalion
  - 84th Field Artillery Battalion
  - 15th Engineer Combat Battalion
  - 42nd Anti-Aircraft Battalion
  - 9th Reconnaissance Troop
- U.S. 82nd Airborne Division
  Commanded by Major General Matthew Ridgway. The independent 509th Parachute Infantry Battalion was held in reserve and it never saw action.
  - 504th Parachute Infantry Regiment
  - 505th Parachute Infantry Regiment
  - 325th Glider Infantry Regiment not in operation Husky
  - 376th Parachute Field Artillery Battalion
  - 456th Parachute Field Artillery Battalion
  - 319th Glider Field Artillery Battalion
  - 320th Glider Field Artillery Battalion
  - 307th Airborne Engineer Battalion
  - 80th Airborne Anti-Aircraft Battalion
- 46th British Infantry Division
  Commanded by Major General H. A. Freeman-Attwood.
  - 128th Infantry Brigade
  - 138th Infantry Brigade
  - 139th Infantry Brigade
  - 46th Royal Artillery Brigade
  - 46th Royal Engineer Brigade

==== U.S. Seventh Army ====
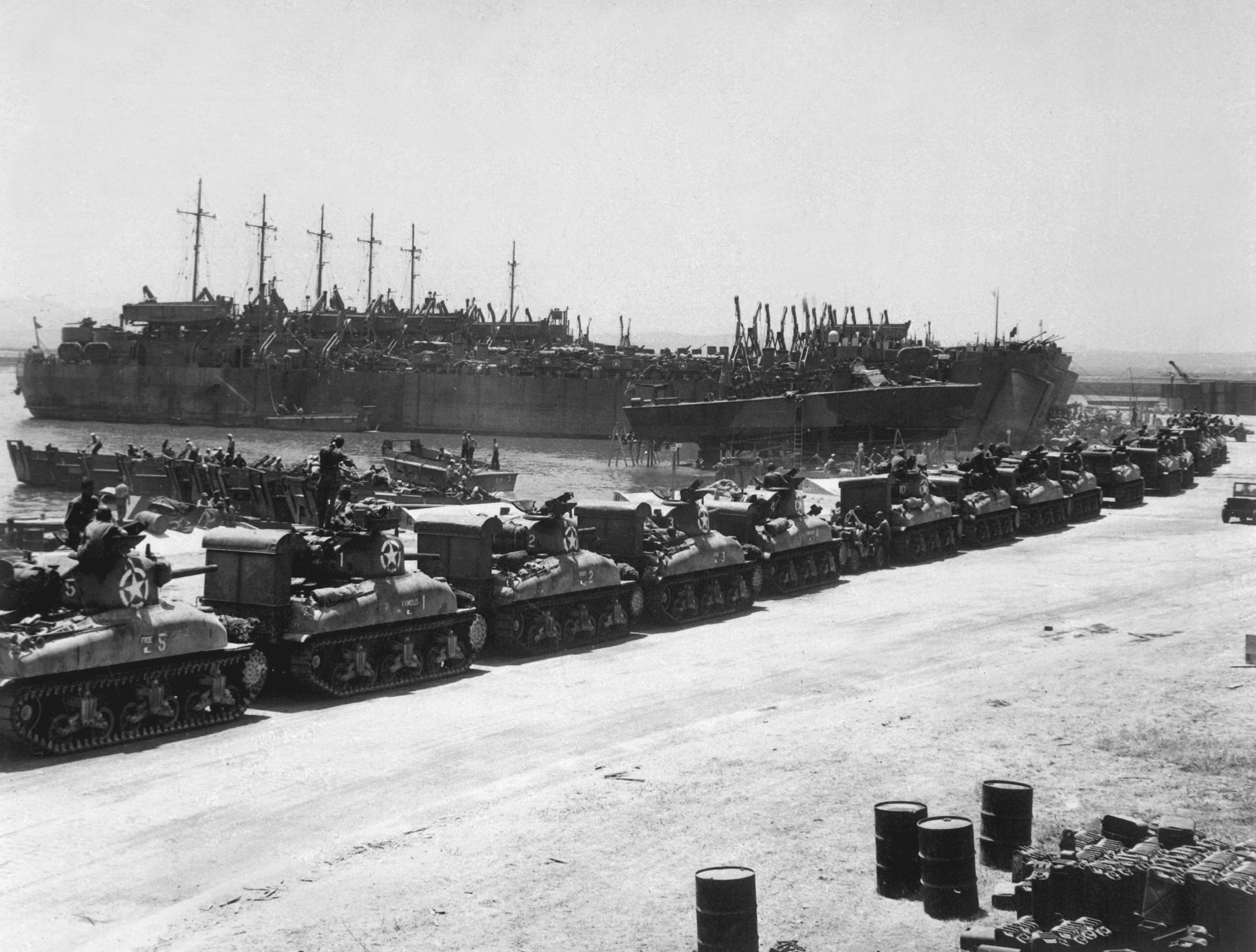
Waiting to load Tanks in La Pècherie French base in French Tunisia.

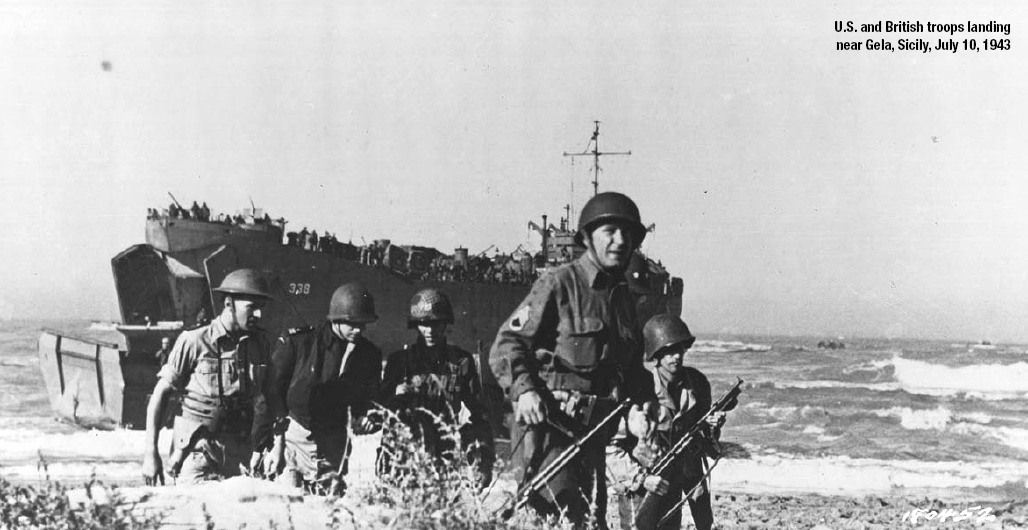
American and British troops landing near Gela, Sicily, July 10, 1943.

The U.S. Seventh Army was commanded by Lieutenant General George S. Patton.

- 1st Ranger Battalion
- 3rd Ranger Battalion
- 4th Ranger Battalion
- 70th Tank Battalion
- 753rd Tank Battalion
- 601st Tank Destroyer Battalion
- 813th Tank Destroyer Battalion - two platoons
- 39th Engineer Regiment
- 540th Engineer Shore Regiment
- 5th Armored Artillery Group
  - 58th Armored Field Artillery Battalion
  - 62nd Armored Field Artillery Battalion
  - 65th Armored Field Artillery Battalion
- 17th Field Artillery Regiment
- 36th Artillery Regiment
- 77th Artillery Regiment
- 178th Artillery Regiment
- Free French 4th Moroccan Tabor

===== U.S. II Corps =====
The U.S. II Corps was commanded by Lieutenant General Omar Bradley.

- U.S. 1st Infantry Division
  First commanded by Major General Terry Allen He was replaced by Major General Clarence R. Huebner on August 7.
  - 16th Infantry Regiment
  - 18th Infantry Regiment
  - 26th Infantry Regiment
  - 5th Field Artillery Battalion
  - 7th Field Artillery Battalion
  - 32nd Field Artillery Battalion
  - 33rd Field Artillery Battalion
  - 1st Engineer Combat Battalion
  - 1st Reconnaissance Troop
- U.S. 45th Infantry Division
  Commanded by Major General Troy H. Middleton.
  - 157th Infantry Regiment
  - 179th Infantry Regiment
  - 180th Infantry Regiment
  - 158th Field Artillery Battalion
  - 160th Field Artillery Battalion
  - 171st Field Artillery Battalion
  - 189th Field Artillery Battalion
  - 645th Tank Destroyer Battalion
  - 120th Engineer Combat Battalion
  - 45th Reconnaissance Troop

===== U.S. Provisional Corps =====
(Headquarters activated on 15 July 1943) Commanded by Major General Geoffrey Keyes.

- U.S. 2nd Armored Division
  Commanded by Major General Hugh Joseph Gaffey. Divisional units were placed under the combat commands as needed.
  - Combat Command A
  - Combat Command B
  - 41st Armored Infantry Regiment
  - 66th Armored Regiment
  - 67th Armored Regiment
  - 14th Armored Field Artillery Battalion
  - 78th Armored Field Artillery Battalion
  - 92nd Armored Field Artillery Battalion
  - 17th Armored Engineer Battalion
  - 82nd Armored Reconnaissance Battalion
- U.S. 3rd Infantry Division
  Commanded by Major General Lucian Truscott
  - 7th Infantry Regiment
  - 15th Infantry Regiment
  - 30th Infantry Regiment
  - 9th Field Artillery Battalion
  - 10th Field Artillery Battalion
  - 39th Field Artillery Battalion
  - 41st Field Artillery Battalion
  - 10th Engineer Combat Battalion

==== British Eighth Army ====
The British Eighth Army was under the command of General Sir Bernard Montgomery. The British 46th Infantry Division formed a floating reserve, but it did not participate in the Sicily campaign.

Army Troops

- 2nd Special Air Service
- No. 3 (Army) Commando
- No. 40 (Royal Marine) Commando
- No. 41 (Royal Marine) Commando
- Three companies of 2nd/7th Battalion, Middlesex Regiment
- 2nd/4th Battalion, Hampshire Regiment
- 1st Battalion, Argyll and Sutherland Highlanders
- 2nd Battalion, Highland Light Infantry
- 1st Battalion, Welch Regiment
- 7th Battalion, Royal Marines

===== British XIII Corps =====
XIII Corps was commanded by Lieutenant-General Miles Dempsey.

- 105th Anti-Tank Regiment, Royal Artillery
- 6th Army Group Royal Artillery
  - 24th Field Regiment, Royal Artillery
  - 98th (Surrey & Sussex Yeomanry Queen Mary's) Field Regiment, Royal Artillery
  - 111th Field Regiment, Royal Artillery
  - 66th Medium Regiment, Royal Artillery
  - 75th (Shropshire Yeomanry) Medium Regiment, Royal Artillery
  - 80th (Scottish Horse Yeomanry) Medium Regiment, Royal Artillery
- XIII Corps Troops Royal Engineers
    - 56th Field Company, Royal Engineers
    - 576th Corps Field Park Company, Royal Engineers
    - 577th Army Field Company, Royal Engineers
    - 578th Army Field Company, Royal Engineers
- 5th Infantry Division
  Commanded by Major-General Horatio Berney-Ficklin (succeeded by Major-General Gerard Bucknall on 3 August).
  - 13th Infantry Brigade
    - 2nd Battalion, Cameronians (Scottish Rifles)
    - 2nd Battalion, Royal Inniskilling Fusiliers
    - 2nd Battalion, Wiltshire Regiment
  - 15th Infantry Brigade
    - 1st Battalion, Green Howards
    - 1st Battalion, King's Own Yorkshire Light Infantry
    - 1st Battalion, York and Lancaster Regiment
  - 17th Infantry Brigade
    - 2nd Battalion, Royal Scots Fusiliers
    - 2nd Battalion, Northamptonshire Regiment
    - 6th Battalion, Seaforth Highlanders
  - 91st (4th London) Field Regiment, Royal Artillery
  - 92nd (5th London) Field Regiment, Royal Artillery
  - 156th (Lanarkshire Yeomanry) Field Regiment, Royal Artillery
  - 52nd (6th London) Anti-Tank Regiment, Royal Artillery
  - 18th Light Anti-Aircraft Regiment, Royal Artillery
  - 5th Reconnaissance Regiment, Reconnaissance Corps
  - 7th Battalion, Cheshire Regiment (machine gun battalion)
  - 5th Divisional Engineers
    - 38th Field Company, Royal Engineers
    - 245th Field Company, Royal Engineers
    - 252nd Field Company, Royal Engineers
    - 245th Field Park Company, Royal Engineers
- 50th (Northumbrian) Infantry Division
  Commanded by Major-General Sidney Kirkman.
  - 69th Infantry Brigade
    - 5th Battalion, East Yorkshire Regiment
    - 6th Battalion, Green Howards
    - 7th Battalion, Green Howards
  - 151st Infantry Brigade
    - 6th Battalion, Durham Light Infantry
    - 8th Battalion, Durham Light Infantry
    - 9th Battalion, Durham Light Infantry
  - 168th (2nd London) Brigade
    - 1st Battalion, London Irish Rifles
    - 1st Battalion, London Scottish
    - 10th Battalion, Royal Berkshire Regiment
  - 74th Field Regiment, Royal Artillery
  - 90th (City of London) Field Regiment, Royal Artillery
  - 124th Field Regiment, Royal Artillery
  - 102nd (Northumberland Hussars) Anti-Tank Regiment, Royal Artillery
  - 25th Light Anti-Aircraft Regiment, Royal Artillery
  - 2nd Battalion, Cheshire Regiment (machine gun battalion)
- 50th Divisional Engineers
    - 233rd (Northumbrian) Field Company, Royal Engineers
    - 501st (London) Field Company, Royal Engineers
    - 505th Field Company, Royal Engineers
    - 235th (Northumbrian) Field Park Company, Royal Engineers
- British 78th Infantry Division
  Commanded by Major-General Vyvyan Evelegh.
  - 11th Infantry Brigade
    - 2nd Battalion, Lancashire Fusiliers
    - 1st Battalion, East Surrey Regiment
    - 5th (Huntingdonshire) Battalion, Northamptonshire Regiment
  - 36th Infantry Brigade
    - 5th Battalion, Buffs (Royal East Kent Regiment)
    - 6th Battalion, Queen's Own Royal West Kent Regiment
    - 8th Battalion, Argyll and Sutherland Highlanders
  - 38th (Irish) Infantry Brigade
    - 6th Battalion, Royal Iniskilling Fusiliers
    - 1st Battalion, Royal Irish Fusiliers
    - 2nd Battalion, London Irish Rifles
  - 56th Reconnaissance Regiment, Reconnaissance Corps
  - 17th Field Regiment, Royal Artillery
  - 132nd (Welsh) Field Regiment, Royal Artillery
  - 138th (City of London) Field Regiment, Royal Artillery
  - 64th (Queen's Own Royal Glasgow Yeomanry) Anti-Tank Regiment, Royal Artillery
  - 49th Light Anti-Aircraft Regiment, Royal Artillery
  - 1st Battalion, Kensington Regiment (Princess Louise's) (machine gun)
  - 78th Divisional Engineers
    - 214th Field Company, Royal Engineers
    - 237th Field Company, Royal Engineers
    - 256th Field Company, Royal Engineers
    - 281st Field Park Company, Royal Engineers
- 1st Airborne Division
  Commanded by Major-General George F. Hopkinson. This unit did not participate as a division.
  - 1st Airlanding Brigade
    - 1st Battalion, Border Regiment
    - 2nd Battalion, South Staffordshire Regiment
    - 9th Field Company, Royal Engineers
  - 1st Parachute Brigade
    - 1st Battalion, Parachute Regiment
    - 2nd Battalion, Parachute Regiment
    - 3rd Battalion, Parachute Regiment
    - 16th (Parachute) Field Ambulance
    - 1st Airlanding Anti-Tank Battery, Royal Artillery
    - 1st (Airborne) Divisional Provost, Corps of Military Police
- British 4th Armoured Brigade
  - 3rd County of London Yeomanry (Sharpshooters)
  - 44th Royal Tank Regiment
  - A Squadron, 1st (Royal) Dragoons

===== British XXX Corps =====
XXX Corps was commanded by Lieutenant-General Sir Oliver Leese.

- 73rd Anti-Tank Regiment, Royal Artillery
- 5th Army Group Royal Artillery
  - 57th (Home Counties) Field Regiment, Royal Artillery
  - 58th (Sussex) Field Regiment, Royal Artillery
  - 78th (Lowland) Field Regiment, Royal Artillery
  - 7th Medium Regiment, Royal Artillery
  - 64th (London) Medium Regiment, Royal Artillery
  - 70th Medium Regiment, Royal Artillery
  - 11th Regiment, Royal Horse Artillery (Honourable Artillery Company)
  - 142nd (Royal Devon Yeomanry) Field Regiment, Royal Artillery
- 1st Canadian Infantry Division
  Commanded by Major-General Guy Simonds.
  - 1st Canadian Infantry Brigade
    - The Royal Canadian Regiment
    - 1st Battalion, The Hastings and Prince Edward Regiment
    - 1st Battalion, 48th Highlanders of Canada
  - 2nd Canadian Infantry Brigade
    - Princess Patricia's Canadian Light Infantry
    - 1st Battalion, The Seaforth Highlanders of Canada
    - 1st Battalion, The Loyal Edmonton Regiment
  - 3rd Canadian Infantry Brigade
    - Royal 22^{e} Régiment
    - 1st Battalion, The Carleton and York Regiment
    - 1st Battalion, The West Nova Scotia Regiment
  - 1st Field Regiment, Royal Canadian Horse Artillery
  - 2nd Field Regiment, Royal Canadian Artillery
  - 3rd Field Regiment, Royal Canadian Artillery
  - 1st Infantry Division Support Battalion (The Saskatoon Light Infantry)
  - 1st Anti-Tank Regiment, Royal Canadian Artillery
  - 2nd Light Anti-Aircraft Regiment, Royal Canadian Artillery
  - 4th Reconnaissance Regiment (4th Princess Louise Dragoon Guards)
  - No. 1 Defence and Employment Platoon (Lorne Scots)
  - 1st Field Company, Royal Canadian Engineers
  - 3rd Field Company, Royal Canadian Engineers
  - 4th Field Company, Royal Canadian Engineers
  - 2nd Field Park Company, Royal Canadian Engineers
- 1st Canadian Tank Brigade
  - 11th Army Tank Regiment (The Ontario Regiment (Tank))
  - 12th Army Tank Regiment (Three Rivers Regiment (Tank))
  - 14th Army Tank Regiment (The Calgary Regiment (Tank))
- British 51st (Highland) Infantry Division
  Commanded by Major-General Douglas Wimberley.
  - 152nd Infantry Brigade
    - 5th Battalion, Queen's Own Cameron Highlanders
    - 2nd Battalion, Seaforth Highlanders
    - 5th Battalion, Seaforth Highlanders
  - 153rd Infantry Brigade
    - 5th Battalion, Black Watch
    - 1st Battalion, Gordon Highlanders
    - 5/7th Battalion, Gordon Highlanders
  - 154th Infantry Brigade
    - 1st Battalion, Black Watch
    - 7th Battalion, Black Watch
    - 7th Battalion, Argyll and Sutherland Highlanders
  - 126th (Highland) Field Regiment, Royal Artillery
  - 127th (Highland) Field Regiment, Royal Artillery
  - 128th (Highland) Field Regiment, Royal Artillery
  - 61st (West Highland) Anti-Tank Regiment, Royal Artillery
  - 40th Light Anti-Aircraft Regiment, Royal Artillery
  - 1st/7th Battalion, Middlesex Regiment (machine gun battalion)
  - 7th Battalion, Royal Marines (under command 19 to 29 July)
  - 274th Field Company, Royal Engineers
  - 275th Field Company, Royal Engineers
  - 276th Field Company, Royal Engineers
  - 239th Field Park Company, Royal Engineers
- 23rd Armoured Brigade
  HQ 23rd Armoured Brigade HQ fought as Arrow Force in mid-July with 2nd Battalion, Seaforth Highlanders (from 152nd Brigade) under command together with elements of 50th RTR and 11th (HAC) Regiment, Royal Horse Artillery as well as an Anti-Tank battery and a machine gun company.
  - 50th Royal Tank Regiment
  - 46th (Liverpool Welsh) Royal Tank Regiment
  - 40th (The King's) Royal Tank Regiment
  - 11th (Queen's Westminsters) Battalion, Kings Royal Rifle Corps
- British 231st Infantry Brigade
  - 2nd Battalion, Devonshire Regiment
  - 1st Battalion, Dorsetshire Regiment
  - 1st Battalion, Hampshire Regiment
  - 165th Field Regiment, Royal Artillery
  - 300th Anti-Tank Battery, Royal Artillery
  - 352nd Light Anti-Aircraft Battery, Royal Artillery
  - 295th Field Company, Royal Engineers
  - 346th Company Royal Army Service Corps
  - 200th Field Ambulance, Royal Army Medical Corps

=== Allied Mediterranean Naval Command ===
The Naval forces were under the command of Admiral of the Fleet Sir Andrew Cunningham and was divided into several Task Forces.

==== Covering Force ====
The role of the covering force was to prevent the Italian Navy from attacking the invasion forces.

==== Eastern Naval Task Force ====
Eastern Naval task Force transported the Eastern Task Force (British Eighth Army) and provided Naval gunfire support.

==== Western Naval Task Force ====
The Western Naval Task Force transported the Western Task Force (Seventh U.S. Army) and provided Naval gunfire support.

- 8th U.S. Amphibious Force
  Command by Admiral Henry Kent Hewitt.
  - 80.2 Escort Group
    - Destroyer Squadron 7
      - USS Plunkett (DD-431), Destroyers Flag
      - DesDiv 13
        - USS Niblack (DD-424)
        - USS Benson (DD-421)
        - USS Gleaves (DD-423)
    - DesRon 8
      - USS Wainwright (DD-419), Flag
      - DesDiv 16
        - USS Mayrant (DD-402)
        - USS Trippe (DD-403)
        - USS Rhind (DD-404)
        - USS Rowan (DD-405)
  - Shark Force
    - Dime Force, Task Force 81, commanded by Rear Admiral John L. Hall Jr., USN
      The Dime Task Force landed the U. S. Army First Division (reinforced) and attached units near Gela, Sicily.
    - Cent Force, Task Force 85, commanded by Rear Admiral Alan G. Kirk, USN
      The Cent Task Force landed the U. S. Army Forty-fifth Division (reinforced) and attached units near Scoglitti, Sicily.
  - Joss Force, Task Force 86, commanded by Rear Admiral Richard L. Conolly, USN
    The Joss Task Force landed the U. S. Third Division (reinforced) and attached units near Licata, Sicily.
    - Task Force Organization
      - 86.1 Cover and Support Group, Rear Admiral Laurance T. DuBose, USN
        - Cruiser Division 13
        - Destroyer Squadron 13
        - Nine LCG(L) British - Landing Craft Gun (Large)
        - Eight LCF(L) British - Landing Craft, Flak (Large)
      - 86.2 Landing Craft Group, Commander L. S. Sabin, USN
        - LST Groups Two
        - LST Groups Three
        - LST Group Six
        - LST Division Seven (less LSTs 4 and 38)
        - LCI Flotilla Two
        - LCI Flotilla Four
        - LCT Group Thirty one
          Less LCTs 80, 207, 208, 214
          Plus LCTs 276, 305 311, 332
        - LCT 12 British LCTs
        - HMS Princess Astrid - Landing Ship, Infantry (Small)
        - HMS Prince Leopold - Landing Ship, Infantry (Small)
      - 86.3 Escort Group, Commander Block, USNR
        - USS Seer (AM-112)
        - USS Sentinel (AM-113)
        - 7 PCs
        - 26 SCs
        - 6 YMS - auxiliary motor minesweepers
      - 86.4 Joss Assault Force, Major General Truscott, USA
        - U. S. Army 3rd Division (reinforced) and attached units
      - 86.5 Train
        - USS Moreno (AT-87)
        - USS Intent
        - USS Evea (YT-458)
        - USS Resolute
      - 86.6 Force Flagship
        - USS Biscayne (AVP-11)
      - 86.9 Joint Loading Control, Captain Zimmerli, USN
  - Kool Force (Floating Reserve)

=== Allied Air Forces ===
At the time of Operation Husky, the Allied air forces - the Royal Air Force and United States Army Air Forces - in the North African and Mediterranean theatre were organized as the Mediterranean Air Command (MAC) under the command of Air Chief Marshal Sir Arthur Tedder (RAF). The major subdivisions of the MAC included the Northwest African Air Forces (NAAF) under the command of Lt. General Carl Spaatz (USAAF) with Air Vice Marshal James Robb as his deputy, the American 12th Air Force (also commanded by Gen. Spaatz), the American 9th Air Force under the command of Lt. General Lewis H. Brereton, and units of the British Royal Air Force (RAF).

Also supporting the NAAF were the RAF Middle East Command, Air Headquarters Malta, RAF Gibraltar, and the No. 216 (Transfer and Ferry) Group, which were subdivisions of MAC under the command of Tedder. He reported to the Supreme Allied Commander Dwight D. Eisenhower for the NAAF operations, but to the British Chiefs of Staff for RAF Command operations. Air Headquarters Malta, under the command of Air Vice-Marshal Sir Keith Park, also supported Operation Husky.

The "Desert Air Task Force" consisting of North American B-25 Mitchell medium bombers (the 12th and 340th Bombardment Groups) and Curtiss P-40 Warhawk fighters (the 57th, 79th, and 324th Fighter Groups) from the 9th Air Force served under the command of Air Marshal Sir Arthur Coningham of the Northwest African Tactical Air Force. These bomber and fighter groups moved to new airfields on Sicily as soon as a significant beachhead had been captured there.

In the MAC organization established at the Casablanca Conference in January 1943, the 9th Air Force was assigned as a subdivision of the RAF Middle East Command under the command of Air Chief Marshal Sir Sholto Douglas.

==== Mediterranean Air Command (Allied) ====
Air Chief Marshal Sir Arthur Tedder had his headquarters in Algiers, Algeria.

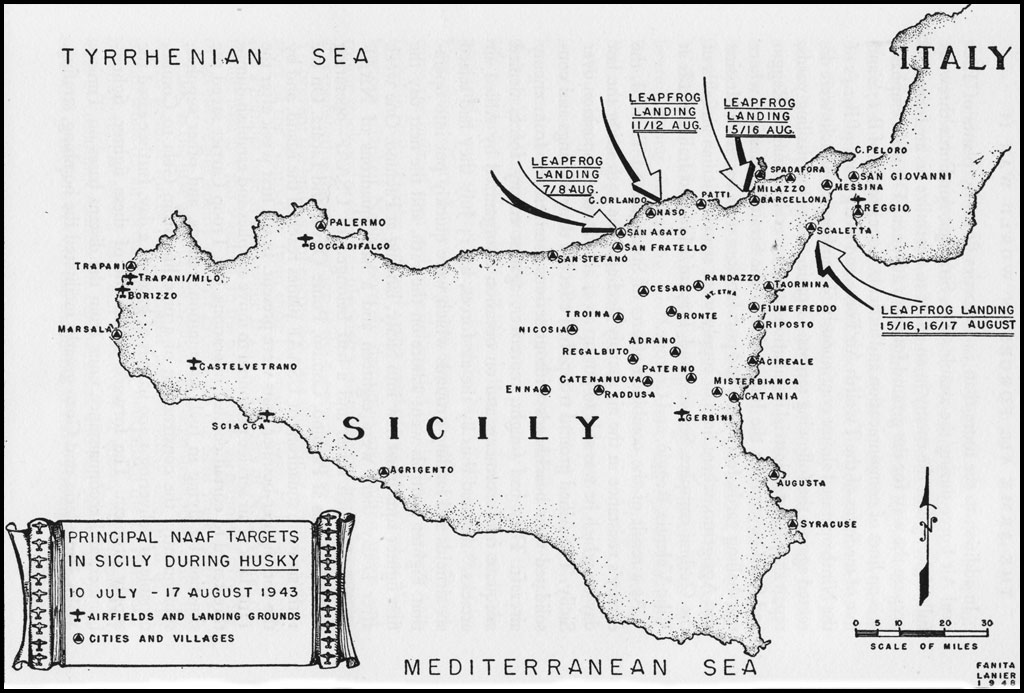
Principle Sicilian targets of the Northwest African Air Forces for Operation Husky.

===== Northwest African Air Forces =====
Lt. General Carl Spaatz had his headquarters for the Northwest African Air Forces in Maison-Carrée, Algeria

====== Northwest African Strategic Air Force ======
Maj. General James H. Doolittle, in command of the Northwest African Strategic Air Force, had his headquarters in Constantine, Algeria

- 5th Bombardment Wing (Heavy)

====== Northwest African Coastal Air Force ======
Air Vice-Marshal Sir Hugh Lloyd also had his headquarters in Algiers.

- No. 242 Group RAF (Air Commodore Kenneth Cross)
  - No. 323 Wing RAF
    - No. 73 Squadron, Supermarine Spitfire fighter planes
    - No. 255 Squadron, Bristol Beaufighters
    - No. II/5 Escadre (French Air Force), P-40 Warhawk fighters
    - No. II/7 Escadre (French Air Force), Spitfires
    - No. 283 Squadron, Supermarine Walrus air-sea rescue planes
    - No. 284 Squadron, Walrus air-sea rescue planes
  - No. 328 Wing RAF
    - No. 14 Squadron, Martin B-26 Marauder medium bombers
    - No. 39 Squadron, Bristol Beaufort torpedo bombers
    - No. 47 Squadron, Bristol Beauforts
    - No. 144 Squadron, Beaufighters
    - No. 52 Squadron, Martin Baltimore light bombers
    - No. 221 Squadron (Det.), Vickers Wellington medium bombers
    - No. 458 Squadron (RAAF), Wellington bombers

Source
British Units	American Units
RAF Units: No. 13 Squadron, Blenheim bombers; No. 614 Squadron, Blenheims; No. 36 Squadron, Wellington medium bombers; No. 253 Squadron, Hawker Hurricane fighters; No. 274 Squadron, Hurricanes; No. 313 Squadron, Hurricanes; No. 500 Squadron, Lockheed Hudson light bombers; No. 608 Squadron, Hudsons; No. 1575 (Special Duties) Flight, (Note: Activities in support of Special Operations Executive) Handley Page Halifax and Lockheed Ventura bombers	52nd Fighter Group; Lt. Colonel James Coward: 2nd Squadron, Spitfires; 4th Squadron, Spitfires; 5th Squadron, Spitfires; 414th Night Fighter Squadron, Bristol Beaufighters; 415th Night Fighter Squadron, Beaufighters
Royal Navy Fleet Air Arm Units; Torpedo Spotter Reconnaissance: 813 NAS (detached), Fairey Swordfish torpedo bombers; 820 NAS, Fairey Albacore c; 821 NAS, Albacore n; 826 NAS, Albacore r; 828 NAS, Albacore r	81st Fighter Group; Lt. Colonel Michael Gordon Oran, Algeria Sector: 92nd Squadron, Bell P-39 Airacobra fighters 1st Air Defense Wing: 91st Squadron, P-39 Airacobras; 93rd Squadron, P-39 Airacobras
Bone, Algeria Sector: No. 32 Squadron, Hawker Hurricanes; No. 87 Squadron, Hurricanes; No. 219 Squadron, Beaufighters	350th Fighter Group; Lt. Colonel Marvin McNickle: 345th Squadron, P-39 Airacobras; 346th Squadron, P-39 Airacobras; 347th Squadron, P-39 Airacobras
2nd Air Defense Wing: No. 153 Squadron, Beaufighters	480th Antisubmarine Group; Colonel Jack Roberts: 1st Squadron, B-24 Liberator patrol planes; 2nd Squadron, B-24 Liberators

Notes:

1. The 1st and 2nd Antisubmarine Squadrons were assigned to NACAF for administration and placed under the operational control of the U.S. Navy Fleet Air Wing 15 of the Moroccan Sea Frontier commanded by Rear Admiral (United States) Frank J. Lowry
2. Air Ministry was asked to provide two additional Wellington patrol squadrons. Asked? This is supposed to be an accurate historical document. Many things get asked for, but many less get provided.

====== Northwest African Tactical Air Force ======
Air Marshal Sir Arthur Coningham had his headquarters in Hammamet, Tunisia

- Desert Air Force
  Air Vice Marshal Harry Broadhurst
  - No. 7 Wing, South African Air Force
    - 2 Squadron SAAF, Spitfire fighters
    - 4 Squadron SAAF, Spitfires
    - 5 Squadron SAAF, P-40 Kittyhawk fighters
  - No. 239 (Fighter) Wing RAF, P-40 Kittyhawks
    - No. 3 Squadron RAAF
    - No. 112 Squadron RAF
    - No. 250 Squadron RAF
    - No. 260 Squadron RAF
    - No. 450 Squadron RAAF
  - No. 244 (Fighter) Wing RAF, Spitfires
    - 1 Squadron SAAF
    - No. 92 Squadron RCAF
    - No. 145 Squadron RAF
    - No. 417 Squadron RCAF
    - No. 601 (County of London) Squadron RAuxF
  - No. 322 (Fighter) Wing RAF, Colin Falkland Gray, Spitfires
    - No. 81 Squadron RAF
    - No. 152 (Hyderabad) Squadron RAF
    - No. 154 (Motor Industries) Squadron RAF
    - No. 232 Squadron RAF
    - No. 242 Squadron RAF
  - No. 324 Wing RAF, Spitfires
    - No. 43 Squadron RAF
    - No. 72 Squadron RAF
    - No. 93 Squadron RAF
    - No. 111 Squadron RAF
    - No. 243 Squadron RAF
  - 57th Fighter Group (USAAF)
    Colonel Arthur Salisbury
    - 64th Squadron, P-40 Warhawks
    - 65th Squadron, P-40 Warhawks
    - 66th Squadron, P-40 Warhawks
  - 79th Fighter Group (USAAF)
    Colonel Earl Bates
    - 85th Squadron, P-40 Warhawks
    - 86th Squadron, P-40 Warhawks
    - 87th Squadron, P-40 Warhawks
  - No. 285 (Reconnaissance) Wing RAF
    - 40 Squadron SAAF, Detached, Spitfires
    - 60 Squadron SAAF, Mosquito fighter-bombers
    - No. 1437 Flight RAF, P-51A Mustang fighters
  - No. 6 Squadron, Hurricane ground attack
- XII Air Support Command
  Maj. General Edwin House
  - 27th Fighter-Bomber Group (USAAF)
    Lt. Colonel John Stevenson
    - 522nd Squadron, A-36 Mustang ground attack aircraft
    - 523rd Squadron, A-36 Mustangs
    - 524th Squadron, A-36 Mustangs
  - 86th Fighter-Bomber Group (USAAF)
    Major Clinton True
    - 525th Squadron, A-36 Mustangs
    - 526th Squadron, A-36 Mustangs
    - 527th Squadron, A-36 Mustangs
  - 33d Fighter Group (USAAF)
    Colonel William W. Momyer
    - 58th Squadron, P-40 Warhawks
    - 59th Squadron, P-40 Warhawks
    - 60th Squadron, P-40 Warhawks
    - 99th Squadron, P-40, Detached
  - 324th Fighter Group (USAAF)
    Colonel William McNown
    - 314th Squadron, P-40 Warhawks
    - 315th Squadron, P-40 Warhawks
    - 316th Squadron, P-40 Warhawks
  - 31st Fighter Group (USAAF)
    Lt. Colonel Frank Hill
    - 307th Squadron, Spitfires
    - 308th Squadron, Spitfires
    - 309th Squadron, Spitfires
  - 111th Tactical Reconnaissance Squadron, P-51A Mustangs
- Tactical Bomber Force
  Air Commodore Laurence Sinclair
  - No. 3 Wing SAAF
    - 12 Squadron SAAF, Boston light bombers
    - 21 Squadron SAAF, Baltimore light bombers
    - 24 Squadron SAAF, Bostons
  - No. 232 (Light Bomber) Wing RAF
    - No. 55 Squadron RAF, Baltimores
    - No. 223 Squadron RAF, Baltimores
  - 33d Fighter Group (USAAF)
    Colonel William W. Momyer
    - 58th Squadron, P-40 Warhawks
    - 59th Squadron, P-40 Warhawks
    - 60th Squadron, P-40 Warhawks
    - 99th Squadron, P-40, Detached
  - No. 326 Wing RAF
    - No. 18 Squadron RAF, Bostons
    - No. 114 Squadron RAF, Bostons
  - 47th Bombardment Group (U.SA.A.F.)
    Colonel Malcolm Green, Jr.
    - 84th Squadron, A-20 Havoc
    - 85th Squadron, A-20 Havocs
    - 86th Squadron, A-20 Havocs
    - 97th Squadron, A-20 Havocs
  - 31st Fighter Group (U.S.A.A.F.)
    Lt. Colonel Frank Hill
    - 307th Squadron, Spitfires
    - 308th Squadron, Spitfires
    - 309th Squadron, Spitfires
  - 12th Bombardment Group (USAAF)
    Colonel Edward Backus
    - 81st Squadron, B-25 Mitchell medium bombers
    - 82nd Squadron, B-25 Mitchells
    - 83rd Squadron, B-25 Mitchells
    - 434th Squadron, B-25 Mitchells
  - 340th Bombardment Group (USAAF)
    Lt. Colonel Adolph Tokaz
    - 486th Squadron, B-25 Mitchells
    - 487th Squadron, B-25 Mitchells
    - 488th Squadron, B-25 Mitchells
    - 489th Squadron, B-25 Mitchells
  - No. 225 Squadron RAF, Spitfires
  - No. 241 Squadron RAF, Hurricanes

For Operation Husky, No. 242 Group, originally a component of NATAF in February 1943, was assigned to the Northwest African Coastal Air Force (NACAF). At the same time, Air Headquarters, Western Desert became known as the Desert Air Force. All of the fighter units of Desert Air Force formed No. 211 (Offensive Fighter) Group commanded by Air Commodore Richard Atcherley on April 11, 1943 in Tripoli. The 99th Fighter Squadron was assigned to the XII Air Support Command on May 28, 1943, and later made a part of the 33rd Fighter Group.

====== Northwest African Troop Carrier Command ======
United States Paul Williams, in Tunisia

51st Troop Carrier Wing Brig. General Ray Dunn	52nd Troop Carrier Wing Colonel Harold Clark	RAF Detachment
60th Troop Carrier Group; Lt. Colonel Frederick Sherwood 10th Squadron, C-47 Skytrains; 11th Squadron, C-47s; 12th Squadron, C-47s; 28th Squadron, C-47s	61st Troop Carrier Group; Colonel Willis Mitchell: 14th Squadron, C-47s; 15th Squadron, C-47s; 53rd Squadron, C-47s; 59th Squadron, C-47s	No. 38 Wing Air Commodore William Primrose: No. 295 Squadron RAF, Detached, Halifaxes; No. 296 Squadron RAF, Albemarles
62nd Troop Carrier Group; Lt. Colonel Aubrey Hurren 4th Squadron, C-47 Skytrains; 7th Squadron, C-47s; 8th Squadron, C-47s; 51st Squadron, C-47s	313th Troop Carrier Group; Colonel James Roberts, Jr. 29th Squadron, C-47s; 47th Squadron, C-47s; 48th Squadron, C-47s; 49th Squadron, C-47s	An Albemarle towing a Horsa glider.
64th Troop Carrier Group; Colonel John Cerny 16th Squadron, C-47 Skytrains; 17th Squadron, C-47s; 18th Squadron, C-47s; 35th Squadron, C-47s	314th Troop Carrier Group; Colonel Clayton Stiles 32nd Squadron, C-47s; 50th Squadron, C-47s; 61st Squadron, C-47s; 62nd Squadron, C-47s	
Information in table taken from: 1) Participation of the Ninth and Twelfth Air Forces in the Sicilian Campaign, Army Air Forces Historical Study No. 37; Army Air Forces Historical Office Headquarters, Maxwell Air Force Base, Alabama, 1945.	316th Troop Carrier Group; Colonel Jerome McCauley 36th Squadron, C-47 Skytrains; 44th Squadron, C-47s; 45th Squadron, C-47s	Information in table taken from: 2) Maurer, Maurer, Air Force; Combat Units Of World War II, Office of Air Force History, Maxwell AFB, Alabama, 1983.

To help carry out transport and supply operations for Operation Husky, in mid-1943 the American 315th Troop Carrier Group (34th & 43rd Squadrons) had been flown from England to Tunisia. There it was assigned to the Mediterranean Air Transport Service, and along with NATCC, this was a subdivision of the Mediterranean Air Command.

====== Northwest African Photographic Reconnaissance Wing ======
Colonel Elliott Roosevelt had his headquarters at La Marsa, Tunisia

- Northwest African Photographic Reconnaissance Wing
  - 3rd Photographic Group, Lt. Colonel Frank Dunn
    - 5th Combat Mapping Squadron, P-38 Lightnings
    - 12th Photographic Reconnaissance Squadron, P-38 Lightnings
    - 12th Weather Detachment
    - 15th Photographic Reconnaissance Squadron, B-17 Flying Fortresses
    - 13th Photographic Reconnaissance Squadron photo intelligence squadron
  - No. 60 Squadron SAAF Det., Mosquitos
  - No. 540 Squadron RAF Det., Mosquitos
  - No. 680 Squadron RAF, Spitfires
  - 2/33 Groupe (French), P-38 Lightnings (F-5 reconnaissance planes)

====== Northwest African Air Service Command ======
Brig. General Delmar had his headquarters in Dunton, Algiers.

====== Northwest African Training Command ======
Brig. General John K. Cannon,
U.S. APO 525

===== Air Headquarters Malta =====
Air Vice-Marshal Keith Park, the commander of Air Headquarters Malta, had his headquarters in Valletta, Malta

- No. 248 (Naval Co-operation) Wing
  - No. 69 Squadron RAF, Baltimores
  - No. 108 Squadron RAF, Beaufighters
  - No. 221 Squadron RAF, Wellington bombers
  - No. 272 Squadron RAF, Beaufighters
  - No. 683 Squadron RAF, Spitfires
- Spitfire fighter plane units
  - No. 40 Squadron SAAF of the South African Air Force
  - No. 126 Squadron RAF
  - No. 185 Squadron RAF
  - No. 229 Squadron RAF
  - No. 249 Squadron RAF
  - No. 1435 Flight RAF
- Other units
  - No. 23 Squadron RAF, counter-night-intruder operations with Mosquito fighter planes
  - No. 73 Squadron RAF Detachment (Det.), with Hurricane fighter planes
  - No. 256 Squadron RAF Det., with Mosquito night fighters
  - No. 600 Squadron RAF, Beaufighter night fighters
  - 815 Naval Air Squadron Det. (Fleet Air Arm), Fairey Albacores

===== No. 216 (Transport and Ferry) Group =====
Air Commodore Whitney Straight, Headquarters at Heliopolis, Egypt

- No. 17 Squadron SAAF, Junkers Ju 52
- No. 28 Squadron SAAF, Anson
- No. 117 Squadron RAF, Hudson
- No. 173 Squadron RAF, Lodestar, Proctor, Hurricane
- No. 216 Squadron RAF, Douglas Dakota
- No. 230 Squadron RAF, Short Sunderland
- No. 267 Squadron RAF, Hudson

===== RAF Gibraltar =====
Air Vice Marshal Sturley Simpson had his headquarters in Gibraltar

- No. 48 Squadron RAF, Hudsons
- No. 179 Squadron RAF, Wellingtons
- No. 202 Squadron RAF, Catalinas
- No. 210 Squadron RAF, Catalinas
- No. 233 Squadron RAF, Hudsons
- No. 248 Squadron RAF, Beaufighters
- No. 544 Squadron RAF, Spitfires
- 813 Naval Air Squadron (Fleet Air Arm), Swordfish torpedo planes
- No. 1403 (Meteorological) Flight Hampden, Gloster Gladiators

===== Middle East Command =====
Air Marshal Sir Sholto Douglas Headquarters at Cairo, Egypt

====== No. 201 (Naval Co-operation) Group ======
Air Vice Marshal Thomas Langsford-Sainsbury, Headquarters at Alexandria, Egypt

- No. 235 Wing
  - No. 13 Squadron (Royal Hellenic Air Force), Blenheim bombers
  - No. 227 Squadron RAF Det., Beaufighters
  - No. 454 Squadron RAAF, Baltimores
  - No. 459 Squadron RAAF, Hudsons
  - 815 Naval Air Squadron (FAA), Swordfish
- No. 238 Wing
  - No. 16 Squadron SAAF, Beauforts
  - No. 227 Squadron RAF Beaufighters
  - No. 603 Squadron RAF, Beaufighters
  - 815 Naval Air Squadron (FAA), Swordfish
- No. 245 Wing
  - No. 15 Squadron SAAF, Blenheims and Baltimores
  - No. 38 Squadron RAF, Wellingtons
  - No. 1 General Reconnaissance Unit, Wellingtons
- No. 247 Wing
  - No. 38 Squadron RAF, Wellingtons
  - No. 203 Squadron RAF, Baltimores
  - No. 227 Squadron RAF, Beaufighters
  - No. 252 Squadron RAF, Beaufighters

No Wing assignment: 701 Naval Air Squadron (FAA), Walrus Air-Sea Rescue

Note: RAF=Royal Air Force; RAAF=Royal Australian Air Force; SAAF=South African Air Force; FAA=Fleet Air Arm (Royal Navy); Det.= "detachment"

====== Air Headquarters Air Defences Eastern Mediterranean ======
Air Vice Marshal Richard Saul

No. 209 (Fighter) Group Group Captain R.C.F. Lister	No. 210 (Fighter) Group Group Captain John Grandy	No. 212 (Fighter) Group Air Commodore Archibald Wann	No. 219 (Fighter) Group Group Captain Max Aitken
No. 46 Squadron RAF Det., Beaufighters	No. 3 Squadron SAAF, Hurricanes	No. 7 Squadron SAAF, Hurricanes	No. 46 Squadron RAF, Beaufighters
No. 127 Squadron RAF, Hurricanes and Spitfires	No. 33 Squadron RAF, Hurricanes	No. 41 Squadron SAAF, Hurricanes	No. 74 Squadron RAF, Hurricanes
	No. 89 Squadron RAF, Beaufighters	No. 80 Squadron RAF, Spitfires	No. 238 Squadron RAF, Hurricanes
	No. 213 Squadron RAF, Hurricanes	No. 94 Squadron RAF, Hurricanes	No. 335 Squadron RAF, Hurricanes
	No. 274 Squadron RAF, Hurricanes	No. 108 Squadron RAF Det., Beaufighters	No. 336 Squadron RAF, Hurricanes
		No. 123 Squadron RAF, Hurricanes	No. 451 Squadron RAAF, Hurricanes
		No. 134 Squadron RAF, Hurricanes	
		No. 237 Squadron RAF, Hurricanes	
		No. 1563 Met. Flight, Gloster Gladiators	
		No. 1654 Met. Flight, Gladiators	

Notes:
SAAF=South African Air Force; RAAF=Royal Australian Air Forces; Det.=Detached; Met.=Meteorological.

====== U.S. 9th Air Force ======
Major General Lewis H. Brereton had his headquarters in Cairo, Egypt

- IX Advanced Headquarters in Tripoli, Libya
- IX Fighter Command Headquarters in Tripoli
- IX Bomber Command Headquarters at Benghazi, Libya
  - 98th Bombardment Group, B-24D Liberator II
    - 343rd Squadron, Lete Airfield, Libya
    - 344th Squadron, Lete Airfield
    - 345th Squadron, Benina Airfield
    - 415th Squadron, Benina Airfield
  - 376th Bombardment Group, B-24D Liberator II, Berka, Libya
    - 512th Squadron
    - 513th Squadron
    - 514th Squadron
    - 515th Squadron

== Axis Forces ==
Comando Supremo
Chief of the General Staff: General Vittorio Ambrosio

Oberbefehlshaber Süd
Commander-in-Chief: General Albert Kesselring

=== Armed Forces Command Sicily ===
The Armed Forces Command Sicily based in Enna under Generale d'Armata Alfredo Guzzoni had command of all Axis forces on Sicily. (Note: On 17 July Guzzoni delegated tactical command to Hube of any areas containing German troops. On 30 July Guzzoni gave Hube command of the whole front)

==== Italian 6th Army ====
The Royal Italian Army's 6th Army co-located with Armed Forces Command Sicily in Enna and also commanded by Generale d'Armata Alfredo Guzzoni had command of all Royal Italian Army and German Army units on Sicily.
The German Army Liaison Officer was Generalleutnant Fridolin von Senger und Etterlin

- 6th Army, in Enna - Generale d'Armata Alfredo Guzzoni; Chief of Staff Generale di Brigata Emilio Faldella
  - 10th Anti-tank Artillery Grouping, in Agrigento
    - CLXI Anti-tank Group, in San Michele di Ganzaria (90/53 self-propelled guns)
    - CLXII Anti-tank Group, in Borgesati (90/53 self-propelled guns)
    - CLXIII Anti-tank Group, in Paternò (90/53 self-propelled guns)
  - 131st Tank Infantry Regiment (commands Mobile Group "H")
    - XII Tank Battalion "L" (detached to Mobile Group "A")
      - 1st Tank Company (Fiat 3000 tanks; detached to XII Army Corps for static airfield defense)
      - 2nd Tank Company (Fiat 3000 tanks; detached to Mobile Group "H")
    - CI Tank Battalion (R35 tanks); detached mobile groups D, E, and F)
    - CII Tank Battalion (R35 tanks; detached to mobile groups A, B, and C)
    - IV Self-propelled Anti-tank Battalion (47/32 L40 self-propelled guns; detached to 4th Infantry Division "Livorno")
    - CXXXIII Self-propelled Anti-tank Battalion (47/32 L40 self-propelled guns; detached to mobile groups A, B, and C)
    - CCXXXIII Self-propelled Anti-tank Battalion (47/32 L40 self-propelled guns; detached to XII Army Corps)
  - II Battalion/ 10th Arditi Regiment
  - DV Self-propelled Anti-aircraft Artillery Group (90/53 anti-aircraft guns mounted on Breda 51 trucks)
  - 2x Bersaglieri motorcyclist companies
  - 2x Anti-aircraft artillery batteries (20/65 anti-aircraft guns)
  - 1x Anti-aircraft artillery battery (75/46 anti-aircraft guns)
  - 19th Mining Engineers Company
  - Army Services

The 6th Army fielded more than 100 Anti-paratrooper units of about 30 men each. These units, with the oldest available local reservists, were tasked with searching for allied personnel - paratroopers and pilots - which had parachuted into Sicily behind the frontline.

===== Italian XII Army Corps =====
- XII Army Corps, in Corleone - Generale di Corpo d'Armata Mario Arisio, from 12 July: Generale di Corpo d'Armata Francesco Zingales - responsible for Sicily to the West of a line from Cefalù to Licata
  - 12th Army Corps Artillery Grouping
    - XIX Motorized Artillery Group (105/28 howitzers)
    - XXI Motorized Artillery Group (105/28 howitzers)
    - XXII Motorized Artillery Group (105/28 howitzers)
    - XLVIII Motorized Artillery Group (105/28 howitzers)
    - CXXI Motorized Artillery Group (149/13 howitzers)
    - CXXII Motorized Artillery Group (149/13 howitzers)
    - 76th Anti-aircraft Artillery Battery (20/65 anti-aircraft guns)
    - 78th Anti-aircraft Artillery Battery (20/65 anti-aircraft guns)
  - VII Anti-aircraft Artillery Group (75/46 anti-aircraft guns)
  - CIV Anti-tank Battalion, in Agrigento (47/32 anti-tank guns) (detached to 177th Mobile Territorial Bersaglieri Regiment)
  - CX Motorized Artillery Group (75/27 field guns; 2nd Battery detached to Mobile Group "A")
  - CLI Coastal Artillery Group (149/19 heavy guns, reinforcements from the Italian mainland)
  - CCXXXIII Motorized Artillery Group (75/27 field guns; detached to 26th Infantry Division "Assietta")
  - I Bersaglieri Anti-tank Battalion, in Corleone (47/32 anti-tank guns)
  - 1x Engineer battalion
  - 2x Bersaglieri motorcyclist companies
  - Army Corps Services

====== Coastal Troops Command ======
- Coastal Troops Command - Generale di Divisione Giovanni Marciani
  - 136th (Autonomous) Coastal Regiment - responsible for the coast from the East of Palermo to including Cefalù
    - CIII Coastal Battalion
    - CDLXV Coastal Battalion
  - 202nd Coastal Division - Generale di Brigata Gino Ficalbi - responsible for the coast from Mazara del Vallo to Sciacca
    - 124th Coastal Regiment
      - CCCLXXVI Coastal Battalion
      - CCCLXXXVI Coastal Battalion
      - DXLIII Coastal Battalion
    - 142nd Coastal Regiment
      - CCCLXXVII Coastal Battalion
      - CDXXVII Coastal Battalion
      - CDLXVI Coastal Battalion
      - CDXC Coastal Battalion
    - 62nd Coastal Artillery Grouping
      - LVI Cannons Group (105/32 field guns)
      - LXXVI Coastal Artillery Group (149/35 heavy guns)
      - CLXXI Coastal Artillery Group (105/28 howitzers)
      - CLXXII Coastal Artillery Group (105/28 howitzers)
    - 63rd Coastal Artillery Grouping
      - LV Cannons Group (105/32 field guns)
      - CXLI Coastal Artillery Group (75/27 field guns)
      - CXLIII Coastal Artillery Group (149/35 howitzers))
      - CLVII Coastal Artillery Group (149/19 howitzers)
    - CCCIII Coastal Battalion
    - CIX Static Machine Gun Battalion
    - 151st Bersaglieri Motorcyclists Company
    - 102nd Mortar Company (81mm Mod. 35 mortars)
    - Division Services
  - 207th Coastal Division, in Agrigento - Generale di Brigata Ottorino Schreiber, later Generale di Brigata Augusto De Laurentiis - responsible for the coast from Sciacca to Punta Due Rocche to the East of Licata
    - 138th Coastal Regiment
      - CCCLXXX Coastal Battalion
      - CCCLXXXVIII Coastal Battalion
      - CDXX Coastal Battalion
    - 139th Coastal Regiment, in Licata
      - CDXIX Coastal Battalion
      - CCCXC Coastal Battalion
      - DXXXVIII Coastal Battalion
    - 177th Mobile Territorial Bersaglieri Regiment (attached)
      - DXXV Bersaglieri Battalion
      - DXXVI Bersaglieri Battalion
      - DXXVII Bersaglieri Battalion
      - CIV Anti-tank Battalion (47/32 anti-tank guns; detached from 12th Army Corps Artillery Grouping)
      - 1st Motorized Machine Gun Company (attached)
    - 12th Coastal Artillery Grouping
      - XXXV Coastal Artillery Group (3x 105/28 and 1x 75/27 batteries)
      - CXLV Coastal Artillery Group (2x 105/28 and 1x 75/34 batteries)
      - CLX Coastal Artillery Group (2x 149/35 and 1x 105mm/27 batteries)
      - CCXXII Coastal Artillery Group (2x 100/22 batteries)
    - CIV Coastal Battalion
    - CV Static Machine Gun Battalion
    - 103rd Mortar Company (81mm Mod. 35 mortars)
    - Division Services
  - 208th Coastal Division - Generale di Divisione Giovanni Marciani (nominal) - Colonel Dal Monte (effective) - responsible for the coast from Palermo to Trapani
    - 133rd Coastal Regiment
      - CCXLIV Coastal Battalion
      - CDXXIII Coastal Battalion
      - CDXCVIII Coastal Battalion
    - 147th Coastal Regiment
      - CCCLXXVIII Coastal Battalion
      - CDXXXVIII Coastal Battalion
      - DXXXIX Coastal Battalion
    - 28th Coastal Artillery Grouping
      - CXXIV Coastal Artillery Group (105/14 howitzers
      - CCXV Coastal Artillery Group (100/17 howitzers)
    - CXII Machine Gun Battalion
    - 164th Anti-tank Company (47/32 anti-tank guns)
    - 101st Mortar Company (81mm Mod. 35 mortars)
    - 517th Mortar Company (81mm Mod. 35 mortars)
    - Division Services
  - 230th Coastal Division - Generale di Divisione Egisto Conti - responsible for the coast from the South of Trapani to Mazara del Vallo (division raised on 1 June 1943 from personnel of the 8th Marching Division and arrived in Sicily on 3 July 1943, augmented with units of the 202nd Coastal Division)
    - 120th Coastal Regiment
      - CCXLV Coastal Battalion
      - DCCCLVII Coastal Battalion
      - DCCCLXXX Coastal Battalion
    - 184th Coastal Regiment
      - CCCLXXXVII Coastal Battalion
      - CDXCVII Coastal Battalion
    - 43rd Coastal Artillery Grouping
      - VII Coastal Artillery Group (1x 149/35 and 1x 155/36 batteries)
      - XX Coastal Artillery Group (1x 149/35 and 1x 155/36 batteries)
      - XXII Coastal Artillery Group (105/28 howitzers)
      - CCXVIII Coastal Artillery Group (100/22 howitzers)
    - 712th Machine Gun Company
    - Division Services
  - XXIX Coastal Brigade - Harbor Defense Command "N", in Palermo - Generale di Divisione Giuseppe Molinero
    - CCCIV Coastal Battalion
    - CCCXLIV Coastal Battalion
    - CDLXXVI Coastal Battalion
    - XXX Coastal Group "Cavalleggeri di Palermo"
    - I Group/ 25th Artillery Regiment "Assietta"/ 26th Infantry Division "Assietta" (100/17 howitzers)
    - XLI Coastal Artillery Group
      - 121st Battery, at Punta la Barbara (2x 152/45 cannons)
      - 122nd Battery, at Aspra (2x 152/45 cannons)
      - 2x batteries (1x with 75/27 field guns, 1x with 105/28 howitzers)
    - 51st Heavy Artillery Battery

====== Tactical Groups ======
Tactical groups were created from corps assets and detached units of the army corps's two infantry divisions. The groups were deployed near the beaches most likely to be used by the allies.

- Tactical Group "Chiusa Sclafani", in Chiusa Sclafani
  - 10th Bersaglieri Regiment
    - XXXV Bersaglieri Battalion
    - LXXIII Bersaglieri Battalion
    - LXXIV Bersaglieri Battalion
  - CIII Motorized Artillery Group (75/27 field guns)
  - 4th Self-propelled Company (75/18 self-propelled guns)
  - 10th Armored Car Squadron (AB 41 armored cars)
- Tactical Group "Alcamo-Partinico", in the area of Alcamo and Partinico
  - 171st CC.NN. Legion "Vespri"/ 28th Infantry Division "Aosta"
    - CLXVIII CC.NN. Battalion
    - CLXXI CC.NN. Battalion
    - 171st CC.NN. Machine Gun Company
  - I Group/ 22nd Artillery Regiment "Aosta" (75/27 field guns)
- Tactical Group "Inchiapparo-Casale", in the area of Inchiapparo and Casale
  - LI Bersaglieri Battalion
  - 82nd Anti-tank Battery (75/39 anti-tank guns)
- Tactical Group "Campobello-Ravanusa", in the area of Campobello di Licata and Ravanusa
  - I Squadrons Group "Cavalleggeri di Palermo"
  - XVII CC.NN. Battalion/ 17th CC.NN. Legion "Cremona"/ 26th Infantry Division "Assietta"
  - 259th Machine Gun Company/ 17th CC.NN. Legion "Cremona"/ 26th Infantry Division "Assietta"

====== Mobile Groups ======
Mobile groups were fully motorized battle groups created from corps assets and detached units of the army corps's two infantry divisions. The groups were deployed near the beaches most likely to be used by the allies.

- Mobile Group "A", in Paceco - Lieutenant Colonel Renato Perrone
  - Headquarters Company/ XII Tank Battalion "L"
  - 1st Company/ CXXXIII Self-propelled Anti-tank Battalion (47/32 L40 self-propelled guns)
  - 4th Company/ CII Tank Battalion (R35 tanks)
  - 3rd Company/ CDXLVIII Motorized Coastal Battalion
  - 2nd Battery/ CX Motorized Artillery Group (75/27 field guns)
  - 2nd Section/ 328th Anti-aircraft Battery/ 22nd Artillery Regiment "Aosta" (20/65 anti-aircraft guns)
- Mobile Group "B", in Santa Ninfa - Lieutenant Colonel Vito Gaetano Mascio
  - Headquarters Company/ CXXXIII Self-propelled Anti-tank Battalion
  - 3rd Company/ CXXXIII Self-propelled Anti-tank Battalion (47/32 self-propelled guns)
  - 6th Company/ CII Tank Battalion (R35 tanks)
  - 1st and 2nd companies/ CDXLVIII Motorized Coastal Battalion
  - 161st Bersaglieri Motorcyclists Company
  - 6th Battery/ CCXXXIII Motorized Artillery Group (75/27 field guns)
  - 2nd Section/ 10th Anti-aircraft Battery/ 25th Artillery Regiment "Assietta" (20/65 anti-aircraft guns)
- Mobile Group "C", in Portella Misilbesi - Lieutenant Colonel Osvaldo Mazzei
  - Headquarters Company/ CII Tank Battalion
  - 2nd Company/ CXXXIII Self-propelled Anti-tank Battalion (47/32 self-propelled guns)
  - 5th Company/ CII Tank Battalion (R35 tanks)
  - 4th Company/ CDXLVIII Motorized Coastal Battalion
  - 104th Anti-tank company (47/32 anti-tank guns)
  - 10th Battery/ IV Group/ 25th Artillery Regiment "Assietta" (75/27 field guns)
  - 4th Section/ 326th Anti-aircraft Battery/ 25th Artillery Regiment "Assietta" (20/65 anti-aircraft guns)

====== XII Army Corps Reserve ======
The 26th Infantry Division "Assietta" had been transferred from its bases and recruiting area in eastern Piedmont to Sicily in August 1941. The division's pre-deployment headquarters were in Asti, while's its two infantry regiments had been based in Asti (29th) and Tortona (30th), with the division's artillery regiment also based at Asti.

- 26th Infantry Division "Assietta" - Generale di Divisione Francesco Scotti, from 26 July: Generale di Brigata Ottorino Schreiber
  - 29th Infantry Regiment "Assietta"
    - 3x Fusilier battalions
    - Support Weapons Company (65/17 infantry support guns)
    - Mortar Company (81mm Mod. 35 mortars)
  - 30th Infantry Regiment "Assietta"
    - 3x Fusilier battalions
    - Support Weapons Company (65/17 infantry support guns)
    - Mortar Company (81mm Mod. 35 mortars)
  - 17th CC.NN. Legion "Cremona"
    - XVII CC.NN. Battalion (detached to Tactical Group "Campobello-Ravanusa")
    - XVIII CC.NN. Battalion
    - 259th CC.NN. Machine Gun Company (detached to Tactical Group "Campobello-Ravanusa")
  - 25th Artillery Regiment "Assietta"
    - I Artillery Group (100/17 howitzers; detached to XXIX Coastal Brigade)
    - II Artillery Group (100/17 howitzers)
    - III Artillery Group (75/27 field guns)
    - IV Artillery Group (75/27 field guns; 10th Battery detached to Mobile Group "C")
    - 10th Anti-aircraft Battery (20/65 anti-aircraft guns; 2nd Section detached to Mobile Group "B")
    - 326th Anti-aircraft Battery (20/65 anti-aircraft guns; 4th Sections detached to Mobile Group "C")
  - XXVI Mortar Battalion (81mm Mod. 35 mortars)
  - CXXVI Machine Gun Battalion
  - CCXXXIII Motorized Artillery Group (75/27 field guns; 6th Battery detached to Mobile Group "C")
  - Mixed Engineer Battalion
  - 50th Bersaglieri Motorcyclists Company (attached)
  - 126th Anti-tank Company (47/32 anti-tank guns)
  - Division Services

The 28th Infantry Division "Aosta" was one of three divisions, which recruited in Sicily. It mainly drafted men from western Sicily and had its peacetime headquarters in Palermo. It's two infantry regiments were based in Trapani (5th) and Palermo (6th), where also the division's artillery regiment was based.

- 28th Infantry Division "Aosta" - Generale di Divisione Giuseppe Romano
  - 5th Infantry Regiment "Aosta"
    - 3x Fusilier battalions
    - Support Weapons Company (65/17 infantry support guns)
    - Mortar Company (81mm Mod. 35 mortars)
  - 6th Infantry Regiment "Aosta"
    - 3x Fusilier battalions
    - Support Weapons Company (65/17 infantry support guns)
    - Mortar Company (81mm Mod. 35 mortars)
  - 171st CC.NN. Legion "Vespri" (detached as Tactical Group "Alcamo-Partinico")
    - CLXVIII CC.NN. Battalion
    - CLXXI CC.NN. Battalion
    - 171st CC.NN. Machine Gun Company
  - 22nd Artillery Regiment "Aosta"
    - I Artillery Group (75/27 field guns; detached to Tactical Group "Alcamo-Partinico")
    - II Artillery Group (75/27 howitzers)
    - III Motorized Group (75/18 Mod. 35 field guns)
    - IV Artillery Group (75/13 mountain guns)
    - 328th Anti-aircraft Battery (20/65 anti-aircraft guns; 2nd Section detached to Mobile Group "A")
    - 365th Anti-aircraft Battery (20/65 anti-aircraft guns)
  - XXVIII Mortar Battalion (81mm Mod. 35 mortars)
  - CXXVIII Mixed Engineer Battalion
  - 28th Anti-tank Company (47/32 anti-tank guns)
  - Division Services

===== Italian XVI Army Corps =====
- XVI Army Corps, in Piazza Armerina - Generale di Corpo d'Armata Carlo Rossi - responsible for Sicily to the East of a line from Cefalù to Gela
  - 40th Army Corps Artillery Grouping, in Piazza Armerina
    - X Motorized Artillery Group (105/28 howitzers)
    - XVI Motorized Artillery Group (105/28 howitzers)
    - XXIX Motorized Artillery Group (105/28 howitzers)
    - CIX Motorized Artillery Group (149/13 howitzers)
    - CX Heavy Artillery Group (149/13 howitzers)
  - 16th Army Corps Engineer Grouping
  - LVIII Bersaglieri Battalion
  - XII Army Corps Machine Gun Battalion
  - CCXXXIII Self-propelled Anti-tank Battalion (47/32 L40 self-propelled guns)
  - XI Anti-aircraft Artillery Group (75/46 anti-aircraft guns)
  - 1x Engineer battalion
  - Army Corps Services

====== Coastal Troops Command ======
- Coastal Troops Command - Generale di Divisione Achille d'Havet
  - 206th Coastal Division, in Modica - Generale di Divisione Achille d'Havet - responsible for the coast from Punta Braccetto in Santa Croce Camerina to Arenella to the South of Syracuse
    - 122nd Coastal Regiment
      - CCXLIII Coastal Battalion
      - CCCLXXV Coastal Battalion
    - 123rd Coastal Regiment
      - CCCLXXXI Coastal Battalion
      - CCCLXXXIII Coastal Battalion
      - DXLII Coastal Battalion
    - 146th Coastal Regiment
      - CCCLXXIV Coastal Battalion
      - CDXXX Coastal Battalion
      - CDXXXVII Coastal Battalion
    - 44th Coastal Artillery Grouping
      - CII Coastal Artillery Group (75/27 field guns)
      - CLXI Coastal Artillery Group (149/35 heavy guns)
      - CLXIV Coastal Artillery Group (149/35 heavy guns)
      - CCIX Coastal Artillery Group (100/22 howitzers)
      - CCXXIV Coastal Artillery Group (100/22 howitzers)
      - 227th Coastal Artillery Battery (105/14 howitzers)
    - DXLII Mobile Territorial Bersaglieri Battalion (attached, 2nd Company detached to Mobile Group "F")
    - CIV Static Machine Gun Battalion
    - CCXX Self-propelled Anti-tank Battalion (attached; 47/32 L40 self-propelled guns)
    - 122nd Engineer Platoon
    - 2x Anti-paratrooper units
    - Division Services
  - 213th Coastal Division, Generale di Brigata Carlo Gotti - responsible for the coast from Punta Castelluccio in Agnone Bagni to Moleti south of Messina
    - 135th Coastal Regiment
      - XII Coastal Battalion
      - CII Coastal Battalion
      - CCCLXIX Coastal Battalion
    - CCCLXXII Coastal Battalion
    - 21st Coastal Artillery Grouping
      - XXX Coastal Artillery Group (105/28 howitzers)
      - XC Coastal Artillery Group (2x 149/19 and 2x 149/35 heavy gun batteries)
      - CXLIV Coastal Artillery Group (105/14 howitzers)
      - CCXXX Coastal Artillery Group (100/22 howitzers)
    - CLIII Static Machine Gun Battalion
    - Division Services
  - XVIII Coastal Brigade, in Niscemi to Gela Generale di Brigata Orazio Mariscalco - responsible for the coast from Punta Due Rocche to the East of Licata to Punta Braccetto in Santa Croce Camerina
    - 134th Coastal Regiment
      - CDXXIX Coastal Battalion
      - CCCLXXXIV Coastal Battalion
    - 178th Coastal Regiment
      - DI Coastal Battalion (4th Company detached to Mobile Group "E")
      - CCCLXXXIX Coastal Battalion
    - 60th Coastal Artillery Grouping
      - XXI Coastal Artillery Group (2x 75/27 field gun and 2x 75/34 anti-tank gun batteries)
      - LXXXI Coastal Artillery Group (75/32 field guns)
      - CLXII Coastal Artillery Group (149/35 heavy guns)
      - CCIX Coastal Artillery Group (100/22 howitzers)
    - 81st Artillery Battery (75/34 anti-tank guns)
    - 106th Mortar Company (81mm Mod. 35 mortars)
    - 426th Mortar Company (81mm Mod. 35 mortars)
    - 268th Anti-tank Company (47/32 anti-tank guns)
    - 288th Artillery Battery (155/36 guns)
    - 455th, 456th, 526th, and 332nd Anti-paratrooper units
    - Brigade Services
  - XIX Coastal Brigade, Generale di Brigata Giovanni Bocchetti - responsible for the coast from the West of Messina to, but excluding, Cefalù
    - 140th Coastal Regiment
      - CI Coastal Battalion
      - CDXLVII Coastal Battalion
    - 179th Coastal Regiment
      - CDXXXV Coastal Battalion
      - D Coastal Battalion
    - 61st Coastal Artillery Grouping
      - Coastal Artillery Group (4x batteries of 75/27 field guns)
      - Coastal Artillery Group (4x batteries of 122/45 howitzers)
      - 128th Coastal Artillery Battery (105/28 howitzers)
    - XV Anti-tank battalion (attached; 47/32 anti-tank guns)
    - 52nd Bersaglieri Motorcyclists Company (attached)
    - 104th Mortar Company (81mm Mod. 35 mortars)
    - 413th Static Mortar Company (81mm Mod. 35 mortars)
    - Brigade Services
  - Harbor Defense Command "H", in Catania - Generale di Brigata Azzo Passalacqua
    - CDXXXIV Coastal Battalion
    - CDLXXVII Coastal Battalion
    - XXVI Coastal Artillery Group (75/27 field guns)
    - 105th Mortar Company (81mm Mod. 35 mortars)

====== Tactical Groups ======
Tactical groups were created from corps assets and detached units of the army corps's two infantry divisions. The groups were deployed near the beaches most likely to be used by the allies.

- Tactical Group "Barcellona", in Barcellona Pozzo di Gotto
  - Headquarters Company/ CIII Anti-tank Battalion
  - 2nd Company/ CIII Anti-tank Battalion (47/32 anti-tank guns)
  - 7th Bersaglieri Motorcyclists Company
  - 12th Battery/ IV Group/ 54th Artillery Regiment "Napoli" (75/18 field guns)
  - Arditi Platoon/ CDXLVII Coastal Battalion
- Tactical Group "Carmito", in Carmito
  - IV Self-propelled Anti-tank Battalion/ 4th Infantry Division "Livorno" (47/32 L40 self-propelled guns)
  - 53rd Bersaglieri Motorcyclists Company
- Tactical Group "Comiso-Ispica", in the area of Comiso and Ispica - Colonel Busalacchi
  - CLXXIII CC.NN. Battalion
  - I Group/ 54th Artillery Regiment "Napoli" (100/17 howitzers)
  - 174th CC.NN. Machine Gun Company
  - 2nd Company/ LIV Mortar Battalion/ 54th Infantry Division "Napoli" (81mm Mod. 35 mortars)
  - 1x Anti-Tank platoon (47mm/32)
- Tactical Group "Linguaglossa", in Linguaglossa
  - LVII Bersaglieri Battalion
  - 54th Bersaglieri Motorcyclists Company
  - 11th Battery/ IV Group/ 54th Artillery Regiment "Napoli" (75/18 Mod. 35 field guns)

====== Mobile Groups ======
Mobile groups were fully motorized battle groups created from corps assets and detached units of the army corps's two infantry divisions. The groups were deployed near the beaches most likely to be used by the allies.

- Mobile Group "D", in Misterbianco - Lieutenant Colonel Massimino D'Andretta
  - Headquarters Company/ CI Tank Battalion
  - 3rd Company/ CI Tank Battalion (R35 tanks)
  - 2nd Bersaglieri Motorcyclists Company
  - 7th Company/ II Fusilier Battalion/ 76th Infantry Regiment "Napoli"
  - 1st Company/ CIII Anti-tank Battalion (47/32 anti-tank guns)
  - 10th Battery/ IV Group/ 54th Artillery Regiment "Napoli" (75/18 Mod. 35 field guns)
  - 1st Section/ 354th Anti-aircraft Battery/ 54th Infantry Division "Napoli" (20/65 anti-aircraft guns)
- Mobile Group "E", in Niscemi - Captain Giuseppe Granieri (destroyed in the Battle of Gela)
  - 1st Company/ CI Tank Battalion (R35 tanks)
  - 2nd Company/ CII Anti-tank Battalion (47/32 anti-tank guns)
  - 155th Bersaglieri Motorcyclists Company
  - 4th Company/ DI Coastal Battalion/ XVIII Coastal Brigade
  - 9th Battery/ III Group/ 54th Artillery Regiment "Napoli" (75/18 field guns)
  - 1st Section/ 21st Anti-aircraft Battery/ 54th Infantry Division "Napoli" (20/65 anti-aircraft guns)
- Mobile Group "F", in Rosolini
  - Headquarters Company/ CII Anti-tank Battalion
  - 2nd Company/ CI Tank Battalion (R35 tanks, 1x platoon detached to Mobile Group "G")
  - 3rd Bersaglieri Motorcyclists Company
  - 2nd Company/ DXLII Mobile Territorial Bersaglieri Battalion
  - 1st Company/ CII Anti-tank Battalion (47/32 anti-tank guns)
  - 2nd Battery/ CXXVI Motorized Artillery Group (75/27 field guns)
- Mobile Group "G", in Comiso - Lieutenant Colonel Porcù
  - CLXIX CC.NN. Battalion/ 173rd CC.NN. Legion "Salso"/ 54th Infantry Division "Napoli"
  - 3rd Company/ CII Anti-tank Battalion (47/32 anti-tank guns)
  - 8th Battery/ III Group/ 54th Artillery Regiment "Napoli" (75/18 field guns)
  - 1x Platoon/ 2nd Company/ CI Tank Battalion (R35 tanks)
- Mobile Group "H", in Caltagirone - Lieutenant Colonel Luigi Cixi
  - Headquarters Company/ 131st Tank Infantry Regiment
  - 2nd Tank Company (9x Fiat 3000 tanks)
  - 3rd Company/ CIII Anti-tank Battalion (47/32 anti-tank guns)
  - 7th Battery/ III Group/ 54th Artillery Regiment "Napoli" (75/18 field guns)
  - 1x Platoon/ Mortar Company/ 76th Infantry Regiment "Napoli" (81mm Mod. 35 mortars)

====== XVI Army Corps Reserve ======
The 4th Infantry Division "Livorno" had been transferred from its bases and recruiting area in southern Piedmont to Sicily in February 1943. Initially intended as reinforcement for Army Group Africa fighting in Tunisia, the Army Group's disastrous situation and retreat to Tunis prevented the division's transfer to Tunisia. The division's pre-deployment headquarters were in Cuneo, while's its two infantry regiments had been based in Cuneo (33rd) and Fossano (34th), where also the division's artillery regiment had been based.

- 4th Infantry Division "Livorno" - Generale di Divisione Domenico Chirieleison
  - 33rd Infantry Regiment "Livorno"
    - 3x Fusilier battalions (2x motorized)
    - Support Weapons Company (65/17 infantry support guns)
    - Mortar Company (81mm Mod. 35 mortars)
  - 34th Infantry Regiment "Livorno"
    - 3x Fusilier battalions (2x motorized)
    - Support Weapons Company (65/17 infantry support guns)
    - Mortar Company (81mm Mod. 35 mortars)
  - 185th Infantry Regiment "Nembo" (attached from 3 to 13 August 1943)
    - III Paratroopers Battalion
    - VIII Paratroopers Battalion
    - XI Paratroopers Battalion
    - Cannons Company (47/32 anti-tank guns)
  - 28th Artillery Regiment "Livorno"
    - I Motorized Group (100/17 howitzers)
    - II Motorized Group (100/17 howitzers)
    - III Motorized Group (75/18 Mod. 35 field guns)
    - IV Motorized Group (75/18 field guns)
    - 78th Anti-aircraft Battery (20/65 anti-aircraft guns)
    - 2x Anti-aircraft batteries (20/65 anti-aircraft guns)
  - IV Self-propelled Anti-tank Battalion (47/32 L40 self-propelled guns; detached to Tactical Group "Carmito")
  - IV Mortar Battalion (81mm Mod. 35 mortars)
  - IV Motorized Engineer Battalion
  - XI Sapper Battalion (attached)
  - 4th Anti-tank Company (47/32 anti-tank guns)
  - Division Services

The 54th Infantry Division "Napoli" was one of three divisions, which recruited in Sicily. It mainly drafted men from southern Sicily and had its peacetime headquarters in Caltanissetta. It's two infantry regiments were based in Syracuse (75th) and Agrigento (76th), while the division's artillery regiment was based in Caltanissetta.

- 54th Infantry Division "Napoli", Generale di Divisione Giulio Cesare Gotti Porcinari
  - 75th Infantry Regiment "Napoli"
    - 3x Fusilier battalions
    - Support Weapons Company (47/32 anti-tank guns)
    - Mortar Company (81mm Mod. 35 mortars)
  - 76th Infantry Regiment "Napoli"
    - 3x Fusilier battalions (7th Company/ II Fusilier Battalion detached to Mobile Group "D")
    - Support Weapons Company (47/32 anti-tank guns)
    - Mortar Company (81mm Mod. 35 mortars; one platoon detached to Mobile Group "H")
  - 173rd CC.NN. Legion "Salso"
    - CLXIX CC.NN. Battalion (detached to Mobile Group "G")
    - CLXXIII CC.NN. Battalion (detached to Tactical Group "Comiso-Ispica")
    - 174th CC.NN. Machine Gun Company (detached to Tactical Group "Comiso-Ispica")
  - 54th Artillery Regiment "Napoli"
    - I Group (100/17 howitzers, detached to Tactical Group "Comiso-Ispica")
    - II Group (75/27 field guns)
    - III Motorized Group (75/18 Mod. 35 field guns; all batteries detached to tactical and mobile groups)
    - IV Motorized Group (75/18 field guns; all batteries detached to mobile groups)
    - 21st Anti-aircraft Battery (20/65 anti-aircraft guns; 1st Section detached to Mobile Group "E")
    - 354th Anti-aircraft Battery (20/65 anti-aircraft guns; 1st Section detached to Mobile Group "D")
  - LIV Machine Gun Battalion (81mm Mod. 35 mortars)
  - LIV Mortar Battalion (81mm Mod. 35 mortars, 2nd Company detached to Tactical Group "Comiso-Ispica")
  - CXXVI Motorized Artillery Group (75/27 field guns, 2nd Battery detached to Mobile Group "F")
  - LIV Engineer Battalion
  - 54th Anti-tank Company (47/32 anti-tank guns)
  - Division Services

===== German XIV Panzer Corps =====
The XIV Panzer Corps was activated 18 July 1943 to take command of the 15th Panzergrenadier Division, the Hermann Göring Division, the newly arrived 1st Parachute Division and the 29th Panzergrenadier Division which started to arrive in Sicily on 18 July. The commanding general was General der Panzertruppe Hans-Valentin Hube.

- German XIV Panzer Corps, General der Panzertruppe Hans-Valentin Hube
  - 382nd Panzergrenadier Regiment (reinforcements, arrived 11 July)
    - 2x battalions (a third battalion remained in Naples)
  - 904th Fortress Battalion
  - 923rd Fortress Battalion
  - 926th Fortress Battalion
  - 4th Battery/ I Battalion/ 71st Werfer Regiment (15 cm Nebelwerfer 41 and 21 cm Nebelwerfer 42)
- Panzer Division "Hermann Göring" - Generalleutnant Paul Conrath (attached to XVI Italian Army Corps until the activation of XIV Panzer Corps on 18 July)
  - Panzer Regiment "Hermann Göring"
    - 2x tank battalions, 1x assault gun battalion (43x Panzer III L/M, 7x Panzer III K 3x Panzer III N, 32x Panzer IV F2/G, 20x StuG IIIG, 9x StuH 42)
  - 1st Panzergrenadier Regiment "Hermann Göring"
    - 3x battalions
  - 2nd Panzergrenadier Regiment "Hermann Göring"
    - 3x battalions
  - Panzer Artillery Regiment "Hermann Göring"
    - I Battalion (3x 10.5 cm leFH 18 batteries)
    - II Battalion (2x 10.5 cm leFH 18 and 1x 10 cm sK 18 batteries)
    - III Battalion (2x 15 cm sFH 18 and 1x 10 cm sK 18 batteries)
  - Anti-aircraft Regiment "Hermann Göring"
    - I Battalion (3x 8.8 cm Flak and 2x 2 cm Flak batteries)
    - II Battalion (3x 8.8 cm Flak and 4x 2 cm Flak batteries; reinforcements arriving 30 July)
  - Panzer Reconnaissance Battalion "Hermann Göring"
  - Panzer Engineer Battalion "Hermann Göring"
  - Panzer Signal Battalion "Hermann Göring"
  - Replacement Battalion "Hermann Göring"
  - 2nd Company/ 504th Heavy Tank Battalion (17x Tiger I)
  - Division Services
- 15th Panzergrenadier Division - Generalmajor Eberhard Rodt (one third of the division (a reinforced infantry group) was attached to the XVI Italian Army Corps and the rest to the XII Italian Army Corps until the activation of XIV Panzer Corps on 18 July)
  - 104th Panzergrenadier Regiment
    - 2x battalions
  - 115th Panzergrenadier Regiment
    - 2x battalions
  - 129th Panzergrenadier Regiment
    - 3x battalions
  - 33rd Motorized Artillery Regiment
    - I Battalion (3x 10.5 cm leFH 18 batteries)
    - II Battalion (3x 17 cm Kanone 18 batteries; former 557th Heavy Artillery Battalion)
    - III Battalion (2x 10.5 cm leFH 18 and 1x mortar batteries)
    - IV Battalion (3x 10.5 cm leFH 18 batteries)
  - Panzergrenadier Battalion "Reggio", in Reggio Calabria
  - 215th Panzer Battalion (6x Panzer III, 46x Panzer IV)
  - 33rd Engineer Battalion
  - 315th Anti-aircraft Battalion (2x 8.8 cm Flak, 1x 3.7 cm Flak and 1x 2 cm Flak batteries)
  - 999th Signal Battalion
  - Division Services
- 1st Fallschirmjäger Division - Generalleutnant Richard Heidrich (commenced arriving by air on 12 July; the 1st Fallschirmjäger Regiment was held in reserve at Naples)
  - 3rd Fallschirmjäger Regiment
    - 3x battalions
    - 13th Mortar Company
    - 14th Anti-tank Company
  - 4th Fallschirmjäger Regiment
    - 3x battalions
    - 13th Mortar Company
    - 14th Anti-tank Company
  - 1st Parachute Artillery Regiment
    - I Battalion (3x batteries 7.5 cm GebG 36)
    - II Battalion (3x batteries 7.5 cm GebG 36; with the 1st Fallschirmjäger Regiment at Naples)
  - 1st Parachute Machine Gun Battalion
  - 1st Parachute Panzerjäger Battalion (7.5 cm Pak 40 anti-tank guns)
  - 1st Parachute Engineer Battalion
  - 1st Parachute Signal Battalion
  - Division Services
- 29th Panzergrenadier Division - Generalmajor Walter Fries (commenced arriving in Sicily on 18 July)
  - 15th Panzergrenadier Regiment
    - 3x battalions
    - 13th Mortar Company (6x sIG Grille)
    - 14th Anti-tank Company (3x 7.5 cm Pak 40, 6x 5 cm Pak 38)
  - 71st Panzergrenadier Regiment
    - 3x battalions
    - 13th Company (6x sIG Grille)
    - 14th Anti-tank Company (3x 7.5 cm Pak 40, 6x 5 cm Pak 38)
  - 29th Artillery Regiment
    - I Self-propelled Battalion (18x le.F.H. Wespe)
    - II Battalion
    - III Battalion
  - 129th Panzer Battalion (43x StuG III, 3x Panzer III K)
  - 129th Panzer Reconnaissance Battalion (remained in Southern Italy)
  - 29th Engineer Battalion
  - 313th Anti-aircraft Battalion (2x 8.8 cm Flak and 1x 3.7 cm Flak batteries)
  - 29th Signal Battalion
  - Division Services

===== Territorial Defense Command Palermo =====
The Territorial Defense Command was tasked with rear area security duties, the training of recruits, and the formation of units.

- Territorial Defense Command Palermo, in Palermo
  - 25th Military Zone, in Palermo
    - Infantry Complementary Officer Recruits School
    - 185th Coastal Regiment (activated on 20 May 1943)
    - 186th Coastal Regiment (activated on 1 June 1943 - not fully mobilized)
    - 188th Coastal Regiment (activated on 15 June 1943 - not fully mobilized)
    - 189th Coastal Regiment (activated on 15 June 1943 - not fully mobilized)
    - Territorial Carabinieri Legion "Palermo"
    - 13th CC.NN. Railway Legion (rail transport police)
    - 22nd CC.NN. Anti-aircraft Legion
      - See Territorial Anti-aircraft Defense section for details
    - 5th CC.NN. Road Units Group (traffic police)
    - I CC.NN. Forestry Battalion (forest/environmental police)
    - CCCLXVIII Mobile Territorial CC.NN. Battalion
    - CCCLXX Territorial CC.NN. Battalion
    - CCCLXXI Territorial CC.NN. Battalion
    - CCCLXXII Territorial CC.NN. Battalion
    - 58th, 59th, 67th, 68th, 72nd, 73rd, and 74th Coastal CC.NN. companies
    - 4x Coastal artillery batteries
    - 28th Infantry Division "Aosta" Depot, in Palermo
    - 54th Infantry Division "Napoli" Depot, in Caltanissetta
  - 26th Military Zone, in Messina
    - Territorial Carabinieri Legion "Messina"
    - DLXVII Mobile Territorial CC.NN. Battalion
    - CCCLXXIII Territorial CC.NN. Battalion
    - 75th Coastal CC.NN. Company
    - 29th Infantry Division "Piemonte" Depot, in Messina

The 29th Infantry Division "Piemonte" was one of three infantry divisions, which recruited in Sicily. It mainly drafted men from eastern Sicily and had its peacetime headquarters in Messina. It's two infantry regiments were based in Messina (3rd) and Catania (4th), with the division's artillery regiment based also in Messina. In September 1940 the division was transferred to Albania and remained in the Balkans and Greece until it disbanded after the Italian-Allied Armistice of Cassibile.

==== Maritime Military Command Sicily ====
Military harbors in Sicily were under command of the Royal Italian Navy's Maritime Military Command Sicily (Italian: Comando Militare Marittimo in Sicilia) in Messina, which fell under Armed Forces Command Sicily. The command's commanding officer was Ammiraglio di Squadra Pietro Barone and a large majority of its units were Royal Italian Army and CC.NN. units. The only naval units in Sicily in July 1943 were twenty torpedo boats of the 3rd and 7th torpedo boat squadrons.

Besides the three major commands listed below the Royal Italian Navy was also present with administrative Navy Commands in Catania, Palermo, and Porto Empedocle.

===== Maritime Military Base Messina-Reggio Calabria =====
- Maritime Military Base Messina-Reggio Calabria, in Messina - Ammiraglio di Squadra Pietro Barone
  - 116th Coastal Regiment, in Reggio Calabria
    - CLVI Coastal Battalion
    - DII Coastal Battalion
  - 119th Coastal Regiment
    - CCCLXX Coastal Battalion
    - CCCLXXI Coastal Battalion
    - CDXLII Coastal Battalion
    - DIII Coastal Battalion
  - 95th CC.NN. Legion "Marzocco"
    - XCIII CC.NN. Battalion
    - XCV CC.NN. Battalion
    - 93rd CC.NN. Machine Gun Company
  - DLXIII Mobile Territorial CC.NN. Battalion (from the 163rd CC.NN. Legion "Tommaso Gulli" in Reggio Calabria)
  - DLXVI Mobile Territorial CC.NN. Battalion
  - XXIII Dismounted Group "Cavalleggeri di Palermo"
  - CCLV Coastal Artillery Battalion, in Reggio Calabria (100/22 howitzers)
  - CLVIII Coastal Artillery Battalion (149/19 heavy guns)

====== 6th CC.NN. Maritime Artillery Legion ======
- 6th CC.NN. Maritime Artillery Legion, in Messina
  - 50th, 51st, 52nd, 53rd, 54th, and 55th Coastal CC.NN. companies
  - Sicilian Command Group North, in Fort Menaja
    - Coastal Artillery Battery "Masotto" (6x 280/9 coastal defense howitzers)
    - Coastal Artillery Battery "Spartà" (3x 152/45 naval guns and 1x 120/40 naval gun)
    - Coastal Artillery Battery "Mezzacapo" (4x 120/50 naval guns)
    - Artillery Battery "RE 198" (4x 105/28 field guns; Royal Italian Army)
    - Searchlights at Pace del Mela and Torre Faro; optical telegraph at Fort Spuria; reconnaissance station at Piano del Giglio
    - Anti-aircraft Command Group North, at Tremonti
      - Dual-role Battery "MS 123" (4x 90/42 naval/anti-aircraft guns)
      - Dual-role Battery "MS 400" (4x 76/40 naval/anti-aircraft guns)
      - Anti-aircraft Battery "MS 475" (4x 90/53 anti-aircraft guns)
      - Anti-aircraft Battery "MS 577" (4x 76/40 anti-aircraft guns)
      - Anti-aircraft Battery "MS 724" (4x 90/53 anti-aircraft guns)
      - Anti-aircraft Battery "MS 949" (4x 90/53 anti-aircraft guns)
  - Sicilian Command Group South, in Puntale Cappellaro
    - Coastal Artillery Battery "Cavalli" (6x 280/9 coastal defense howitzers)
    - Coastal Artillery Battery "Margottini" (3x 152/45 naval guns and 1x 120/40 naval gun)
    - Coastal Artillery Battery "De Cristofaro" (4x 120/40 naval guns)
    - Artillery Battery "RE 199" (4x 105/28 field guns; Royal Italian Army)
    - Searchlight at Tremestieri
    - Anti-aircraft Command Group South, at Montepiselli
      - Dual-role Battery "MS 3" (4x 76/40 naval/anti-aircraft guns)
      - Dual-role Battery "MS 280" (4x 90/53 naval/anti-aircraft guns)
      - Dual-role Battery "MS 525" (4x 90/42 naval/anti-aircraft guns)
      - Dual-role Battery "MS 611" (4x 76/40 naval/anti-aircraft guns)

After the allies had landed on Sicily the Maritime Military Base Messina-Reggio Calabria was reinforced with every available anti-aircraft battery to protect the vital supply route over the Strait of Messina. Until the end of July the following anti-aircraft units had reached Messina:

- Anti-aircraft Battery "MS 120" (4x 90/53 anti-aircraft guns)
- Dual-role Battery "MS 159" (4x 90/42 naval/anti-aircraft guns)
- Anti-aircraft Battery "MS 253" (4x 76/40 anti-aircraft guns)
- Anti-aircraft Battery "MS 277" (4x 90/53 anti-aircraft guns)
- Anti-aircraft Battery "MS 328" (4x 90/53 anti-aircraft guns)
- Anti-aircraft Battery "RE 344" (8x 37/54 anti-aircraft guns; Royal Italian Army)
- Anti-aircraft Battery "MS 349" (4x 90/53 anti-aircraft guns)
- Anti-aircraft Battery "MS 434" (4x 90/53 anti-aircraft guns)
- Anti-aircraft Battery "MS 477" (4x 76/40 anti-aircraft guns)
- Anti-aircraft Battery "MS 553" (8x 37/54 anti-aircraft guns)
- Dual-role Battery "MS 620" (4x 90/53 naval/anti-aircraft guns)
- Dual-role Battery "MS 713" (4x 76/40 naval/anti-aircraft guns)
- Anti-aircraft Battery "MS 807" (4x 90/53 anti-aircraft guns)
- Anti-aircraft Battery "MS 881" (4x 90/53 anti-aircraft guns)
- Anti-aircraft Battery "MS 905" (4x 76/40 anti-aircraft guns)
- Anti-aircraft Battery "MS 940" (4x 90/53 anti-aircraft guns)

Additionally the German Army's 281st Flak Battalion had been transferred to Messina with eight 8.8 cm Flak and six smaller caliber anti-aircraft batteries. After arriving in Messina the 281st Battalion was renamed "Flak Subgroup Messina". Retreating Italian army troops brought a further three 75/46 and six 90/53 anti-aircraft batteries to Messina. On 2 August the retreating 22nd Flak Brigade of the Luftwaffe arrived in Messina and took command of all Axis air-defense units.

====== 14th CC.NN. Maritime Artillery Legion ======
- 14th CC.NN. Maritime Artillery Legion, in Reggio Calabria
  - Calabrian Command Group North, at Fort Siacci
    - Coastal Artillery Battery "Beleno" (6x 280/9 coastal defense howitzers)
    - Artillery Battery "RE 196" (4x 105/28 field guns; Royal Italian Army)
    - Searchlights at Scilla, Santa Trada, and Punta Pezzo
  - Calabrian Command Group South, in Pentimele Sud
    - Coastal Artillery Battery "Pellizzari" (4x 280/9 coastal defense howitzers)
    - Coastal Artillery Battery "Conteduca" (4x 152/50 and 1x 120/40 naval guns)
    - Artillery Battery "RE 197" (4x 105/28 field guns; Royal Italian Army)
    - Searchlights at Catona and Pentimele; reconnaissance Station at Torre Lupo
    - Anti-aircraft Command Group Reggio Calabria:
      - Dual-role Battery "MS 110" (4x 90/42 naval/anti-aircraft guns)
      - Anti-aircraft Battery "MS 116" (4x 90/53 anti-aircraft guns)
      - Dual-role Battery "MS 268" (4x 90/53 naval/anti-aircraft guns)
      - Anti-aircraft Battery "MS 374" (4x 76/40 anti-aircraft guns)
      - Anti-aircraft Battery "MS 430" (4x 90/53 anti-aircraft guns)
      - Dual-role Battery "MS 643" (4x 90/53 naval/anti-aircraft guns)
      - Dual-role Battery "MS 819" (4x 90/53 naval/anti-aircraft guns)

Additionally the Luftwaffe's 182nd Heavy Flak Battalion had been transferred to Reggio Calabria with eight 8.8 cm Flak, four 10.5 cm Flak, and five smaller caliber anti-aircraft batteries. After arriving in Reggio Calabria the 182nd Battalion was renamed "Flak Subgroup Reggio-San Giovanni". The Germans also deployed four 17 cm cannon batteries as mobile coastal batteries on the Calabrian side of the strait. On 2 August the retreating 22nd Flak Brigade of the Luftwaffe arrived in Messina and took command of all Axis air-defense units.

===== Maritime Military Sector Augusta-Syracuse =====
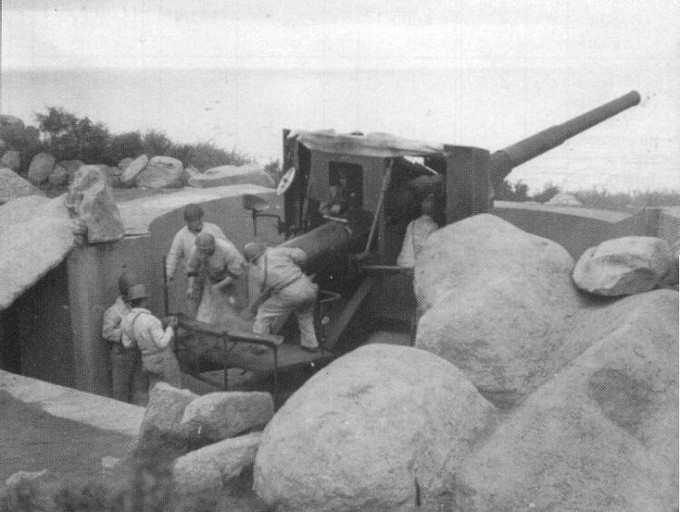
"Lamba Doria" battery 152/50 cannon

The Maritime Military Sector Augusta-Syracuse was responsible for the harbors of Augusta and Syracuse, and the coast between Arenella (206th Coastal Division) to the South and Punta Castelluccio in Agnone Bagni (213th Coastal Division) to the North.

- Maritime Military Sector Augusta-Syracuse, in Augusta - Ammiraglio di Divisione Priamo Leonardi
  - 121st Coastal Regiment
    - CCXLVI Coastal Battalion, in Augusta
    - CCCLXXXV Coastal Battalion, in Syracuse
    - DIV Coastal Battalion, between Augusta and Melilli
    - DXL Coastal Battalion, between Belvedere and Grottone
    - 80th Artillery Battery
    - 5x Blockposts
  - CCCLXIX Territorial CC.NN. Battalion
  - I Protection Battalion (Royal Italian Air Force unit at Seaplane Base Syracuse)
  - 1x Royal Italian Navy battalion
  - 5x Anti-paratrooper units

====== 7th CC.NN. Maritime Artillery Legion ======
- 7th CC.NN. Maritime Artillery Legion
  - 60th, and 63rd Coastal CC.NN. companies
  - Augusta Sector
    - Coastal Artillery Battery "Luigi di Savoia" (2x 203/50 naval guns)
    - Coastal Artillery Battery "Biagio Assereto" (3x 152/50 and 1x 120/40 naval guns)
    - Coastal Artillery Battery "Bozzo Gravina"(3x 152/50 and 1x 120/40 naval guns)
    - Floating Battery "GM 216" (2x 190/45 naval guns, 2x 20/70 anti-aircraft guns)
    - Floating battery "GM 239"(2x 149/47 and 1x 76/40 naval guns, 2x 20/70 anti-aircraft guns)
    - Dual-role Battery "AS 269" (6x 102/35 naval/anti-aircraft guns)
    - Dual-role Battery "AS 360" (6x 76/40 naval/anti-aircraft guns)
    - Dual-role Battery "AS 361" (6x 102/35 naval/anti-aircraft guns)
    - Dual-role Battery "AS 362" (6x 102/35 naval/anti-aircraft guns)
    - Dual-role Battery "AS 363" (6x 76/40 naval/anti-aircraft guns)
    - Anti-aircraft Battery "AS 364" (6x 76/40 anti-aircraft guns)
    - Dual-role Battery "AS 383" (6x 102/35 naval/anti-aircraft guns)
    - Anti-aircraft Battery "AS 416" (6x 76/40 anti-aircraft guns)
    - Dual-role Battery "AS 561" (6x 102/35 naval/anti-aircraft guns)
    - Anti-aircraft Battery "AS 592" (6x 102/35 anti-aircraft guns)
    - Anti-aircraft Battery "AS 674" (6x 76/40 anti-aircraft guns)
    - Dual-role Battery "AS 741" (6x 76/40 naval/anti-aircraft guns)
    - Dual-role Battery "AS 896" (6x 76/40 naval/anti-aircraft guns)
  - Autonomous Group "Siracusa", in Syracuse
    - Coastal Artillery Battery "Opera A" (2x 381/40 naval guns)
    - Coastal Artillery Battery "Emanuele Russo"(3x 152/50 and 1x 120/40 naval guns)
    - Coastal Artillery Battery "Lamba Doria"(3x 152/50 and 1x 120/40 naval guns)
    - Dual-role Battery "AS 309" (6x 76/40 naval/anti-aircraft guns)
    - Dual-role Battery "AS 365" (6x 76/40 naval/anti-aircraft guns)
    - Dual-role Battery "AS 493" (6x 102/35 naval/anti-aircraft guns)
    - Dual-role Battery "AS 671" (6x 76/40 naval/anti-aircraft guns)
    - Dual-role Battery "AS 909" (6x 76/40 naval/anti-aircraft guns)

===== Maritime Military Sector Trapani =====
- Maritime Military Sector Trapani, in Trapani - Rear Admiral Giuseppe Manfredi
  - 137th Coastal Regiment
    - CDXLIII Coastal Battalion
    - DV Coastal Battalion
    - DCCCXLIV Coastal Battalion
  - CCCLXXIV Territorial CC.NN. Battalion
  - 8th CC.NN. Maritime Artillery Legion
    - 9x Anti-ship artillery batteries (Royal Italian Navy)
    - 76th, 77th, 78th, 79th, 80th, 81st, and 82nd Coastal CC.NN. companies
  - Anti-aircraft Command Group Trapani:
    - 3x Anti-aircraft batteries (102/35 anti-aircraft guns; Royal Italian Navy)
    - 1x Anti-aircraft battery (90/53 anti-aircraft guns; Royal Italian Navy)
    - 5x Anti-aircraft batteries (76/40 anti-aircraft guns; Royal Italian Navy)
    - 1x Anti-aircraft battery (102/35 anti-aircraft guns; CC.NN.)
    - 2x Anti-aircraft batteries (90/53 anti-aircraft guns; CC.NN.)
    - 3x Anti-aircraft batteries (76/40 anti-aircraft guns; CC.NN.)

===== Armored Trains =====
The Royal Italian Navy fielded 14 armored trains, which were equipped with naval guns that had been removed from decommissioned ships. Ten of the trains were assigned to the Armed Forces Command Sicily before the allied landings, with eight trains being transferred to Sicily and two based on the Italian mainland near Reggio Calabria to provide fire for the defense of the Strait of Messina. The ten trains of the Armed Forces Command Sicily on 10 July 1943 were:

- Type 1 Operational Train (4x 120/45 Mod. 1918 naval guns, 4x 20/77 anti-aircraft guns)
  - Armored Train 120/1/S, in Siderno (attached to the 211th Coastal Division in Calabria)
  - Armored Train 120/3/S, in Porto Empedocle (attached to the 207th Coastal Division)
  - Armored Train 120/4/S, in Catania (attached to the 213th Coastal Division)
- Type 2 Operational Train (4x 152/40 naval guns, 4x 20/77 anti-aircraft guns)
  - Armored Train 152/1/T, in Termini Imerese (attached to the 208th Coastal Division)
  - Armored Train 152/2/T, in Carini (attached to the 208th Coastal Division)
  - Armored Train 152/3/T, in Crotone (attached to the 212th Coastal Division in Calabria)
- Type 3 Operational Train (6x 76/40 Mod. 1916 naval guns, 4x 20/77 anti-aircraft guns)
  - Armored Train 76/1/T, in Porto Empedocle (attached to the 207th Coastal Division)
- Type 3-bis Operational Train (4x 76/40 Mod. 1916 naval guns, 4x 20/77 anti-aircraft guns)
  - Armored Train 76/2/T, in Licata (attached to the 207th Coastal Division)
  - Armored Train 76/3/T, in Mazara del Vallo (attached to the 202nd Coastal Division)
- Type 4 Operational Train (6x 102/35 Mod. 1914 naval guns, 4x 20/77 anti-aircraft guns)
  - Armored Train 102/1/T, in Syracuse (attached to the 206th Coastal Division)

The ten armored trains did not take part in any combat operation after the allied landings in Sicily, as the allies' absolute air supremacy prevent the trains from leaving their camouflaged shelters. The eight trains based in Sicily were blown up by their crews during the retreat from the island.

==== Air Force Command Sicily ====
Airfields in Sicily were under command of the Royal Italian Air Force's Air Force Command Sicily, which fell under Armed Forces Command Sicily. The commanding officer was Generale di divisione aerea Adriano Monti.

Each airfield was garrisoned by two infantry companies, reinforced by two mortar squads with 81mm Mod. 35 mortars, and two artillery batteries with 149/12 howitzers.

The airfields and units under command of Air Force Command Sicily on 10 July 1943, and the reinforcements, which arrived in Sicily on 10 and 11 July 1943, were:

- Augusta Airfield
  - 8th Naval Reconnaissance Squadron (Z.506 Airone and RS.14 float planes)
    - 170th and 186th flights (197th Flight detached to Stagnone Airfield)
- Castelvetrano Airfield
  - 16th Fighter Squadron (C.202 Folgore fighters)
    - 167th, 168th, and 169th flights
  - Staff Schlachtgeschwader 2
    - I/Schlachtgeschwader 2, at Milis Airfield in Sardinia (Fw 190 F-2 fighters)
    - II/Schlachtgeschwader 2 (Fw 190 F-2 fighters)
- Chinisia Airfield
  - 21st Fighter Squadron (C.202 Folgore fighters)
    - 356th, 361st, and 386th flights
  - 155th Fighter Squadron (C.205 Veltro fighters; arrived from Monserrato Airfield)
    - 351st and 360th flights (378th Flight remained at Monserrato)
- Comiso Airfield
  - 3rd Fighter Squadron (Bf.109G fighters)
    - 153rd, 154th, and 155th flights
  - Staff Jagdgeschwader 53
    - I/Jagdgeschwader 53, at Vibo Valentia Airfield (Bf 109 G6 fighters)
    - II/Jagdgeschwader 53, at Gerbini Airfield (Bf 109 G6 fighters)
    - III/Jagdgeschwader 53, at Sigonella Airfield (Bf 109 G6 fighters)
  - II/Nachtjagdgeschwader 2 Ju-88C6
  - III/Schnellkampfgeschwader 10, at Comiso Airfield (Fw 190 A-5 fighters)
- Gerbini Airfield
  - 131st Torpedo-Bomber Squadron (SM.79 Sparviero torpedo-bombers)
    - 279th and 284th flights
  - Staff Schnellkampfgeschwader 10
    - II/Schnellkampfgeschwader 10 (Fw 190 A-5 fighters)
    - III/Schnellkampfgeschwader 10, at Comiso Airfield (Fw 190 A-5 fighters)
    - IV/Schnellkampfgeschwader 10 (Fw 190 A-5 fighters)
  - II/Jagdgeschwader 53 (Bf 109 G6 fighters)
- Palermo-Boccadifalco Airfield
  - 66th Reconnaissance Squadron (Ca.311, Ca.313, and Ca.314 reconnaissance/attack planes)
    - 131st Flight (87th Flight detached to Sigonella Airfield)
  - 153rd Fighter Squadron (C.202 Folgore fighters)
    - 372nd, 373rd, 374th, and 377th flights
  - 46th Assault Squadron (CR.42 Falco fighters; arrived from Capoterra Airfield)
    - 20th Flight
  - 47th Assault Squadron (CR.42 Falco fighters; arrived from Oristano Airfield)
    - 53rd Flight
  - 207th Flight/ 103rd Dive-Bomber Squadron (Ju.87D Stuka dive bombers; arrived from Decimomannu Airfield)
  - Elements of the 3rd Fighter Wing with C.202 Folgore fighter arrived from Cerveteri Airfield near Rome on 11 July
- Reggio Calabria Airfield (located just over the Messina Strait on mainland Italy)
  - 161st Fighter Squadron (C.200 Saetta, Dewoitine D.520, and C.202 Folgore fighters)
    - 162nd, 164th, and 371st flights
- Stagnone Airfield
  - 197th Flight/ 8th Naval Reconnaissance Squadron
- Sciacca Airfield
  - 150th Fighter Squadron (Bf.109G fighters)
    - 363rd, 364th, and 365th flights
  - Staff Jagdgeschwader 77
    - I/Jagdgeschwader 77 (Bf 109 G6 fighters)
    - 2.(F)/Aufklärungsgruppe 122 (Ju 88 A and Me 410 Hornisse planes)
- Catania-Sigonella Airfield
  - 4th Fighter Wing
    - 9th Fighter Squadron (C.202 Folgore and C.205 Veltro fighters)
      - 73rd, 96th, and 97th flights
    - 10th Fighter Squadron (C.202 Folgore and C.205 Veltro fighters)
      - 84th, 90th, and 91st flights
  - 22nd Fighter Squadron (Re.2001 Falco II and Re.2005 Sagittario fighters; arrived from Naples-Capodichino Airfield)
    - 362nd and 369th flights
  - 87th Flight/ 66th Reconnaissance Squadron
  - III/Jagdgeschwader 53 (Bf 109 G6 fighters)

Airfields without flying units:

- Finocchiara Airfield
- Milazzo Airfield
- Milo Airfield

===== 3rd Air Fleet =====
Bombers and torpedo-bombers of 3rd Air Fleet entered combat in support of Air Force Command Sicily starting from 10 July 1943.

- 3rd Air Fleet
  - Bomber Group, at Perugia Airfield
    - 28th Bomber Squadron, at Perugia Airfield (Z.1007 Alcione bombers)
      - 10th and 19th flights
    - 29th Bomber Squadron, at Viterbo Airfield (Ju 88 A bombers)
      - 62nd and 63rd flights
  - 51st Bomber Squadron, at Viterbo Airfield (Ju 88 A Alcione bombers)
      - 212th and 213th flights
    - 86th Bomber Squadron, at Perugia Airfield (Z.1007 Alcione bombers)
      - 190th and 191st flights
    - 88th Bomber Squadron, at Perugia Airfield (Z.1007 Alcione bombers)
      - 264th and 265th flights
    - 106th Bomber Squadron, at Perugia Airfield (Z.1007 Alcione bombers)
      - 260th and 261st flights
  - Torpedo-Bomber Group
    - 41st Torpedo-Bomber Squadron, at Siena Airfield (SM.79 Sparviero Sparviero torpedo-bombers)
      - 204th and 205th flights
    - 89th Torpedo-Bomber Squadron, at Siena Airfield (SM.79 Sparviero torpedo-bombers)
      - 228th and 229th flights
    - 104th Torpedo-Bomber Squadron, at Siena Airfield (SM.79 Sparviero torpedo-bombers)
      - 252nd and 253rd flights
    - 108th Torpedo-Bomber Squadron, at Pisa Airfield (SM.79 Sparviero torpedo-bombers)
      - 256th and 257th flights
    - 130th Torpedo-Bomber Squadron, at Littoria Airfield (SM.79 Sparviero torpedo-bombers)
      - 280th and 283rd flights
    - 132nd Torpedo-Bomber Squadron, at Littoria Airfield (SM.79 Sparviero torpedo-bombers)
      - 278th and 281st flights
  - 274th Long Range Bomber Flight, at Guidonia Airfield (P.108 heavy bombers)

===== 4th Air Fleet =====
Aircraft of the 4th Air Fleet based in Southern Italy entered combat in support of Air Force Command Sicily from 10 July 1943. At the same date reinforcements from other air fleets began to arrive in Southern Italy to reinforce 4th Air Fleet.

- Crotone Airfield
  - 97th Interceptor Squadron (Ro.57 fighters)
    - 226th and 227th flights
  - 102nd Dive-Bomber Squadron (Re.2002 Ariete fighter-bombers; arrived from Tarquinia Airfield)
    - 209th and 239th flights
  - 158th Assault Squadron (G.50 Freccia fighters; arrived from Osoppo Airfield)
    - elements of 236th, 387th, and 388th flights
  - 159th Assault Squadron (G.50 Freccia fighters; arrived from Pistoia Airfield)
    - 389th, 390th, and 391st flights
- Gioia del Colle Airfield
  - 98th Bomber Squadron (SM.84 bombers; arrived from Lonate Pozzolo Airfield)
    - 240th and 241st flights
  - 121st Dive-Bomber Squadron (Ju.87D Stuka dive bombers; arrived from Lonate Pozzolo Airfield)
    - 206th and 216th flights
  - 237th Flight/ 103rd Dive-Bomber Squadron (Ju.87D Stuka dive bombers; arrived from Decimomannu Airfield)
- Grottaglie Airfield
  - 157th Fighter Squadron (C.200 Saetta fighters)
    - 163rd, 357th, 371st, and 384th flights
- Lecce Airfield
  - IV/Jagdgeschwader 4, (Bf 109 G6)
- Manduria Airfield
  - 8th Bomber Wing
    - 27th Bomber Squadron (Z.1007 Alcione bombers)
      - 18th and 52nd flights
  - 101st Dive-Bomber Squadron (Re.2002 Ariete fighter-bombers; arrived from Lonate Pozzolo Airfield)
    - 208th and 238th flights
- Montecorvino Airfield
  - II/Zerstörer-Geschwader 1 (Me-110 G2)
- Vibo Valentia Airfield
  - I/Jagdgeschwader 53, (Bf 109 G6)
  - II/Jagdgeschwader 27, (Bf-10 9G6)

==== Territorial Anti-aircraft Defense ====
The Territorial Anti-aircraft Defense (Italian: Milizia per la Difesa Contraerea Territoriale - MDICAT) was an organization of the Italian National Fascist Party's Voluntary Militia for National Security tasked with static air-defense of cities and installations. The MDICAT was organized in 22 legions, which commanded all ground-based air-defense units, including Royal Italian Army and Royal Italian Navy units, in their sector. The territorial anti-aircraft defense unit responsible for Sicily was the 22nd Territorial CC.NN. Anti-aircraft Legion. The list below gives an overview of the 22nd Legion's batteries sorted by cities with the respective services army (RA), navy (RN), and militia (CC.NN.) listed.

The anti-aircraft batteries in Messina, Reggio Calabria, Augusta, and Trapani were detached to the Royal Italian Navy's maritime military commands in these cities.

- Territorial Anti-aircraft Defense - 22nd Territorial CC.NN. Anti-aircraft Legion, in Palermo
  - Ionia
    - 2x Anti-aircraft batteries (90/53 anti-aircraft guns; RA)
    - 2x Anti-aircraft batteries (20/65 anti-aircraft guns; RA)
  - Gerbini Airfield
    - 1x Anti-aircraft battery (37/54 anti-aircraft guns; RA)
    - 1x Anti-aircraft battery (37/54 anti-aircraft guns; CC.NN.)
    - 2x Anti-aircraft batteries (76/40 anti-aircraft guns; RA)
  - Catania
    - 460th Anti-aircraft Battery (90/53 anti-aircraft guns; CC.NN.)
    - 483rd Anti-aircraft Battery (76/40 anti-aircraft guns; RN)
    - 813th Anti-aircraft Battery (20/65 anti-aircraft guns; CC.NN.)
    - 2x Anti-aircraft batteries (37/54 anti-aircraft guns; RA)
    - 2x Anti-aircraft batteries (75/46 anti-aircraft guns; RA)
    - 5x Anti-aircraft batteries (90/53 anti-aircraft guns; CC.NN.)
    - 6x Anti-aircraft batteries (76/40 anti-aircraft guns; CC.NN.)
    - 2x Anti-aircraft batteries (37/54 anti-aircraft guns; CC.NN.)
    - 2x Anti-aircraft batteries (20/65 anti-aircraft guns; CC.NN.)
  - San Pietro Clarenza
    - XXXI Anti-aircraft Group
      - 18th and 19th Anti-aircraft batteries (76/40 anti-aircraft guns; CC.NN.)
      - 232nd and 827th Anti-aircraft batteries (20/65 anti-aircraft guns; CC.NN.)
  - Gela
    - 22nd Anti-aircraft Battery (76/40 anti-aircraft guns; CC.NN.)
    - 23rd Anti-aircraft Battery (76/40 anti-aircraft guns; CC.NN.)
    - 93rd Anti-aircraft Battery (76/40 anti-aircraft guns; CC.NN.)
    - 333rd Anti-aircraft Battery (37/54 anti-aircraft guns; RA)
    - 334th Anti-aircraft Battery (37/54 anti-aircraft guns; RA)
    - 523rd Anti-aircraft Battery (37/54 anti-aircraft guns; RA)
    - 796th Anti-aircraft Battery (20/65 anti-aircraft guns; RA)
    - 1x Anti-aircraft battery (20/65 anti-aircraft guns; RA)
  - Licata
    - 675th Anti-aircraft Battery (76/40 anti-aircraft guns; RN)
    - 791st Anti-aircraft Battery (20/65 anti-aircraft guns; CC.NN.)
  - Porto Empedocle
    - LXXVII Anti-aircraft Group
      - 644th, 645th, 646th, and 669th batteries (90/53 anti-aircraft guns; CC.NN.)
    - 1x Anti-aircraft battery (76/40 anti-aircraft guns; RN)
    - 1x Anti-aircraft battery (20/65 anti-aircraft guns; CC.NN.)
    - 1x Anti-aircraft battery (37/54 anti-aircraft guns; RA)
  - Sciacca
    - 816th Anti-aircraft Battery (20/65 anti-aircraft guns; CC.NN.)
    - 1x Anti-aircraft battery (90/53 anti-aircraft guns; CC.NN.)
    - 3x Anti-aircraft batteries (76/40 anti-aircraft guns; CC.NN.)
    - 1x Anti-aircraft battery (37/54 anti-aircraft guns; RA)
    - 1x Anti-aircraft battery (20/65 anti-aircraft guns; CC.NN.)
  - Castelvetrano
    - LXXXIII Anti-aircraft Group, at Castelvetrano
      - 629th and 653rd Anti-aircraft batteries (90/53 anti-aircraft guns; CC.NN.)
      - 795th Anti-aircraft Battery (20/65 anti-aircraft guns; CC.NN.)
    - XC Anti-aircraft Group, at Castelvetrano Airfield
      - 668th and 676th Anti-aircraft batteries (90/53 anti-aircraft guns; CC.NN.)
      - 814th Anti-aircraft Battery (20/65 anti-aircraft guns; CC.NN.)
    - 3x Anti-aircraft batteries (75/27 anti-aircraft guns; RA)
    - 4x Anti-aircraft batteries (37/54 anti-aircraft guns; RA)
    - 2x Anti-aircraft batteries (76/40 anti-aircraft guns; CC.NN.)
    - 2x Anti-aircraft batteries (75/46 anti-aircraft guns; CC.NN.)
  - Marsala
    - 476th Anti-aircraft Battery (90/53 anti-aircraft guns; CC.NN.)
    - 2x Anti-aircraft batteries (90/53 anti-aircraft guns; CC.NN.)
    - 2x Anti-aircraft batteries (20/65 anti-aircraft guns; CC.NN.)
  - Chinisia Airfield
    - LIX Anti-aircraft Group
      - 31st Anti-aircraft Battery (76/40 anti-aircraft guns; CC.NN.)
      - 2x Anti-aircraft batteries (76/40 anti-aircraft guns; CC.NN.)
    - 3x Anti-aircraft batteries (37/54 anti-aircraft guns; RA)
    - 1x Anti-aircraft battery (90/53 anti-aircraft guns; CC.NN.)
  - Palermo
    - 411th Anti-aircraft Battery (102/35 anti-aircraft guns; CC.NN.)
    - 414th Anti-aircraft Battery (76/40 anti-aircraft guns; CC.NN.)
    - 415th Anti-aircraft Battery (76/40 anti-aircraft guns; CC.NN.)
    - 418th Anti-aircraft Battery (76/40 anti-aircraft guns; CC.NN.)
    - 630th Anti-aircraft Battery (90/53 anti-aircraft guns; CC.NN.)
    - 733rd Anti-aircraft Battery (20/65 anti-aircraft guns; RA)
    - 1x Anti-aircraft battery (20/65 anti-aircraft guns; RA)
    - 2x Anti-aircraft batteries (102/35 anti-aircraft guns; CC.NN.)
    - 6x Anti-aircraft batteries (90/53 anti-aircraft guns; CC.NN.)
    - 5x Anti-aircraft batteries (76/40 anti-aircraft guns; CC.NN.)
    - 4x Anti-aircraft batteries (37/54 anti-aircraft guns; CC.NN.)
    - 3x Anti-aircraft batteries (20/65 anti-aircraft guns; CC.NN.)
  - Termini Imerese
    - 468th Anti-aircraft Battery (90/53 anti-aircraft guns; RA)
    - 3x Anti-aircraft batteries (90/53 anti-aircraft guns; RA)
    - 1x Anti-aircraft battery (20/65 anti-aircraft guns; RA)
  - Milazzo
    - 1x Anti-aircraft battery (75/46 anti-aircraft guns; CC.NN.)
    - 2x Anti-aircraft batteries (75/27 anti-aircraft guns; RA)
    - 1x Anti-aircraft battery (20/65 anti-aircraft guns; CC.NN.)

There were also single CC.NN. batteries at Portopalo di Capo Passero, Motta Sant'Anastasia, Vizzini, Pozzallo, Vittoria, Punta Secca, and Costa Raia, and two batteries at Cassibile and two at Lercara Friddi. The Royal Italian Army had single batteries at Pachino, Acireale, Ragusa, and Roccapalumba.

Other batteries deployed in Sicily in July 1943, whose location on the island is unknown, are listed below:

- 20/65 anti-aircraft guns:
  - 59th, 284th, 792nd, 793rd, 815th, 837th, and 1506th batteries
- 75/27 anti-aircraft guns:
  - 8th, 29th, 133rd, 331st, and 452nd batteries
- 75/46 anti-aircraft guns:
  - 524th Battery
- 76/40 anti-aircraft guns:
  - 625th and 648th batteries
- 8.8 cm Flak anti-aircraft guns:
  - 1399th, 1405th, 1408th, 1415th, 1418th, and 1429th batteries
- Batteries with unknown equipment:
  - 342nd, 345th, 413th, 417th, 504th, 650th, 908th batteries

==== Voluntary Militia for National Security ====
The Voluntary Militia for National Security (Italian: Milizia Volontaria per la Sicurezza Nazionale - MVSN) was the Italian National Fascist Party's paramilitary wing. The MVSN had police functions and provided the regime with readily available paramilitary units for internal oppression. During WWII the MVSN raised military units, which were operationally assigned to Royal Italian Army or Royal Italian Navy commands. The MVSN's command authority in Sicily was the 14th Zone and its legions, the units they raised for the defense of Sicily, and the commands these units were assigned to are listed below.

- 14th Zone, in Palermo
  - 166th CC.NN. Legion "Peloro", in Messina (29th Infantry Division "Piemonte")
    - CLXVI (1939) (29th Infantry Division "Piemonte")
    - DLXVI Mobile Territorial CC.NN. Battalion (Maritime Military Base Messina-Reggio Calabria)
    - 50th, 51st, 52nd, 53rd, 54th, and 55th Coastal CC.NN. companies (6th CC.NN. Maritime Artillery Legion)
  - 167th CC.NN. Legion "Etna", in Catania
    - CLXVII (1939) (166th CC.NN. Legion "Peloro"/ 29th Infantry Division "Piemonte")
    - DLXVII Mobile Territorial CC.NN. Battalion (26th Military Zone)
  - 168th CC.NN. Legion "Hyblae", in Ragusa
    - CLXVIII CC.NN. Battalion (171st CC.NN. Legion "Vespri"/ 28th Infantry Division "Aosta")
    - CCCLXVIII Mobile Territorial CC.NN. Battalion (25th Military Zone)
    - 58th and 59th Coastal CC.NN. companies (25th Military Zone)
  - 169th CC.NN. Legion "Tirreno", in Syracuse
    - CLXIX CC.NN. Battalion (173rd CC.NN. Legion "Salso"/ 54th Infantry Division "Napoli")
    - CCCLXIX Territorial CC.NN. Battalion (Maritime Military Sector Augusta-Syracuse)
    - 60th and 63rd Coastal CC.NN. companies (7th CC.NN. Maritime Artillery Legion)
  - 170th CC.NN. Legion "Agrigentum", in Agrigento
    - CCCLXX Territorial CC.NN. Battalion (25th Military Zone)
    - 67th and 68th Coastal CC.NN. companies (25th Military Zone)
  - 171st CC.NN. Legion "Vespri", in Palermo (28th Infantry Division "Aosta")
    - CLXXI CC.NN. Battalion (28th Infantry Division "Aosta")
    - CCCLXXI Territorial CC.NN. Battalion (25th Military Zone)
  - 172nd CC.NN. Legion "Enna", in Enna
    - CCCLXXII Territorial CC.NN. Battalion (25th Military Zone)
    - 72nd, 73rd, and 74th Coastal CC.NN. companies (25th Military Zone)
  - 173rd CC.NN. Legion "Salso", in Caltanissetta (54th Infantry Division "Napoli")
    - CLXXIII CC.NN. Battalion (54th Infantry Division "Napoli")
    - CCCLXXIII Territorial CC.NN. Battalion (26th Military Zone)
    - 75th Coastal CC.NN. Company (26th Military Zone)
  - 174th CC.NN. Legion "Segesta", in Trapani
    - CCCLXXIV Coastal CC.NN. Battalion (Maritime Military Sector Trapani)
    - 76th and 82nd Coastal CC.NN. companies (Maritime Military Sector Trapani)

=== Messina Evacuation ===
During Operation Lehrgang - the Axis evacuation from Sicily - the German evacuation efforts were under command of Seetransportführer Messina (Sea-transport-leader Messina) Kapitän zur See Gustav Freiherr von Liebenstein, while the Italian evacuation was organized by Ammiraglio di Squadra Pietro Barone. The Italians pressed every possible ship into service and used four evacuation routes across the Strait of Messina, while the Germans had brought three landing flotillas to Messina for the evacuation.

- 2. Landungs-Division - Seetransportführer Messina - Kapitän zur See Gustav Freiherr von Liebenstein
  - 2. Landungs-Flottille (2nd Landing Flotilla)
    - 29x Marinefährprahm and other boats; Marinefährprahms F 147, F 466, F 146, F 432, F 460, F 546, F 434, F 618, and F 435 were lost during the evacuation of Sicily
  - 4. Landungs-Flottille (4th Landing Flotilla)
    - 31x Marinefährprahm and 12 other boats; Marinefährprahms F 466, F 432, F 460, F 430, F 429, F 462, F 607, and F 437 were lost during the evacuation of Sicily
  - 10. Landungs-Flottille (10th Landing Flotilla)
    - 9x Siebel ferries and infantry transport boats
  - Pionier-Landungs-Bataillon 771 (771st Engineer Landing Battalion; Army Unit)
    - 6x Marinefährprahm, 14x landing boats, 465 meter of landing bridges, and a number of Storm boats

== See also ==
- Operation Husky

== Notes ==
Footnotes

Citations
