= 206th Coastal Division =

Royal Italian Army infantry division during World War II

- Active: 1941 – 1943
- Country: Kingdom of Italy
- Branch: Royal Italian Army
- Size: Division
- Garrison/HQ: Modica
- Engagements: World War II

Insignia
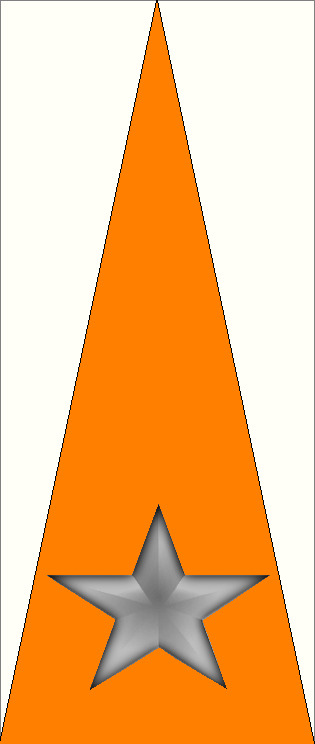
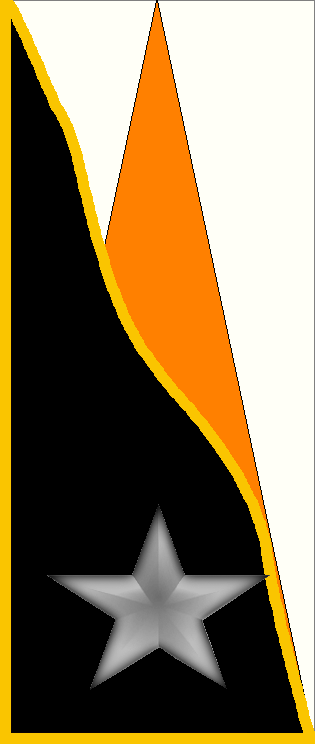
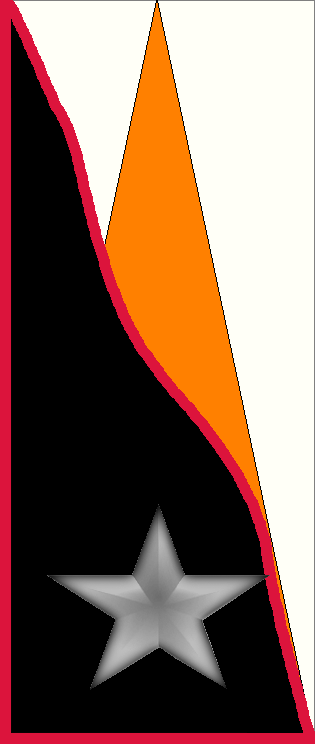
- Identification symbol: 206th Coastal Division gorget patches

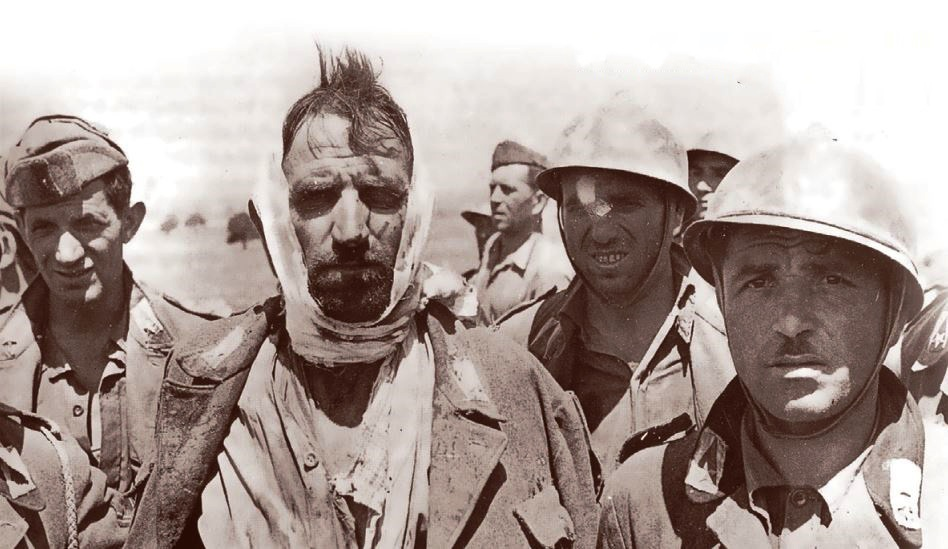
206th Coastal Division soldiers taken prisoner by British forces. Typical of the second-rate equipment issued to the coastal divisions, the soldiers are wearing World War I Adrian helmets, rather than the more modern M33 helmets.

The 206th Coastal Division (Italian: 206ª Divisione Costiera) was an infantry division of the Royal Italian Army during World War II. Royal Italian Army coastal divisions were second line divisions formed with reservists and equipped with second rate materiel. Recruited locally, they were often commanded by officers called out of retirement.

== History ==
The division was activated on 15 November 1941 in Catania by reorganizing the VI Coastal Sector Command. The division was assigned to XVI Army Corps, which was responsible for the defense of the eastern half of the island of Sicily. The division had its headquarter in Modica and was responsible for the coastal defense of the coast between Punta Braccetto in Santa Croce Camerina and Arenella to the South of Syracuse.

The division defended the beaches where the British Eighth Army landed during the Allied invasion of Sicily on 10 July 1943. On D-day the 206th Coastal Division, British and Canadian forces fought for control of the beaches at Avola, Pachino and Cassibile, but the British and Canadian superiority in materiel and numbers crushed the 206th Coastal Division, which by 11 July was reduced to small units surrounded by British and Canadian forces. On 12 July British and Canadian troops eliminated the last resistance and the division was declared lost due to wartime events.

== Organization ==
- 206th Coastal Division
  - 122nd Coastal Regiment
    - CCXLIII Coastal Battalion
    - CCCLXXIV Coastal Battalion
    - CCCLXXV Coastal Battalion
  - 123rd Coastal Regiment
    - CCCLXXXI Coastal Battalion
    - CCCLXXXIII Coastal Battalion
    - DXLII Coastal Battalion
  - 146th Coastal Regiment
    - CDXXX Coastal Battalion
    - CDXXXVII Coastal Battalion
  - 44th Coastal Artillery Grouping
    - CII Coastal Artillery Group (75/27 mod. 06 field guns)
    - CLXI Coastal Artillery Group (149/35 heavy guns)
    - CLXII Coastal Artillery Group (149/35 heavy guns; transferred to the XVIII Coastal Brigade in April 1943)
    - CLXIV Coastal Artillery Group (149/35 heavy guns)
    - CCIX Coastal Artillery Group (100/22 mod. 14/19 howitzers)
    - CCXXIV Coastal Artillery Group (100/22 mod. 14/19 howitzers)
    - 227th Coastal Artillery Battery (105/14 mod. 18 howitzers)
  - CIV Machine Gun Battalion
    - 511th Machine Gun Company
    - 537th Machine Gun Company
    - 542nd Machine Gun Company
    - 625th Machine Gun Company
  - 122nd Mixed Engineer Platoon
  - 123rd Mixed Engineer Platoon
  - 206th Carabinieri Section
  - 163rd Field Post Office
  - Division Services

Attached to the division:

- CCXXXIII Self-propelled Anti-tank Battalion (Semovente da 47/32 self-propelled guns)
- Armored Train 102/1/T, in Syracuse (6 × 102/35 mod. 1914 naval guns, 4 × 20/77 Scotti anti-aircraft guns)

== Commanding officers ==
The division's commanding officer was:

- Generale di Divisione Achille d'Havet (15 November 1941 - 12 July 1943, POW)
