= Cannone da 152/50 =

152/50 A. Mod. 1918
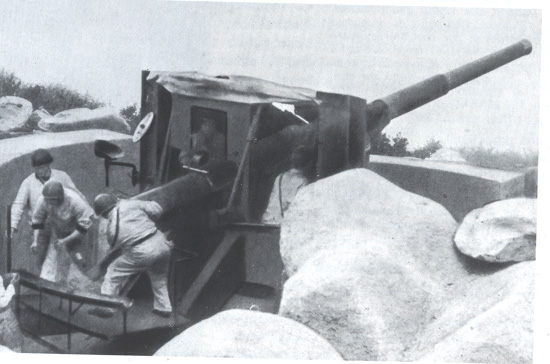
- Type: Coastal artillery
- Place of origin: United Kingdom

Service history
- In service: 1918–1945
- Used by: Italy Regia Marina
- Wars: Second World War

Production history
- Designer: Armstrong
- Designed: 1918
- Manufacturer: Armstrong of Pozzuoli

Specifications
- Mass: 35,804 t (pedestal mounting)
- Height: from rollers to gun-axis: 1,910 m (cupola mounting); 1,300 m (pedestal mounting)
- Shell weight: 47 kg
- Caliber: 152.4 mm
- Barrels: constant right-hand rifling at 58 lines
- Recoil: 500 mm
- Elevation: -1°/+20° (cupola mounting) -4°/+28° (pedestal mounting)
- Traverse: 360°
- Muzzle velocity: 830 metres per second
- Maximum firing range: 19.7 km (12 mi)

The Cannone da 152/50 or 152/50 A. Mod. 1918 was a heavy naval gun, designed in the United Kingdom and produced under licence in Italy. It was used as coastal artillery during the Second World War.

It was originally produced from 1918 onwards by Gio. Ansaldo & C. under licence from Armstrong Whitworth, as indicated by the "A" in its name. It was installed in Regia Marina forts and used by the Milizia Marittima di Artiglieria (MILMART) who manned the batteries.

== Bibliography ==
- (in Italian) Le armi e le artiglierie in servizio di F. Grandi, Ed. fuori commercio, 1938.
