= Latina Air Base =

Latina Airport Aeroporto di Latina
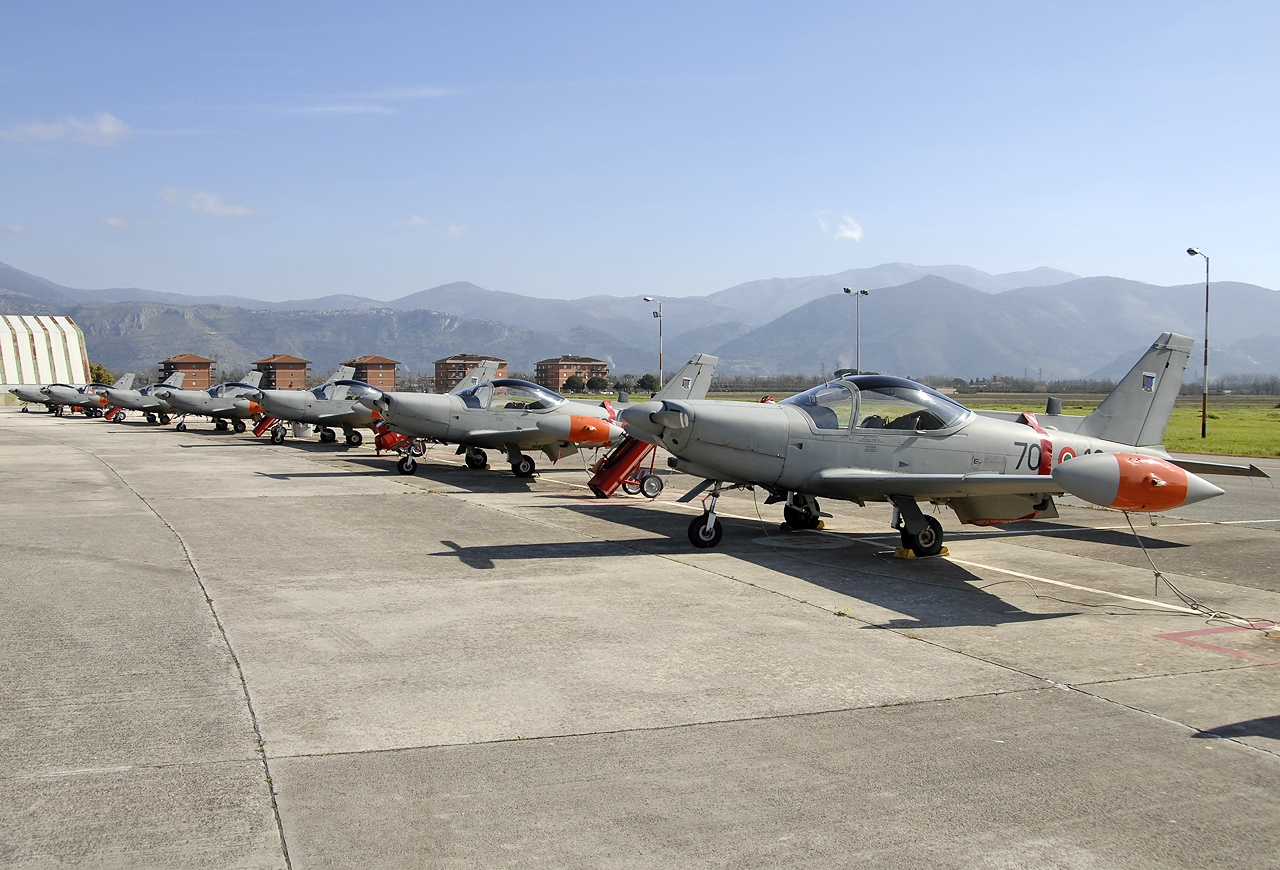
- IATA: none; ICAO: LIRL

Summary
- Airport type: Military
- Operator: Aeronautica Militare Italiana
- Location: Latina, Lazio
- Elevation AMSL: 93 ft (28 m)
- Coordinates: 41°32′32″N 012°54′32″E

Map
- Location of airport in Italy

Runways
Direction	Length		Surface
Direction	m	ft	Surface
12/30	1,700	5,577	Asphalt
- Source: DAFIF

Latina Airport (Italian: Aeroporto di Latina) (ICAO: LIRL) is a military airport located near Latina, a city in the Lazio region of central Italy. The airport is approximately 9 km (5 NM) north of Latina. It is also known as Enrico Comani Airport, named after Enrico Comani, an Italian aviator.

The airport is home to the 70th Wing (70° Stormo) of Italian Air Force (Aeronautica Militare Italiana).

== Facilities ==
The airport resides at an elevation of 93 feet (28 m) above mean sea level. It has one runway designated 12/30 with an asphalt surface measuring 1,700 by 40 metres (5,577 ft × 131 ft).
