= Pietro Barone =

Italian admiral

- Born: 9 April 1881; Modica, Kingdom of Italy
- Died: 28 November 1975 (aged 94); Naples, Italy
- Military career
- Allegiance: Kingdom of Italy
- Branch: Regia Marina
- Service years: 1899-1944
- Rank: Admiral
- Commands: 10 PN (torpedo boat); 54 AS (torpedo boat); Procione (torpedo boat); Saseno Naval Detachment; Pola (heavy cruiser); Taranto Naval Arsenal; Italian East Africa Naval Command; 4th Cruiser Division; Autonomous Naval Command Sicily
- Conflicts: Italo-Turkish War; World War I; Second Italo-Ethiopian War; World War II; Allied invasion of Sicily
- Awards: War Merit Cross; Military Order of Savoy; Order of the Crown of Italy; Order of Saints Maurice and Lazarus; Order of the German Eagle; Iron Cross Second Class

Pietro Barone (Modica, 9 April 1881 – Naples, 28 November 1975) was an Italian admiral during World War II. He was the naval commander of Sicily for most of the war.

== Biography ==
Born in Modica on April 9, 1881, he entered the Naval Academy of Livorno in 1899 and graduated in 1902 with the rank of ensign. In 1905 he was in the Far East with the protected cruiser Calabria; in 1911-1912, with the rank of lieutenant, he was military commander of the hired steamer Enrichetta during the Italo-Turkish War. During the First World War he was commander of torpedo boats (10 PN, 54 AS, Procione) and received a War Merit Cross.

During the 1920s he held various command positions on land and at sea, including the direction of the surveillance office in the Armstrong plants in Naples, the command of the Saseno naval detachment, the direction of the technical office in Pola and the command of the CREM depot of Taranto. After promotion to captain, in the 1930s he was in command of the heavy cruiser Pola and later became Chief of Staff of the Naval Department of Naples, before assuming command of the Arsenal of Taranto.

During the Second Italo-Ethiopian War he was superior naval commander in East Africa, with the rank of rear admiral, upgrading the port of Massawa to receive the huge influx of troops and supplies from Italy, an activity for which he received the Knight's Cross of the Military Order of Savoy. He was later promoted to vice admiral, receiving command of the 4th Cruiser Division (with flag on Giovanni delle Bande Nere and later on Alberto Di Giussano) in 1937-1938.

From 1939 to 1943 he was commander of the Autonomous Naval Command of Sicily, with headquarters in Messina, being promoted to admiral. For his activity in the convoy war in the Strait of Sicily he was awarded the decoration of Officer of the Military Order of Savoy, the Order of the German Eagle and of the Iron Cross Second Class. In August 1943, in the final stages of the Allied invasion of Sicily, he organized the evacuation of the surviving Italian troops, leaving Messina before it was occupied by the Allied forces. After the armistice of Cassibile he remained loyal to the royal government, assuming the position of undersecretary and then general director of the Merchant Navy from September 1943 to May 1944, after which he was discharged from active service.

He died in Naples on November 28, 1975.
