= Semovente da 47/32 =

Semovente L40 da 47/32
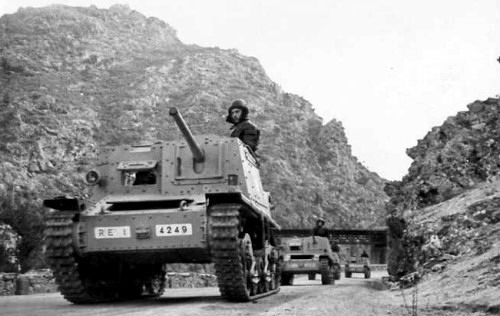
- Semovente da 47/32
- Type: Self-propelled gun
- Place of origin: Kingdom of Italy

Service history
- In service: 1942–45
- Used by: Kingdom of Italy; Nazi Germany; Independent State of Croatia
- Wars: World War II

Production history
- No. built: 402 (282 before armistice and 120 afterwards)
- Variants: Carro comando plotone Carro comando compagnia

Specifications
- Mass: 6.5 t (14,000 lb)
- Length: 3.820 m (150.4 in)
- Width: 1.860 m (73.2 in)
- Height: 1.690 m (66.5 in)
- Crew: 3 (commander, driver, loader)
- Armour: Front: 30 mm (1.2 in); Sides: 14.5 mm (0.57 in); Floor: 6 mm (0.24 in)
- Main armament: 1 × 47 mm Cannone da 47/32 AT gun 70 rounds
- Engine: SPA 18 VT I4 4,053 cc petrol 68 hp (51 kW) at 2,500 rpm
- Ground clearance: 40 cm (16 in)
- Operational range: 200 km (120 mi)
- Maximum speed: 42 km/h (26 mph) on road 25 km/h (16 mph) off-road

The Semovente L40 da 47/32 was an Italian self-propelled gun built during World War II.

== Design and history ==
The Semovente da 47/32 was created by mounting a Cannone da 47/32 anti-tank gun in an open-topped, box-like superstructure on a L6/40 light tank chassis. Some were built as command tanks with a radio installed instead of the main gun. An 8 mm machine gun disguised as the 47 mm main gun was used on these versions to make them look like a regular Semovente 47/32s. About 400 Semoventi da 47/32 were built from 1941 onward. The Semovente da 47/32 was the most heavily armed Italian armoured fighting vehicle used on the Eastern Front.

While the 47 mm gun was adequate for 1941, by the time the Semovente reached the field it was already outdated and ineffective against enemy medium tanks, and therefore the vehicle was not particularly successful.

After the Italian armistice in September 1943, the German Army took all Semovente 47/32s they could get hold of for their own use. The German designation was StuG L6 mit 47/32 630(i). Some of these were provided to Germany's Croatian puppet state and the Slovene Home Guard.

== Variants ==
- Semovente L40 da 47/32: standard variant, carrying 70 rounds of ammunition in the hull and lacking a radio.
- Carro comando plotone per semovente da 47/32: platoon commander vehicle, equipped with a Marelli RF 1 CA radio set, at the expense of a reduced ammunition capacity (47 rounds). The main visual difference from the standard variant was a single radio aerial.
- Carro comando compagnia per semovente da 47/32: company commander vehicle, equipped with two radio sets—a Marelli RF 1 CA and a RF 2 CA. The main gun was removed to make room for the radio equipment; in its place there was an 8 mm Breda mod. 38 machine gun, disguised as a 47 mm gun. This variant had twin radio aerials as well as the mock gun barrel.
