= Obice da 105/14 =

Obice da 105/14 modello 17
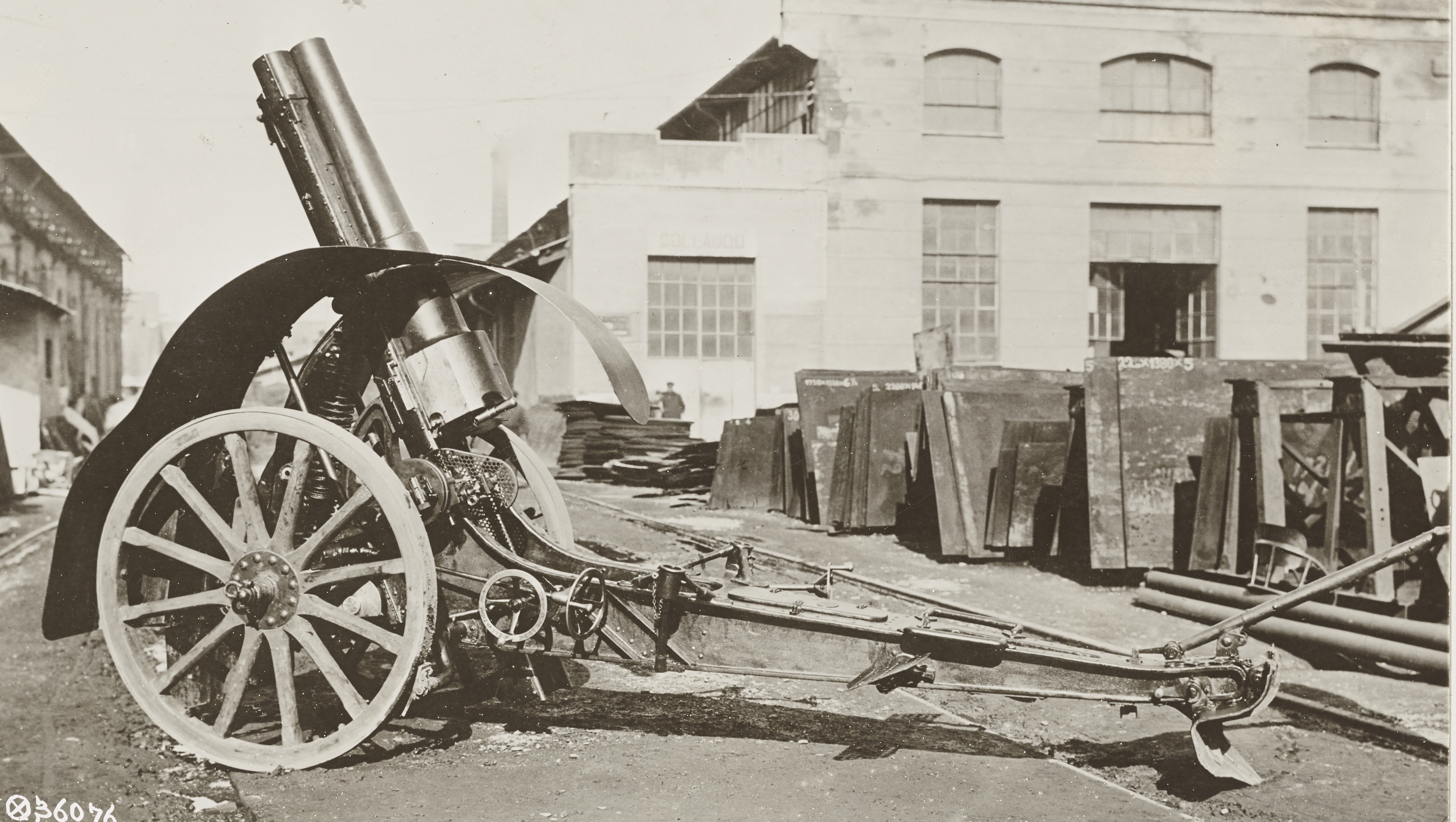
- Type: howitzer
- Place of origin: Italy

Service history
- In service: 1920–1945
- Used by: Italy; Nazi Germany
- Wars: World War II

Production history
- Designer: Schneider
- Manufacturer: Ansaldo

Specifications
- Mass: 1,400 kg (3,100 lb)
- Barrel length: 1.47 m (4 ft 10 in) L/14
- Shell: 16.3 kg (35 lb 15 oz)
- Caliber: 105 mm (4.134 in)
- Carriage: Box trail
- Elevation: −5° to +70°
- Traverse: 5°
- Rate of fire: 5–8 rpm
- Muzzle velocity: 330 m/s (1,083 ft/s)
- Maximum firing range: 8,160 m (8,920 yd)

The Obice da 105/14 modello 17 was a howitzer used by Italy during World War II. The howitzer was designed by Schneider in 1906. It was chosen by the Italian Regio Esercito to serve as their new field gun, but licence production by Ansaldo was slow. Some more were produced during the interwar years, but the captured Austrian Obice da 100/17 was generally considered to be superior.

It was originally designed to be towed by horses with wooden-spoked wheels. Some weapons may have been modernized for tractor-towing with steel-spoked wheels and pneumatic tires. For transport the box trail was supported by a small limber. Howitzers captured by the Germans after the Italian surrender in 1943 were given the designation of 10.5 cm leichte Feldhaubitze 326(i), although it is unknown to what extent they were actually used.

Both references listed below believe this gun was developed in the 1930s, but this seems unlikely given the photographic evidence of the designation as modello 17. The box trail would also be very old-fashioned for a gun designed that late.
