= Camillo Mercalli =

Italian general

- Born: 18 July 1882; Novi di Modena, Kingdom of Italy
- Died: 13 November 1974 (aged 92); Turin, Italy
- Military career
- Allegiance: Kingdom of Italy; Italy
- Branch: Royal Italian Army; Italian Army
- Rank: Lieutenant General
- Commands: 1st Infantry Division Superga; 26th Infantry Division Assietta; IV Corps; Armed Forces Command Albania; XXXI Corps
- Conflicts: Italo-Turkish War; Battle of Rhodes; World War I; World War II; Battle of the Western Alps; Greco-Italian War; Operation Baytown
- Awards: Silver Medal of Military Valor (twice); Bronze Medal of Military Valor; Military Order of Savoy; War Cross for Military Valor; Order of the Crown of Italy; Order of Saints Maurice and Lazarus

Camillo Mercalli (Savona, 18 July 1882 – Turin, 13 November 1974) was an Italian general during World War II.

== Biography ==
He was born in Savona on 18 July 1882, the son of Antonio Mercalli and Gabriella Marchesi Massimino, and after enlisting in the Royal Italian Army he participated in the Italo-Turkish War, where he was awarded a Bronze Medal of Military Valor for having distinguished himself during the battle of Psitos, in Rhodes, on May 16, 1912. He then fought during the First World War, where he was decorated with a War Cross for Military Valor.

Between 1919 and 1923 he was a tactical instructor at the Army War School in Turin. On 5 September 1934 he was promoted to the rank of Brigadier General, and became commander of the "Superga" Infantry Brigade. In 1937 he became Chief of Staff of the 1st Infantry Division "Superga", being promoted to Major General on 1 July of the same year; in 1938 he assumed command of the 26th Infantry Division Assietta. On 21 December 1939 he assumed command of the IV Corps, being promoted to Lieutenant General on 1 January 1940. He was at the head of the IV Corps, part of the 4th Army of General Alfredo Guzzoni, when Italy entered the Second World War.

With the IV Corps, Mercalli participated in the campaign against France, and then in the war against Greece, earning two Silver Medals of Military Valor for his behaviour during the Greek offensive in January and during the final Italian offensive in April 1941. He was then replaced by General Carlo Spatocco at the head of the IV Corps, and between 29 November 1941 and 30 September 1942 he held the position of commander-in-chief of the Italian Armed Forces in Albania, with headquarters in Tirana. From 1 October 1942 he was replaced by General Lorenzo Dalmazzo and returned to Italy, where in December he assumed the post of commander of the XXXI Army Corps with headquarters in Soveria Mannelli, operating within the 7th Army of General Mario Arisio. The XXXI Corps was tasked with the defense of Calabria and was composed of the 104th Infantry Division Mantova and of four coastal divisions (211th, 212th, 213th and 214th).

On 5 September 1943, after the British landings in Calabria, Mercalli studied a counterattack aimed at repelling the Allied forces and maintain possession of the Aspromonte, but this could not be carried out due to the order issued by Field Marshal Albert Kesselring to the 15th Panzergrenadier Division to withdraw to Castrovillari in order to counter an expected allied landing in the Gulf of Taranto. After the proclamation of the Armistice of Cassibile three days later, Mercalli remained loyal to the royalist government and made contact with the advancing Allied forces in Calabria; from December 1943 he became president of the Supreme Military Tribunal for liberated territories, and from July 1944, he was attached to the Ministry of War, remaining there until July 18, 1955, when he was discharged from the Army.

He died in Turin on November 13, 1974.
