= Allied invasion of Italy order of battle =

Phase of the Mediterranean Theater of World War II

The Allied invasion of Italy, a phase of the Mediterranean Theater of World War II, took place on 3 September at Reggio di Calabria (Operation Baytown), and on 9 September 1943 at Taranto and Salerno (Operation Slapstick and Operation Avalanche respectively). Allied naval forces landed American and Commonwealth troops on the beaches of southern Italy where they faced resistance from Axis forces.

== Allied Forces ==
Theatre and army group commanders

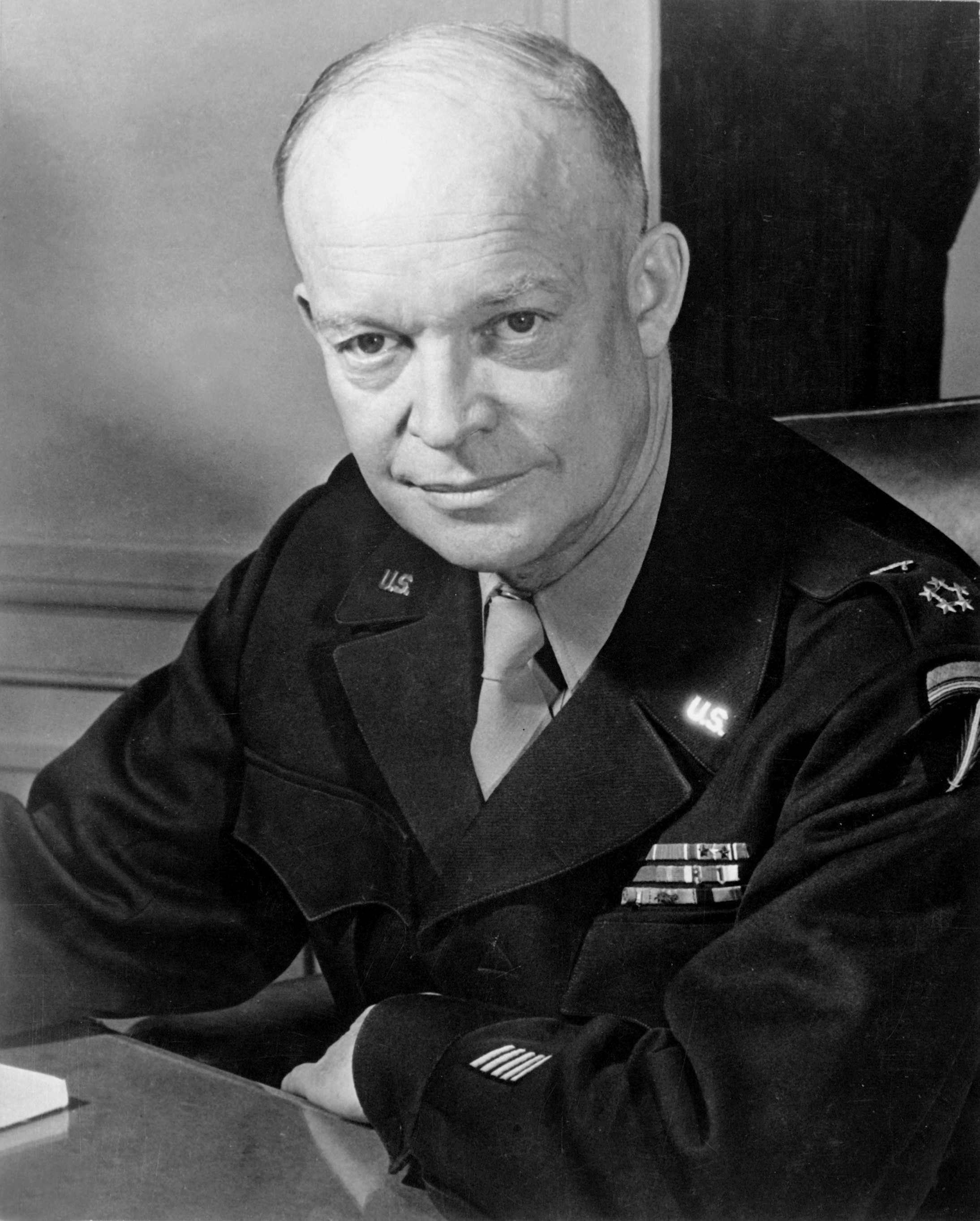
Dwight D. Eisenhower

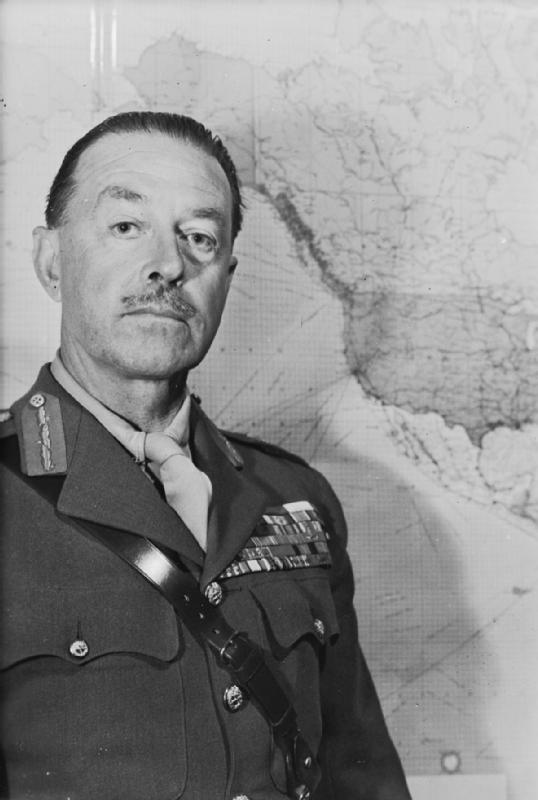
Sir Harold Alexander

Allied Forces Headquarters (AFHQ), Mediterranean
General Dwight D. Eisenhower

Ground forces

Allied 15th Army Group
General Harold Alexander

Naval forces

Allied Naval Forces, Mediterranean (Admiral Andrew Cunningham)

Western Task Force (Operation Avalanche) (Vice Admiral H. Kent Hewitt, USN)
Force H (Vice Admiral Sir Algernon Willis, RN)
Naval Task Force, Operation Slapstick (Vice Admiral Arthur Power, RN)

Air forces

Mediterranean Air Command (Allied) (Air Chief Marshal Sir Arthur Tedder) (Note: Headquarters at Algiers, Algeria)

=== Operation Baytown – 3 September ===
Landings across Strait of Messina

==== British Eighth Army ====
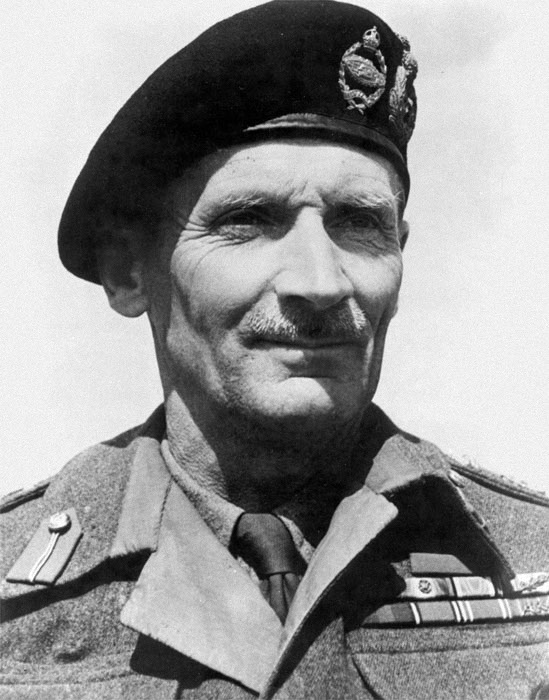
Sir Bernard Law Montgomery

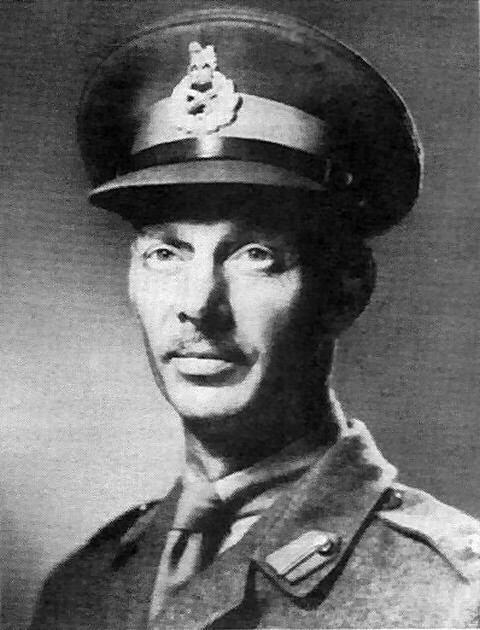
Sir Miles Dempsey

General Bernard Law Montgomery

===== British XIII Corps =====
Lieutenant-General Sir Miles Dempsey

Corps troops

1st Special Reconnaissance Squadron
No. 3 Commando
No. 40 (Royal Marine) Commando

Corps artillery

6th Army Group, Royal Artillery
2nd Anti-Aircraft Brigade

Also supporting XIII Corps

5th Army Group, Royal Artillery
XXX Corps Artillery

British 5th Infantry Division
Major-General Gerard Bucknall

13th Infantry Brigade (Brigadier L.M. Campbell)

2nd Battalion Cameronians (Scottish Rifles)
2nd Battalion Royal Inniskilling Fusiliers
2nd Battalion Wiltshire Regiment

15th Infantry Brigade (Brigadier E.O. Martin)

1st Battalion Green Howards
1st Battalion King's Own Yorkshire Light Infantry
1st Battalion, York and Lancaster Regiment

17th Infantry Brigade (Brigadier Dudley Ward)

2nd Battalion Royal Scots Fusiliers
2nd Battalion Northamptonshire Regiment
6th Battalion Seaforth Highlanders

Divisional troops

7th Battalion, Cheshire Regiment (Machine Gun Battalion)
5th Reconnaissance Regiment, Reconnaissance Corps
91st (4th London) Field Regiment, Royal Artillery
92nd (5th London) Field Regiment, Royal Artillery
156th (Lanarkshire Yeomanry) Field Regiment, Royal Artillery
52nd (6th London) Anti-Tank Regiment, Royal Artillery
18th Light Anti-Aircraft Regiment, Royal Artillery

38th Field Company, Royal Engineers
245th Field Company, Royal Engineers
252nd Field Company, Royal Engineers
254th Field Park Company, Royal Engineers

Canadian 1st Infantry Division
Major-General Guy Simonds

1st Infantry Brigade (Brigadier Howard Graham)

The Royal Canadian Regiment
1st Battalion, The Hastings and Prince Edward Regiment
1st Battalion, 48th Highlanders of Canada

2nd Canadian Infantry Brigade (Brigadier Chris Vokes)

Princess Patricia's Canadian Light Infantry
1st Battalion, The Seaforth Highlanders of Canada
1st Battalion, The Loyal Edmonton Regiment

3rd Canadian Infantry Brigade (Brigadier M.H.S. Penhale)

Royal 22^{e} Régiment
1st Battalion, The Carleton and York Regiment
1st Battalion, The West Nova Scotia Regiment

1st Canadian Armoured Brigade (Brigadier R.A. Wyman)

11th Armoured Regiment (The Ontario Regiment)
12th Armoured Regiment (Three Rivers Regiment)
14th Armoured Regiment (The Calgary Regiment)

Divisional troops

4th Reconnaissance Regiment (4th Princess Louise Dragoon Guards)
1st Infantry Division Support Battalion (The Saskatoon Light Infantry) (Machine Gun Battalion)
1st Field Regiment, Royal Canadian Horse Artillery
2nd Field Regiment, Royal Canadian Artillery
3rd Field Regiment, Royal Canadian Artillery
1st Anti-Tank Regiment, Royal Canadian Artillery
1st Light Anti-Aircraft Regiment, Royal Canadian Artillery
1st Field Company, Royal Canadian Engineers
3rd Field Company, Royal Canadian Engineers
4th Field Company, Royal Canadian Engineers
2nd Field Park Company, Royal Canadian Engineers

British 231st Infantry Brigade Group (Brigadier Roy Urquhart)

2nd Battalion Devonshire Regiment
1st Battalion Hampshire Regiment
1st Battalion Dorsetshire Regiment
165th Field Regiment, Royal Artillery
295th Field Company, Royal Engineers

=== Operation Slapstick – 9 September ===
Landings at Taranto

==== British Eighth Army ====
General Sir Bernard Law Montgomery

British 1st Airborne Division

Major-General George F. Hopkinson killed in action 9 Sep,
then Major-General Ernest Down

1st Parachute Brigade (Brigadier G.W. Lathbury)

1st Parachute Battalion
2nd Parachute Battalion
3rd Parachute Battalion
16th (Parachute) Field Ambulance

2nd Parachute Brigade (Brigadier Ernest Down)

4th Parachute Battalion
5th Parachute Battalion
6th Parachute Battalion
127th (Parachute) Field Ambulance

4th Parachute Brigade (Brigadier J.W. Hackett)

10th Parachute Battalion
11th Parachute Battalion
156th Parachute Battalion
133rd (Parachute) Field Ambulance

1st Airlanding Brigade (Brigadier Pip Hicks)

1st Battalion Border Regiment
2nd Battalion South Staffordshire Regiment
181st (Airlanding) Field Ambulance

Glider Pilot Regiment

=== Operation Avalanche – 9 September ===
Landings at Salerno

==== US Fifth Army ====
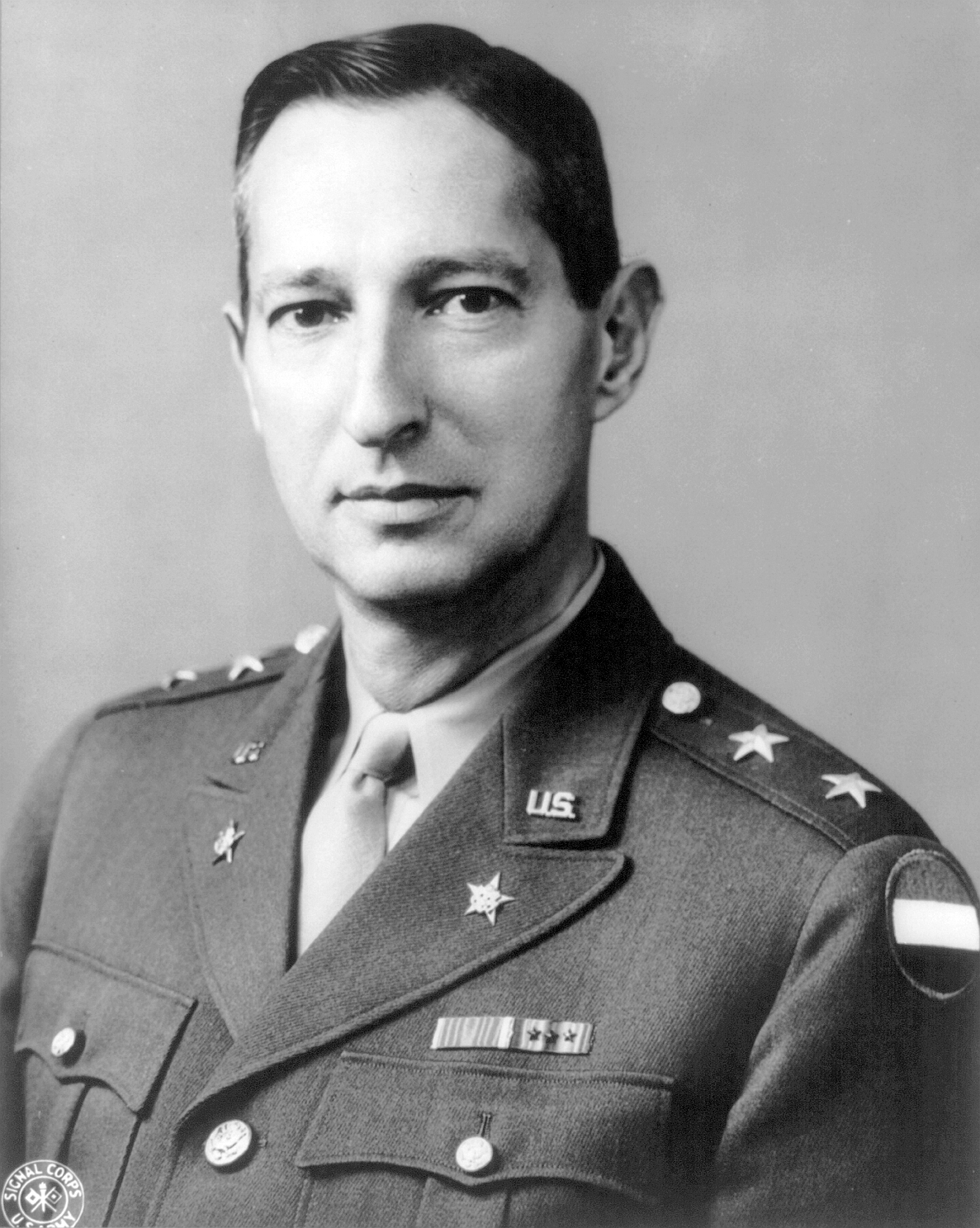
Mark W. Clark

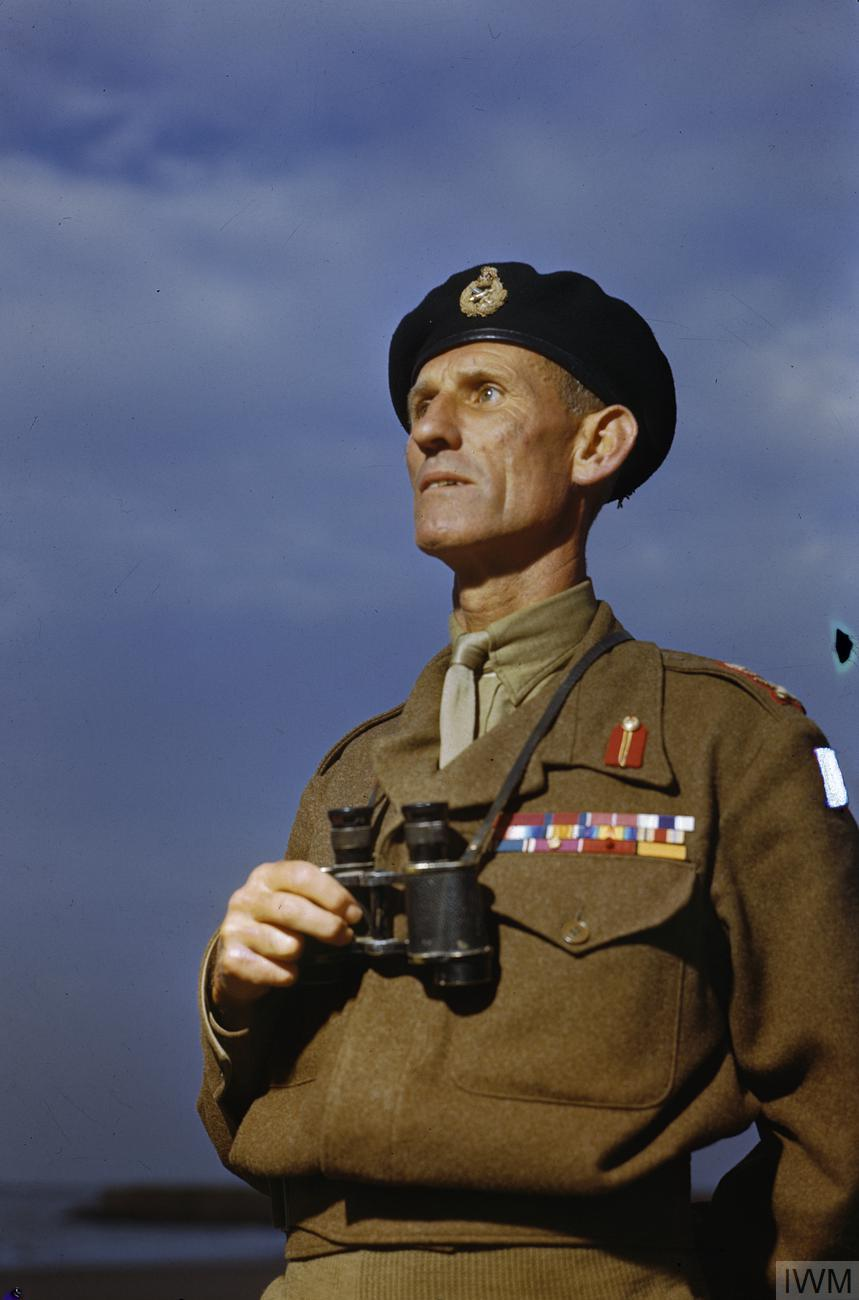
Richard L. McCreery

Lieutenant General Mark W. Clark

Army Group Reserve (Note: Available to Fifth Army)

US 82nd Airborne ("All-American") Division
Major General Matthew B. Ridgway

504th Parachute Infantry Regiment
505th Parachute Infantry Regiment
325th Glider Infantry Regiment

US 1st Armored ("Old Ironsides") Division (Note: 1st Armored Division was in Morocco being reorganized in the new "light armored division" organization. It began to arrive at Naples on 28 October 1943 and thus was not in the Army Group reserve for the landings in Italy.)
Major General Ernest N. Harmon

===== British X Corps =====
Lieutenant-General Richard L. McCreery

Northern landing beaches

Corps troops

Royal Scots Greys (Sherman tanks, attached to 56th Division)
40th Royal Tank Regiment (attached to British 46th Infantry Division)

British Special Service Brigade (Brigadier Robert Laycock)

No. 2 (Army) Commando
No. 41 (Royal Marine) Commando

US Ranger Force (Lieutenant Colonel William O. Darby) (Note: Under British X Corps for this operation.)

1st Ranger Battalion
3rd Ranger Battalion
4th Ranger Battalion

British 46th Infantry Division
Major-General John Hawkesworth

128th (Hampshire) Infantry Brigade (Brigadier M.A. James)

2nd Battalion, Hampshire Regiment
1/4th Battalion, Hampshire Regiment
5th Battalion, Hampshire Regiment

138th Infantry Brigade (Brigadier G.P. Harding)

6th Battalion, Lincolnshire Regiment
2/4th Battalion, King's Own Yorkshire Light Infantry
6th Battalion, York and Lancaster Regiment

139th Infantry Brigade (Brigadier R.E.H. Stott)

2/5th Battalion, Leicestershire Regiment
5th Battalion, Sherwood Foresters
16th Battalion, Durham Light Infantry

Divisional Troops

2nd Battalion, Royal Northumberland Fusiliers (Machine Gun Battalion)
46th Reconnaissance Regiment, Reconnaissance Corps
70th Field Regiment, Royal Artillery
71st Field Regiment, Royal Artillery
172nd Field Regiment, Royal Artillery
58th Anti-Tank Regiment, Royal Artillery
5th Medium Regiment, Royal Artillery
115th Light Anti-Aircraft Regiment, Royal Artillery

270th Field Company, Royal Engineers
271st Field Company, Royal Engineers
272nd Field Company, Royal Engineers
273rd Field Park Company, Royal Engineers

56th (London) Infantry Division
Major-General Douglas Graham

167th (London) Infantry Brigade (Brigadier C.E.A. Firth)

8th Battalion, Royal Fusiliers
9th Battalion, Royal Fusiliers
7th Battalion, Oxfordshire and Buckinghamshire Light Infantry

169th (London) Infantry Brigade (Brigadier L.O. Lyne)

2/5th Battalion, Queen's Royal Regiment (West Surrey)
2/6th Battalion, Queen's Royal Regiment (West Surrey)
2/7th Battalion, Queen's Royal Regiment (West Surrey)

201st Guards Brigade (Brigadier J.A. Gascoigne)

6th Battalion, Grenadier Guards
3rd Battalion, Coldstream Guards
2nd Battalion, Scots Guards

Divisional Troops

6th Battalion, Cheshire Regiment (Machine Gun Battalion)
44th Reconnaissance Regiment, Reconnaissance Corps
64th Field Regiment, Royal Artillery
65th Field Regiment, Royal Artillery
113th Field Regiment, Royal Artillery
67th Anti-Tank Regiment, Royal Artillery
69th Medium Regiment, Royal Artillery
57th Heavy Anti-Aircraft Regiment, Royal Artillery
100th Light Anti-Aircraft Regiment, Royal Artillery

220th Field Company, Royal Engineers
221st Field Company, Royal Engineers
42nd Field Company, Royal Engineers
563rd Field Park Company, Royal Engineers

British 7th Armoured Division
Major-General George Erskine

22nd Armoured Brigade (Brigadier W.R.N. Hinde)

1st Royal Tank Regiment
5th Royal Tank Regiment
4th County of London Yeomanry (Sharpshooters)
1st Battalion, Rifle Brigade (Prince Consort's Own)

131st Infantry Brigade (Brigadier Lashmer Whistler)

1/5th Battalion, Queen's Royal Regiment (West Surrey)
1/6th Battalion, Queen's Royal Regiment (West Surrey)
1/7th Battalion, Queen's Royal Regiment (West Surrey)

Divisional Troops

11th Hussars
3rd Regiment, Royal Horse Artillery
5th Regiment, Royal Horse Artillery
146th Field Battery, Royal Artillery
65th Anti-Tank Regiment, Royal Artillery
15th Light Anti-Aircraft Regiment, Royal Artillery

4th Field Squadron, Royal Engineers
621st Field Squadron, Royal Engineers
143rd Field Park Squadron, Royal Engineers

===== US VI Corps =====
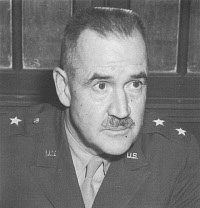
Ernest J. Dawley

Major General Ernest J. Dawley

Southern landing beaches

US 3rd Infantry ("Rock of the Marne") Division
Major General Lucian K. Truscott (Note: Did not take part in initial landings)

7th Infantry Regiment
15th Infantry Regiment
30th Infantry Regiment
HHB 3rd DIVARTY

9th Field Artillery Battalion
10th Field Artillery Battalion
39th Field Artillery Battalion
41st Field Artillery Battalion

3rd Reconnaissance Troop
10th Engineer Combat Battalion
3rd Medical Battalion
Headquarters, 3rd Special Troops

HHC, 3rd Infantry Division
703rd Ordnance Light Maintenance Company
3rd Signal Company
3rd Quartermaster Company

US 34th Infantry ("Red Bull") Division (Note: Did not take part in initial landings)
Major General Charles W. Ryder

133rd Infantry Regiment
135th Infantry Regiment
168th Infantry Regiment

US 36th Infantry ("Arrowhead") Division
Major General Fred L. Walker

141st Infantry Regiment
142nd Infantry Regiment
143rd Infantry Regiment

US 45th Infantry ("Thunderbird") Division
Major General Troy H. Middleton

157th Infantry Regiment
179th Infantry Regiment
180th Infantry Regiment

== Axis Forces ==
=== Army Command South ===
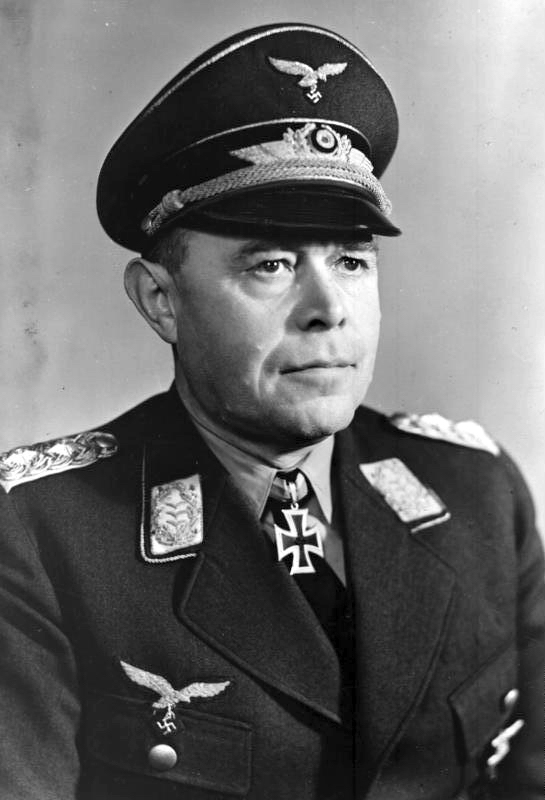
Albert Kesselring

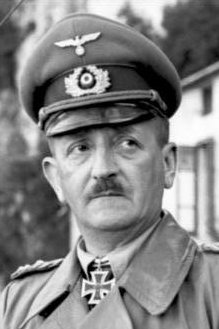
Heinrich von Vietinghoff

Generalfeldmarschall Albert Kesselring

==== Armeeoberkommando (AOK) 10 ====
Generaloberst Heinrich von Vietinghoff

XIV Panzer Corps

General der Panzertruppen Hermann Balck

Deployed along coast from north to south of Naples:
15th Panzergrenadier Division (Generalleutnant Eberhard Rodt)

Kampfgruppe Stroh

Panzer Division Hermann Göring (Generalmajor Wilhelm Schmalz) (Note: CO Generalleutnant Paul Conrath was on leave at the time of the Salerno landings.)

Kampfgruppe Haas
Kampfgruppe Becker

16th Panzer Division (Generalleutnant Rudolf Sieckenius) (Note: Absorbed the initial Allied assault)

Kampfgruppe Dörnemann
Kampfgruppe Stempel
Kampfgruppe von Holtey
Kampfgruppe von Doering

LXXVI Panzer Corps

General der Panzertruppen Traugott Herr

Deployed in Calabria and Apulia:
26th Panzer Division (Generalleutnant Smilo Freiherr von Lüttwitz)

Kampfgruppe (Note: CO unknown)

3rd Panzergrenadier Division (Generalleutnant Fritz-Hubert Gräser)

Kampfgruppe Moldenhaur

29th Panzergrenadier Division (Generalleutnant Walter Fries)

Kampfgruppe Ulich
Kampfgruppe Krüger

==== Italian 7th Army ====

Generale d'Armata Mario Arisio

XXXI Army Corps

Tenente Generale Camillo Mercalli

211th Coastal Division (Generale d'Brigata Felice Gonnella)

185th Paratroopers Regiment 'Nembo'

== Bibliography ==
=== Print ===
- Konstam, Angus (2013). Salerno 1943: The Allies invade southern Italy. Osprey Publishing. ISBN 978-1-78096-249-8.
- Molony, Brigadier C.J.C.; with Flynn, Captain F.C. (R.N.); Davies, Major-General H.L. & Gleave, Group Captain T.P. (2004) [1st. pub. HMSO:1973]. Butler, Sir James (ed.). The Mediterranean and Middle East. History of the Second World War, United Kingdom Military Series. Vol. V: The Campaign in Sicily 1943 and The Campaign in Italy 3rd September 1943 to 31st March 1944. Uckfield, UK: Naval & Military Press. ISBN 1-84574-069-6.

=== Web ===
- Houterman, Hans; Koppes, Jeroen. "World War II unit histories and officers". Archived from the original on 3 December 2008.
- "Orders of Battle.com". Archived from the original on 17 July 2007.
