= Army Group South (Italy) =

Army Group of Royal Italian Army in World War II

Army Group South (Italian: Gruppo d'Armate Sud) was an Army Group of the Royal Italian Army in World War II in 1940 and between 1942-1943 in central and southern Italy.

== History ==
It was established in Rome on 8 June 1940 and controlled the 3rd Army in continental southern Italy, as well as the XII Army Corps in Sicily, the XIII Army Corps in Sardinia, the XXVI Army Corps in Albania and some smaller units. One month later, after the end of the German western campaign and the defeat of France, the Army Group Command was dissolved again on 10 July 1940.

Army Group South was formed a second time on 15 April 1942. The Army Group Command then controlled the 5th, 6th and 7th Armies in central and southern Italy. On 10 July 1943, the Allies invaded Sicily, which had to be abandoned after 40 days of heavy fighting. During the subsequent Italian Campaign, fighting continued in Calabria, until the Armistice of Cassibile on 8 September 1943.
After the disarmament of the Italian forces by the Germans (Operation Achse), Army Group Command South was officially dissolved on 10 September 1943.

== Commanders ==
- Maresciallo d'Italia Emilio De Bono (1940-1940)
- Maresciallo d'Italia and heir to the throne Umberto di Savoia (1942-1943)

== Headquarters ==
- Rome (1940)
- Sessa Aurunca (1942–1943)
- Anagni (1943).
