= Mario Badino Rossi =

Italian general

- Born: 29 May 1887; Alessandria, Kingdom of Italy
- Died: 7 July 1965 (aged 78)
- Military career
- Allegiance: Kingdom of Italy
- Branch: Royal Italian Army
- Rank: Major General
- Commands: 13th "Cavallegeri di Monferrato" Regiment; 7th "Lancers of Milan" Regiment; 2nd Cavalry Division "Emanuele Filiberto Testa di Ferro"; 224th Coastal Division
- Conflicts: Italo-Turkish War; World War I; Battles of the Isonzo; World War II; Operation Anton; Italian occupation of France; Operation Achse
- Awards: Bronze Medal of Military Valor (twice); Order of Merit of the Italian Republic

Mario Badino Rossi (29 May 1887 – 7 July 1965) was an Italian general during World War II.

== Biography ==
Mario Badino Rossi entered the Military Academy of Modena on 14 September 1908 and graduated as a cavalry second lieutenant on 19 September 1909. He participated in the Italo-Turkish War and in the First World War with the rank of lieutenant and later captain, earning two Bronze Medals of Military Valor (one near Benghazi in 1912 and one on the Isonzo Front in 1916). On 1 January 1937 he was promoted to colonel and made commander of the 13th "Cavalleggeri di Monferrato" Regiment until 1939, and of the 7th "Lancers of Milan" Regiment from 1939 to 1940. From 1 July 1940, after promotion to brigadier general, he was attached to the Ministry of War for special assignments. On 15 November 1941, he assumed command of the newly established 202nd Coastal Division in western Sicily until early 1942, when he was replaced by General Luigi Sibille. In the summer of 1942 he became commander of the 2nd Cavalry Division "Emanuele Filiberto Testa di Ferro" in Ferrara, participating in the occupation of Provence in the following November. On 20 January 1943 he was promoted to major general and appointed Inspector of motorized troops; in July 1943 he was given command of the 224th Coastal Division in Nice, replacing General Luigi Mazzini. After the armistice of Cassibile he was ordered to assume the command of a defensive line stretching from the Authion massif to the Tête de Chien; he then reached the Col de Tende with his staff, where General Maurizio Lazzaro de Castiglioni tasked him with maintaining order on the mountain pass with the help of the Carabinieri, as the units of the Fourth Army retreated from France towards Italy.

After the war he wrote numerous publications on cavalry, horse training and horse riding. In 1956, he was made a Grand Officer of the Order of Merit of the Italian Republic.
