= 212th Coastal Division =

Royal Italian Army infantry division during World War II

- Active: 1942 – 1943
- Country: Kingdom of Italy
- Branch: Royal Italian Army
- Size: Division
- Garrison/HQ: Catanzaro
- Engagements: World War II

Insignia
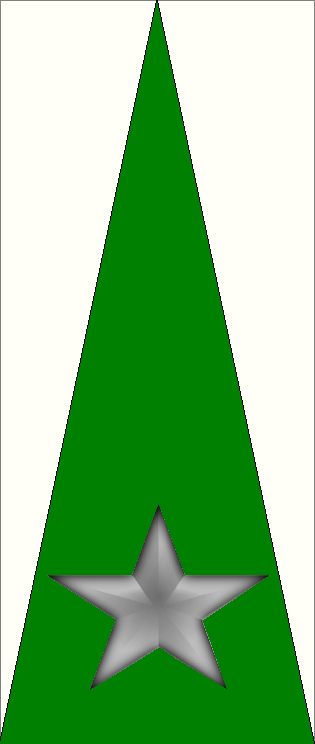
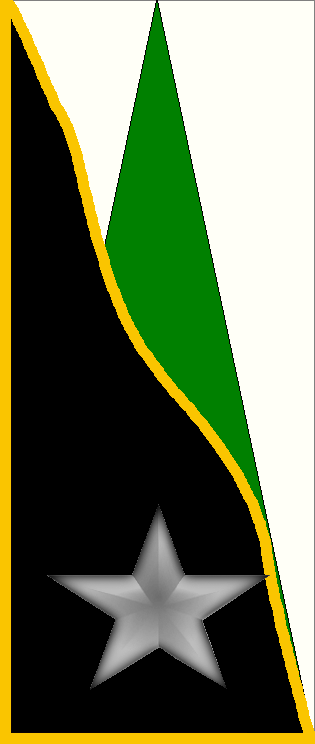
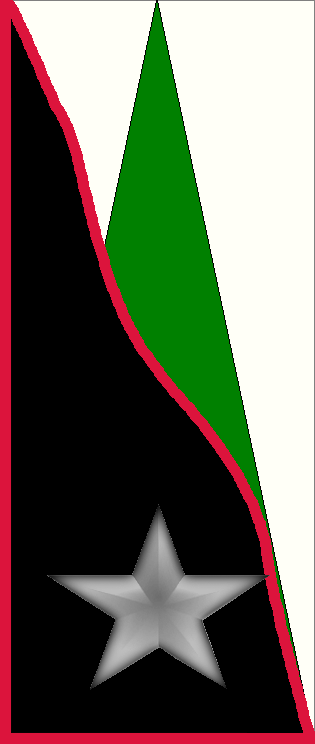
- Identification symbol: 212th Coastal Division gorget patches

The 212th Coastal Division (Italian: 212ª Divisione Costiera) was an infantry division of the Royal Italian Army during World War II. Royal Italian Army coastal divisions were second line divisions formed with reservists and equipped with second rate materiel. They were often commanded by officers called out of retirement.

== History ==
The division was activated on 15 November 1941 in Catanzaro by reorganizing the XII Coastal Sector Command. The division was assigned to XXXI Army Corps, which was responsible for the defense of southern Calabria. The division was responsible for the coastal defence of the coast of central Calabria: on the Tyrrhenian Sea side from Capo Vaticano to the outskirts of Serra d'Aiello, on the Ionian Sea side from Badolato to Cropani.

In early September 1943 the division prepared to fight the British XIII Corps, which had landed on 3 September 1943 in southern Calabria in Operation Baytown and was advancing towards the 212th Coastal Division's positions. After the Armistice of Cassibile was announced on 8 September 1943 the division remained at its positions and surrendered to the British XIII Corps. Afterwards the division joined the Italian Co-belligerent Army, but did not participate in the Italian campaign. The division was dissolved in summer 1944.

== Organization ==
- 212th Coastal Division, in Catanzaro
  - 103rd Coastal Regiment (transferred to the 214th Coastal Division on 1 July 1943)
    - CCCXLII Coastal Battalion
    - VI Dismounted Squadrons Group "Lancieri di Novara"
  - 115th Coastal Regiment
    - CCXVI Coastal Battalion
    - CCCXLVI Coastal Battalion
    - XII Dismounted Squadrons Group "Cavalleggeri di Alessandria"
  - 144th Coastal Regiment
    - CCX Coastal Battalion
    - CCCXLVII Coastal Battalion
    - VII Dismounted Squadrons Group "Lancieri di Firenze"
    - VIII Dismounted Squadrons Group "Lancieri di Aosta"
  - 45th Coastal Artillery Grouping
    - IX Coastal Artillery Group
    - XI Coastal Artillery Group
    - LXXXIX Coastal Artillery Group
    - CCVII Artillery Group (152/40 naval guns)
  - CVIII Machine Gun Battalion
  - 56th Anti-tank Company (47/32 mod. 35 anti-tank guns; transferred from the 56th Infantry Division "Casale")
  - 108th Mortar Company (81mm mod. 35 mortars)
  - 414th Mortar Company 81mm Mod. 35 mortars)
  - 212th Mixed Engineer Company
  - 189th Anti-paratroopers Unit
  - 320th Anti-paratroopers Unit
  - 321st Anti-paratroopers Unit
  - 324th Anti-paratroopers Unit
  - 443rd Anti-paratroopers Unit
  - 444th Anti-paratroopers Unit
  - 445th Anti-paratroopers Unit
  - 446th Anti-paratroopers Unit
  - 212th Carabinieri Section
  - 181st Field Post Office
  - Division Services

Attached to the division:

- DCIV Coastal Battalion
- Armored Train 152/3/T, in Crotone (4 × 152/40 naval guns, 4 × 20/77 Scotti anti-aircraft guns; transferred to the 214th Coastal Division on 1 July 1943)

== Commanding officers ==
The division's commanding officers were:

- Generale di Brigata Ugo Medori (15 November 1941 - 1 March 1942)
- Colonel Felice Pellegrini (acting, 2-13 March 1942)
- Generale di Brigata Ugo Medori (14 March 1942 - ?)
