= HM LST-8 =

1942 LST-1-class tank landing ship

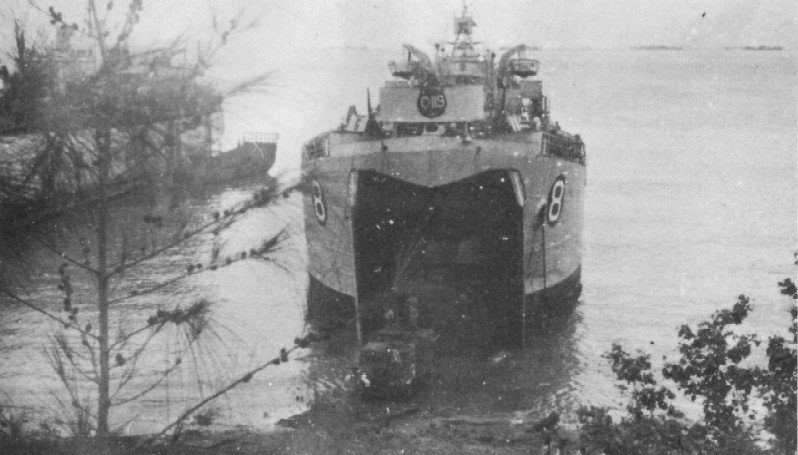
- HM LST-8 off-loading at Port Dickson, Malaya, 12 September 1945.

History
- Name: LST-8
- Builder: Dravo Corporation, Pittsburgh, Pennsylvania
- Laid down: 26 July 1942
- Launched: 29 October 1942
- Sponsored by: Mrs. Anne H. Johnson
- Fate: Transferred to the Royal Navy, 22 March 1943

United Kingdom
- Name: LST-8
- Acquired: 22 March 1943
- Commissioned: 23 March 1943
- Decommissioned: 4 May 1946
- Fate: Returned to US Naval custody, 1 June 1946

United States
- Acquired: 1 June 1946
- Stricken: 3 July 1946
- Fate: Sold for scrapping, 5 December 1947

General characteristics
- Type: LST-1-class tank landing ship
- Displacement: 4,080 long tons (4,145 t) full load; 2,160 long tons (2,190 t) landing
- Length: 328 ft (100 m) oa
- Beam: 50 ft (15 m)
- Draft: Full load: 8 ft 2 in (2.49 m) forward; 14 ft 1 in (4.29 m) aft; Landing at 2,160 t: 3 ft 11 in (1.19 m) forward; 9 ft 10 in (3.00 m) aft
- Installed power: 2 × 900 hp (670 kW) Electro-Motive Diesel 12-567A diesel engines; 1,700 shp (1,300 kW)
- Propulsion: 1 × Falk main reduction gears; 2 × Propellers
- Speed: 12 kn (22 km/h; 14 mph)
- Range: 24,000 nmi (44,000 km; 28,000 mi) at 9 kn (17 km/h; 10 mph) while displacing 3,960 long tons (4,024 t)
- Boats & landing craft carried: 2 or 6 x LCVPs
- Capacity: 2,100 tons oceangoing maximum; 350 tons main deckload
- Troops: 163
- Complement: 117
- Armament: Varied, ultimate armament; 1 × QF 12-pounder 12 cwt naval gun; 6 × 20 mm (0.79 in) Oerlikon cannon; 4 × Fast Aerial Mine (FAM) mounts

Service record
- Operations: Invasion of Sicily; Invasion of Reggio; Salerno landings; Anzio-Nettuno advanced landings; Invasion of Normandy; Invasion of Malaya

HM LST-8 was a Landing Ship, Tank of the Royal Navy during World War II. Built as a LST-1-class tank landing ship in the US, she was transferred to the Royal Navy in March 1943,

Post war she was returned to the United States Navy before disposal.

== Construction ==
LST-8 was laid down on 26 July 1942, at Pittsburgh, Pennsylvania, by the Dravo Corporation; launched on 29 October 1942; sponsored by Mrs. Anne H. Johnson; and transferred to the Royal Navy on 22 March 1943, and commissioned the following day.

== Service history ==
LST-8 sailed from Hampton Roads, Virginia, for the Mediterranean on 14 May 1943, with convoy UGS 8A, arriving in Oran, Algeria, sometime before 8 June 1943.

She participated in the invasion of Sicily, landings at Reggio, the Salerno landings, and the Anzio landings, in the Mediterranean Theatre and the Normandy landings in the European Theatre. She was refitted at Liverpool in September 1944, and was transferred to the Eastern Fleet. LST-8 also participated in the Operation Zipper landings in Malaya. She was paid off on 4 May 1946, at Subic Bay.

== Final disposition ==
The Royal Navy returned LST-8 to the US Navy on 1 June 1946, and the ship was struck from the Navy list on 3 July 1946. On 5 December 1947, she was sold to Bosey, Philippines, for scrapping.

== Bibliography ==
- "LST-8". Dictionary of American Naval Fighting Ships. Naval History and Heritage Command. This article incorporates text from this source, which is in the public domain.
- "LST-8". NavSource. 23 June 2006.
- "Convoy UGS.8A". Arnold Hague Convoy Database.
