= HM LST-9 =

1942 LST-1-class tank landing ship

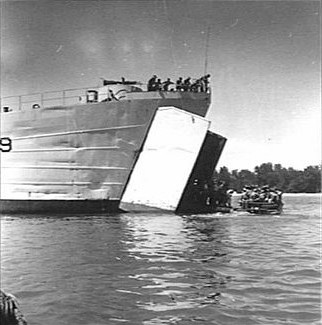
- HM LST-9 beached at Labuan Island, Northwest Borneo, 1 November 1945. Members of the Australian 2/17th Battalion disembarking into DUKWs which carried them to their new camp on Labuan. The battalion had been withdrawn from Seria.

History

United States
- Name: LST-9
- Builder: Dravo Corporation, Pittsburgh, Pennsylvania
- Laid down: 9 August 1942
- Launched: 14 November 1942
- Sponsored by: Mrs. Katherine Moxin
- Fate: Transferred to the Royal Navy, 19 March 1943

United Kingdom
- Name: LST-8
- Acquired: 19 March 1943
- Commissioned: 20 March 1943
- Decommissioned: 4 May 1946
- Fate: Returned to US 1 June 1946

United States
- Acquired: 1 June 1946
- Stricken: 5 September 1948
- Fate: Sold, 5 September 1948

General characteristics
- Type: LST-1-class tank landing ship
- Displacement: 1,625 long tons (1,651 t) (light); 4,080 long tons (4,150 t) (full (seagoing draft with 1,675 short tons (1,520 t) load); 2,366 long tons (2,404 t) (beaching)
- Length: 328 ft (100 m) oa
- Beam: 50 ft (15 m)
- Draft: Unloaded: 2 ft 4 in (0.71 m) forward; 7 ft 6 in (2.29 m) aft; Full load: 8 ft 2 in (2.49 m) forward; 14 ft 1 in (4.29 m) aft; Landing with 500 short tons (450 t) load: 3 ft 11 in (1.19 m) forward; 9 ft 10 in (3.00 m) aft
- Installed power: 2 × 900 hp (670 kW) Electro-Motive Diesel 12-567A diesel engines; 1,700 shp (1,300 kW)
- Propulsion: 1 × Falk main reduction gears; 2 × Propellers
- Speed: 12 kn (22 km/h; 14 mph)
- Range: 24,000 nmi (44,000 km; 28,000 mi) at 9 kn (17 km/h; 10 mph) while displacing 3,960 long tons (4,020 t)
- Capacity: 1,600–1,900 short tons (1,500–1,700 t) cargo
- Troops: 163
- Complement: 117
- Armament: Varied

Service record
- Operations: Invasion of Sicily; Invasion of Reggio; Invasion of Vibo Valentia; Normandy landings; Invasion of Malaya

HM LST-9 was a tank landing ship of the Royal Navy in World War II.

Built in the United States as a LST-1-class tank landing ship, she was transferred to the Royal Navy in March 1943. After serving in the Mediterranean, Normandy and the Far East, LST-9 was returned to the US Navy in June 1946.

== Construction ==
LST-9 was laid down on 9 August 1942, at Pittsburgh, Pennsylvania, by the Dravo Corporation; launched on 14 November 1942; sponsored by Mrs. Katherine Moxin; transferred to the Royal Navy on 19 March 1943, and commissioned the following day.

== Service history ==
LST-9 sailed from Hampton Roads, Virginia, for the Mediterranean on 14 May 1943, with convoy UGS 8A, arriving in Oran, French Algeria, sometime before 8 June 1943.

She participated in the invasion of Sicily, the landings at Reggio, the invasion of Vibo Valentia, and the Anzio landings in the Mediterranean theatre, and the Normandy landings in the European theatre.

She made 57 ferry trips across the Strait of Messina. LST-9 was refit at Leith, Scotland, from 11 April to 3 June 1944, setting out from Leith in time for the Normandy landings. On 25 January 1945, she collided with a jetty at the Port of Tilbury. In April 1945, she was at Antwerp, Belgium, for minor defect repairs before being refitted at Antwerp from May to June 1945.

LST-9 also participated in the Operation Zipper landings in Malaya. She was decommissioned on 4 May 1946, at Subic Bay, Philippines. LST-9 was returned to the US Navy on 1 June 1946, struck from the Navy list on 3 July 1946 and sold to Bosey, Philippines on 5 September 1948.

== Bibliography ==
- "LST-9". Dictionary of American Naval Fighting Ships. Naval History and Heritage Command. This article incorporates text from this source, which is in the public domain.
- "LST-9". NavSource. 9 June 2006.
- "Convoy UGS.8A". Arnold Hague Convoy Database.
