= XXXI Army Corps (Italy) =

The XXXI Army Corps (Italian: XXXI Corpo d'Armata) was a corps of the Royal Italian Army between 1941 and 1944.

== History ==
The XXXI Corps was created on 15 November 1941 in Catanzaro. Its task was to defend the coast of Calabria, the "toe" of Italy.

On 3 September 1943, the British Army launched Operation Baytown from Sicily, landing the XIII Corps on a bridgehead between Archi and Catona, in the extreme south of Calabria.
The German Command, correctly suspecting a more important attack further north, ordered not to oppose the invasion, but to withdraw while slowing down the advance of the British. The units of the XXXI Corps first settled on the Sinopoli - Bovalino line, and by 7 September had reached the area between Vibo Valentia and Badolato. After the signing of the Armistice of Cassibile, hostilities ceased and the Corps was overtaken by the advance of the British Army. The units of the XXXI Army Corps were assigned by the allies to control the coasts, ports and airports of Calabria.

On 15 July 1944, the XXXI Army Corps was disbanded, and replaced by the Military Command of Calabria.

== Composition (1943) ==
- 16th Infantry Division "Pistoia" (until September 1942)
- 104th Infantry Division "Mantova" (from January 1943)
- 211th Coastal Division (from 1942)
- 212th Coastal Division (from 1942)
- 227th Coastal Division (from early 1943)
- 214th Coastal Division (from August 1943)

== Commanders ==
- Mario Priore (15.11.1941 – 30.04.1942)
- Francesco Zingales (01.05.1942 – 10.10.1942)
- Felice Gonnella (10.10.1942 – 13.11.1942) (acting)
- Taddeo Orlando (13.11.1942 – 08.02.1943)
- Camillo Mercalli (11.02.1943 – 08.09.1943)
- Emilio Coronati (09.09.1943 - 15.07.1944)
