= 211th Coastal Division =

Royal Italian Army infantry division during World War II

- Active: 1942 – 1943
- Country: Kingdom of Italy
- Branch: Royal Italian Army
- Size: Division
- Garrison/HQ: Cittanova
- Engagements: World War II

Insignia
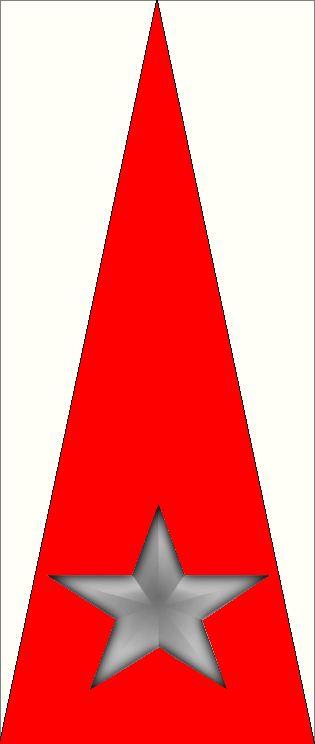
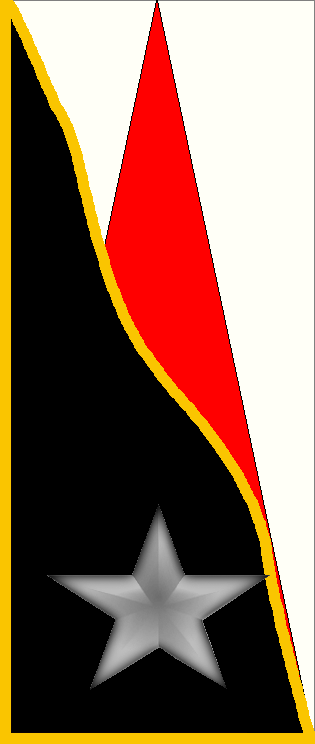
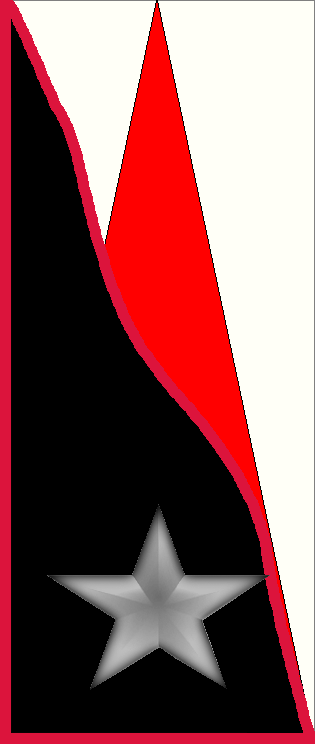
- Identification symbol: 211th Coastal Division gorget patches

The 211th Coastal Division (Italian: 211ª Divisione Costiera) was an infantry division of the Royal Italian Army during World War II. Royal Italian Army coastal divisions were second line divisions formed with reservists and equipped with second rate materiel. They were often commanded by officers called out of retirement.

== History ==
The division was activated on 15 November 1941 in Cittanova by reorganizing the XI Coastal Sector Command. The division was assigned to XXXI Army Corps, which was responsible for the defense of southern Calabria. The division was responsible for the coastal defence of southernmost part of the coast of Calabria: on the Tyrrhenian Sea side from Capo Vaticano to the outskirts of Scilla, on the Ionian Sea side from Capo dell'Armi to Badolato.

Between 3 and 8 September the division skirmished with troops of British XIII Corps, which had landed in southern Calabria in Operation Baytown. After the Armistice of Cassibile was announced the division remained at its positions and surrendered to the British XIII Corps. Afterwards the division joined the Italian Co-belligerent Army, but did not participate in the Italian campaign. The division was dissolved in summer 1944.

== Organization ==
- 211th Coastal Division, in Cittanova
  - 53rd Coastal Regiment
    - CCXII Coastal Battalion
    - XI Dismounted Squadrons Group "Lancieri Vittorio Emanuele II"
  - 118th Coastal Regiment
    - CCCXLVIII Coastal Battalion
    - CCCLVIII Coastal Battalion
    - IX Dismounted Squadrons Group "Lancieri di Aosta"
  - 143rd Coastal Regiment
    - CCCXXV Coastal Battalion
    - XV Dismounted Squadrons Group "Cavalleggeri di Palermo"
  - 49th Coastal Artillery Regiment
    - LVIII Coastal Artillery Group
    - LXXXIV Coastal Artillery Group
  - 534th Mortar Company (81mm mod. 35 mortars)
  - 211th Mixed Engineer Company
  - 327th Anti-paratroopers Unit
  - 448th Anti-paratroopers Unit
  - 211th Carabinieri Section
  - 180th Field Post Office
  - Division Services

Attached to the division:

- 185th Infantry Regiment "Nembo"
  - Command Company
  - III Paratroopers Battalion
  - VIII Paratroopers Battalion
  - XI Paratroopers Battalion
  - Cannons Company (47/32 mod. 35 anti-tank guns)
- DCCCXV Coastal Battalion
- DCCCXVI Coastal Battalion
- DCCCXL Coastal Battalion
- LVIII Guardia alla Frontiera Artillery Group
- CCIV Artillery Group
- Armored Train 120/1/S, in Siderno (4 × 120/45 Mod. 1918 naval guns, 4 × 20/77 Scotti anti-aircraft guns)

== Commanding officers ==
The division's commanding officers were:

- Generale di Brigata Francesco La Ferla (15 November 1941 - 17 September 1942)
- Generale di Brigata Felice Gonnella (18 September 1942 - ?)
