= 208th Coastal Division =

Royal Italian Army infantry division during World War II

- Active: 1941 – 1943
- Country: Kingdom of Italy
- Branch: Royal Italian Army
- Size: Division
- Engagements: World War II

Insignia
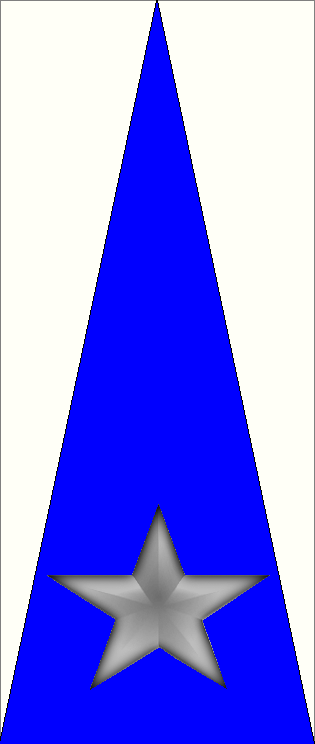
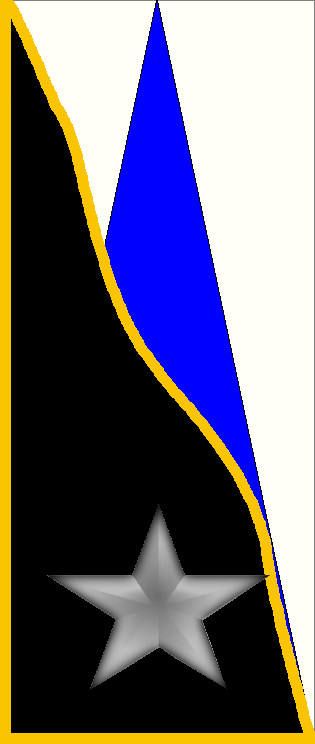
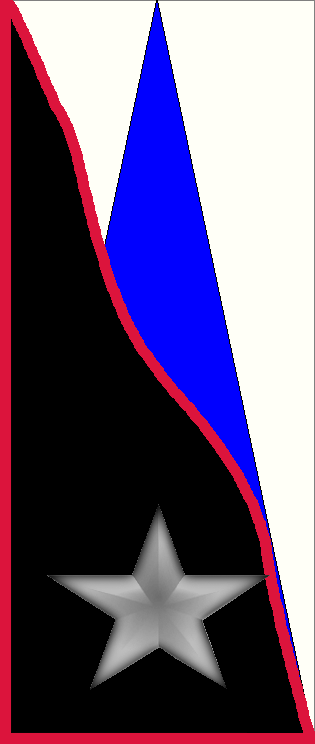
- Identification symbol: 208th Coastal Division gorget patches

The 208th Coastal Division (Italian: 208ª Divisione Costiera) was an infantry division of the Royal Italian Army during World War II. Royal Italian Army coastal divisions were second line divisions formed with reservists and equipped with second rate materiel. Recruited locally, they were often commanded by officers called out of retirement.

== History ==
The division was activated on 15 November 1941 in Palermo by reorganizing the VIII Coastal Sector Command. The division was assigned to XII Army Corps, which was responsible for the defense of the western half of the island of Sicily. The division was responsible for the coastal defense of the coast between, but excluding the cities of Palermo and Trapani.

The division fought against units of the American Seventh Army after the allies landed on Sicily on 10 July 1943. By 21 July 1943 the division had been severely decimated and was therefore officially declared lost due to wartime events.

In July 1943 the 208th division was commanded by General Giovanni Marciani, who doubled as commander of the Coastal Troops Command of XII Army Corps.

== Organization ==
- 208th Coastal Division
  - 133rd Coastal Regiment
    - LXI Replacements Battalion
    - CCXLIV Coastal Battalion
    - CDXXIII Coastal Battalion
    - CDXCVIII Coastal Battalion
  - 136th Coastal Regiment (became an autonomous unit responsible for the coast between Palermo and Santo Stefano di Camastra in July 1943)
    - CCCLXXX Coastal Battalion
    - CCCLXXXII Coastal Battalion
    - CDXIII Coastal Battalion
  - 147th Coastal Regiment (joined the division in July 1943)
    - CCCLXXVIII Coastal Battalion
    - CDXXXVIII Coastal Battalion
    - DXXXIX Coastal Battalion
  - 28th Coastal Artillery Regiment
    - XIX Coastal Artillery Group (105/28 cannons)
    - CXXIV Coastal Artillery Group (75/27 mod. 06 field guns)
    - CCXV Coastal Artillery Group (100/22 mod. 14/19 howitzers)
    - XLI Coastal Artillery Group (75/27 mod. 06 field guns and 105/28 cannons; transferred to the XXIX Coastal Brigade - Harbor Defense Command "N")
  - CV Machine Gun Battalion
    - 518th Machine Gun Company
    - 519th Machine Gun Company
    - 618th Machine Gun Company
    - 619th Machine Gun Company
  - 133rd Mixed Engineer Platoon
  - 208th Carabinieri Section
  - 165th Field Post Office
  - Division Services

Attached to the division:

- Armored Train 152/1/T, in Termini Imerese (4 × 152/40 naval guns, 4 × 20/77 Scotti anti-aircraft guns)
- Armored Train 152/2/T, in Carini (4 × 152/40 naval guns, 4 × 20/77 Scotti anti-aircraft guns)

== Commanding officers ==
The division's commanding officers were:

- Generale di Divisione Gaetano Binacchi (15 November 1941 - 27 April 1943)
- Generale di Divisione Giovanni Marciani (28 April 1943 - 21 July 1943, POW)
