= 214th Coastal Division =

Royal Italian Army infantry division during World War II

- Active: 1943 – 1944
- Country: Kingdom of Italy
- Branch: Royal Italian Army
- Size: Division
- Garrison/HQ: Santa Severina
- Engagements: World War II

Insignia
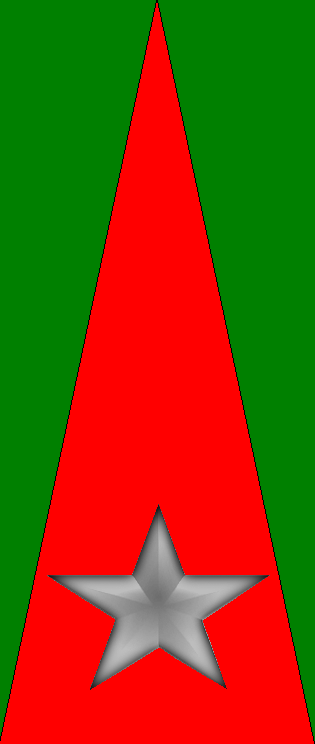
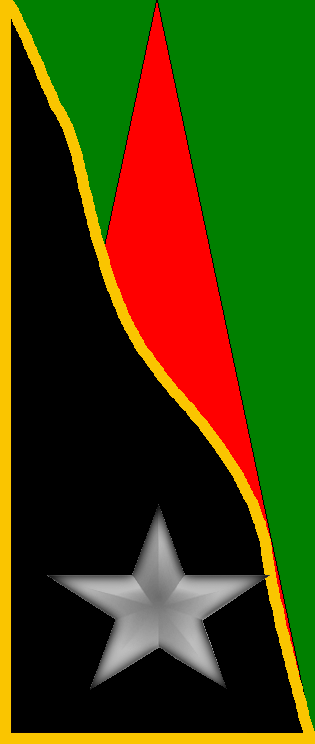
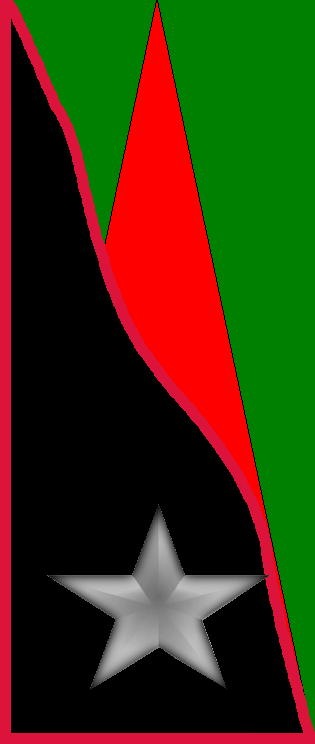
- Identification symbol: 214th Coastal Division gorget patches

The 214th Coastal Division (Italian: 214ª Divisione Costiera) was an infantry division of the Royal Italian Army during World War II. Royal Italian Army coastal divisions were second line divisions formed with reservists and equipped with second rate materiel. They were often commanded by officers called out of retirement.

== History ==
The division was activated on 1 July 1943 in Bari and received units from the 212th Coastal Division and XXXI Coastal Brigade. The division was assigned to XXXI Army Corps and had its headquarter in Santa Severina. The division was responsible for the coastal defense of the coast of the Ionian Sea coast of Calabria between Botricello and Lido Sant'Angelo.

In early September the division prepared to fight the British XIII Corps, which had landed on 3 September 1943 in southern Calabria in Operation Baytown and was advancing towards the 214th Coastal Division's positions. After the Armistice of Cassibile was announced on 8 September 1943 the division remained at its positions and surrendered to the British XIII Corps. Afterwards the division joined the Italian Co-belligerent Army, but did not participate in the Italian campaign. The division was dissolved in summer 1944.

== Organization ==
- 214th Coastal Division, in Santa Severina
  - 103rd Coastal Regiment (transferred from the 212th Coastal Division)
    - CCCXLII Coastal Battalion
    - VI Dismounted Squadrons Group "Lancieri di Novara"
  - 148th Coastal Regiment
    - 3 × Coastal battalions
  - CCCXCVI Coastal Battalion
  - XXVII Coastal Artillery Group
  - LV Coastal Artillery Group
  - LXXXI Coastal Artillery Group
  - CXL Coastal Artillery Group
  - 403rd Mortar Company (81mm mod. 35 mortars)
  - 702nd Mixed Engineer Company
  - 178th Anti-paratroopers Unit
  - 312th Anti-paratroopers Unit
  - 443rd Anti-paratroopers Unit
  - 447th Anti-paratroopers Unit
  - 451st Anti-paratroopers Unit
  - 214th Carabinieri Section
  - Field Post Office
  - Division Services

Attached to the division:

- Armored Train 152/3/T, in Crotone (4 × 152/40 naval guns, 4 × 20/77 Scotti anti-aircraft guns; transferred from the 212th Coastal Division)

== Commanding officers ==
The division's commanding officers were:

- Generale di Brigata Carlo Lama (1 July 1943 - ?)
