= Gino Ficalbi =

Italian general

- Born: 21 April 1891
- Died: 1973 (age 82)
- Military career
- Allegiance: Kingdom of Italy
- Branch: Royal Italian Army
- Rank: Brigadier General
- Commands: 27th Infantry Regiment "Pavia"; 202nd Coastal Division
- Conflicts: World War I; Battles of the Isonzo; World War II; Allied invasion of Sicily
- Awards: Silver Medal of Military Valour

Gino Ficalbi (21 April 1891 – 1973) was an Italian general during World War II.

== Biography ==
He was born in 1891 and after enlisting in the Royal Italian Army, fought in World War I as a captain in the 8th Infantry Regiment, being wounded in action and awarded a Silver Medal of Military Valor during the fighting on the Bainsizza plateau in October 1917. In 1936 he was promoted to colonel and made commander of the 27th Infantry Regiment "Pavia".

In April 1942 he was promoted to brigadier general, assuming command of the infantry of the 4th Infantry Division Livorno, stationed in Sicily. On 1 April 1943 he assumed command of the 202nd Coastal Division, also stationed in Sicily and tasked with the defense of the coast between Sciacca and Mazara del Vallo.

In July 1943 the Division was destroyed during the Allied invasion of Sicily, and on 24 July Ficalbi was captured and taken to the Wilton Park Estate, England, where he was held as a prisoner of war until October 1944. He was then released and returned to service within the Italian Co-belligerent Army, becoming deputy commander of the Territorial Military Command of Florence.

He died in 1973.
