= Capo Vaticano Lighthouse =

Lighthouse in Calabria, Italy

Capo Vaticano
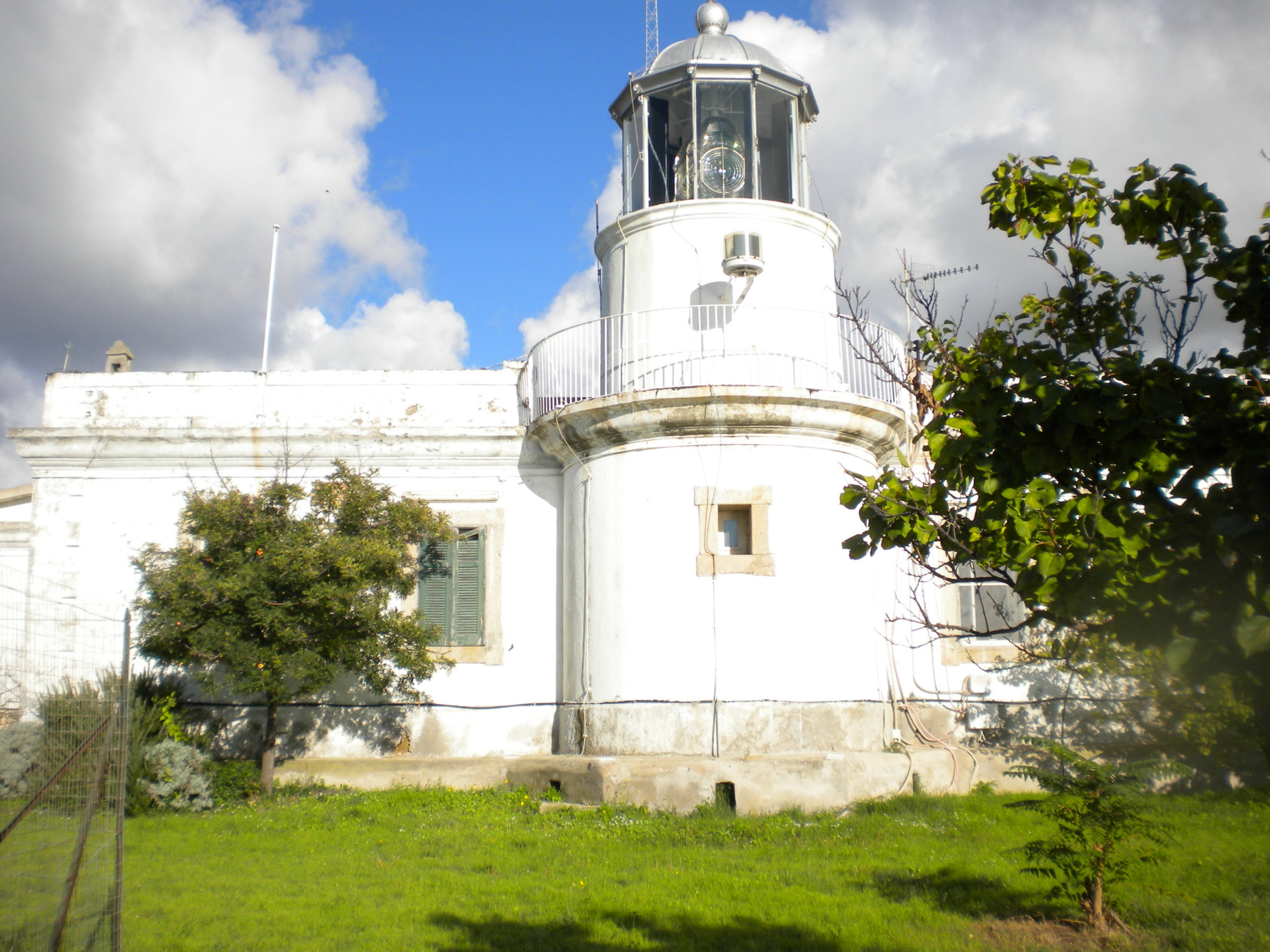
- Capo Vaticano Lighthouse in 2010
- Location: Capo Vaticano; Ricadi; Calabria; Italy
- Coordinates: 38°37′10″N 15°49′43″E

Tower
- Constructed: 1885
- Construction: masonry tower
- Height: 8 metres (26 ft)
- Shape: cylindrical tower with balcony and lantern
- Markings: white tower, metallic grey lantern dome
- Power source: mains electricity
- Operator: Marina Militare

Light
- Focal height: 108 metres (354 ft)
- Lens: type OR 500 focal length: 250 mm
- Intensity: AL 1000 W
- Range: main: 24 nautical miles (44 km; 28 mi) reserve: 18 nautical miles (33 km; 21 mi)
- Characteristic: Fl (4) W 20s.
- Italy no.: 2708 E.F.

Capo Vaticano Lighthouse (Italian: Faro di Capo Vaticano) is an active lighthouse located in Capo Vaticano, which is a Cape in the south western Calabria on the Tyrrhenian Sea.

== Description ==
The lighthouse was built in 1885 and consists of a white cylindrical tower, 8 metres (26 ft) high, with balcony and lantern attached to the front 1-storey white keeper's house. The lantern, painted in metallic grey, is positioned at 108 metres (354 ft) above sea level and emits four white flashes in a 20 seconds period, visible at 24 nautical miles (44 km; 28 mi) of distance. The lighthouse is fully automated and is operated by the Marina Militare and is identified by the code number 2708 E.F.

== See also ==
- List of lighthouses in Italy
- Capo Vaticano
