= 202nd Coastal Division =

Royal Italian Army infantry division during World War II

- Active: 1941 – 1943
- Country: Kingdom of Italy
- Branch: Royal Italian Army
- Size: Division
- Garrison/HQ: Castelvetrano
- Engagements: World War II

Insignia
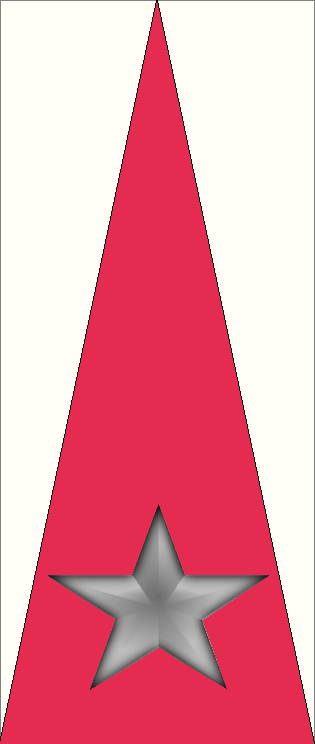
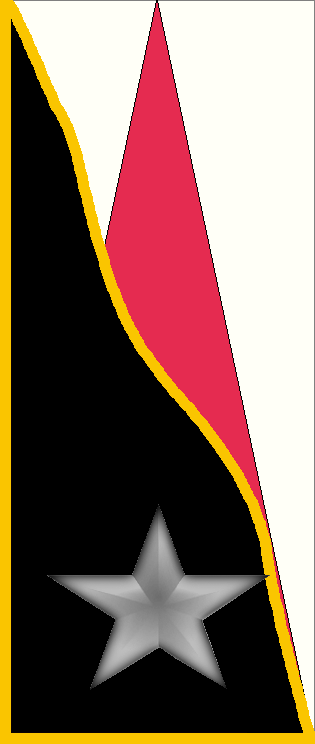
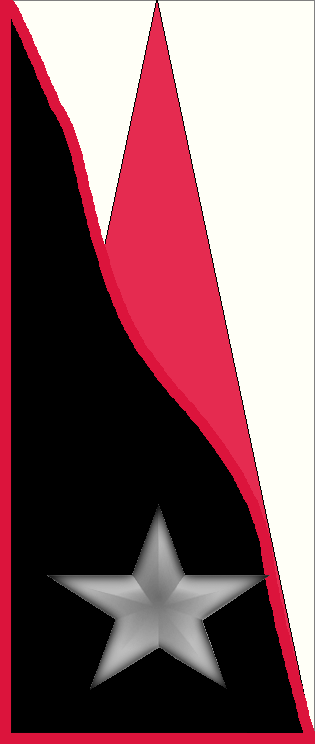
- Identification symbol: 202nd Coastal Division gorget patches

The 202nd Coastal Division (Italian: 202ª Divisione Costiera) was an infantry division of the Royal Italian Army during World War II. Royal Italian Army coastal divisions were second line divisions formed with reservists and equipped with second rate materiel. Recruited locally, they were often commanded by officers called out of retirement.

== History ==
The division was activated on 15 November 1941 in Palermo by reorganizing the II Coastal Sector Command. The division was assigned to XII Army Corps, which was responsible for the defense of the western half of the island of Sicily. In January 1942 the division moved its headquarter to Castelvetrano. The division was responsible for the coastal defense of the coast between Marsala and Sciacca. On 10 June 1943 the 202nd Coastal Division ceded some of its units to the newly formed 230th Coastal Division, which took over responsibility for the coast between Marsala and Mazara del Vallo, leaving the 202nd with the responsibility for the coast between Mazara del Vallo and Sciacca.

The 202nd Coastal Division fought against units of the American Seventh Army after the allies landed on Sicily on 10 July 1943. By 24 July 1943 the division had been severely decimated and was therefore officially declared lost due to wartime events.'

== Organization ==
- 202nd Coastal Division
  - 124th Coastal Regiment
    - CCCLXXVI Coastal Battalion
    - CCCLXXXVI Coastal Battalion
    - DXLIII Coastal Battalion
  - 142nd Coastal Regiment
    - CCCLXXVII Coastal Battalion
    - CDXVIII Coastal Battalion
    - CDXXVII Coastal Battalion
    - CDLXVI Coastal Battalion
    - CDXC Coastal Battalion
  - 62nd Coastal Artillery Regiment
    - LVI Cannons Group (105/32 heavy field guns)
    - LXXXVIII Coastal Artillery Group (149/35 heavy guns)
    - CXVIII Coastal Artillery Group (105/28 cannons)
    - CLXXII Coastal Artillery Group (105/28 cannons)
  - 63rd Coastal Artillery Regiment
    - LV Cannons Group (105/32 heavy field guns)
    - CXLI Coastal Artillery Group (75/27 mod. 06 field guns)
    - CXLIII Coastal Artillery Group (149/35 heavy guns)
    - CLVII Coastal Artillery Group (149/19 mod. 37 howitzers)
  - CIX Machine Gun Battalion
    - 509th Machine Gun Company
    - 637th Machine Gun Company
    - 638th Machine Gun Company
    - 645th Machine Gun Company
  - 120th Mixed Engineer Platoon
  - 124th Mixed Engineer Platoon
  - 202nd Carabinieri Section
  - 161st Field Post Office
  - Division Services

Attached to the division:

- Armored Train 76/3/T, in Mazara del Vallo (4 × 76/40 mod. 16 naval guns, 4 × 20/77 Scotti anti-aircraft guns)

== Commanding officers ==
The division's commanding officers were:

- Generale di Brigata Mario Badino Rossi (15 November 1941 - 4 September 1942)
- Generale di Divisione Luigi Sibille (5 September 1942 - 31 March 1943)
- Generale di Brigata Gino Ficalbi (1 April 1943 - 24 July 1943)
