= Mario Arisio =

Italian general

- Born: 5 July 1885; Turin, Kingdom of Italy
- Died: 7 July 1950 (aged 65); Rome, Italy
- Military career
- Allegiance: Kingdom of Italy
- Branch: Royal Italian Army
- Rank: General
- Commands: 231st Infantry Regiment; Central Infantry School; 39th Infantry Regiment; 19th Infantry Division Gavinana; 28th Infantry Division Aosta; 4th Infantry Division Livorno; 52nd Infantry Division "Torino"; III Army Corps; XII Army Corps; 7th Army
- Conflicts: Italo-Turkish War; World War I; Second Italo-Ethiopian War; World War II; Battle of the Western Alps; Greco-Italian War; Allied invasion of Sicily; Operation Baytown
- Awards: Silver Medal of Military Valour; Bronze Medal of Military Valour; Order of the Crown of Italy

Mario Arisio (5 July 1885 – 7 July 1950) was an Italian general who served in the Italo-Turkish War, World War I, the Second Italo-Ethiopian War and World War II.

== Biography ==
Arisio was born in Turin on July 5, 1885, and attending the Royal Military Academy of Modena he was appointed second lieutenant in 1906. He fought in Libya during the Italo-Turkish War in 1911-1912 and in counterguerrilla operations in 1913, and in the First World War from 1915 to 1918, where he earned a Bronze Medal of Military Valour.

In 1926 he was promoted to the rank of colonel, assuming in succession the commands of the 231st Regiment, of the Central Infantry School, and in 1934, of the 39th "Bologna" Infantry Regiment. On 11 March 1935 he became brigadier general, taking command of the XIX "Gavinana II" Infantry Brigade, and led this unit on the Eritrean Front during the Second Italo-Ethiopian War. After the end of the conflict he was repatriated along with his brigade, maintaining its command after the brigade was transformed into the 19th Infantry Division "Gavinana". On 1 January 1937 he was promoted to the rank of major general, and in the course of 1938 he assumed command of the 28th Infantry Division "Vespri", which in the course of 1939 was transformed into the 28th Infantry Division "Aosta". In the same year he was transferred to the command of the 4th Infantry Division Livorno and then of the 52nd Infantry Division "Torino".

When the Kingdom of Italy entered World War II on 10 June 1940, Arisio was in command of the III Corps deployed on the Alpine front on the border with France, on the Alta Roja-Gessi sector, operating within the 1st Army of General Pietro Pintor during the brief offensive against France in June 1940.
In November 1940, after the start of the Greco-Italian War, the Third Corps was transferred to the Albanian front, operating within the 9th Army of General Mario Vercellino (later replaced by General Alessandro Pirzio Biroli), where it fought until May 1941. In the course of the operations against Greece, Arisio went so far as to request that three Blackshirt battalions were repatriated, as they showed no fighting spirit. For his role in the final part of the campaign, he was awarded a Silver Medal of Military Valour.
On 1 July 1941 he was promoted to lieutenant general, assuming command of the XII Corps with headquarters in Palermo.

After the start of operations on the Eastern front and the establishment of the Italian Expeditionary Corps in Russia, Arisio's name was included in a shortlist of four generals (the others were Francesco Zingales, Giovanni Messe, Giovanni Magli), among whom Zingales was finally chosen as commander of the CSIR. On 10 October 1942 Arisio was awarded the title of Commander of the Military Order of Savoy.

When the Allies invaded Sicily on 10 July 1943, Arisio was still in command of the XII Corps located in western Sicily, which operated within the 6th Army of General Alfredo Guzzoni, but was only marginally involved in the initial fighting. On 12 July, only two days after the landings, Arisio was replaced by Francesco Zingales at the command of the XII Corps, and on 1 August he assumed command of the Seventh Army, replacing General Adalberto of Savoy-Genova, Duke of Bergamo. The army, which had its headquarters in Potenza, was composed of the XXXI Army Corps stationed in Calabria (General Camillo Mercalli), the XIX Corps stationed in Campania (General Riccardo Pentimalli) and the IX Corps stationed in Apulia (General Roberto Lerici). In early September his troops went into action against British forces, which had crossed the Strait of Messina and landed on the Calabrian coast in Operation Baytown. An early counterattack planned by the commander of the XXXI Army Corps, General Mercalli, aborted due to the retreat of the 29th Panzergrenadier Division of General Walter Fries who, obeying the orders of the Field Marshal Albert Kesselring, had moved to Castrovillari in order to cover the Gulf of Taranto from a possible Allied landing. Arisio immediately protested to the General Staff in Rome for Kesselring's behavior, but he was answered that German troops acted independently of Italian commands.

After the armistice of 8 September 1943 he ordered his troops not to oppose the Allies and to withdraw without fighting on the Pollino line, in order to avoid further losses among his men. Feeling betrayed and humiliated by the armistice, he assured the German command that he would continue to cooperate, giving the order to hand over heavy weapons so as to avoid the complete disarmament of his troops. At 00:00 on the 9th, however, he received detailed instructions from the General Staff of the Royal Army, which confirmed that hostilities against the Allies were suspended and ordered to react to hostile acts by the Germans, gather and keep ready for use all units that were not already assigned to specific tasks, and collect and concentrate all matériel. At 1:00 he therefore gave orders to this effect to the three dependent army corps (i.e. to counteract, even with the use of weapons, the disarmament attempts made by German troops) but left Potenza, moving to Francavilla Fontana along with much of his staff. On the 13th, German troops surrounded the headquarters of the Seventh Army, but there they only found Colonel Giovanni Faccin, the Deputy Chief of Staff of the army, who committed suicide rather than surrender. Arisio made contact with the advancing Allies and continued to hold command of the Seventh Army for some time after the armistice, officially leaving it on January 19, 1944.

He was discharged from the Army on 29 February 1948, and died in Rome in 1950.
