= 224th Coastal Division =

Royal Italian Army infantry division during World War II

- Active: 1943 – 1943
- Country: Kingdom of Italy
- Branch: Royal Italian Army
- Size: Division
- Garrison/HQ: Nice
- Engagements: World War II

Insignia
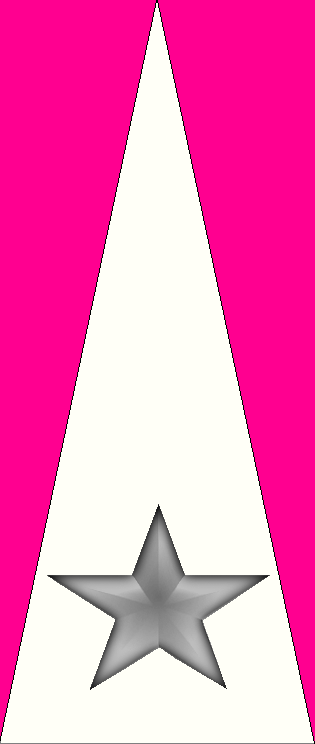
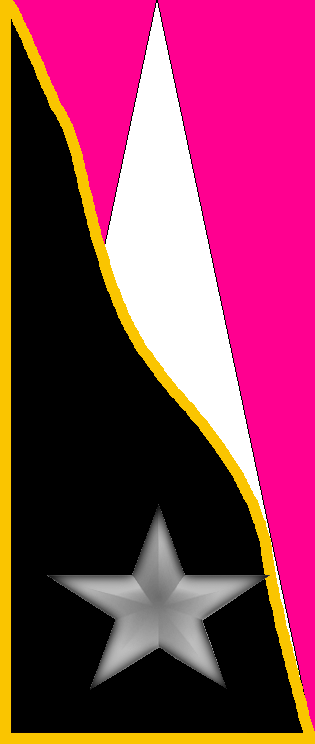
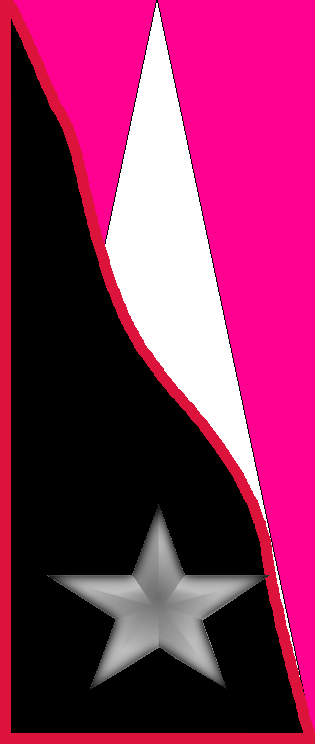
- Identification symbol: 224th Coastal Division gorget patches

The 224th Coastal Division (Italian: 224ª Divisione Costiera) was an infantry division of the Royal Italian Army during World War II. Royal Italian Army coastal divisions were second line divisions formed with reservists and equipped with second rate materiel. They were often commanded by officers called out of retirement.

== History ==
In November 1942 Axis forces invaded Southern France and divided it into a German and an Italian occupation zone. For the coastal defense of its zone Italy raised on 1 January 1943 the 223rd Coastal Division in Bologna and the 224th Coastal Division in Florence. Both divisions were formed with reserve units of the army's regular Alpini regiments.

The 224th Coastal Division was based in Nice and assigned to I Army Corps. After the announcement of the Armistice of Cassibile on 8 September 1943 the division was disbanded by invading German forces.

== Organization ==
- 224th Coastal Division - Military Base Nice, in Nice
  - 165th Coastal Alpini Regiment
    - Alpini Battalion "Monte Marmolada" (formed from the XXV Replacements Battalion, 7th Alpini Regiment)
    - Alpini Battalion "Monte Canin" (formed from the XXVI Replacements Battalion, 8th Alpini Regiment)
    - Alpini Battalion "Monte Clapier" (formed from the XXVII Replacements Battalion, 1st Alpini Regiment)
    - DXIII Mobile Territorial Alpini Battalion
    - 424th Mortar Company (81mm mod. 35 mortars)
  - X Carabinieri Battalion
  - 104th Bersaglieri Motorcyclists Company
  - 224th Mixed Engineer Company
  - 224th Carabinieri Section
  - 158th Field Post Office
  - Division Services

== Commanding officers ==
The division's commanding officers were:

- Generale di Divisione Luigi Mazzini (1 January 1943 - 25 May 1943)
- Generale di Divisione Giuseppe Andreoli (26 May 1943 - 25 August 1943)
- Generale di Divisione Mario Badino Rossi (26 August 1943 - 9 September 1943)
