= Giovanni Marciani =

Italian general

- Born: 22 May 1886; Mercato San Severino, Kingdom of Italy
- Died: 1964 (age 78); Mercato San Severino, Italy
- Military career
- Allegiance: Kingdom of Italy
- Branch: Royal Italian Army
- Rank: Lieutenant General
- Commands: 2nd Motorized Artillery Regiment; 58th Infantry Division Legnano; 208th Coastal Division; XII Army Corps Coastal Troops Command
- Conflicts: Italo-Turkish War; Battle of the Two Palms; World War I; Battles of the Isonzo; World War II; Italian occupation of southern France; Tunisian campaign; Allied invasion of Sicily
- Awards: Bronze Medal of Military Valor; War Cross of Military Valor; Order of the Crown of Italy; Order of Saints Maurice and Lazarus

Giovanni Marciani (22 May 1886 in Mercato San Severino – 1964) was an Italian general during World War II.

== Biography ==
=== Early life and career ===
Giovanni Marciani was born in 1886 in Mercato San Severino, in the province of Salerno, into a bourgeois family. In 1905 he entered the Royal Military Academy of Artillery and Engineers of Turin, graduating with the rank of artillery second lieutenant on September 5, 1907, and attended the Branch Application School before being promoted to lieutenant and assigned to the 24th Field Artillery Regiment, in Naples. In 1911 he was part of the expeditionary force in Libya during the Italo-Turkish War, in the ranks of the 2nd Special Field Artillery Regiment, participating in the battle of the Two Palms (for which he was awarded a Bronze Medal of Military Valor) and remaining in Libya until October 1912, when he returned to the 24th Field Artillery Regiment in Naples, as deputy adjutant of the regimental commander.

After being promoted to captain in December 1914, in February 1915 he assumed the position of commander of the 2nd Battery of the 22nd Field Artillery Regiment in Palermo and, for almost a year, of interim command of the 1st Artillery Group. He then left for the front during the First World War, earning a War Cross of Military Valor for an action on Monte Sei Busi during the Fourth Battle of the Isonzo. In August 1917 he was promoted to major for war merit and took command of the 1st Group of the 2nd Field Artillery Regiment of Pesaro; in August 1918 he was given command of the 4th 102 mm battery group of the 23rd Heavy Field Artillery Regiment.

=== Interwar years ===
Starting from 1919 he was assigned to serve in Cologna Veneta at the command of the 3rd Group of the Truck-Borne Mixed Field Artillery Regiment of Piacenza until 5 July 1920. On 30 September he established his headquarters at the Visconti Castle of Pavia and on 30 October he was posted to the "Renzo da Ceri" barracks in Crema. On 18 June 1922, Major Marciani left the command of the 3rd Group to Major Bartolomeo Pedrotti and was transferred to Milan at the Autocentro (Army motor vehicle depot), where he remained until 2 March 1924. He was then assigned to the horse artillery regiment of Milan from March 1924 to November 1925, and from November 1925 to June 1926, after promotion to lieutenant colonel, he became commander of the 4th Truckborne Group of the Voloire Regiment.

From 20 June 1926, he was commander of the cadet battalion at the Royal Academy of Artillery and Engineers in Turin until August 1931, when he attended the 7th application course for senior officers at the War School of Turin and in November 1933 he returned to the horse artillery regiment of Milan, as commander of the regimental depot. In this period Marciani married poet Maria Antonietta De Carolis, sister of lieutenant colonel Ugo de Carolis. In October 1934 he was placed in charge of raising the 2nd Motorized Artillery Regiment of the 2nd Cavalry Division Emanuele Filiberto Testa di Ferro in Bologna, and in the following December he assumed command of the regiment after promotion to the rank of colonel. In September 1936 he transferred his regiment from Bologna to Ferrara. From 1 October 1936, having left the regiment to Colonel Mario Martorelli, Marciani was assigned as head of office to the command of the army corps of Rome, and from 1 September 1939 he obtained promotion to brigadier general and became commander of the artillery of the 8th Army Corps of Rome.

=== World War II and later years ===
He was still holding this post when the Kingdom of Italy entered World War II, on 10 June 1940; on the following 4 September, he was appointed head of the third directorate of the Undersecretariat of State for War Production (later Ministry of War Industry), headed by the General Carlo Favagrossa. He remained in office until November 17, 1942, when he fell out with Favagrossa, who had him transferred to southern France.

Having been meanwhile promoted to major general in January 1942, he was given command of the 58th Infantry Division Legnano (stationed in Nice for occupation duties) for a short period between November and December 1942, being then taken over by Brigadier General Roberto Olmi, before returning to Rome at the disposal of the Ministry of War. On 28 April 1943, after a brief period in command of the artillery of the First Army in Tunisia, Marciani assumed command of the 208th Coastal Division, with headquarters in Palermo, replacing general Gaetano Binacchi.

On 10 July 1943, the Allies landed in southeastern Sicily; the area garrisoned by the 208th Coastal Division was unaffected by the initial landings. On 17 July Armed Forces Command Sicily, in an attempt to stop the American drive towards Palermo, established the Coastal Troops Command of the XII Army Corps, gathering all static units of the XII Army Corps under its command, and appointed Marciani as its commander. His troops, low in morale and crippled by rising desertions, were overwhelmed by Allied superiority of armament and air power, and on 22 July Marciani was captured in a coup de main by American troops of the 82nd Armored Reconnaissance Battalion, at his headquarters in the Royal Palace of Palermo. On the same day General Giuseppe Molinero, military commander of Palermo and subordinated to Marciani, surrendered the city to General Geoffrey Keyes, overriding his absent superior.

Marciani was then imprisoned in a prisoner-of-war camp in Saint-Cloud, near Oran, where he remained until December 1944. After his release and return to Italy, he learned of the death of his wife, killed in Bellona on 13 October 1943 (according to different sources, by a stray shot during the fighting between German and American troops, or by German soldiers for having sheltered Italian partisans). He remained at the disposal of the Ministry of War until 1945, when he was discharged from active duty and promoted to Lieutenant General of the reserve.

After the war, General Marciani was president of a center of military history studies. He died in 1964.
