= 230th Coastal Division =

Royal Italian Army infantry division during World War II

- Active: 1943 – 1943
- Country: Kingdom of Italy
- Branch: Royal Italian Army
- Size: Division
- Garrison/HQ: Castelvetrano
- Engagements: World War II

Insignia
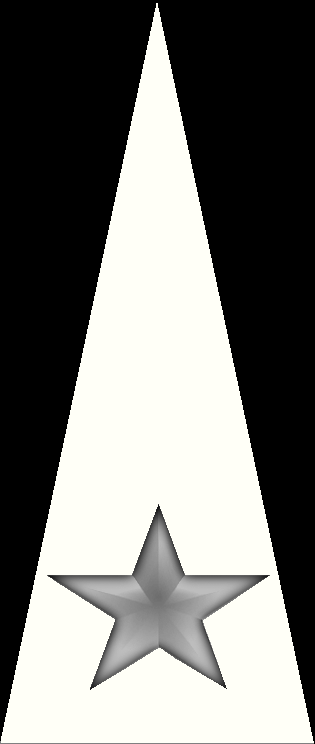
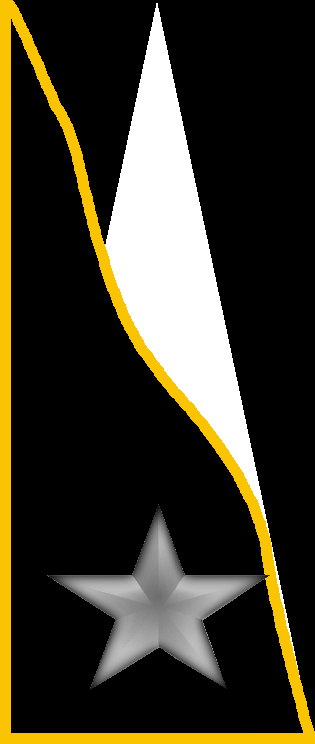
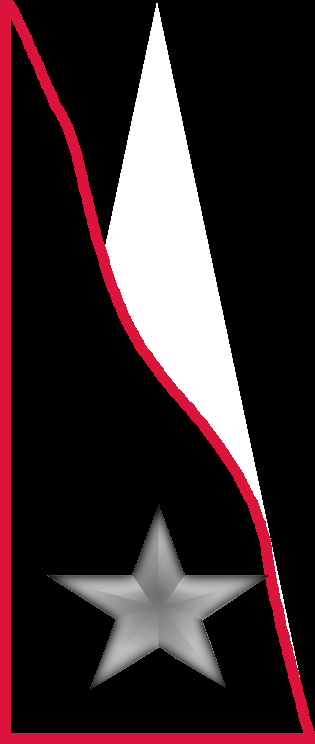
- Identification symbol: 230th Coastal Division gorget patches

The 230th Coastal Division (Italian: 230ª Divisione Costiera) was an infantry division of the Royal Italian Army during World War II.

== History ==
On 20 May 1943 the 8th Marching Division was disbanded and on 1 June 1943 the command of the 230th Coastal Division was formed with the 8th Marching Division's personnel. The command arrived in Castelvetrano in Sicily on 3 July 1943 and was assigned to the XII Army Corps in the island's western part. On 10 July 1943, the day the Allied invasion of Sicily began, the 230th received two coastal regiments and one artillery regiment from the 202nd Coastal Division. The 230th Coastal Division took over responsibility from the 202nd Coastal Division for the coastal defense of the coast between Mazara del Vallo and Marsala, and added the coast between Marsala and Trapani.

Between 21 and 24 July 1943 the 230th Division was overrun by vastly superior US Army forces and was considered annihilated by the later date.

== Organization ==
- 230th Coastal Division
  - 120th Coastal Regiment
    - CCXLV Coastal Battalion
    - CCCLXXX Coastal Battalion
    - DCCCLVII Coastal Battalion
  - 184th Coastal Regiment
    - CCCLXXXVII Coastal Battalion
    - CDXVI Coastal Battalion
    - CDXCVII Coastal Battalion
  - 43rd Coastal Artillery Grouping
    - VII Coastal Artillery Group (1 × 149/35 and 1 × 155/36 battery)
    - XX Coastal Artillery Group (1 × 149/35 and 1 × 155/36 battery)
    - XXII Coastal Artillery Group (105/28 cannons)
    - CCXVIII Coastal Artillery Group (100/22 mod. 14/19 howitzers)
  - 712th Machine Gun Company
  - 230th Carabinieri Section
  - 124th Field Post Office

=== Commanding officers ===
The division's commanding officer was:

- Generale di Divisione Egisto Conti (1 June 1943 - 24 July 1943, POW)
