= Luigi Mazzini =

Italian general

- Born: 13 July 1883; Mortara, Kingdom of Italy
- Died: 1 May 1967 (aged 83)
- Military career
- Allegiance: Kingdom of Italy
- Branch: Royal Italian Army
- Service years: 1904–1943
- Rank: Major General
- Commands: 3rd Alpine Artillery Regiment "Julia"; 5th Alpine Artillery Regiment "Pusteria"; Reserve Artillery Officers School; 33rd Infantry Division Acqui; 224th Coastal Division
- Conflicts: Italo-Turkish War; Battle of Ain Zara; Battle of Gargaresh; Battle of Zanzur; World War I; Albanian campaign; Second Italo-Ethiopian War; World War II; Battle of the Western Alps; Greco-Italian War; Italian occupation of France
- Awards: Bronze Medal of Military Valor (three times); War Cross for Military Valor; Colonial Order of the Star of Italy; Order of Saints Maurice and Lazarus

Luigi Mazzini (13 July 1883 – 1 May 1967) was an Italian general during World War II.

== Biography ==
=== Early life ===
He was born in Mortara, province of Pavia, on 13 July 1883, son of Carlo Mazzini and Merope Spagna. After enlisting in the Royal Italian Army, on 5 September 1904 he entered the Royal Military Academy of Artillery and Engineers in Turin, from which he graduated with the rank of artillery second lieutenant.

=== Career ===
He fought during the Italo-Turkish War, distinguishing himself during the battles of Ain Zara, Gargaresh and Zanzur, for which he was awarded a Bronze Medal of Military Valor. During the Great War he distinguished himself during the Albanian campaign with the 1st Mixed Artillery Group of the 38th Division, earning a War Cross for Military Valor.

He was promoted to colonel on 12 June 1933, and between 1 January 1934 and 24 September 1935 he was commander of the 3rd Alpine Artillery Regiment "Julia". On 31 December 1935 he assumed command of the newly established 5th Alpine Artillery Regiment "Pusteria", with which he left to fight in the war in Ethiopia, where he received another Bronze Medal. On 24 September 1937 he was replaced at the command of the 5th Alpine Artillery Regiment by Colonel Antonio Norcen, and returned to Italy. On 20 December 1937 he was promoted to brigadier general, then assuming command of the School for Reserve Artillery Officers and from 1939 that of the artillery of the 1st Army Corps in Turin.

When the Kingdom of Italy entered the Second World War on 10 June 1940, he was in command of the artillery of the 4th Army operating on the western Alpine front against France, remaining there until February 1941 and receiving another Bronze Medal. In February 1941 he assumed command of the 33rd Infantry Division "Acqui", engaged on the Greek-Albanian front. In April 1941, after the collapse of Greece, he oversaw the occupation of the Ionian Islands. On 1 July 1941 he was promoted to major general. On 24 October 1942 he was replaced in command of the "Acqui" by General Ernesto Chiminello, and assumed command of the 224th Coastal Division, established in January 1943 in Nice, in occupied France. On 26 April he was assigned to the Ministry of War for special assignments, being attached to the Territorial Defence Command of Turin, and 12 July 1943 he was transferred to the Army reserve after having reached the age limits. He died on 1 May 1967.
