= Luigi Sibille =

Italian general during World War II

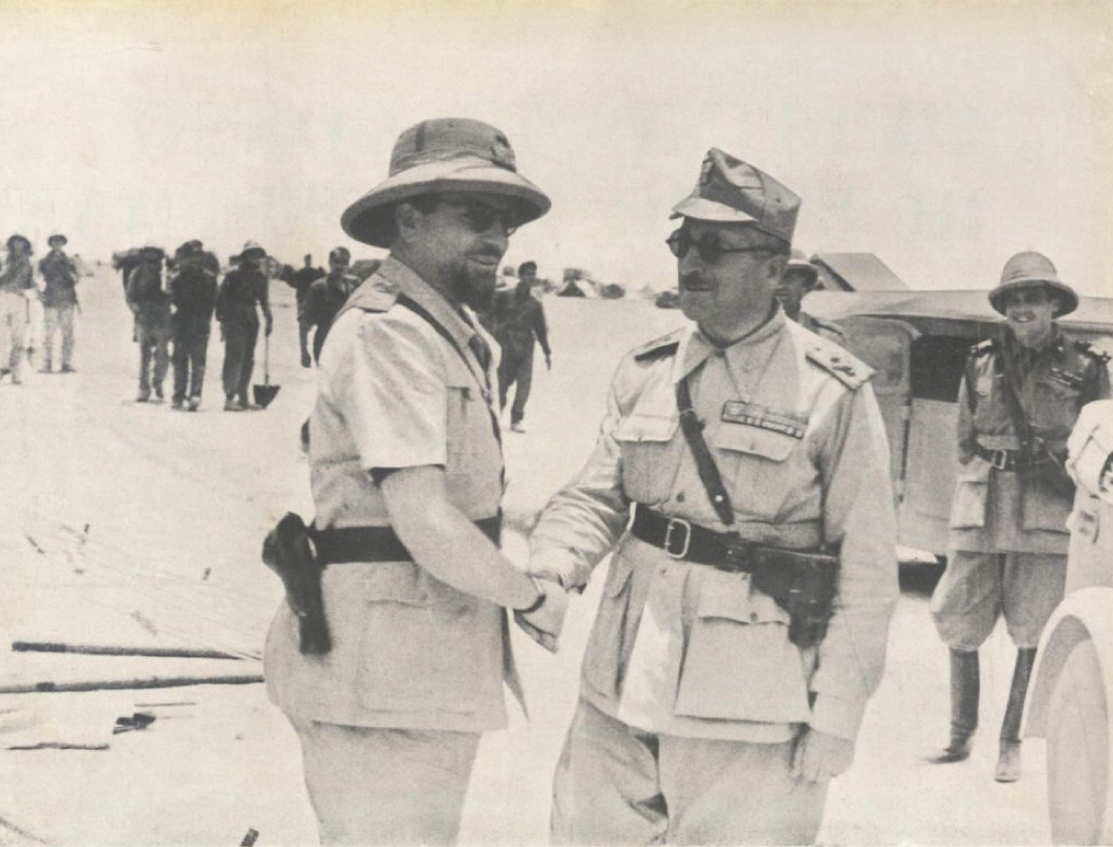
- Sibille (right) with Italo Balbo in Bir el Gubi, in 1940
- Born: 1 September 1884; Cesana Torinese, Kingdom of Italy
- Died: 21 October 1964 (aged 80)
- Military career
- Allegiance: Kingdom of Italy
- Branch: Royal Italian Army
- Rank: Major General
- Commands: "Tirano" Alpini Battalion "Pieve di Cadore" Alpini Battalion; 1st Libyan Division; 202nd Coastal Division
- Conflicts: Italo-Turkish War; World War I; Battle of Mount Ortigara; Battle of the Piave; Battle of Vittorio Veneto; Pacification of Libya; World War II; North African campaign
- Awards: Silver Medal of Military Valor (twice); Bronze Medal of Military Valor

Luigi Sibille (Cesana Torinese, 1 September 1884 – 21 October 1964) was an Italian general during World War II. At the outbreak of the war he commanded the 1st Libyan Division, also known as the "Sibille Division".

== Biography ==
In 1904 he entered the Military Academy of Modena, from which he graduated on 7 September 1905 with the rank of second lieutenant, assigned to the Alpini corps. He took part in the Italo-Turkish War as a lieutenant, being decorated with the Bronze Medal of Military Valor, and then in the First World War, in command of the "Tirano" Alpini Battalion in the Battle of Mount Ortigara (where he was slightly wounded) and then on the Piave from 25 December 1917 to 23 March 1918, later participating in the battle of Vittorio Veneto; by the end of the war he had received two Silver Medals of Military Valor and reached the rank of major in command of the "Pieve di Cadore" Alpini Battalion of the 7th Alpini Regiment, in whose ranks was Lieutenant Italo Balbo.

During the interwar period, after serving in the Royal Corps of Colonial Troops in Tripolitania, he was promoted to colonel on 21 December 1931, taking up special positions at the Ministry of Italian Africa in Rome. On 1 July 1937 he was promoted to brigadier general, remaining in service at the Ministry, and then in April 1938 he became deputy commander of the 6th Infantry Division Cuneo in Milan, until 31 August 1939. From 20 April 1940 he became commander of the 1st Libyan Division in Cyrenaica, based in Sidi Aziz, at the orders the Governor of Libya, Marshal Italo Balbo, who had once been his subordinate during the First World War.

On 1 July 1940 he became major general, but a week later he was replaced in the command of the 1st Libyan Division by General Giovanni Cerio. After being repatriated, after various special assignments to the 1st Corps of Turin, on 5 August 1942 he assumed command of the 202nd Coastal Division in Sicily, which he kept until May 1943, after which he was attached to the Territorial Defence Command of Turin.
