= XII Army Corps (Italy) =

The XII Army Corps (Italian: XII Corpo d'Armata) was a corps of the Royal Italian Army between 1883 and 1943.

== History ==
The XII Corps was created in Palermo, Sicily on 8 July 1883, with mainly administrative and territorial tasks. Dissolved in 1919, it was reformed on 11 March 1926, again in Palermo.
At the beginning of World War II, the Corps was responsible for the defense of all of Sicily and the islands of Lampedusa and Pantelleria.

In July 1943, the Corps was composed of :

- 26th Infantry Division "Assietta"
- 28th Infantry Division "Aosta"
- 202nd Coastal Division
- 207th Coastal Division
- 208th Coastal Division
- 230th Coastal Division
- XXIX Coastal Brigade

Together with the XVI Army Corps, the XII Corps was engaged in intense fighting during the Allied invasion of Sicily (9 July – 17 August 1943) and suffered heavy casualties.
The remnants of the Corps were withdrawn to Campania to be reorganized. On 13 September the Corps was dissolved in Avellino, following the Armistice with the allied forces.

== Commanders ==
- Army Corps General Adriano Alberti (1934 - 1935)
- Army Corps General Vittorio Ambrosio (30 October 1935 - 10 December 1938)
- Army Corps General Angelo Rossi (10 December 1938 - 30 June 1941)
- Army Corps General Mario Arisio (1 July 1941 - 12 July 1943)
- Army Corps General Francesco Zingales (12 July 1943 - 13 September 1943)
