= Francesco Zingales =

Italian general (1884–1959)

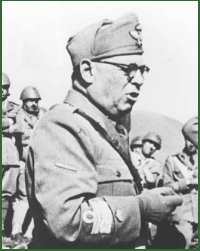
- Born: 1884
- Died: 1959 (aged 74–75)
- Military career
- Allegiance: Kingdom of Italy
- Branch: Royal Italian Army
- Commands: 10th Motorised Division Piave; Italian Expeditionary Corps in Russia; Seventh Army; Italian XX Motorised Corps; XXX Army Corps; XXXI Army Corps; XII Army Corps
- Conflicts: First World War: Battles of the Isonzo; Second World War: Invasion of Yugoslavia; Operation Little Saturn; Allied invasion of Sicily

Francesco Zingales (1884–1959) was a general in the Royal Italian Army during World War II.

== Biography ==
Francesco Zingales fought in World War I on the Isonzo Front.

In 1939 he had become commander of the 10th Motorised Division Piave, but saw no action in 1940. In April 1941, during the World War II Axis powers invasion of Yugoslavia, he commanded the Motorised Corps.
In September 1941, he was appointed as commander of the Italian Expeditionary Corps in Russia, but fell ill in Vienna on his way to the front and was replaced by Giovanni Messe.
After his recovery, he became commander of the XXX Army Corps and reserve Seventh Army.
Later in 1942, he was stationed a couple of months in North Africa at the head of the Italian XX Motorised Corps and then in Calabria as commander of the XXXI Army Corps.
In November 1942, on his turn he replaced Giovanni Messe as commander of the XXXV Corps, which was a part of the 8th Italian Army in Russia. After the Soviet Operation Little Saturn, his Corps was forced to withdraw from the Don River.

After his return in Italy in 1943, he became on 12 July commander of the XII Italian Corps in Sicily with which he fought against the Allied invasion of Sicily.
