= Capo Vaticano =

Cape in Calabria, Italy

Capo Vaticano lighthouse
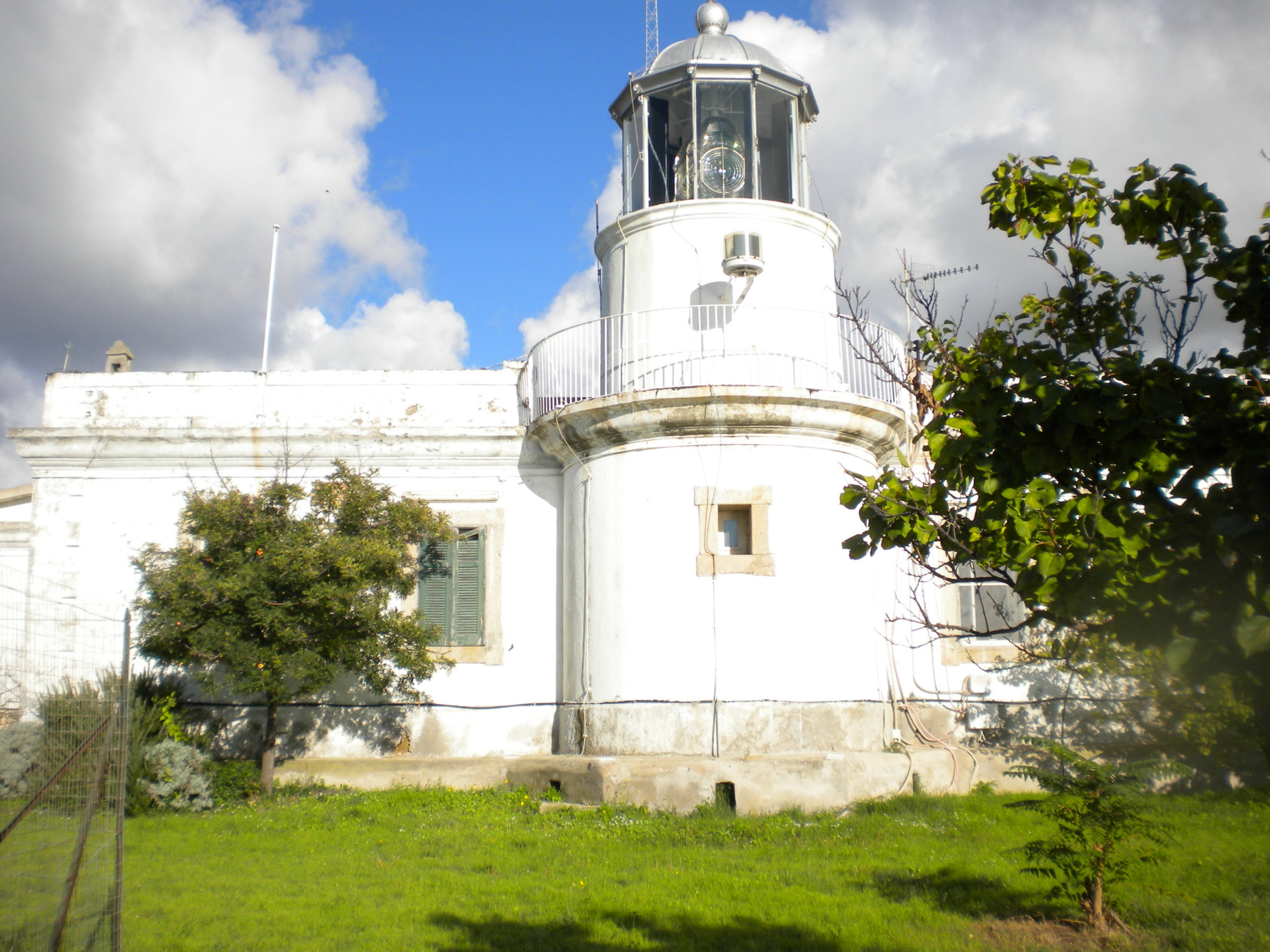
- Location: Capo Vaticano, Ricadi, Italy
- Coordinates: 38°37′10″N 15°49′43″E

Tower
- Constructed: 1885
- Height: 8 m (26 ft)
- Power source: mains electricity

Light
- Focal height: 108 m (354 ft)
- Lens: second order Fresnel lens
- Range: 24 nmi (44 km; 28 mi)
- Characteristic: Fl(4) W 20s

Capo Vaticano is a wide bathing place in the Municipality of Ricadi in Calabria, Italy. The 'Cape' is formed by a particular white-grey granite, which is examined worldwide for its geologic characteristics.

== Geography ==
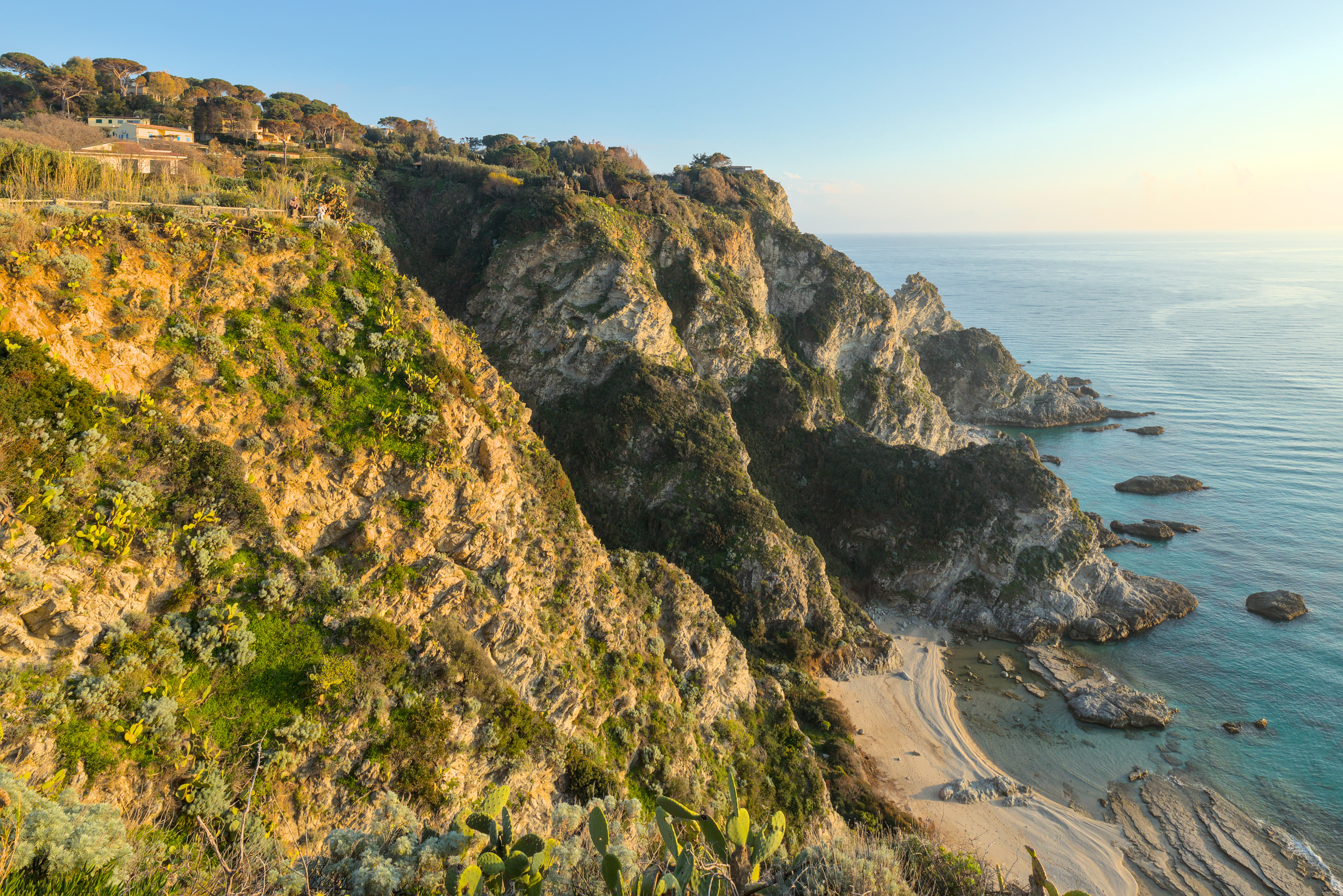
Capo Vaticano at sunset

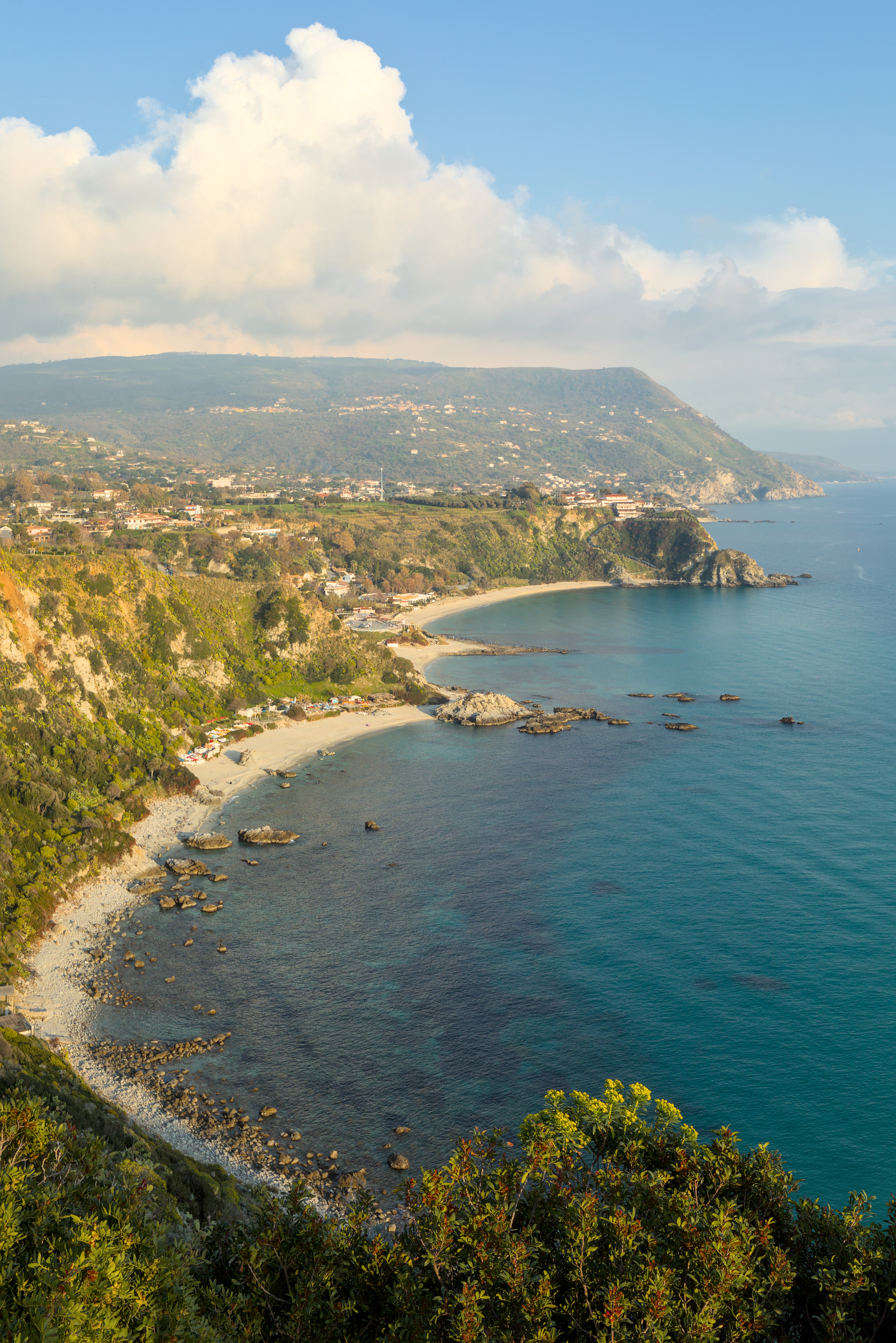
View from Capo Vaticano

The maximum altitude of the cape is about 124 metres.

The coast of Capo Vaticano starts from Santa Maria beach up to Tonicello beach. The most suggestive bays near the Cape are Praia I Focu and Grotticelle.

== History ==
The famous Venetian writer Giuseppe Berto made Capo Vaticano his home, after travelling throughout Italy. "Capo Vaticano", he wrote, "is called Vatican as a Roman hill: once priests and fortune tellers searched for the future basing their predictions on birds' flights. 200 metres over the Cape there is a rock called Mantineo and in ancient Greek, it means: to communicate with God. The Cape was a holy place and now it is the same."

== Economy ==
Capo Vaticano is considered the ideal place to have a climate suitable for growing the Red onions of Tropea.

== See also ==
- Capo Vaticano Lighthouse
