= 7th Army (Italy) =

The 7th Army (Italian: 7ª Armata) was a World War I and World War II field army of the Royal Italian Army.

== World War I ==
After the disastrous defeat at Caporetto (November 1917) the Italian Army was completely reorganized by Armando Diaz and the new 7th Italian Army was formed under command of Giulio Cesare Tassoni.
It participated in the successful Battle of the Piave River (June 1918) and Battle of Vittorio Veneto (October-November 1918).

== World War II ==
The 7th Army was formed during several periods in World War II but always held in reserve. It saw little action. The 7th Army was first formed between September and December 1939, and later between June and October 1940, in reserve for the Italian invasion of France.

In September 1941 it was again formed, to defend Southern Italy (Apulia, Campania, Lazio and Calabria).
In September 1943, after the Armistice of Cassibile, they offered little resistance to the Allied invasion of Italy and surrendered to the Germans.

Commanders were

- Emanuele Filiberto, Duke of Pistoia (June 1940 – October 1940)
- Francesco Zingales (Interim) (September - October 1941)
- Adalberto, Duke of Bergamo (October 1941 – August 1943)
- Mario Arisio (August 1943 – September 1943)
