= Badolato =

- Comune
- Comune di Badolato
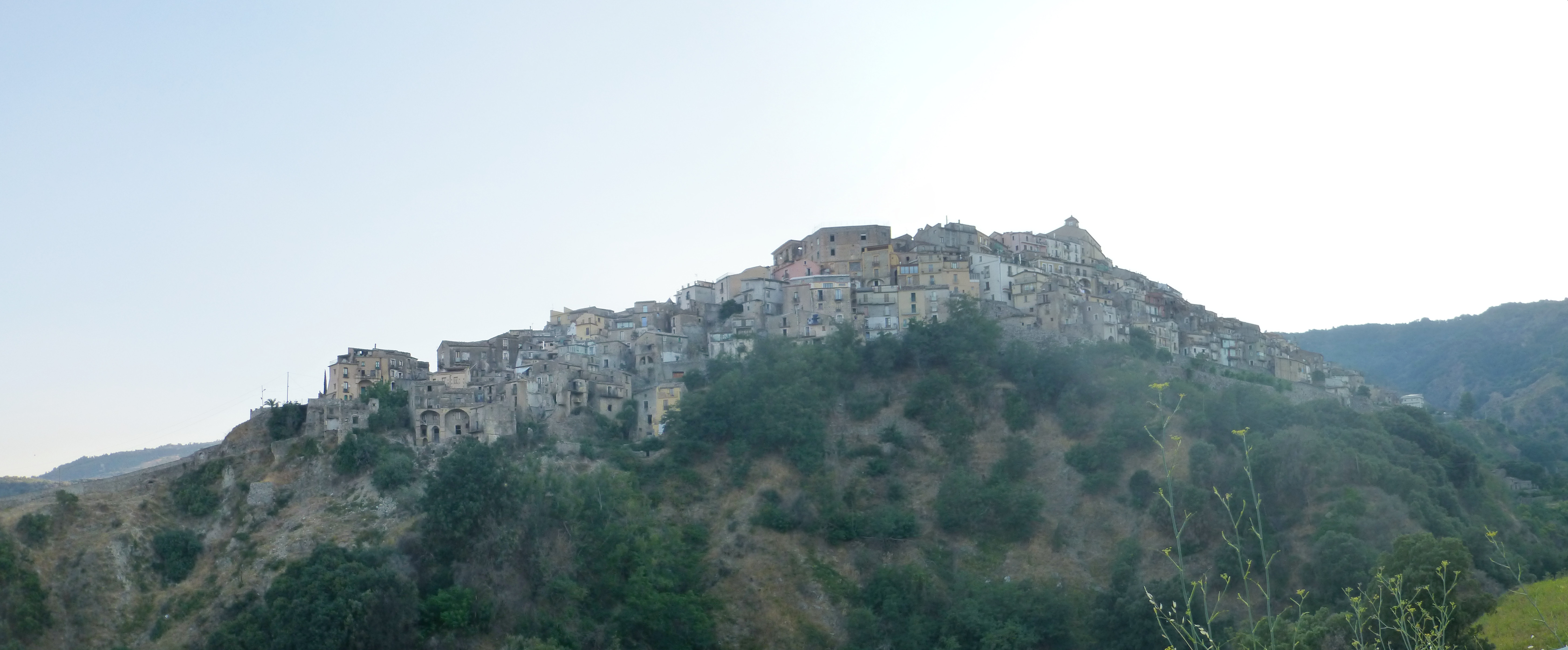

- Coat of arms

- Location within Italy Location within Calabria
- Coordinates: 38°34′N 16°32′E
- Country: Italy
- Region: Calabria
- Province: Catanzaro (CZ)
- Frazioni: Badolato Marina

Government
  - Mayor: Sebastiano Cento

Area
  - Total: 34.1 km^{2} (13.2 sq mi)
- Elevation: 240 m (790 ft)

Population (2013)
  - Total: 3,152
  - Density: 92.4/km^{2} (239/sq mi)
- Demonym: Badolatesi
- Time zone: UTC+1 (CET)
  - Summer (DST): UTC+2 (CEST)
- Postal code: 88061
- Dialing code: 0967
- Patron saint: Saint Andrea Avellino
- Saint day: 10 November
- Website: Official website

Badolato (Sicilian: Badulatu) is a comune and town in the province of Catanzaro in the Calabria region of Italy. As of 2013 Badolato had an estimated population of 3,152. It is one of I Borghi più belli d'Italia ("The most beautiful villages of Italy"). It was chosen as the second most beautiful village in Italy in April 2024 in a national RAI TV series.

== Territory ==
The village of Badolato is 30 kilometres (19 mi) from Catanzaro on Calabria's Ionian coast. Situated approximately 240 metres (790 ft) above sea level, Badolato has several Byzantine churches arranged in the shape of a Latin cross, and many small alleyways characteristic of medieval towns. It is an agricultural center for the area on the Ionian side of the Calabrian mountain range, located on the north-western slopes of Mount St. Nicholas. It occupies a spur between two valleys which open out to the coastal plain below. Above the railway station is the town of Badolato Marina, situated on the SS106 Ionica state highway.

== History ==
During the Angevin era of the Kingdom of Naples, Badolato was controlled by local lords who took control from Pietro Ruffo, Count of Catanzaro. In 1454, Badolato became a barony held by the Toraldo family until 1596. It then passed to the Ravaschieri in 1596, to the Pinelli, and Gallelli in 1658 and to the Pignatelli of Belmonte from 1779 to 1806. Severely damaged by the earthquakes of 1640, 1659 and 1783, the town was also hit by the floods of 1951.

== Main sights ==
Ruins of the perimeter walls of the Ravaschieri castle, said to date from the 17th century, still exist. The Church of Sant'Isidoro, in the village of the same name, bears traces of Byzantine frescoes. The Church of Sant'Andrea Avellino has two wooden busts of St. Andrew and St. Francis of Paola and valuable, sacred furnishings from the 17th and 18th centuries.

In the church of Santa Caterina there is an ornate altar and a table depicting the Madonna and Child, both from the 15th and 16th centuries. In the Chiesa dei Riformati, there is a piece of the official altar of frà Diego de' Careri, 1644, a crucifix from the same artist and major works of art from the eighteenth century. The church of Santa Maria degli Angeli, along with the adjoining convent of Friars Minor, is of Baroque design.

== Economy ==
Badolato is known as a centre of oil production and wine, which are largely exported. Farm also produce grain and fruit. There are many companies the business of breeding cattle, sheep and goats, as well as the processing of dairy products. Until recently some families used hand looms for the production of blankets and scarves of wool and silk, and also distilled turpentine. There are also oil mills and shirt factories.

Increasingly tourism is becoming important with a number of the houses in the village being renovated or rebuilt as second homes of a high standard. Bed & breakfast services are operating in Badolato Superiore while in Badolato Marina a new development of second homes for the Danish market has joined the existing hotels and facilities.
