= Operation Baytown =

1943 Allied amphibious assault on Italy across the Straits of Messina

- Part of the Allied invasion of Italy
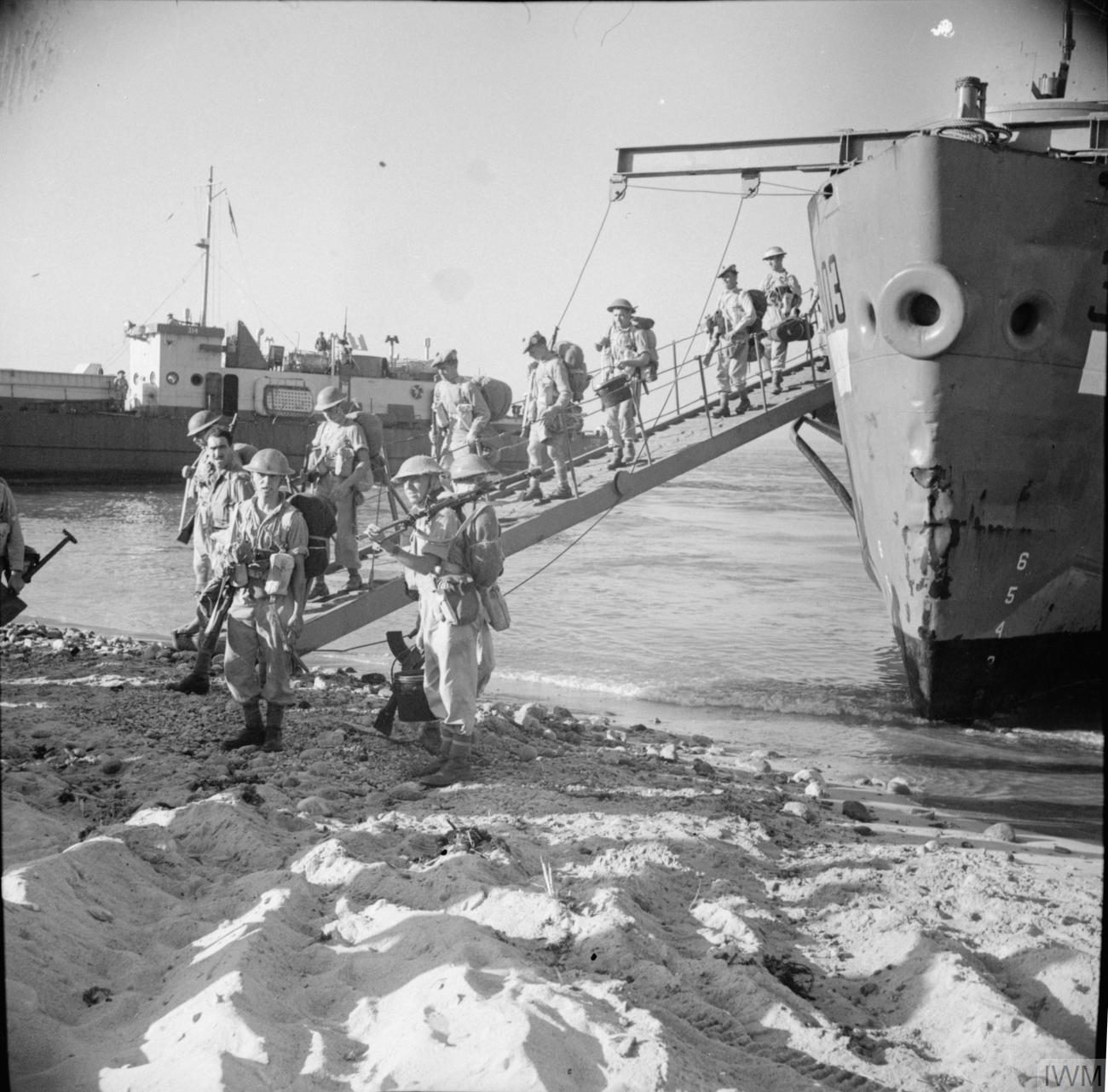
- British troops, presumably of the 5th Infantry Division, come ashore at Reggio, during the Allied invasion of Italy, September 1943.
Date	3 – 8 September 1943
Location	Reggio Calabria, Italy 38°06′35.0″N 15°38′31.3″E
Result	Allied victory

Belligerents
United Kingdom; Canada	Italy; Germany

Commanders and leaders
(United Kingdom) Bernard Montgomery (United Kingdom) Miles C. Dempsey (Canada) Guy Simonds	(Kingdom of Italy) Mario Arisio (Kingdom of Italy) Camillo Mercalli (Nazi Germany) Traugott Herr

Units involved
(United Kingdom) XIII Corps	(Kingdom of Italy) XXXI Corps; LXXVI Panzer Corps

Operation Baytown was an Allied amphibious landing on the mainland of Italy that took place on 3 September 1943, part of the Allied invasion of Italy, itself part of the Italian Campaign, during the Second World War.

== Planning ==
The attack was made by Lieutenant-General Miles C. Dempsey's British XIII Corps, which had under command the 1st Canadian Infantry Division (Major-General Guy Simonds) and the British 5th Infantry Division (Major-General Gerard C. Bucknall). XIII Corps was part of the British Eighth Army, commanded by General Sir Bernard Montgomery. XIII Corps crossed the Straits of Messina from Sicily to Reggio di Calabria, covered by a heavy artillery barrage from Sicily and air cover from the Desert Air Force operating from Sicilian airfields. The intent was to tie down German forces in the area and gain an Allied foothold at the 'toe' of Italy. Montgomery had objected to Baytown as ineffective, preferring to prioritise Operation Avalanche, but followed orders and prepared to carry it out anyway. However, when essential landing craft and naval resources were diverted to Avalanche he complained again.

The German commander, Generalfeldmarschall Albert Kesselring, and his staff did not believe the Calabria landing was the main Allied attack, which they expected at Salerno, or possibly north of Naples, or even near Rome. He therefore ordered General der Panzertruppe Traugott Herr's LXXVI Panzer Corps, part of the German 10th Army under Generaloberst Heinrich von Vietinghoff to pull back from engagement with the Eighth Army and delay them by the demolition of bridges and other infrastructure. A single German regiment was left at the southernmost tip of Italy to support the Italian 211th Coastal Division.

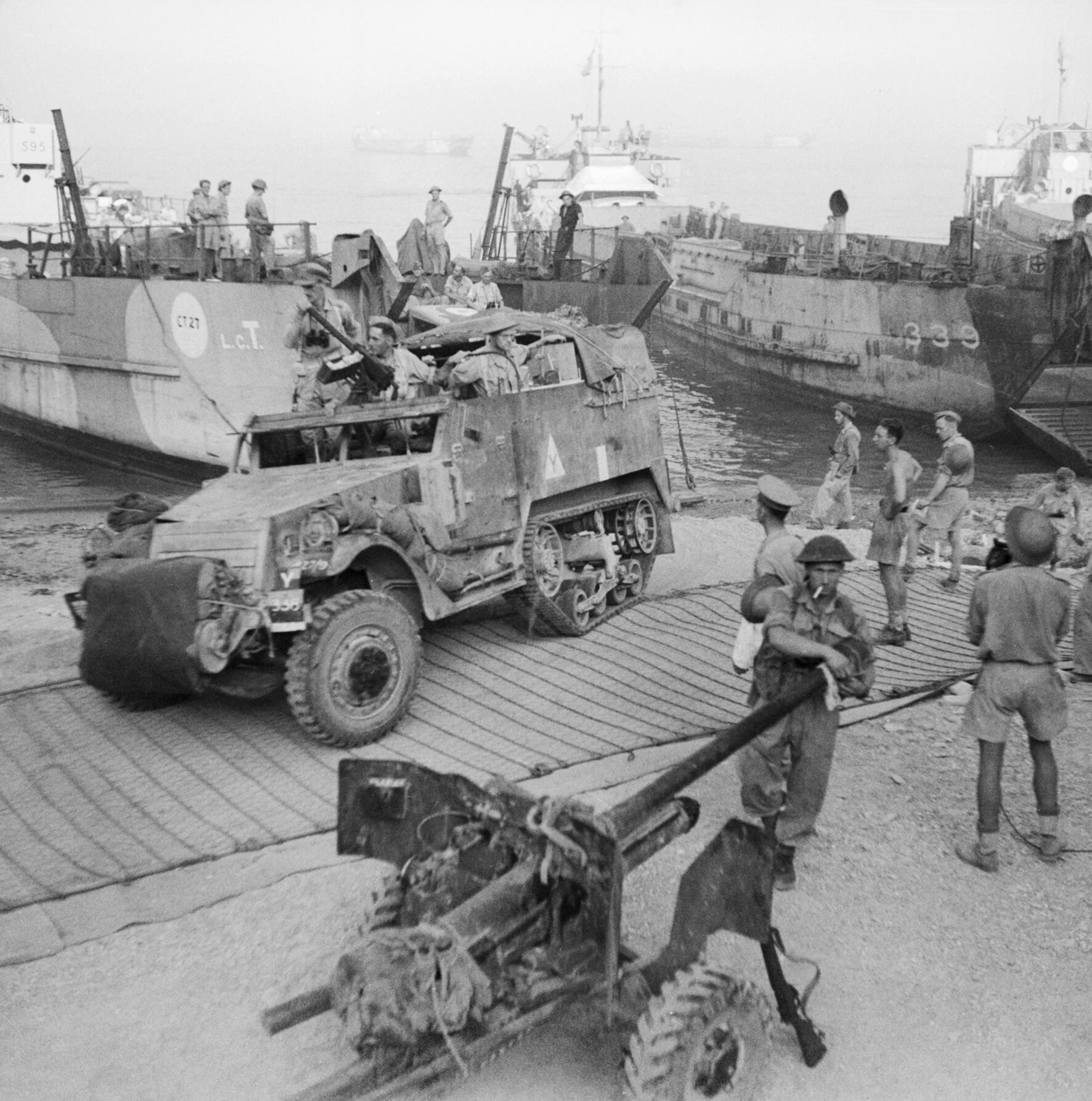
A half-track and 6-pounder anti-tank gun coming ashore from landing craft at Reggio, Italy, 3 September 1943.

== Execution ==
Montgomery's objections were proved correct: German troops refused battle and the Eighth Army tied down none of them. The main obstacle to the Allied advance was the terrain and German demolitions.

Opposition to the landings was very light, because the few German troops in the area rapidly withdrew northward. Italian troops on the coast, belonging to the coastal divisions, were poorly equipped, demoralized by the political situation and the massive Allied bombardment; they offered no resistance to the landing. An exception was the 185th Infantry Regiment "Nembo" which was attached to the 211th Coastal Division, had provided more determined resistance on the Aspromonte massif, but was eventually overcome on 8 September 1943.

== Aftermath ==
Operation Baytown was followed by Operation Slapstick, with the British 1st Airborne Division (Major-General George Hopkinson), and Operation Avalanche, the main landings at Salerno by elements of Lieutenant General Mark Clark's U.S. Fifth Army. Both operations took place on 9 September, following the Italian surrender the day before. The surrender had been agreed on 3 September, but was not publicly announced until 8 September, and had no direct effect on Baytown.

== See also ==
- Allied invasion of Italy order of battle
