= Pirazzoli =

Pirazzoli (Italian pronunciation: [piratˈtsɔːli]) is an Italian surname derived from the given name Piero, originating in Emilia-Romagna. Notable people with the surname include:

- Michèle Pirazzoli-t'Serstevens (1934–2018), French archaeologist and art historian
- Odorado Pirazzoli (1815–1884), Italian army major and entomologist
- Paolo Antonio Pirazzoli (1939–2017), Italian-French geomorphologist
- Pinuccio Pirazzoli (born 1949), Italian composer, conductor and record producer

== See also ==
- Pedrazzoli
- Perazzoli
- Pieraccini
