= Perazzoli =

Perazzoli (Italian pronunciation: [peratˈtsɔːli]) is an Italian surname derived from the given name Piero, originating in Verona and Piacenza. Notable people with the surname include:

- Ettore Perazzoli (1974–2003), Italian free software developer
- Lou Perazzoli, American computer scientist
- Mani Perazzoli, member of English band Buzzcocks

== See also ==
- Perazzolo
- Pedrazzoli
- Pirazzoli
- Pieraccini
