= Luigi Mentasti =

Luigi Mentasti (2 May 1883 – 26 August 1958) was a general in the Royal Italian Army who commanded the XIV Corps during the Italian occupation of Montenegro.

== Biography ==
Mentasti fought in the Italian-Turkish War and in World War I.
Between 21 April 1938 and 7 September 1939, he commanded the 2nd Infantry Division "Sforzesca".
For the next 2 years, he was Commandant of the Supreme Institute of War in Turin.

On 12 July 1941, he succeeded Giovanni Vecchi as commander of the XIV Corps, which was charged with the occupation of Montenegro.
He was sent to crush an Uprising, which was achieved in 6 weeks time.
On 1 December 1941, the Army Corps was renamed Command Troops Montenegro and on 1 January 1942, Mentasti was promoted to Army Corps General.
He remained in command of the Montenegro troops until 1 May 1943, when he repatriated and placed on leave at the age of 60.
