= XIV Army Corps (Italy) =

The XIV Corps (Italian: XIV Corpo d'Armata) was a corps of the Royal Italian Army during World War II that participated in the invasion of Yugoslavia.

== History ==
In World War I a XIV Corps was formed in Naples in 1915 and dissolved on 5 September 1919.

It was reconstituted in Treviso on 1 January 1939 and received the "Marche" and "Puglie" infantry divisions under its own authority.

On 10 June 1940, the XIV Corps was deployed in eastern Veneto with headquarters in Treviso; it was composed of the "Marche" and "Puglie" Divisions and didn't take part in any war operations.

In February 1941, the Corps received the order to move to Albania and it participated in the Invasion of Yugoslavia. It conquered and occupied Kosovo and parts of Yugoslav Macedonia.
In July 1941, following the deterioration of the situation in Montenegro due to the presence of strong guerrilla formations, the Army Corps was transferred to this region as an occupation force. To carry out this new task, it was considerably strengthened and included the "Messina", "Venice", "Taro", "Pusteria" and "Cacciatori delle Alpi" divisions as well as the I and II Valle Alpini Group. From 1 December it assumed the name of Command Troops Montenegro (XIV).

For the rest of the war, XIV Corps, still subjected to intense partisan activity, remained in the Italian governorate of Montenegro, organized the coastal defense of southern Yugoslavia and carried out frequent anti-guerrilla operations. On 28 September 1943, the Corps was disarmed by the Germans and dissolved.

== Commanders ==
=== Comando XIV Corpo d'Armata (1940–41) ===
- Army Corps General Giovanni Vecchi (10 June 1940 - 12 July 1941)
- Army Corps General Luigi Mentasti (12 July - 30 November 1941)

=== Comando Truppe Montenegro (XIV Corpo d'Armata) (1941–43) ===
- Army Corps General Luigi Mentasti (1 December 1941 - 1 May 1943)
- Army Corps General Curio Barbasetti di Prun (1 May - 13 July 1943) ?
- Army Corps General Ercole Roncaglia (July 1943 - September 1943)
- Division General Antonio Franceschini (interim)
