= Michèle Pirazzoli-t'Serstevens =

French archaeologist and art historian (1934–2018)

- Born: Michèle t'Serstevens; 5 October 1934; 16th arrondissement of Paris
- Died: 26 July 2018 (aged 83); 5th arrondissement of Paris
- Alma mater: Lycée Racine; Institut national des langues et civilisations orientales; École du Louvre
- Occupation: Archaeologist, art historian, sinologist
- Employer: Guimet Museum; Musée d'Ennery; École du Louvre; École pratique des hautes études
- Spouse(s): Paolo Antonio Pirazzoli
- Awards: Knight of the National Order of Merit (1994)

Michèle Pirazzoli-t'Serstevens (née t'Serstevens; 5 October 1934 – 26 July 2018) was a French archaeologist and art historian, specializing in the material culture of early China.

== Education ==
Pirazzoli-t'Serstevens studied at the Lycée Racine in Paris. She then studied Asian languages (Vietnamese, Chinese, Hindi, Tamil, Japanese) at the École nationale des langues orientales vivantes (ENLOV), and India and the Far East at the École du Louvre. She was at Peking University, from 1964 to 1965.

== Career ==
Pirazzoli-t'Serstevens was a member of staff at the École Pratique des Hautes Études (EPHE), where she taught Archaeology from 1977 to 2002. In addition to her work at EPHE, she worked for the Musée Guimet (assistant, 1958-1965; associate-curator, 1966-1969; curator, 1966-1977). She was also curator of the Musée d'Ennery (1971-1979), taught East Asian art history at the École du Louvre (1968-1977), and associated with the Maison franco-japonaise de Tokyo (1974-1975). She participated in archaeological excavations at Sambor Prei Kuk et Mimot (Cambodia), in 1961-1962, Bahrain in 1978, Suhar in 1982, Julfar in 1994 and Brunei in 1998.

She had three key areas of research:

- Archaeology and material culture of Han dynasty China, especially funerary architecture and iconography, food, and the non-Han cultures of south-west China
- Chinese ceramics and their export to the Middle East and Europe, 9th-16th century
- Art at the court of the Manchu emperors, 18th century, in particular the role played by the Jesuit missionaries (painters and architects), and European influences on Chinese art at that time.

== Awards and honours ==
- Chevalier dans l'Ordre national du Mérite
- Officier dans l'Ordre des Palmes académiques
- Prix Delalande-Guérineau de l'Académie des Inscriptions et Belles-Lettres
- Prix Herbert Allen Giles de l'Académie des Inscriptions et Belles-Lettres

== Publications ==
Books

- La civilisation du royaume de Dian à l'époque Han, Paris, Ecole française d'Extrême-Orient, 1974.
- La Chine des Han, Paris, PUF, 1982.
- Giuseppe Castiglione (1688-1766), peintre et architecte à la cour de Chine, Paris, Thalia, 2007.
- Les dynasties Qin et Han, avec Marianne Bujard, Paris, Les Belles Lettres, 2017.
- La Cina, 2 vols, Turin, UTET, 1996

Articles

- "Les chasses de l'empereur Qianlong à Mulan", (with Hou Ching-lang), T'oung Pao, vol. LXV 1-3, 1979, pp. 13-50.
- "Death and the Dead : Practices and Images in the Qin and Han", in John Lagerwey and Marc Kalinowski, eds, Early Chinese Religion : Part One : Shang through Han (1250BC-220AD), Leiden, Brill, 2009, pp. 949-1026.
- "The Brunei Shipwreck : A Witness to the International Trade in the China Sea around 1500", The Silk Road 9 (2011), p. 5-17.

== Personal life ==
Pirazzoli-t'Serstevens was married to the geomorphologist Paolo Antonio Pirazzoli.
