= Gino Pedrazzoli =

Italian general

- Born: 2 August 1884; Turin, Kingdom of Italy
- Died: 1 January 1973 (aged 88); San Giovanni del Dosso, Italy
- Military career
- Allegiance: Kingdom of Italy
- Branch: Royal Italian Army
- Rank: Lieutenant General
- Commands: 15th Infantry Regiment "Savona"; 48th Infantry Division Taro
- Conflicts: Italo-Turkish War; World War I; World War II; Greco-Italian War; Italian occupation of Montenegro; Italian occupation of France
- Awards: Military Order of Savoy; Order of the Crown of Italy; Order of Saints Maurice and Lazarus

Gino Pedrazzoli (2 August 1884 – 1 January 1973) was an Italian general during World War II.

== Biography ==
He was born in Turin on 2 August 1884. After enlisting in the Royal Italian Army, he attended the Royal Military Academy of Infantry and Cavalry in Modena, graduating in 1905 with the rank of second lieutenant in the Bersaglieri. He participated in the Italo-Turkish War and in the First World War as an officer of the 2nd Bersaglieri Regiment.

In 1935–1936, after promotion to colonel, he commanded the 15th Infantry Regiment "Savona"; he was later attached to the Army Corps of Naples, and after promotion to brigadier general in December 1937 he assumed command of the infantry of the 13th Infantry Division Re from April 1938 to June 1940. In 1938 he married Chiara Marini, with whom he had two children, Ugo and Alfonsina.

On 10 June 1940, the day of Italy's entry into the Second World War, he assumed command of the 48th Infantry Division Taro, which he commanded uninterruptedly for the entirety of Italy's belligerence against the Allies, participating in the Greco-Italian War from November 1940 to April 1941, in the Italian occupation of Montenegro from June 1941 to August 1942 and in the Italian occupation of France (where the division was stationed near Toulon, with headquarters in Bormes) from November 1942 to September 1943. On January 1, 1941, he was promoted to major general, and in October he was awarded the Knight's Cross of the Military Order of Savoy.

After the Armistice of Cassibile he was taken prisoner by the Germans in France and held as a prisoner of war in Oflag 64/Z in Schokken, Poland, and later in Vittel, France, returning to Italy after the end of the hostilities in May 1945. He was later promoted to lieutenant general; after the war he was included by Yugoslav authorities in a list of war criminals for crimes committed by his troops during anti-partisan operations in Montenegro, but was never prosecuted. He died in San Giovanni del Dosso on 1 January 1973.
