= F-Spot =

Free and open source image manager

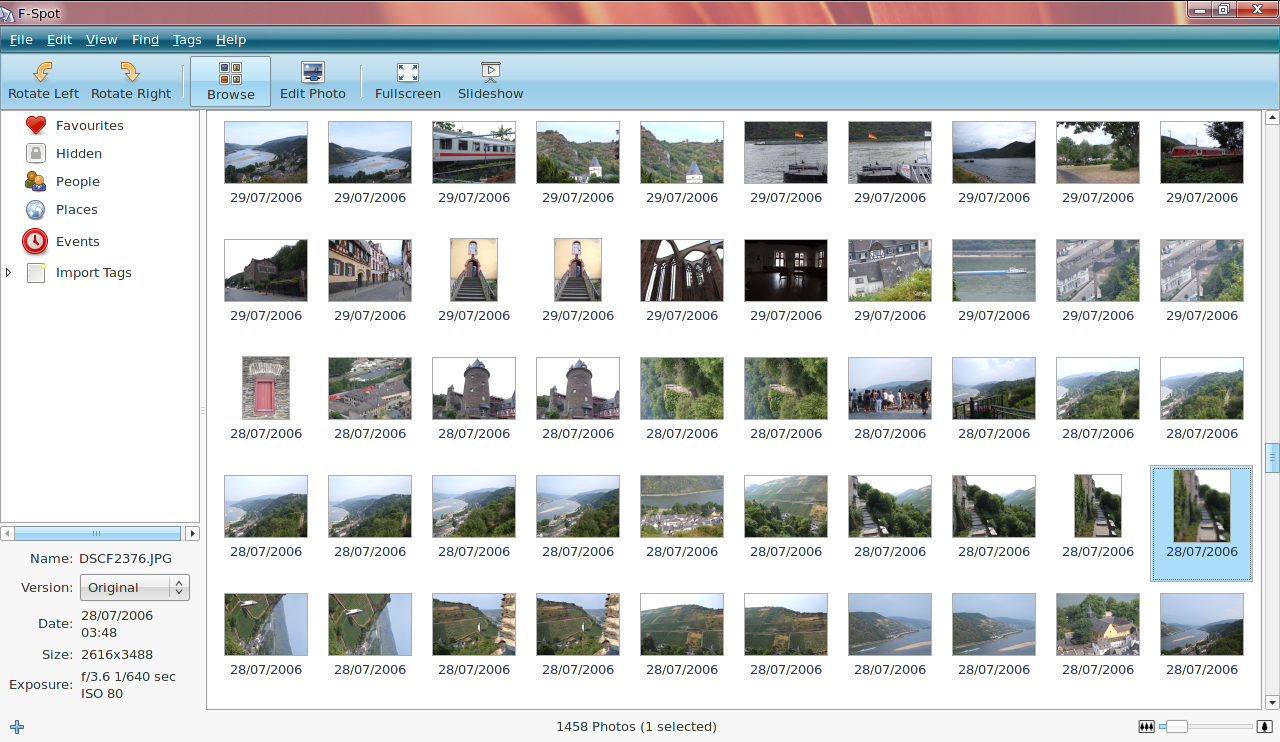
- Browsing images in F-Spot
- Original author: Ettore Perazzoli
- Developers: Larry Ewing, Stephane Delcroix, Gabriel Burt, Ruben Vermeersch, Timothy Howard, Stephen Shaw
- Stable release: 0.8.2 / 19 December 2010; 15 years ago
- Written in: C# (GTK#), C++
- Operating system: Linux
- Platform: Mono, GNOME
- Type: Image organizer
- License: MIT; 0.0.1 to 0.8.2: GPL-2.0-only
- Repository: github.com/f-spot/f-spot

F-Spot is a discontinued image organizer, that was designed to provide personal photo management for the GNOME desktop environment. The name is a play on the word F-Stop. F-Spot can be used for basic photo editing and management.

== History ==
The F-Spot project was started by Ettore Perazzoli and was maintained by Stephen Shaw. F-Spot is written in the C# programming language using Mono.

Before its discontinuation in 2017, F-Spot was the standard image tool for several GNOME based distributions. Before that, Fedora replaced F-Spot with Shotwell in Fedora 13. Ubuntu also replaced it with Shotwell in 10.10 Maverick Meerkat.

== Features ==
F-Spot aimed to have an interface that is simple to use but also facilitates advanced features such as tagging images, and displaying and exporting image metadata in Exif and XMP formats. F-Spot has been noted as being similar to iPhoto.

All major photographic image formats are supported, including JPEG, PNG, TIFF, DNG, GIF, SVG and PPM, as well as several vendor-specific RAW formats (CR2, PEF, ORF, SRF, CRW, MRW and RAF). As of 2008, the RAW formats were not editable with F-Spot. However, newer releases of F-Spot have the DevelopInUFRaw extension, which calls on UFRaw for the conversion work, and then re-imports the resulting JPEG back into F-Spot as a new version of the original RAW.

Photos can be imported directly from the camera. The driver support is provided by libgphoto2. The GNOME desktop environment can also optionally detect if a camera or a memory card has been attached, and import images to F-Spot automatically. Photo CDs can be created by selecting multiple photographs and selecting "Export to CD" from the main menu.

F-Spot has a photo tagging feature which allows for photos to be organized based on user-defined tags or generic pre-included tags such as favorites.

Basic functions such as crop and rotate available alongside more advanced features such as red-eye removal and versioning. The rotate function allows for movements in single degree increments with autocrop, not just 90-degree adjustment. Color adjustments are supported with a histogram. They include an auto-improve and individual brightness, contrast, hue, saturation and temperature.

Photos in the F-Spot library can be uploaded to a number of online photo storage sites. F-Spot exporting to websites such as Flickr, SmugMug, 23hq, and Picasa Web Albums, and also using stand-alone web gallery software, such as Gallery. F-Spot can also generate static web gallery sites and export to Facebook. F-Spot automatically downsizes photos before exporting to Flickr, and though it describes this as "optional," there is no option to not downsize photos before export.

== Technical information ==
When images are imported into F-Spot, they are written to disk. The folder is /username/Pictures/Photos/[year]/[month]/[Day].

== See also ==
- Shotwell – digital photo manager for GNOME
- digiKam – digital photo manager by KDE
- RawTherapee
- Comparison of image viewers
