= Italian governorate of Montenegro =

1941–1943 Italian-occupied area of Yugoslavia

Governorate of Montenegro: Governatorato del Montenegro (Italian); Гувернаторат за Црну Гору (Serbian)
- 1941–1943
- Flag of Italy and local Montenegrin flag Coat of arms

- Montenegro in 1942
- Status: Occupied territory
- Capital: Cettigne; 42°23′22″N 18°55′23″E
- Common languages: Italian, Serbo-Croatian
- Religion: Eastern Orthodoxy; Roman Catholicism; Sunni Islam
- Government: Governorate
  - King: Victor Emmanuel III
- Governor
  - 1941: Serafino Mazzolini (Note: as High Commissioner)
  - 1941–1943: Alessandro Pirzio Biroli
  - 1943: Curio Barbasetti di Prun
- Prime Minister
  - July 1941: Sekula Drljević
- Head of the National Committee
  - 1942–1943: Blažo Đukanović
- Historical era: World War II
  - Italian occupation: 18 April 1941
  - Declaration of independence: 12 July 1941
  - Anti-Italian uprising: 13 July 1941
  - Independence canceled: 24 July 1941
  - Governorate established: 3 October 1941
  - German occupation: 12 September 1943

Population
  - 1941: 411,000
- Currency: Yugoslav dinar Italian lira
Preceded by	Succeeded by
Kingdom of Yugoslavia	German-occupied territory of Montenegro
- Today part of: Montenegro; Serbia

The Italian governorate of Montenegro (Italian: Governatorato del Montenegro) existed from October 1941 to September 1943 as an occupied territory under military government of the Kingdom of Italy during World War II. Although the Italians had intended to establish a quasi-independent Montenegrin kingdom, these plans were permanently shelved after a popular uprising in July 1941. Following the Italian surrender in September 1943, the territory of Montenegro was occupied by German forces which withdrew in December 1944.

== Background ==
Prior to the creation of the Kingdom of Serbs, Croats and Slovenes (KSCS, later renamed the Kingdom of Yugoslavia), Montenegro had been recognised as an independent state for forty years. Immediately prior to the creation of the KSCS in December 1918, the Kingdom of Montenegro was unified with the Kingdom of Serbia and ceased to exist as an independent state. From 1922 onward, as part of the KSCS and then Yugoslavia, Montenegro was not a subdivision of the state. A period of agrarian reform immediately after the First World War resulted in some transfer of population from mountainous areas of Montenegro to other areas of Yugoslavia, including the Macedonian and Kosovo regions. This population movement also achieved a political goal of increasing the Serb population in those areas.

After 1929, the Zeta Banovina (province) of Yugoslavia included all of modern-day Montenegro, as well as adjacent parts of modern-day Serbia, Kosovo, Croatia, and Bosnia and Herzegovina. The capital of the Zeta Banovina was Cetinje. In August 1939, ethnic Croat areas of the Zeta Banovina from the Bay of Kotor to Pelješac including Dubrovnik were merged with a new Banovina of Croatia. The last Ban of Zeta Banovina was Blažo Đukanović, a former brigadier general in the Royal Yugoslav Army. In May 1940, as a means of opposing the government, the Montenegrin branch of the Communist Party of Yugoslavia (Serbo-Croatian: Komunistička partija Jugoslavije, KPJ) advocated that Royal Yugoslav Army reservists demobilise, refuse military discipline, and even desert. In October of that year, the KPJ national conference heavily criticised this action by the Montenegrin branch of the party, and re-oriented the KPJ toward defending the country against "imperialist attackers".

== History ==
=== Invasion ===
In April 1941, as part of the German-led Axis invasion of Yugoslavia, the Zeta Banovina was attacked, by Germans coming from Bosnia and Herzegovina and Italians from Albania. The Italians moved through on 16 April on their way to Dalmatia. The Germans later withdrew, leaving the Italians to occupy the area. The occupation forces initially consisted of the 18th Infantry Division Messina, which was part of the Italian XVII Corps of the 9th Army, which had its headquarters in Albania. The 9th Army was also responsible for those parts of Kosovo and western Macedonia annexed to Albania.

=== Initial occupation ===
On 17 April, the commander of the XVII Corps, Generale di Corpo d'Armata (Lieutenant General) Giuseppe Pafundi received a message from the Italian viceroy in Albania, Francesco Jacomoni, authorising him to set up a new government in Cetinje. The following day he received a further message advising him that a "Committee for the Liberation of Montenegro" had been formed in the Albanian capital, Tirana, and would be basis of a provisional government of Montenegro. On 28 April, Count Serafino Mazzolini was appointed the civil commissioner for Montenegro, but subordinated to the High Command of the Italian Armed Forces in Albania (known as Superalba). Elsewhere in Italian-occupied territories, the installation of a civilian commissioner would usually have been a prelude to annexation, and some laws enacted by the Italians indicate that Montenegro was close to becoming an Italian province. Italian flags were distributed and flown, photographs of Benito Mussolini and the King of Italy were displayed in public offices, and the Fascist Roman salute was made compulsory. Arrangements were made to form Fascist Party organisations, and strict censorship was imposed. Italian bureaucrats were tasked to supervise the finances of public bodies, insurance companies and banks, and all schools were ordered closed until the end of 1941.

On their arrival in Cetinje, the Italian forces had been met by the group of separatists known as "Greens" (Serbo-Croatian: Zelenaši), who called themselves the "Committee for the Liberation of Montenegro". This group was encouraged by the Italians to form a council to advise the occupation authorities, which was established by Mazzolini on 18 May. The "Interim Advisory Committee" was "symbolically vested with civil powers", but the Italian military remained the real decision-makers. The committee was to work alongside the Italian military authorities, who replaced the Zeta Banovina government, but appointed committees for various towns and re-activated the pre-existing bureaucracy. The Committee really only drew support from the "Greens", who overestimated what the Italians were offering for their collaboration. On 22 May, the "Interim Advisory Committee" was dissolved, but the former Yugoslav civil service authorities remained at their posts after they swore an oath of allegiance to Italy. On 19 June, Mazzolini was appointed as "High Commissioner", responsible to the Italian Ministry of Foreign Affairs for matters of civil administration in the occupied territory.

Alliance coat of arms of King Victor Emanuel III and Queen Elena of Montenegro

The Italians were "friendly and lenient" towards the Montenegrins.

Initially, the Italians intended that Montenegro would become an "independent" state closely allied with Italy, reinforced through the strong dynastic links between Italy and Montenegro, as Queen Elena of Italy was a daughter of the last Montenegrin monarch Nicholas I and was born in Cetinje. Benito Mussolini, after he occupied Montenegro, annexed to the Kingdom of Italy the area of Kotor (Italian: Cattaro), where there was a small population of Dalmatian Italians, creating the Province of Cattaro inside the Governorate of Dalmatia.

The English historian Denis Mack Smith wrote that the Queen of Italy (considered the most influential Montenegrin woman in history) convinced her husband the King of Italy Victor Emmanuel III to impose on Mussolini the creation of an independent Montenegro, against the wishes of the fascist Croats and Albanians (who wanted to enlarge their countries with the Montenegrin territories). Her nephew Prince Michael of Montenegro never accepted the offered crown, pledging loyalty to his nephew King Peter II of Yugoslavia.

The Italians were relying heavily on information provided by a group of émigré loyalists of the deposed House of Petrović-Njegoš, that had ruled Montenegro for centuries prior to the union with the Kingdom of Serbia in 1918. They also believed that all members of the "Greens" who had opposed union with Serbia in 1918 wanted full independence for Montenegro, rather than a Montenegrin unit within a federal Yugoslavia. In reality, the "Greens" consisted of two factions, one led by Krsto Popović and one by Sekula Drljević. Popović sought a fully independent Montenegro, but was willing to consider a separate entity within a federal Yugoslavia depending on the outcome of the war, and his group included some members of the Montenegrin Federalist Party. Drljević rejected the idea of the re-formation of Yugoslavia after the war, and was willing to work with the Italians to achieve independence.

=== Dissatisfaction ===
The Montenegrins quickly developed grievances against the Italians. These grievances mainly related to the expulsion of Montenegrin people from the Kosovo region and Bačka and Baranya, as well as the influx of refugees from other parts of Yugoslavia and those fleeing the Ustaše terror in Bosnia and Herzegovina. The Montenegrin people also had grievances against the Italians regarding their annexation of important food-producing territory in Kosovo and a salt producing facility at Ulcinj to Albania, and the economic damage inflicted on many Montenegrins by the temporary removal from circulation of Yugoslav banknotes of 500 dinars and more. There were three reasons the Italians had to be very wary of dissatisfaction among the Montenegrin people, the large number of unsecured military weapons following the collapse of the Yugoslav Army, significant numbers of former Yugoslav Army officers and repatriated following their capture during the invasion, and the strength of the KPJ in the occupied territory. Around 400 former Yugoslav Army officers returned to Montenegro, along with many non-commissioned officers, civil administrators and communists. During the invasion, the Yugoslav Zeta Division, composed mostly of Montenegrins, had briefly counter-attacked into Albania, but had largely returned home with their weapons and equipment following the Yugoslav surrender. In early July 1941, a senior Montenegrin member of the Politburo of the Central Committee of the KPJ, Milovan Đilas, arrived in Montenegro from Belgrade to start the communist struggle against the occupying forces.

=== Declaration of independence ===
Drljević and his colleagues were able to convince the Italians that if they created an independent Montenegro with Italian support, there would be little opposition. In early June 1941, Mazzolini formed a consultative council consisting of 65 Italian-paid deputies who were willing to work with the Italian authorities. In early July, the town and village committees sent their delegates to the National Assembly (Narodna Skupština) in Cetinje in order to "declare the restoration of Montenegro". The declaration would abolish the November 1918 union with Serbia, Montenegro's relationship to the Serb Karađorđević dynasty, and the Yugoslav constitution of 1931. It would also proclaim that Montenegro was a sovereign and independent state ruled by a constitutional monarchy. However, the members of the National Assembly soon realized that the declaration would not result in real independence, but a personal union with the Italian monarchy. Rather than accept this, nearly all of the delegates returned to their towns and villages.

No member of the Petrović-Njegoš dynasty was willing to accept the throne, so the National Assembly decided to establish a "Regency" under the nominal rule of Italian King Victor Emmanuel III. The declaration was passed by acclamation on 12 July. Initially there were manifestations of approval in the main cities of Montenegro, but in the country's interior the feelings were different.

So, on July 12 of 1941, was officially created a "Client-State" of the kingdom of Italy and the Governorate of Montenegro was cancelled (at least temporarily).

=== Uprising ===
On 13 July 1941, there was a general uprising against the Italians, initiated by the Montenegrin branch of the KPJ. The event that triggered the uprising was the proclamation on the previous day of a restored Kingdom of Montenegro headed by an Italian regent and led by Montenegrin separatist Drljević and the "Greens". The insurgents also included large numbers of Serb nationalists known as "Whites" (bjelaši), who "stood for close ties to Serbia", and former Yugoslav Army officers, some of whom had recently been released from prisoner-of-war camps. Officers were in command with the communists doing the organisation and providing political commissars. Serbs fleeing the Ustaše terror in Herzegovina played a significant part in the uprising. The rebels seized control of small towns and villages in the early phase of the uprising. Amidst the worst of the fighting during the successful attack he led on Berane, then-Captain Pavle Đurišić distinguished himself, and emerged as one of the main commanders of the uprising. During the attack on Berane, Đurišić fought alongside communist insurgent forces. The other main commanders included the former Yugoslav Army officers Colonel Bajo Stanišić and Major Đorđije Lašić. The Italians were caught completely unprepared, and within a few days, Cetinje had been completely isolated from the rest of the occupied territory, and the occupation force had to call for support from its higher headquarters in Albania. The Italian Foreign Minister, Count Galeazzo Ciano was shocked by the uprising, and was concerned about the ability of the Italian Army to suppress it.

The uprising was premature, and a force of 67,000 Italian troops regained control over all towns and communication routes within six weeks, assisted by Muslim and Albanian irregular forces from border areas who provided flank security. The commander of the Italian 9th Army based in Albania, Generale d’Armata (General) Alessandro Pirzio Biroli, placed the commander of the XIV Corps, Generale d'Corpo Armata (Lieutenant General) Luigi Mentasti in command of all Italian forces in Montenegro, and gave him orders to crush the revolt. Pirzio Biroli directed his forces to avoid "acts of revenge and useless cruelty". Nevertheless, in crushing the revolt dozens of villages were burned, hundreds were killed and between 10,000 and 20,000 inhabitants were interned. For a while, the Muslim and Albanian irregulars were permitted to pillage and torch villages. For the first few months after the uprising began, the insurgent groups included KPJ members and their followers as well as Serb nationalists, and the leadership of the groups was also mixed. Unlike the Partisans who had strong central direction from the outset, during these early stages the nationalists in Montenegro had little or no contact with the headquarters of Draža Mihailović, who would eventually become the titular leader of the Chetnik movement in Yugoslavia. Outside of coordination provided by KPJ members, the nationalists did not necessarily work together, even with those in the neighbouring district. Their motivation for fighting was mainly to protect their families.

A split then developed between the communist leaders of the uprising and the nationalists that had participated. The nationalists recognized that the uprising had been defeated and wanted to stop fighting, unlike the Partisans who were determined to continue the struggle. During the autumn the nationalists contacted the Italians and offered to assist them to fight the Partisans. Subsequently, the nationalists, including Đurišić who was popular in his own Vasojević clan of northern Montenegro, withdrew into the hinterland. The focus of the nationalists such as Đurišić was to avoid provoking the Italians but to protect the mountain villages if they were attacked. In northern Montenegro, there was a marked distinction between the communists and nationalists, with the nationalists having closer ties with Serbia and a "frontier" mentality towards Muslims. The communists wanted to continue with the revolution by turning against their class enemies, whilst Ustaše manipulation of the Muslims in the Sandžak and the expulsion of Serbs from the areas annexed by Albania combined to make Đurišić and his Chetniks impatient to continue with the uprising by turning on the Muslims and Albanians in the region. The uprising continued to a reduced extent until December 1941.

As a result of the uprising, the Italians decided to abolish Mazzolini's position as High Commissioner. On 3 October 1941, the territory was retitled the Governatorato del Montenegro, and Biroli was appointed governor with responsibility for both military and civil affairs. On 1 December, the XIV Corps was redesignated the Command of the Troops of Montenegro.

=== Chetnik commanders for Montenegro ===
In early November 1941, a split developed between the Chetniks and Partisans in the Territory of the Military Commander in Serbia. The leader of the Chetniks in that territory was Mihailović, who would enjoy the support of the Yugoslav government-in-exile. Once the Montenegrin nationalists heard about the split between Mihailović's Chetniks and the Partisans, there was an increased impetus for them to collaborate with the Italian occupation forces. On 20 December 1941, Mihailović appointed Đurišić as his commander of all regular and reserve troops in central and eastern Montenegro and parts of the Sandžak. Đurišić's appointment occurred when he travelled to Serbia in late December 1941 and early January 1942 to meet with Mihailović, and returned with detailed instructions which bore Mihailović's signature. These instructions included directives for "cleansing the Muslim population from Sandžak and the Muslim and Croat populations from Bosnia and Herzegovina" amongst other orders. Historians Lucien Karchmar, Stevan K. Pavlowitch and Noel Malcolm believe that the document was a forgery made by Đurišić after he failed to reach Mihailović, who, because German forces in Serbia had mounted an operation targeting Mihailović's forces, had been driven out of Ravna Gora. In contrast, historians Matteo J. Milazzo, Jozo Tomasevich and Sabrina P. Ramet consider the document to be authentic and attribute the instructions to Mihailović.

Despite his possession of these instructions, Đurišić initially had very little influence on the non-communist elements of the Montenegrin resistance and was unable to develop an effective strategy against the Italians or Partisans in the first few months after his return to Montenegro. In early 1942, his Chetnik detachment became more active, especially in eastern Montenegro and the Sandžak against local Muslims.

=== "Leftist errors" ===
The Partisans occupied Kolašin in January and February 1942, and turned against all real and potential opposition, killing about 300 of the population and throwing their mangled corpses into pits they called the "dogs' cemetery". Due to this and other examples of communist terror, the Montenegrin population turned against the Partisans. Đurišić soon recaptured Kolašin and held it as a Chetnik bastion until May 1943. According to other sources, the number of persons killed in Kolašin at that time was between 16 and 38.

=== Collaboration with Italians ===
In the autumn of 1941, the nationalists contacted the Italian occupation forces offering to assist the Italians to fight the Partisans. In early February, Bajo Stanišić withdrew two units under his command from the insurgent front-line around Danilovgrad in central Montenegro, allowing the besieged Italians to break out and defeat the Partisans. Soon after, Stanišić helped the Italians to re-take Nikšić. By mid-February 1942, individual Chetnik units were concluding formal agreements to cooperate with the Italians. The first agreement was between Stanišić and the commander of the 48th Infantry Division Taro, and was effective from 17 February. Soon after, Đurišić entered into an agreement with Biroli regarding collaboration between Đurišić's Chetniks and the Italians in the area of operations of the 19th Infantry Division Venezia. On 6 March, an agreement was signed between Stanišić and Biroli. These agreements related to Chetnik action against the Partisans, for which they would receive arms and supplies from the Italians. The Italian's primary aim in entering into these agreements was to minimise their own losses. Initially, Stanišić referred to his forces as the "Montenegrin National Army", and claimed to be the Chetnik commander for both Montenegro and Herzegovina. In late February or early March, Mihailović sent one of his agents to join Stanišić, who began to coordinate his activities with the other significant Chetnik leaders in Montenegro. On 9 March, a large group of former Royal Yugoslav Army officers met at Cetinje and elected Blažo Đukanović to command all nationalist forces in Montenegro. The election of Đukanović was accepted by Mihailović, and may have even been suggested by him.

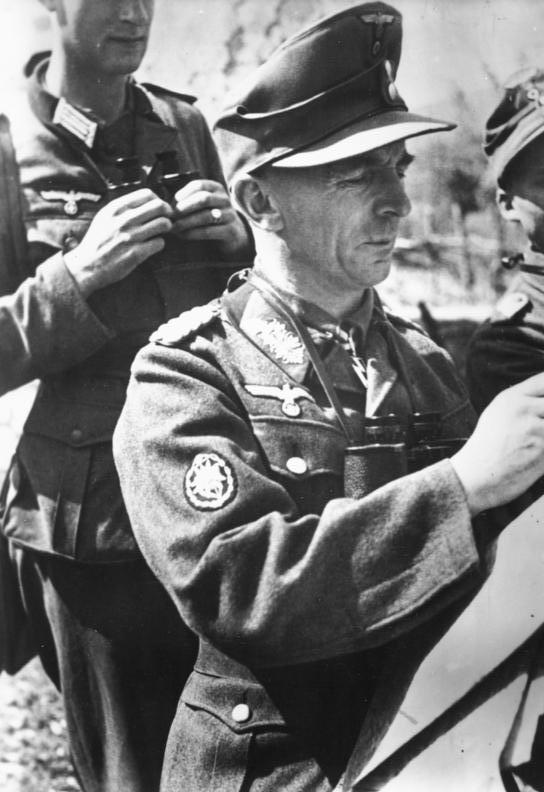
German mountain forces in Montenegro, June 1943

Between March and June 1942, the power of the Chetniks increased in Montenegro due to a combination of factors. Their agreements with the Italians was the first of these, along with the arms and supplies that accompanied the agreements. The other factor was the weakening of the Partisans, which was mainly caused by the impact of the "left errors". During this period, Stanišić's Chetniks fought the Partisans in the Nikšić area alongside the Italians, and Đurišić's Chetniks did likewise in the Kolašin district of northern Montenegro. In May, Đurišić's Chetniks defeated the Durmitor Partisan Detachment, which was the last large Partisan unit remaining in Montenegro. On 24 July 1942, a comprehensive agreement was reached between Đukanović and Biroli, which expanded the areas covered and ensured that the Chetniks in Montenegro could bear the brunt of the fighting against the Partisans. Specifically, the Đukanović-Biroli agreement stated that "the Chetniks were to continue uncompromising struggle against the Communists and were to cooperate with the Italian authorities in the restoration and maintenance of law and order". It mandated the creation of three "flying detachments" of 1,500 men each, commanded by Đurišić, Stanišić and the separatist leader Popović, and covered pay, rations, arms and support for their families. These detachments were already in existence and had been integrated with Italian forces during operations against the Partisans in June. The agreement also endorsed the pre-existing Committee of Montenegrin Nationalists led by Đukanović. The agreement stated that the nationalists had no political agenda except fighting communism and maintaining law and order and the well-being of the Montenegrin population. The conclusion of the agreement obligated Đukanović's Committee to do everything in its power to preserve order and to fight anyone opposing the Italian occupiers. Tomasevich states that given Mihailović had been in Montenegro for two months prior to this agreement being concluded, it is fair to assume that he knew about and was satisfied with it, and Milazzo states that these accommodations with the Italians were sought with Mihailović's personal approval. This agreement was consistent with Mihailović's aim of having an "army-in-waiting", that could turn against the occupiers, and with the support of the Western Allies, bring him to power. He had taken a similar approach with the "legalised Chetniks" in German-occupied Serbia.

The Chetniks were important to the Italian occupiers as they controlled the hinterland and allowed the Italians to concentrate on maintaining law and order in the larger towns and on the major routes in the occupied territory. From June 1942 until around April 1943, the Chetniks controlled a very large part of the occupied territory. In addition to the 3,000 Chetniks in the two "flying detachments", the Montenegrin Chetniks had several times that number who were not "legalised" by the Italians, but were engaged in fighting the Partisans. Popović, the Montenegrin separatist leader and commander of the third "flying detachment", had been collaborating with the Italians from the time of the invasion, and continued to do so, having reached a fragile understanding with the Chetniks during the first half of 1942. Both the Chetniks and separatists tried to get as much support as possible from the Italians, which included the importation of food for the population who supported them.

=== Šahovići conference ===
Between 30 November and 2 December 1942, Chetniks from Montenegro and Sandžak met at a conference in the village of Šahovići near Bijelo Polje. Three Chetnik commanders, Zaharije Ostojić, Đorđije Lašić and Pavle Đurišić represented Mihailović, and the proceedings bore an official stamp. The conference was dominated by Đurišić and its resolutions expressed extremism and intolerance, as well as an agenda which focused on restoring the pre-war status quo in Yugoslavia implemented in its initial stages by a Chetnik dictatorship. It also laid claim to parts of the territory of Yugoslavia's neighbours.

=== Italian capitulation ===
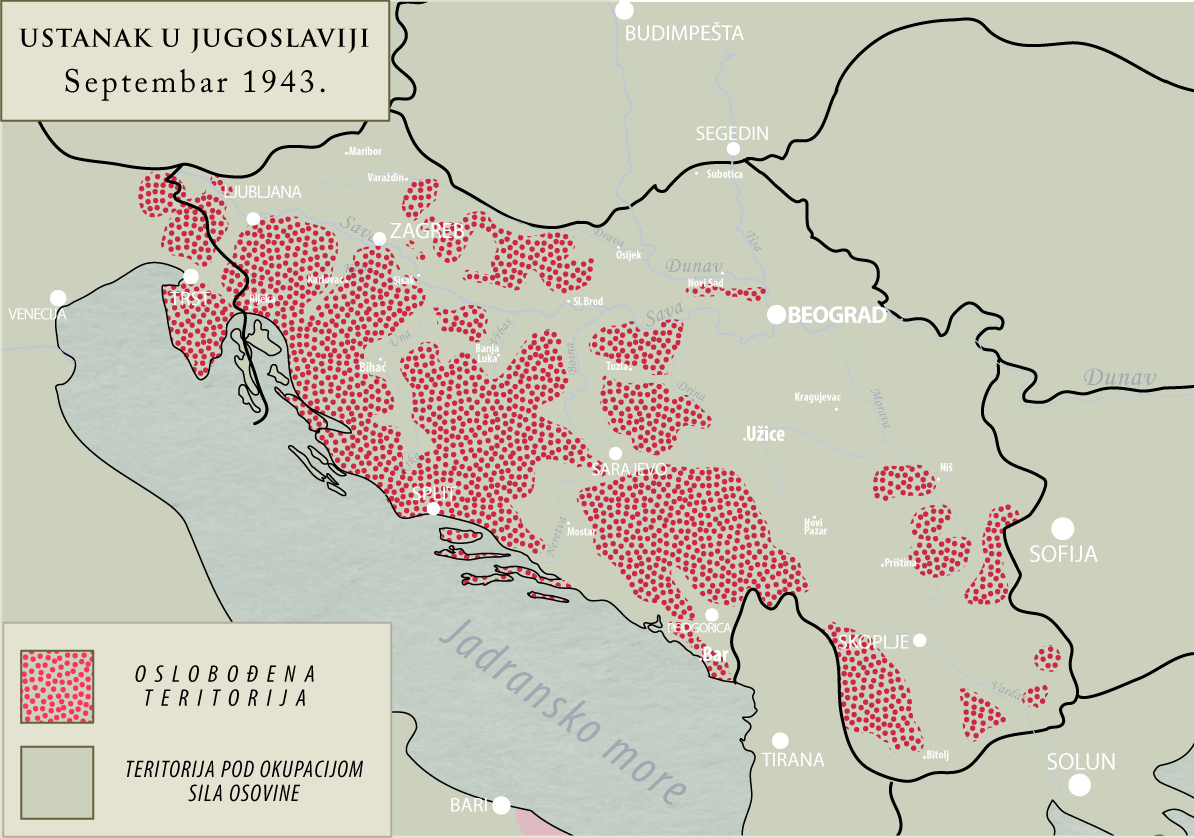
Uprising in Axis-occupied Yugoslavia (including occupied territory of Montenegro) after capitulation of Italy in September 1943

On 3 September 1943 (but not made public until the 8th), the Italians concluded an armistice with the Allies, leaving 17 divisions stranded in Yugoslavia. All divisional commanders refused to join the Germans. Two Italian infantry divisions joined the Montenegrin Partisans as complete units, while another joined the Albanian Partisan forces. Other units surrendered to the Germans to face imprisonment in Germany or summary execution. Others surrendered themselves, arms, ammunition and equipment to Croatian forces or to the Partisans, simply disintegrated, or reached Italy on foot via Trieste or by ship across the Adriatic. The territory of the former Italian governorate of Montenegro was placed under Nazi German occupation.

== Demographics ==
By 31 July 1941, the population of the occupied territory was estimated at 411,000.

== Geography ==
The occupied territory of Montenegro was far smaller in area than pre-Yugoslav Montenegro. At its core was a small area running south into the Sandžak from Berane, including the towns of Prijepolje, Bijelo Polje, Sjenica, and some villages around Tutin and Rožaje, incorporating a Muslim minority numbering 80,000. The Bay of Kotor was annexed as part of the Italian Governorate of Dalmatia, and the border between the Independent State of Croatia and Montenegro followed the Lim in the Drina region as far as Hum, then via Dobricevo to the Adriatic. Along its coastline and southeastern borders, Montenegro lost Metohija to Albania, including Bar, a strip of land north of Lake Scutari, the town of Ulcinj, an area northeast of Podgorica along the Yugoslav-Albanian border, and a significant amount of the Andrijevica district including Plav and Gusinje.

Western and central Kosovo were also annexed to Albania, including the towns of Prizren, Dragaš and Pristina. Kosovska Mitrovica and the Ibar River valley were incorporated into the German-occupied territory of Serbia, including the towns of Kukavica, Podujevo and Medveđa, and the Trepča zinc mines. Also included in the German-occupied territory of Serbia was the eastern Sandžak, incorporating Novi Pazar. In addition to the modifications to the western border mentioned above, some of the western Sandžak, Foča and Čajniče were included in the NDH.

== Administration ==
The territory was initially under military occupation, but the Italians initially intended to make Montenegro a so-called independent state with close links to Italy, and appointed Mazzolini as a commissioner to handle civil affairs. After the abortive declaration of independence and the suppression of the resulting uprising, Biroli was appointed governor of the territory, which was known as the Governorate of Montenegro (Italian: Governatorato del Montenegro). Biroli and his successor Count Curio Barbasetti di Prun were in full control of all military and civil matters in the territory. For purposes of civil administration, the existing districts and municipalities of the Yugoslav system were retained "to avert administrative chaos", with Italians replacing authority at the Banovina level.

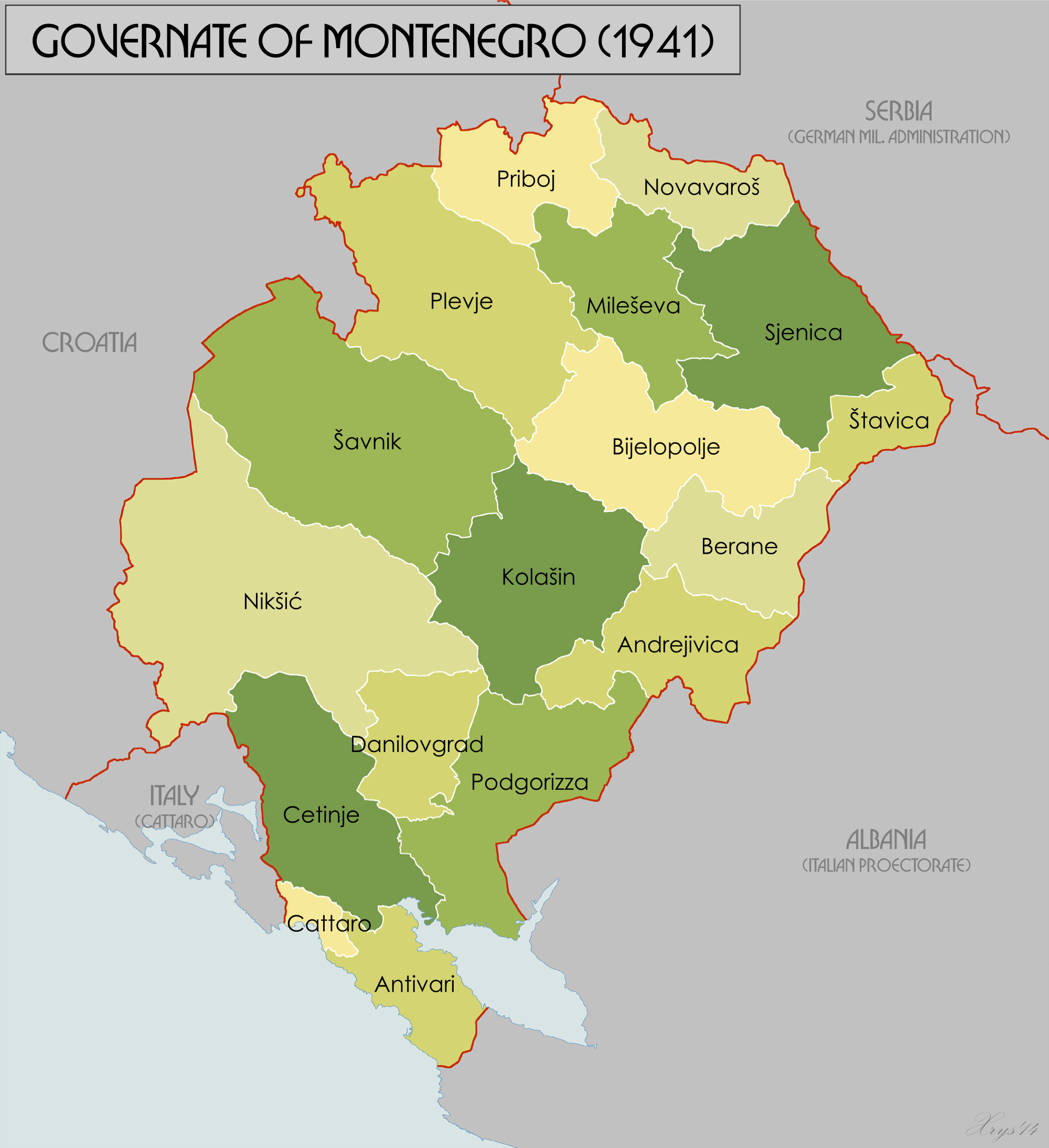
Administrative map of the Italian Governate of Montenegro (1941)

=== Districts ===
The administration consisted of the following districts, which retained the pre-existing Yugoslav civil service. (Note: italics indicates only part of the old Yugoslav district was within the governate.)

- Antivari (Bar)
- Andrijevica
- Berane
- Bijelopolje
- Cattaro (Kotor)
- Cetinje
- Danilovgrad
- Kolašin
- Mileševa
- Nikšić
- Novavaroš
- Plevje (Pljevja)
- Podgorizza (Podgorica)
- Priboj
- Šavnik
- Sjenica
- Štavica

=== Italian Governors in Montenegro ===
- Count Serafino Mazzolini (28 April 1941 – 23 July 1941) (as High Commissioner)
- General Alessandro Pirzio Biroli (23 July 1941 – 13 July 1943)
- General Curio Barbasetti di Prun (13 July 1943 – 10 September 1943)

=== Heads of National Administrative Committees ===
Heads of various collaborationist National Administrative Committees within Italian governorate of Montenegro.

- Sekula Drljević (12 July 1941 – 3 October 1941, de jure) (as the President of the Governing Committee)
- Blažo Đukanović (24 July 1942 – 19 October 1943) (as the Head of the National Committee)

== Occupation forces ==
The 13 July – 12 August uprising was suppressed by Luigi Mentasti's XIV Corps, consisting of the 19th Infantry Division "Venezia", 18th Infantry Division Messina, 5th Alpine Division Pusteria, 48th Infantry Division Taro and 22nd Infantry Division Cacciatori delle Alpi. The Cacciatori delle Alpi division was re-deployed to the NDH in September 1941, but the rest remained as a strengthened occupation force until December 1941, during which they fought off local attacks.

From 1 December 1941 to 15 May 1943, XIV Corps was designated Montenegro Command, and was headquartered in Podgorica. In October 1942, Montenegro Command controlled over 75,000 troops. These included the garrison of the Bay of Kotor, which was formally part of the 2nd Army, but was under the operational control of Montenegro Command. On 15 May 1943, Montenegro Command was combined with the 9th Army and the 2nd Army's VI Corps to form Army Group East, but the deployment of the occupying forces did not change significantly for the remainder of the Italian occupation. The uprising and later developments showed that the Italians were not able to effectively impose their rule outside of the larger cities.

Garrison formations
Occupation zone	Period	Division	Notes
Northern zone	48th Infantry Division Taro	December 1941 – August 1942	included Čekanje and Bar in the Southern zone
Northern zone	151st Infantry Division Perugia	August 1942 – September 1943	included Čekanje and Bar in the Southern zone
Eastern zone	19th Infantry Division Venezia	December 1941 – September 1943	HQ: Berane
Southern zone	5th Alpine Division Pusteria	December 1941 – August 1942	HQ: Pljevlja, with garrisons at Nova Varoš, Priboj, and in the NDH at Foča, Goražde and Višegrad
Southern zone	1st Alpine Division Taurinense	August 1942 – September 1943	as above, less Višegrad garrison which was replaced by German forces in December 1942
Kotor zone	18th Infantry Division Messina	December 1941 – February 1942	HQ: Castelnuovo
Kotor zone	155th Infantry Division Emilia	February 1942 – May 1943	—
Kotor zone	23rd Infantry Division Ferrara	May 1943 – September 1943	—
Northwestern zone	6th Alpine Division Alpi Graie	March – November 1942	between Danilovgrad, Nikšić and Šavnik

The occupation was a significant drain on the Italians as, despite the strategic importance of the adjacent Bay of Kotor as a naval base, and Montenegro's position on the route into the central Balkans, it was a food-deficit area into which they had to import 1,200–1,500 metric tons of foodstuffs every month.

== Religion ==
The predominant religion in Montenegro was Eastern Orthodoxy. There was also a significant Sunni Islamic population and a smaller Roman Catholic one. Since the Metropolitanate of Montenegro unified with the Serbian Orthodox Church in 1920, the Serbian Orthodox Church was the dominant church among Montenegrins, divided into the Metropolitanate of Montenegro and the Littoral and the Eparchy of Budimlje-Nikšić, both led by Joanikije Lipovac. Lipovac was killed in the aftermath of the war by the Partisans after trying to flee Yugoslavia in 1945. The Catholic Church was divided into two dioceses, the Roman Catholic Archdiocese of Bar and the Roman Catholic Diocese of Skopje.

== Bibliography ==
- Burgwyn, H. James (2005). Empire on the Adriatic: Mussolini's Conquest of Yugoslavia 1941–1943. New York: Enigma Books. ISBN 978-1-929631-35-3.
- Caccamo, Francesco; Monzali, Luciano (2008). L'occupazione italiana della Iugoslavia, 1941–1943 (in Italian). Florence, Italy: Le Lettere. ISBN 978-88-6087-113-8.
- Đilas, Milovan (1980). Wartime. Translated by Michael B. Petrovich. New York: Houghton Mifflin Harcourt. ISBN 978-0-15-694712-1.
- Fleming, Thomas (2002). Montenegro: The Divided Land. Rockford, Illinois: Chronicles Press. ISBN 978-0-9619364-9-5.
- Karchmar, Lucien (1987). Draža Mihailović and the Rise of the Četnik Movement, 1941–1945. New York: Garland Publishing. ISBN 978-0-8240-8027-3.
- Lemkin, Raphael (2008). Axis Rule in Occupied Europe. Clark, New Jersey: The Lawbook Exchange. ISBN 978-1-58477-901-8. Archived from the original on 2023-01-14.
- Malcolm, Noel (1994). Bosnia: A Short History. New York: New York University Press. ISBN 978-0-8147-5520-4.
- Milazzo, Matteo J. (1975). The Chetnik Movement & the Yugoslav Resistance. Baltimore, Maryland: Johns Hopkins University Press. ISBN 978-0-8018-1589-8.
- Morrison, Kenneth (2009). Montenegro: A Modern History. New York: I.B. Tauris. ISBN 978-1-84511-710-8.
- Pajović, Radoje (1977). Kontrarevolucija u Crnoj Gori: Četnički i federalistički pokret 1941–1945 (in Serbo-Croatian). Cetinje, Yugoslavia: Obod.
- Pavlićević, Veselin-Mitko (2014). "Lijeve greške" Milovana Đilasa ili partijski silogizam ["Leftist errors" of Milovan Đilas, or Party Syllogism] (PDF) (in Serbo-Croatian) (Ličnost i djelo Milovana Đilasa; Zbornik radova s međunarodnog naučnog simpozijuma ed.). Nikšić: Filozofski fakultet Nikšić. ISBN 978-86-7798-082-5. Archived from the original (PDF) on 2016-03-03.
- Pavlowitch, Stevan K. (2007). Hitler's New Disorder: The Second World War in Yugoslavia. New York: Columbia University Press. ISBN 978-1-85065-895-5. Archived from the original on 2023-02-13.
- Ramet, Sabrina P. (2006). The Three Yugoslavias: State-Building and Legitimation, 1918–2005. Bloomington, Indiana: Indiana University Press. ISBN 978-0-253-34656-8. Archived from the original on 2023-01-12.
- Rodogno, Davide (2006). Fascism's European Empire: Italian Occupation During the Second World War. Cambridge: Cambridge University Press. ISBN 978-0-521-84515-1. Archived from the original on 2023-02-15.
- Tanner, Marcus (1997). Croatia: A Nation Forged in War. New Haven, Connecticut: Yale University Press. ISBN 978-0-300-06933-4.
- Thomas, Nigel; Mikulan, Krunoslav (1995). Axis Forces in Yugoslavia 1941–45. New York: Osprey Publishing. ISBN 978-1-85532-473-2.
- Tomasevich, Jozo (1975). War and Revolution in Yugoslavia, 1941–1945: The Chetniks. Stanford, California: Stanford University Press. ISBN 978-0-8047-0857-9.
- Tomasevich, Jozo (2001). War and Revolution in Yugoslavia, 1941–1945: Occupation and Collaboration. Stanford, California: Stanford University Press. ISBN 978-0-8047-3615-2. Archived from the original on 2023-01-12.
- Velkonija, Mitja (2003). Religious Separation and Political Intolerance in Bosnia-Herzegovina. College Station, Texas: Texas A&M University Press. ISBN 978-1-58544-226-3. Archived from the original on 2016-04-30.
- Roberts, Elizabeth (2007). Realm of the Black Mountain: A History of Montenegro. Ithaca, New York: Cornell University Press. ISBN 978-0-8014-4601-6.
