= Arboretum du Ruscas =

Arboretum in Provence-Alpes-Côte d'Azur, France

The Arboretum du Ruscas is an arboretum located in the Domaine de Ruscas (Forêt du Dom) in Bormes-les-Mimosas, Var, Provence-Alpes-Côte d'Azur, France. The arboretum was created in 1977, and contains 15 specimens representing 11 varieties of trees including Pinus radiata and Quercus ithaburensis.

== See also ==
- List of botanical gardens in France
