= Arboretum de Gratteloup =

Arboretum in Provence-Alpes-Côte d'Azur, France

Coordinates: 43.17°N 6.334°E

The Arboretum de Gratteloup (1 hectare) is an arboretum located in the Forêt du Dom near Bormes-les-Mimosas, Var, Provence-Alpes-Côte d'Azur, France. It is open daily without charge.

The arboretum was created in 1935 by the Office National des Forêts (ONF) and expanded in the late 1980s. It is dedicated to experimental forestry and conservation, and contains both local and exotic specimens, including endangered species. In 2005 the arboretum contained 197 conifer species and 268 species of deciduous trees, with walking paths and explanatory signs.

== See also ==
- List of botanical gardens in France
