= Pieraccini =

Pieraccini (Italian pronunciation: [pjeratˈtʃiːni]) is an Italian surname derived from the given name Piero, originating in Tuscany and Forlì. Notable people with the surname include:

- Carmen Pieraccini (born 1979), Scottish actress
- Gaetano Pieraccini (1864–1957), Italian physician and politician
- Giovanni Pieraccini (1918–2017), Italian journalist and politician
- Leonetta Cecchi Pieraccini (1882–1977), Italian painter
- Roberto Pieraccini (born 1955), Italian electrical engineer

== See also ==
- Pieraccioni
- Pirazzoli
- Perazzoli
