= 48th Infantry Division "Taro" =

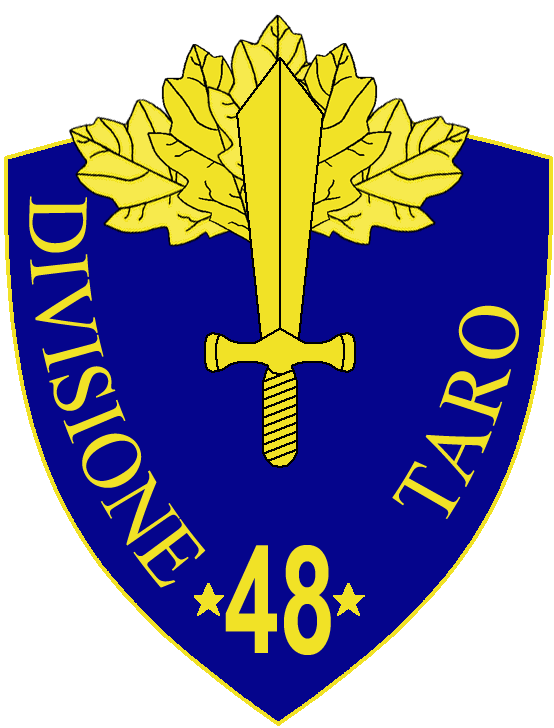
- 48th Infantry Division "Taro" insignia
- Active: 1939–1943
- Country: Kingdom of Italy
- Branch: Royal Italian Army
- Type: Infantry
- Size: Division
- Garrison/HQ: Catanzaro
- Engagements: World War II

Commanders
- Notable commanders: General Gino Pedrazzoli

Insignia
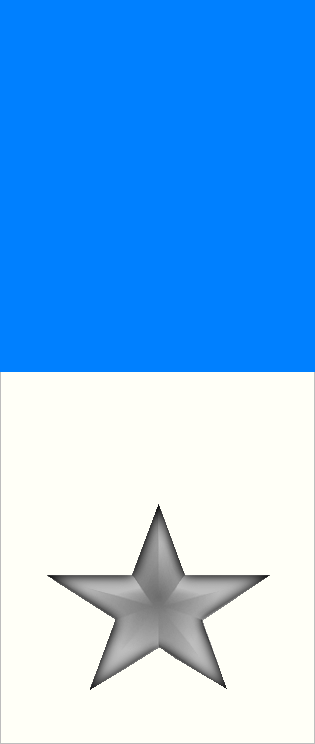
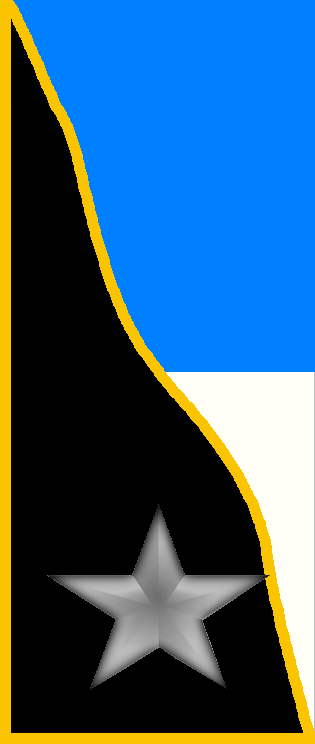
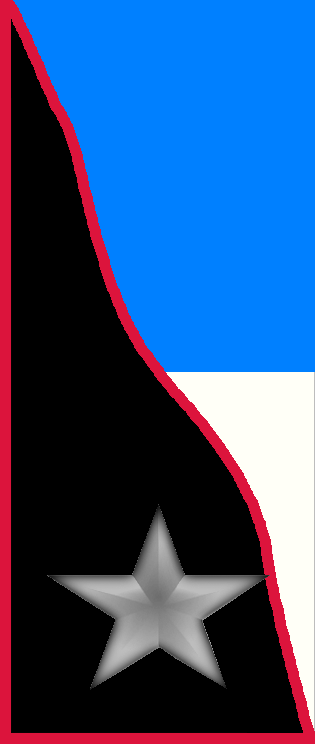
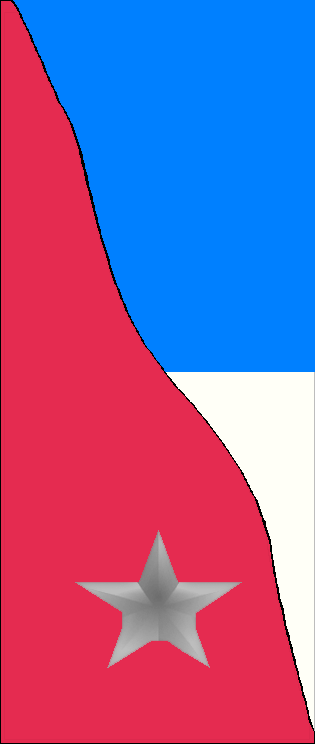
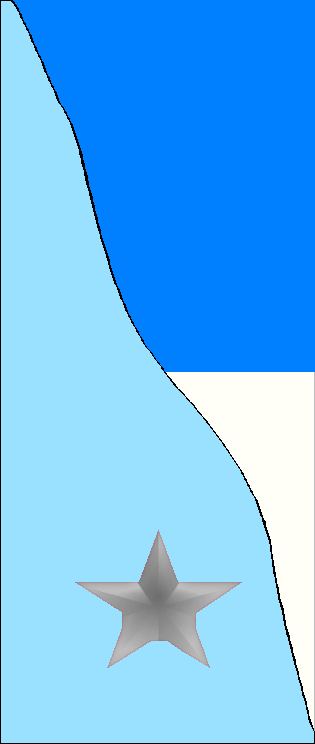
- Identification symbol: Taro Division gorget patches

The 48th Infantry Division "Taro" (Italian: 48ª Divisione di fanteria "Taro") was an infantry division of the Royal Italian Army during World War II. The Taro was formed on 12 September 1939 in Catanzaro and named for the river Taro. After the Armistice of Cassibile the division disbanded on 8 September 1943 in Toulon, France.

== History ==
=== World War I ===
The division's lineage begins with the Brigade "Taro" established during World War I in Verona on 6 April 1916. The brigade consisted of the 207th and 208th infantry regiments. The brigade fought on the Italian front until it was destroyed during the Battle of Caporetto. The brigade and its two regiments were declared lost on 21 November 1917. The brigade was reformed in February 1918 and served for the remainder of the war. After the war's end the brigade and its two regiments were disbanded in February 1919.

On 12 September 1939 the 48th Infantry Division "Taro" was activated Catanzaro and received its two reactivated namesake infantry regiments and the reformed 48th Artillery Regiment "Taro". The division was housed in the barracks of the 27th Infantry Division "Brescia", which had been transferred to Zawiya in Libya in summer 1939. In October 1939 the division moved to Macomer in Sardinia. In May 1940 it returned to its bases in Calabria.

=== World War II ===
On 10 June 1940 Italy entered World War II. At that time the Taro was in Civitavecchia and saw no action during the Italian invasion of France. On 19 November 1940 the division began to move to Bari from where it was shipped to Albania to reinforce the crumbling Italian front in the Greco-Italian War. The division's first units disembarked in Durrës on 27 November 1940 and by 30 November 1940 the entire division was in Albania. From 1 December 1940 the 207th Infantry Regiment "Taro" was attached to the 19th Infantry Division "Venezia" near Pogradec, while the 208th Infantry Regiment "Taro" was attached to the 53rd Infantry Division "Arezzo". In the meantime the Taro's divisional headquarters organized defences in the Shkumbin river valley with units from shattered Italian formations. On 11 December 1940 the Taro, with the 225th Infantry Regiment "Arezzo" replacing the 207th Infantry Regiment "Taro", entered the frontline at Guri i Llengës - Shkumbin line. The Taro's position was never broken, although pressure from Greek units increased in January - February 1941, resulting in some lost positions near Guri i Llengës, which were re-captured 14 February 1941. The last major Greek attack came on 20 February 1941. On by 6 March 1941 the Taro was on the offensive, capturing Guri i Topit and other peaks by 8 March. The division remained in its positions until the end of the Battle of Greece on 23 April 1941.

In June 1941 the Taro was transferred to Montenegro with garrisons in Cetinje, Bar, Nikšić and Danilovgrad. On 19 July 1941 an additional garrison was established in Kotor. In 1942, the division conducted anti-partisan raids at Budva, Velja Gora, Boguti and Čisto Polje. In February–March 1942, an especially large group of Yugoslav Partisans was beaten off at Bokovo. In August 1942, the division was called back to Italy, and stationed in the Alessandria-Novi Ligure area. In November 1942 the Taro participated in the occupation of Vichy France. The Taro remained in France, tasked with occupation duties to the north of Toulon and along a coastal strip to the east, from Cape Brun to Cavalaire-sur-Mer. Its headquarters was in Hyères and its main garrisons were in Cuers, Méounes-lès-Montrieux, Pierrefeu-du-Var and Carnoules. After the announcement of the Armistice of Cassibile between Italy and the Allies the division was disbanded by German forces.

== Organization ==
48th Infantry Division "Taro" organization in 1940

- 48th Infantry Division "Taro", in Catanzaro
  - Headquarters
    - Command Company
    - 93rd Carabinieri Section
    - 98th Carabinieri Section
    - 48th Field Post Office
    - 48th Infantry Division Command Transport Squad
  - 207th Infantry Regiment "Taro", in Catanzaro
    - Command Company
    - 3 × Fusilier battalions
    - Support Weapons Battery (65/17 mod. 13 infantry support guns)
    - Mortar Company (81mm mod. 35 mortars)
  - 208th Infantry Regiment "Taro", in Reggio Calabria
    - Command Company
    - 3 × Fusilier battalions
    - Support Weapons Battery (65/17 mod. 13 infantry support guns)
    - Mortar Company (81mm mod. 35 mortars)
  - 48th Artillery Regiment "Taro", in Nola
    - Command Unit
    - I Group (100/17 mod. 14 howitzers; re-equipped in November 1940 with 75/13 mod. 15 mountain guns)
    - II Group (75/27 mod. 11 field guns; re-equipped in November 1940 with 75/13 mod. 15 mountain guns)
    - III Group (75/13 mod. 15 mountain guns)
    - 1 × Anti-aircraft battery (20/65 mod. 35 anti-aircraft guns)
    - Ammunition and Supply Unit
  - XLVIII Mortar Battalion (81mm mod. 35 mortars)
  - XLVIII Mixed Engineer Battalion (formed in 1943)
  - CCVII Replacements Battalion (joined the division in Albania)
  - CCVIII Replacements Battalion (joined the division in Albania)
  - 48th Anti-tank Company (47/32 mod. 35 anti-tank guns)
  - 11th Engineer Company (entered the XLVIII Mixed Engineer Battalion in 1943)
  - 48th Telegraph and Radio Operators Company (entered the XLVIII Mixed Engineer Battalion in 1943)
  - 58th Medical Section
    - 222nd Field Hospital
    - 237th Field Hospital
    - 1 × Surgical unit
  - 58th Supply Section
  - 48th Autocarrette Section
  - 64th Train Unit (equipped with mules; assigned to the division in Albania)
  - 848th Transport Section

Attached to the division from 1941 to early 1942:

- 164th CC.NN. Legion "Corridoni"
  - CLXIII CC.NN. Battalion (remained attached to the division until September 1943)
  - CLXIV CC.NN. Battalion
  - 164th CC.NN. Machine Gun Company

Attached to the division in 1943:

- 168th Coastal Regiment
  - XL Alpini Battalion "Monte Maiella"
  - DXIV Mobile Territorial Alpini Battalion

== Commanding officers ==
The division's commanding officers were:

- Generale di Divisione Luigi Chiolini (12 September 1939 - 9 June 1940)
- Generale di Divisione Gino Pedrazzoli (10 June 1940 - 9 September 1943)

== CROWCASS ==
The names of four men attached to the division can be found in the Central Registry of War Criminals and Security Suspects (CROWCASS) set up by the Anglo-American Supreme Headquarters Allied Expeditionary Force in 1945. The names can be found at: Central Registry of War Criminals and Security Suspects from the Kingdom of Italy.
