= Fort de Brégançon =

Island fortress in the French Riviera, presidential retreat

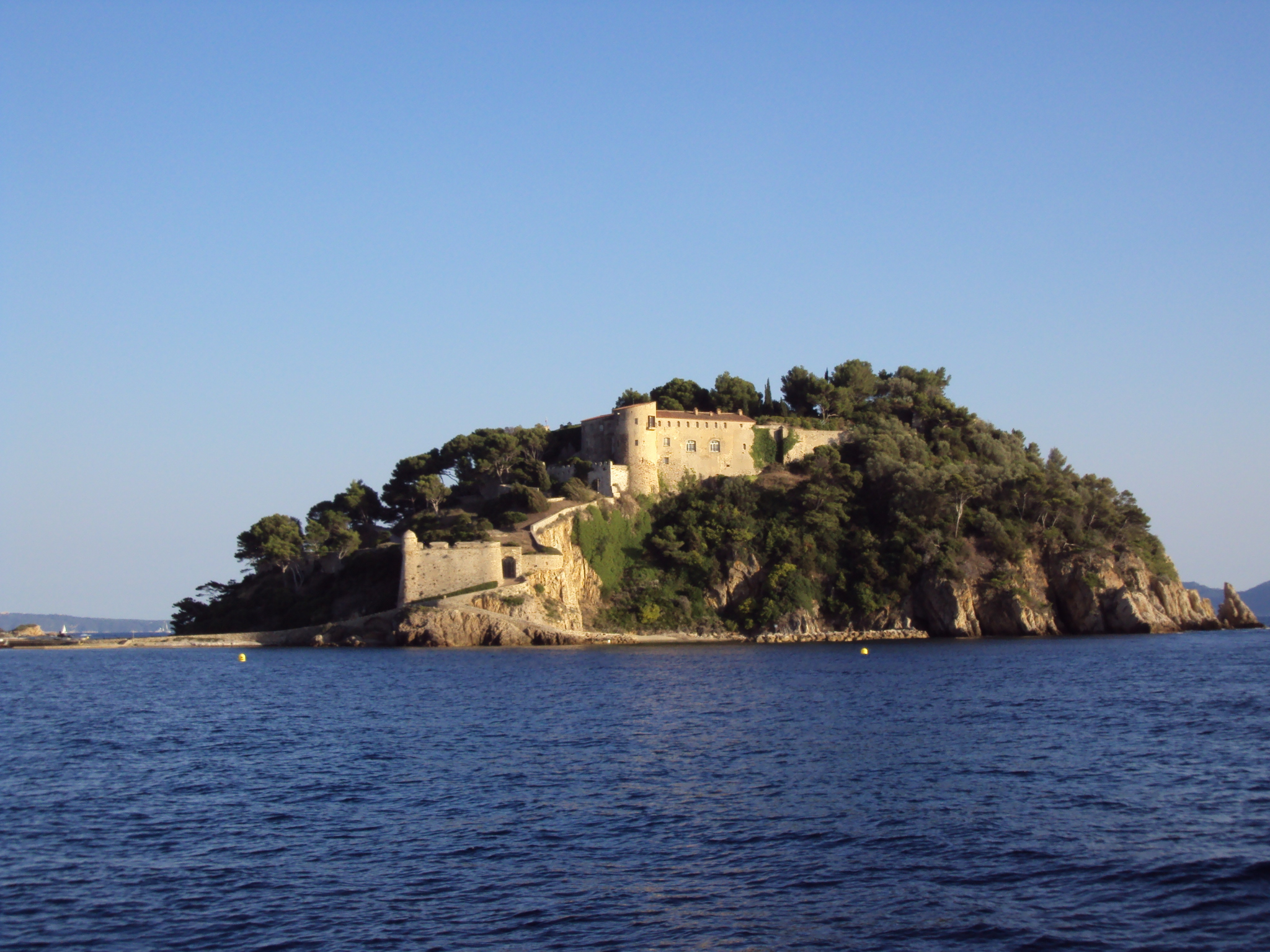
- The Fort de Brégançon seen from the sea
- Interactive map of the Fort de Brégançon area

General information
- Type: Fortress
- Location: Bormes-les-Mimosas, France
- Coordinates: 43.093°N 6.322°E

The Fort de Brégançon (French pronunciation: [fɔʁ d(ə) bʁeɡɑ̃sɔ̃]; English: Fort of Bregançon) is a medieval fortress that is located 35 metres (115 ft) above sea level on an island off the French Riviera. The island is connected by a short causeway to the mainland in the commune of Bormes-les-Mimosas in the Var department in the Provence-Alpes-Côte d'Azur region.

It has been the official retreat of the President of the French Republic since 1968.

== History ==
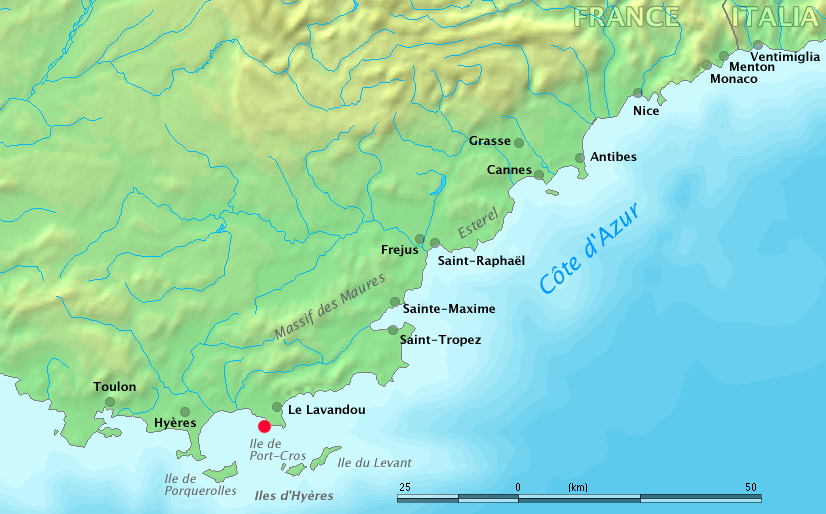
Location of the Fort de Brégançon

The island has long been occupied, due in part to its easily defended nature, and that it allows easy view of the sea access to Hyères and Toulon. The island was the site of a Ligurian oppidum in the 6th century BCE.

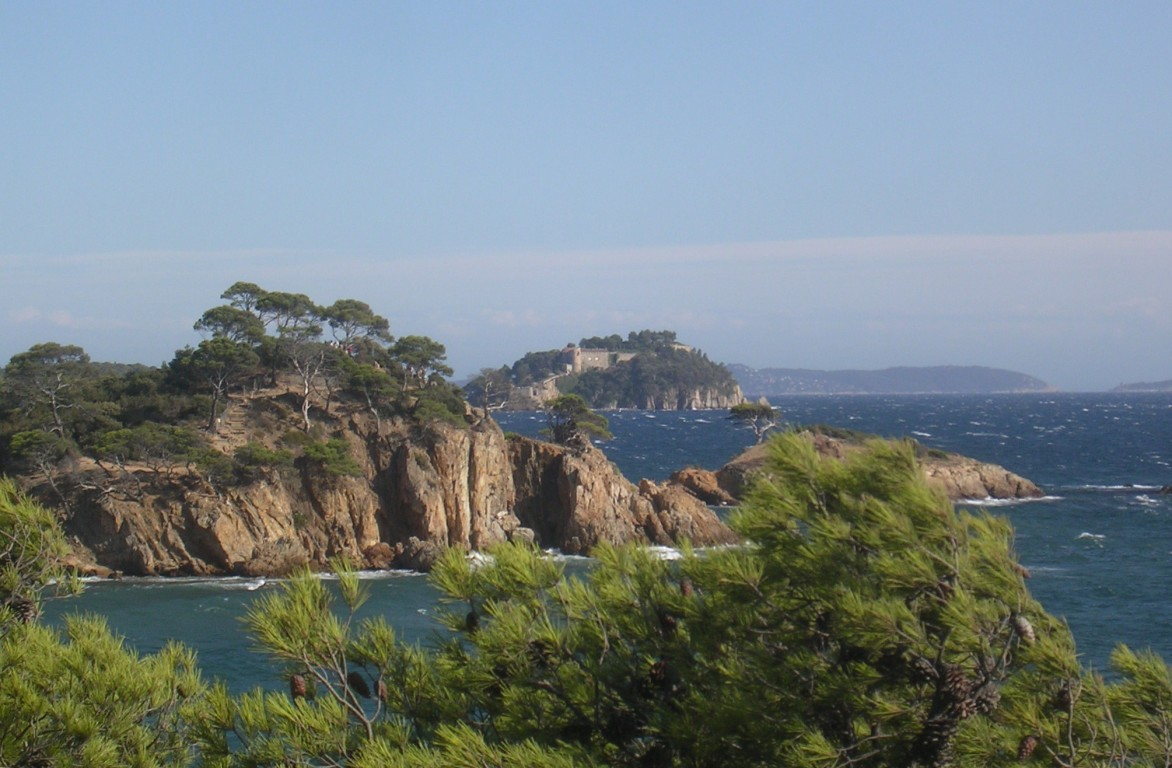
The fort seen from the coast

In the eleventh century, the territory belonged to the Viscount of Marseille, lieutenants of the Count of Provence, who sold it to the Community of Marseille. In 1257, following the marriage of heiress Beatrice of Provence, with Charles I of Anjou who was the brother of King Louis IX, the island became part of the Kingdom of France. Charles subsequently became King of Sicily, and hence began a programme of sea defence improvement, including the fort at Brégançon. In 1348, after staying at Brégançon, Queen Jeanne of Naples and Sicily donated Brégançon to Jacques de Galbert, a ship owner based in Marseille whom she had appointed a Vice Admiral of Provence, by an Act dated 31 July 1348. In 1366, she revoked the Act, returning Brégançon to the crown of the Sicily.

In 1480, Charles of Maine, last ruler of Provence, bequeathed his county to King Louis XI of France. After the King confided Brégançon to Provençal captains, the current fort was built on the island in 1483 by Jean de Baudricourt as part of the French monarchy's coastal defence efforts. In 1574, King Henry III of France donated Brégançon by letters patent to Antoine Escalin des Aymars, baron of the guard, captain general of the galleys. The fort and estate were separated in 1786. Napoléon Bonaparte became interested in Brégançon after the recapture of Toulon, and after initial repairs endowed it with improved artillery, and then strengthened the garrison with a company of Imperial veterans.

After the Franco-Prussian War of 1870, the War Ministry commissioned work to ensure that the fort could receive modern artillery and a powder magazine, without affecting the external appearance of the fortress. The allowed a small garrison to occupy the fort during World War I, but this was decommissioned in 1919. From the 1920s, excluding the period of World War II, the French Republic rented the fort to various private individuals, the last being a former Minister of Marine of the Third Republic, Robert Bellanger, who with approval restored the fort to become a comfortable private residence whilst preserving its original appearance.

== Presidential residence ==
After the expiry of the lease to Bellanger in 1963, the state took possession of the fort. It became a presidential residence in 1968 during the presidency of Charles de Gaulle (1890–1970). In 1985, François Mitterrand invited Chancellor Helmut Kohl to Brégançon.

It was used only once by President Nicolas Sarkozy and his then wife Cécilia Ciganer-Albéniz. Since 2007, La Lanterne in Yvelines has also been used as a retreat. It was also only used once by President François Hollande and his partner Valérie Trierweiler, in the summer of 2012, when it was discovered it was not sufficiently private, too easy a target for paparazzi.

In October 2013, it was announced it would become a national monument open to the public, in an effort to reduce state expenditure. The maintenance and staffing of the property cost 200,000 euro a year. Instead, La Lanterne became the official retreat of the President of France.

The fort, however, remained in use as an official retreat of the President of the French Republic. Emmanuel Macron has received only a few foreign dignitaries, including the following:

- 3 August 2018 – Prime Minister Theresa May of the United Kingdom
- 19 August 2019 – President Vladimir Putin of Russia
- 20 August 2020 – Chancellor Angela Merkel of Germany
- 28 August 2025 – Chancellor Friedrich Merz of Germany

== In popular culture ==
The fort served as El Supremo's fortress in the 1951 film Captain Horatio Hornblower.
