= Serafino Mazzolini =

Italian journalist and lawyer

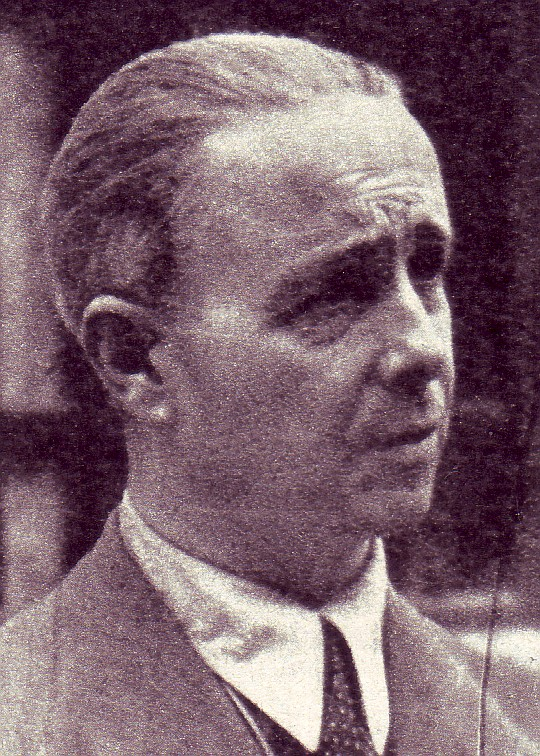

Personal details
- Born: 9 June 1890
- Died: 23 February 1945 (aged 54)

Serafino Mazzolini (9 June 1890 – 23 February 1945) was an Italian lawyer, fascist politician, and journalist.

== Early life ==
Mazzolini was born in Arcevia, in the Marche. He founded a nationalist group in Macerata, and soon became editor of the daily newspaper L'Unione. An active Italia irredenta and advocate of Italy's entry into World War I, he was a volunteer soldier in 1915 and was awarded a War Merit Cross.

In 1918, Mazzolini returned to Ancona and was deputy editor of L'Ordine newspaper, interrupting his assignment in order to join Gabriele D'Annunzio as the latter attempted to seize Fiume for an "unredeemed" Italy (1919).

A member of the provincial council in Ancona, he took part in the March on Rome of 1922. In 1923, he joined the Partito Nazionale Fascista (PNF) — becoming one of its leaders in 1924-1925. A deputy secretary for the PNF, he contributed to its Propaganda Office and represented it in the Italian Chamber of Deputies from 1924 onward. In 1926, he was awarded a supervisory position as a member of the Grand Council of Fascism.

In quick succession, he renounced all PNF political missions and returned to journalism for a while, before beginning a career in diplomacy. He became Italy's envoy to Brazil, Uruguay, the British Mandate of Palestine, and Egypt.

== World War II ==
After the start of World War II and the invasion of Yugoslavia carried out by the Axis powers on their former ally, the Kingdom of Yugoslavia, Serafino Mazzolini was appointed High Commissioner for Italian-occupied Montenegro in 1941. He was appointed to a high-ranking position in the fascist Ministry of Foreign Affairs in 1943.

After Mussolini's ousting and the Armistice of Cassibile (8 September 1943) between Italy and the Allies, Mazzolini joined the Nazi German-backed and Mussolini-led Italian Social Republic, serving as its deputy secretary for Foreign Affairs.

During this period, he amassed large debts to procure diabetes medications to stay alive. He died at San Felice del Benaco as a result of sepsis produced by an insulin injection.

== Personal life ==
His elder brother, Conte Quinto Mazzolini, served as Italian consul in Jerusalem and undertook negotiations with Abraham Stern, head of the Lehi terrorist group, which sought (but failed) to obtain Italian recognition of Jewish sovereignty in Palestine in exchange for placing Zionism under the aegis of Italian fascism.
