= 48th Artillery Regiment "Taro" =

Inactive Italian Army artillery unit

- 48° Reggimento Artiglieria "Taro"
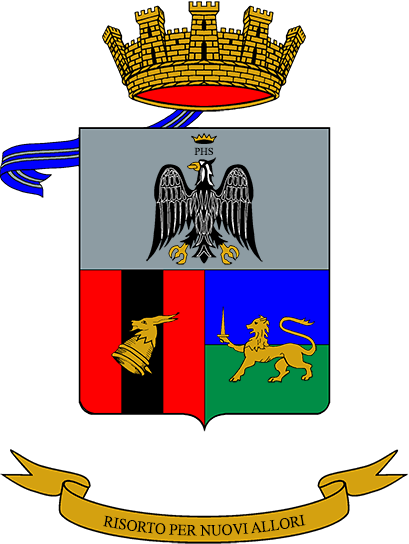
- Regimental coat of arms
- Active: 8 May 1915 — Feb. 1919; 16 Sept. 1935 — 28 Sept. 1936; 12 Sept. 1939 — 8 Sept. 1943; 1 Oct. 1975 — 11 Sept. 1995
- Country: Italy
- Branch: Italian Army
- Part of: Motorized Brigade "Acqui"
- Garrison/HQ: L'Aquila
- Motto: "Risorto per nuovi allori"
- Anniversaries: 15 June 1918 - Second Battle of the Piave River
- Decorations: 1x War Cross of Military Valor

Insignia
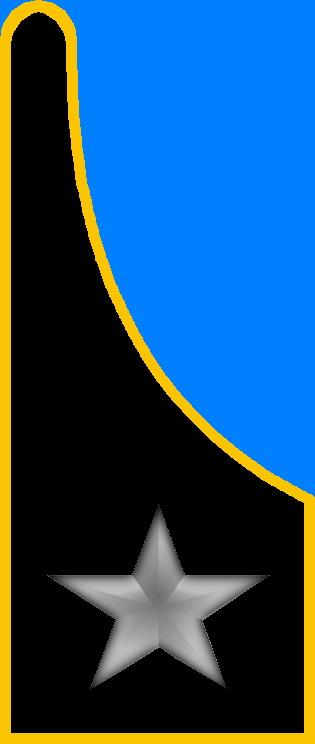
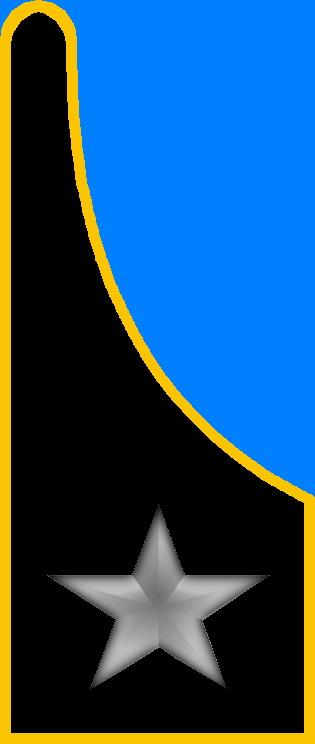
- Regimental gorget patches

The 48th Artillery Regiment "Taro" (Italian: 48° Reggimento Artiglieria "Taro") is an inactive field artillery regiment of the Italian Army, which was based in L'Aquila in Abruzzo. Originally an artillery regiment of the Royal Italian Army, the regiment was formed days before Italy's entry into World War I and disbanded after the war. The regiment was reformed in 1935 during the Second Italo-Ethiopian War, but disbanded after the war in 1936. The regiment was reformed in 1939 and assigned in World War II to the 48th Infantry Division "Taro", with which the regiment fought in the Greco-Italian War. The division and its regiments were disbanded in the South of France by German forces after the announcement of the Armistice of Cassibile on 8 September 1943.

The unit was reformed in 1975 as 48th Field Artillery Group "Taro" and assigned to the Motorized Brigade "Acqui". In 1992 the group was reorganized as regiment. In 1995 the regiment was disbanded and its personnel, materiel, and base were assigned to the 33rd Self-propelled Field Artillery Regiment "Acqui". The regimental anniversary falls, as for all Italian Army artillery regiments, on June 15, the beginning of the Second Battle of the Piave River in 1918.

== History ==
=== World War I ===
On 8 May 1915, just days before Italy's entry into World War I, the 48th Field Artillery Regiment was formed in Alessandria by the depot of the 11th Field Artillery Regiment. The new regiment was assigned, together with the Brigade "Spezia" and Brigade "Firenze", to the 32nd Division and consisted of a command and two groups with a combined six batteries equipped with 75/27 mod. 06 field guns.

During the war the regiment served on the Italian front. In 1915 the regiment was deployed at Plave, where it participated in June in the First Battle of the Isonzo, in October in the Third Battle of the Isonzo, and in November in the Fourth Battle of the Isonzo. In 1916 the regiment was located on the Santa Caterina and Tivoli hills near Gorizia. During the Eleventh Battle of the Isonzo the regiment fought on the Banjšice Plateau. In June 1918 the regiment was arrayed on the Montello for the Second Battle of the Piave River. During the decisive Battle of Vittorio Veneto the regiment was once again deployed on the Montello.

After the war the regiment was disbanded in February 1919.

=== Interwar years ===
On 15 September 1935 the 29th Artillery Regiment "Cosseria" of the 5th Infantry Division "Cosseria" departed Albenga for Libya for the Second Italo-Ethiopian War. The next day the depot of the 29th Artillery Regiment reformed the 48th Artillery Regiment "Cosseria II" as replacement. The regiment was assigned to the 105th Infantry Division "Cosseria II" and consisted of a command, a command unit, a group with 100/17 mod. 14 howitzers, a group with mule-carried 75/13 mod. 15 mountain guns, and two groups with 75/27 mod. 06 field guns. The first two groups had been left behind by the 29th Artillery Regiment, while the latter two had been transferred from the 11th Artillery Regiment "Monferrato" respectively the 25th Artillery Regiment "Assietta". On 28 September 1936 the 29th Artillery Regiment "Cosseria" returned to Albenga and the 48th Artillery Regiment "Cosseria II" was disbanded, with the group of the 11th Artillery Regiment "Monferrato" returning to that unit, while the other three groups entered the 29th Artillery Regiment "Cosseria".

=== World War II ===
On 12 September 1939 the 48th Artillery Regiment "Taro" was reformed in Nola and assigned to the 48th Infantry Division "Taro", which also included the 207th Infantry Regiment "Taro" and 208th Infantry Regiment "Taro". The regiment consisted of a command, a command unit, a group with 100/17 mod. 14 howitzers, a group with 75/27 mod. 11 field guns, a group with 75/13 mod. 15 mountain guns, an anti-aircraft battery with 20/65 mod. 35 anti-aircraft guns, and a depot.

In November 1940 the regiment replaced its 100/17 mod. 14 howitzers and 75/27 mod. 11 field guns with 75/13 mod. 15 mountain guns, which were transferred from the 28th Artillery Regiment "Livorno". The same month the division was shipped to Albania to reinforce the crumbling Italian front in the Greco-Italian War. In December 1940 the division entered the front and until March 1941 it defended its positions against repeated Greek attacks. The division remained in Albania until the end of the Battle of Greece. From June 1941 to August 1942 the division was in Montenegro on occupation duties. Meanwhile the regiment's depot in Nola used the regiment's discarded 100/17 mod. 14 howitzers to form a new group, which was transferred in May 1942 to the 25th Artillery Regiment "Assietta" of the 26th Infantry Division "Assietta". In November 1942 the division participated in the occupation of Vichy France, where it remained on occupation duties. After the announcement of the Armistice of Cassibile between Italy and the Allies the division was disbanded by German forces.

For its conduct in Albania the 48th Artillery Regiment "Taro" was awarded a War Cross of Military Valor, which was affixed on the regiment's flag and is depicted on the regiment's coat of arms.

=== Cold War ===
During the 1975 army reform the army disbanded the regimental level and newly independent battalions and groups were granted for the first time their own flags. On 30 September 1975 the 13th Field Artillery Regiment and its II and III groups were disbanded, while the regiment's I and IV groups became autonomous units. The next day the IV Group was renamed 48th Field Artillery Group "Taro" and assigned to the Motorized Brigade "Acqui". The group was based in L'Aquila and consisted of a command, a command and services battery, and three batteries with towed M114 155 mm howitzers.

On 12 November 1976 the President of the Italian Republic Giovanni Leone assigned with decree 846 the flag and traditions of the 48th Artillery Regiment "Taro" to the group. At the time the group fielded 485 men (37 officers, 58 non-commissioned officers, and 390 soldiers).

=== Recent times ===
In 1991, after the end of the Cold War, the Italian Army disbanded many of its artillery units in the country's Northeast and transferred their equipment to the remaining artillery units. In 1992 the 48th Field Artillery Group "Taro" received M109G 155 mm self-propelled howitzers and on 1 December of that year the group lost its autonomy and entered the next day the 48th Self-propelled Field Artillery Regiment "Taro". On 10 September 1995 the batteries of the 33rd Heavy Field Artillery Regiment "Acqui" in Casarsa della Delizia were disbanded and the flag of that regiment was transferred to L'Aquila, where the next day it supplanted the flag of the 48th Self-propelled Field Artillery Regiment "Taro". The same day the flag of the Taro left L'Aquila and on 13 September was returned to the Shrine of the Flags in the Vittoriano in Rome.
