= Musée d'Ennery =

Museum in Paris, France

Coordinates: 48°52′18″N 2°16′53″E

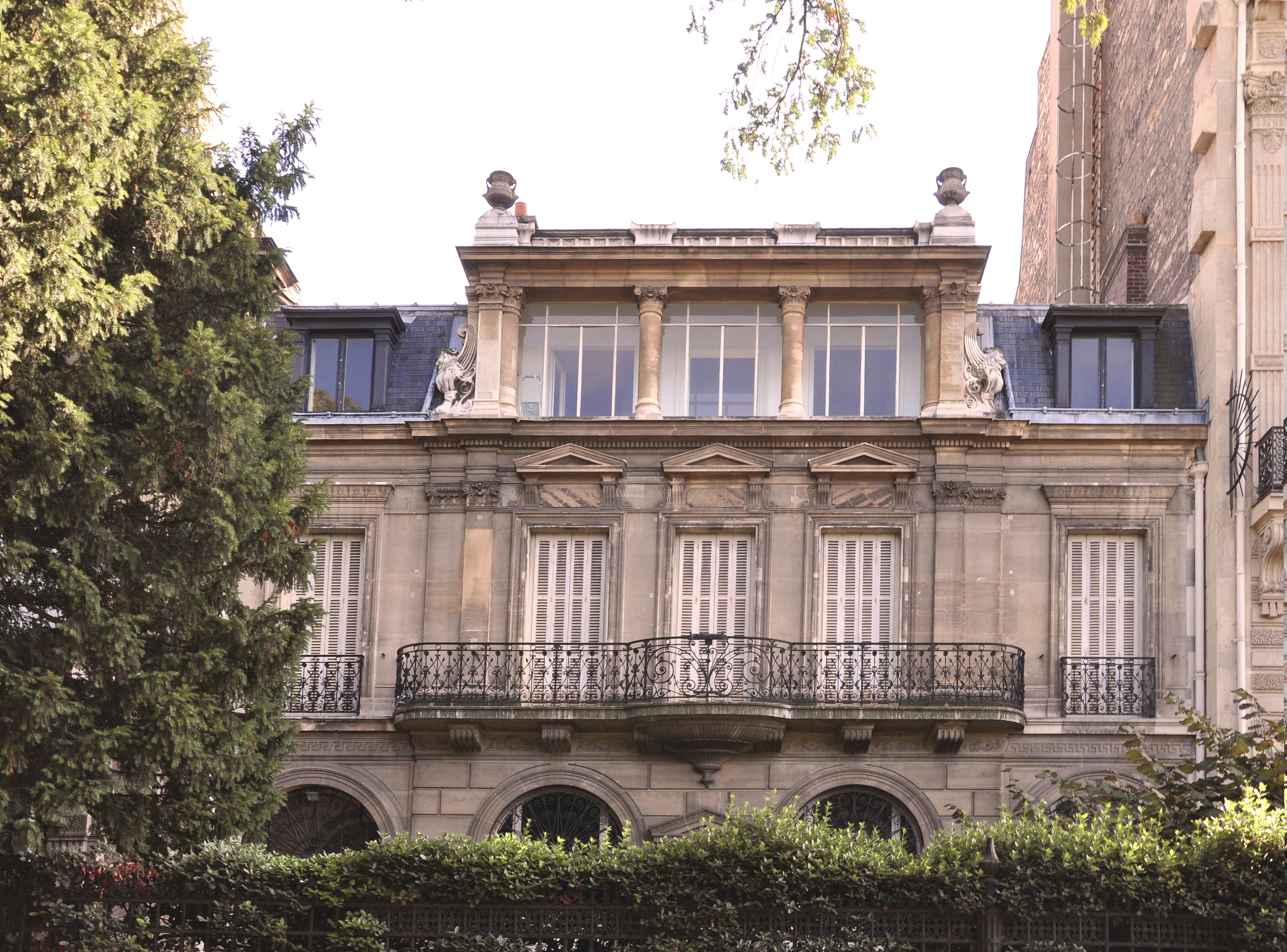
Musée d'Ennery

The Musée d'Ennery is a national museum of Asian art located in the 16th arrondissement of Paris at 59, avenue Foch, Paris, France.

The museum has grown from a private collection first begun in the second half of the 19th century by Clémence d'Ennery, wife of playwright Adolphe Philippe d'Ennery (1811–1899). In 1875 she built today's mansion in the Second Empire style, and in 1892 she began to transition it to a public museum with the help of Georges Clemenceau and Émile Deshayes, curator of the Guimet Museum. It was inaugurated as a public museum in 1908.

The museum contains nearly 7000 objects purchased from the antique shops Bing, Burty, and Sichel, as well as Au Bon Marché and small boutiques, illustrating daily life in China and Japan from the 12th to 19th centuries. They are exhibited in large wooden cabinets inlaid with mother-of-pearl, and include Kyoto ceramics, Nanban Art resulting from contacts between the Japanese and the Portuguese 1543–1640, over 300 netsuke from the Tokugawa period (1603–1837), porcelain of various East India companies, dolls and figurines, carvings of semi-precious stones, ivories and bronzes, furniture, lacquerwork, with many fine carvings of animal and human forms.

The museum was closed for refurbishment from 1996 to April 2012.

It is open on Saturdays for lecture tours in French by appointment. Booking is required. The nearest métro station is Victor Hugo.

== See also ==
- List of museums in Paris
