= Paolo Antonio Pirazzoli =

Italian geomorphologist

Paolo Antonio Pirazzoli (1939–2017) was an Italian and French geomorphologist.

== Life ==
Pirazzoli was born in Venice, and acquired French citizenship in 1978. He studied Civil Engineering at Palermo, and went to work in France. Made redundant by the engineering company he was working for, he turned to a career in geography, earning a PhD in Geography (1976), titled “Les variations du niveau marin depuis 2000 ans” [Variations in sea-levels over 2000 years]. His main research centred on Quaternary sea-level changes, and shorelines (Holocene, Pleistocene) all over the world. As head of research at CNRS, Paris, he led several international projects, and was scientific editor for a number of journals, including Global and Planetary Change (Elsevier). The International Association of Geomorphology awarded him Honorary Fellowship in 2013, for his services to the discipline. He was married to archaeologist and art historian Michèle Pirazzoli-t’Serstevens.

== Selected publications ==
- 1976 - "Sea level variations in the northwest Mediterranean during Roman times", Science, 194(4264), 519-521.
- 1982 - (Pirazzoli, P. A., Thommeret, J., Thommeret, Y., Laborel, J., & Montaggioni, L. F.) "Crustal block movements from Holocene shorelines: Crete and Antikythira (Greece)", Tectonophys cs, 86(1-3), 27-43.
- 1986 - (Pirazzoli, P. A., & Montaggioni, L. F.) "Late Holocene sea-level changes in the northwest Tuamotu Islands, French Polynesia", Quaternary Research, 25(3), 350-368.
- 1987 - "Recent sea-level changes and related engineering problems in the lagoon of Venice (Italy)", Progress in Oceanography, 18(1-4), 323-346.
- 1989 - "Present and near-future global sea-level changes", Palaeogeography, Palaeoclimatology, Palaeoecology, 75(4), 241-258.
- 1991 - World Atlas of Holocene Sea-Level Changes. Elsevier Oceanography Series, Vol. 58, 300 p., Amsterdam.
- 1996 - (Pirazzoli, P. A., Laborel, J., & Stiros, S. C.) "Earthquake clustering in the Eastern Mediterranean during historical times", Journal of Geophysical Research: Solid Earth, 101(B3), 6083-6097.
- 1997 - "Sea-level changes: the last 20 000 years", Oceanographic Literature Review, 8(44), 785.
- 2003 - (Pirazzoli, P. A., & Tomasin, A.) "Recent near‐surface wind changes in the central Mediterranean and Adriatic areas", International Journal of Climatology, 23(8), 963-973.
- 2005 - "A review of possible eustatic, isostatic and tectonic contributions in eight late-Holocene relative sea-level histories from the Mediterranean area", Quaternary Science Reviews, 24(18), 1989-2001.
- 2013 - (Pirazzoli, P. A., & Evelpidou, N.) "Tidal notches: a sea-level indicator of uncertain archival trustworthiness", Palaeogeography, Palaeoclimatology, Palaeoecology, 369, 377-384.
- 2017 - (Evelpidou, N., & Pirazzoli, P. A.) "Did the Early Byzantine tectonic paroxysm (EBTP) also affect the Adriatic area?", Geomorphology.
