= Bormes-les-Mimosas =

- Commune
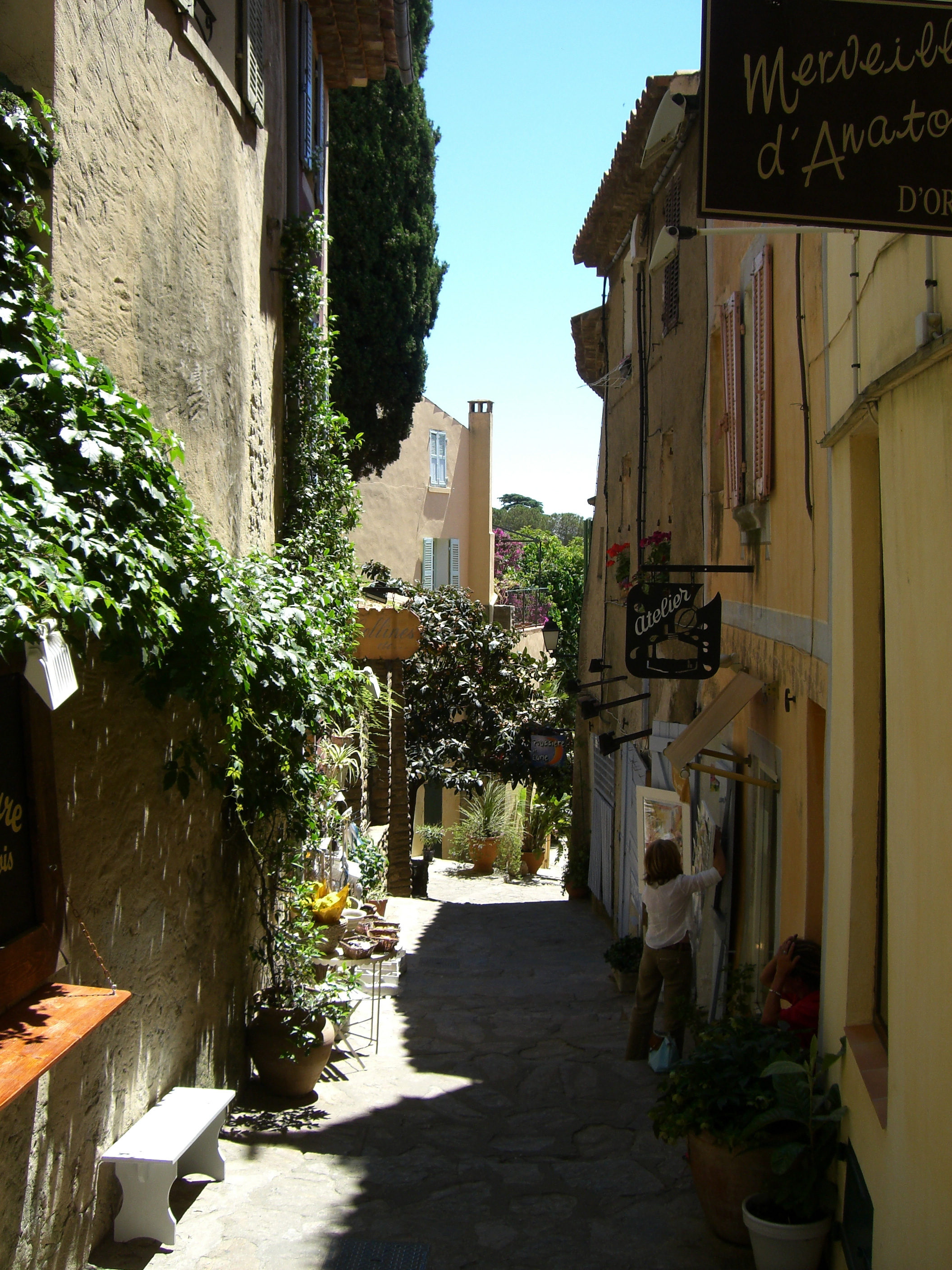
- Street in Bormes-les-Mimosas

- Coat of arms
- Location of Bormes-les-Mimosas
- Location within France Location within Provence-Alpes-Côte d'Azur
- Coordinates: 43°09′09″N 6°20′38″E
- Country: France
- Region: Provence-Alpes-Côte d'Azur
- Department: Var
- Arrondissement: Toulon
- Canton: La Crau
- Intercommunality: Communauté de communes Méditerranée Porte des Maures

Government
  - Mayor (2020–2026): François Arizzi (DVD)
- Area^{1}: 97.32 km^{2} (37.58 sq mi)
- Population (2023): 8,545
  - Density: 87.80/km^{2} (227.4/sq mi)
- Time zone: UTC+01:00 (CET)
  - Summer (DST): UTC+02:00 (CEST)
- INSEE/Postal code: 83019 /83230
- ^{1} French Land Register data, which excludes lakes, ponds, glaciers > 1 km^{2} (0.386 sq mi or 247 acres) and river estuaries.

Bormes-les-Mimosas (French pronunciation: [bɔʁm le mimoza]; Occitan: Bòrmas dei Mimòsas) is a commune in the Var department, Provence-Alpes-Côte d'Azur Region, southeastern France.

It has a Mediterranean climate.

Bormes-les-Mimosas is a city in bloom and won the 2003 Gold Medal awarded by the Entente Florale. The Fort de Brégançon, located in the commune, is the official retreat of the President of the French Republic.

The historic village is situated on the hills. Medieval houses are overgrown with bougainvillea flowers. Significant buildings include the church and the town hall.

Other parts of town include the seaside district of La Faviere with its marina.

== Geography ==
=== Climate ===
Bormes-les-Mimosas has a hot-summer Mediterranean climate (Köppen climate classification Csa). The average annual temperature in Bormes-les-Mimosas is 14.3 °C (57.7 °F). The average annual rainfall is 917.9 mm (36.14 in) with October the wettest month. Average temperatures are highest in August at around 22.7 °C (72.9 °F), and lowest in January at around 7.2 °C (45.0 °F). The highest temperature ever recorded in Bormes-les-Mimosas was 41.9 °C (107.4 °F) on 7 July 1982; the coldest temperature ever recorded was −12.6 °C (9.3 °F) on 8 January 1985.

Climate data for Bormes-les-Mimosas (1981−2010 normals, extremes 1971−present)
Month	Jan	Feb	Mar	Apr	May	Jun	Jul	Aug	Sep	Oct	Nov	Dec	Year
Record high °C (°F)	23.6 (74.5)	25.8 (78.4)	28.9 (84.0)	28.0 (82.4)	35.3 (95.5)	38.9 (102.0)	41.9 (107.4)	39.9 (103.8)	36.4 (97.5)	30.9 (87.6)	26.3 (79.3)	22.5 (72.5)	41.9 (107.4)
Mean daily maximum °C (°F)	12.8 (55.0)	13.4 (56.1)	16.1 (61.0)	18.2 (64.8)	22.5 (72.5)	26.6 (79.9)	30.1 (86.2)	30.1 (86.2)	25.9 (78.6)	21.1 (70.0)	16.2 (61.2)	13.4 (56.1)	20.6 (69.1)
Daily mean °C (°F)	7.2 (45.0)	7.5 (45.5)	9.9 (49.8)	12.1 (53.8)	15.9 (60.6)	19.7 (67.5)	22.6 (72.7)	22.7 (72.9)	19.1 (66.4)	15.5 (59.9)	10.8 (51.4)	8.1 (46.6)	14.3 (57.7)
Mean daily minimum °C (°F)	1.5 (34.7)	1.5 (34.7)	3.7 (38.7)	6.0 (42.8)	9.3 (48.7)	12.7 (54.9)	15.1 (59.2)	15.3 (59.5)	12.4 (54.3)	9.9 (49.8)	5.4 (41.7)	2.7 (36.9)	8.0 (46.4)
Record low °C (°F)	−12.6 (9.3)	−10.6 (12.9)	−11.8 (10.8)	−4.0 (24.8)	−1.0 (30.2)	2.2 (36.0)	6.2 (43.2)	4.9 (40.8)	1.0 (33.8)	−4.1 (24.6)	−7.6 (18.3)	−9.5 (14.9)	−12.6 (9.3)
Average precipitation mm (inches)	113.4 (4.46)	68.3 (2.69)	59.0 (2.32)	91.1 (3.59)	57.4 (2.26)	42.6 (1.68)	13.7 (0.54)	27.5 (1.08)	76.9 (3.03)	133.5 (5.26)	116.8 (4.60)	117.7 (4.63)	917.9 (36.14)
Average precipitation days (≥ 1.0 mm)	6.4	5.5	5.3	7.3	5.3	3.7	1.5	2.4	4.9	7.5	7.6	7.7	65.2
Source: Météo-France

== Demography ==
Historical population
Year	Pop.	±% p.a.
1968	2,965	—
1975	3,093	+0.61%
1982	3,839	+3.13%
1990	5,083	+3.57%
1999	6,324	+2.46%
2007	7,153	+1.55%
2012	7,698	+1.48%
2017	8,102	+1.03%
2023	8,545	+0.89%
Source: INSEE

== Personalities ==
Notable people related to Bormes-les-Mimosas include:

- Alfred Courmes, born in Bormes-les-Mimosas on 21 May 1898, painter
- Hermann Sabran, lawyer and philanthropist from Lyon, General Councillor of Var, owner of the Fort de Brégançon, married in Bormes-les-Mimosas on 22 June 1869
- Grand Duke Henri of Luxembourg (and the Grand Ducal Family), who owns a holiday villa, La Tour sarrasine, in nearby Cabasson village, purchased by his grandmother, the Grand Duchess Charlotte, in 1949.
- Hippolyte de Bouchard was born in Bormes-les-Mimosas on 15 January 1780. He was a sailor and corsair who fought for the independence of Argentina, Chile and Peru.

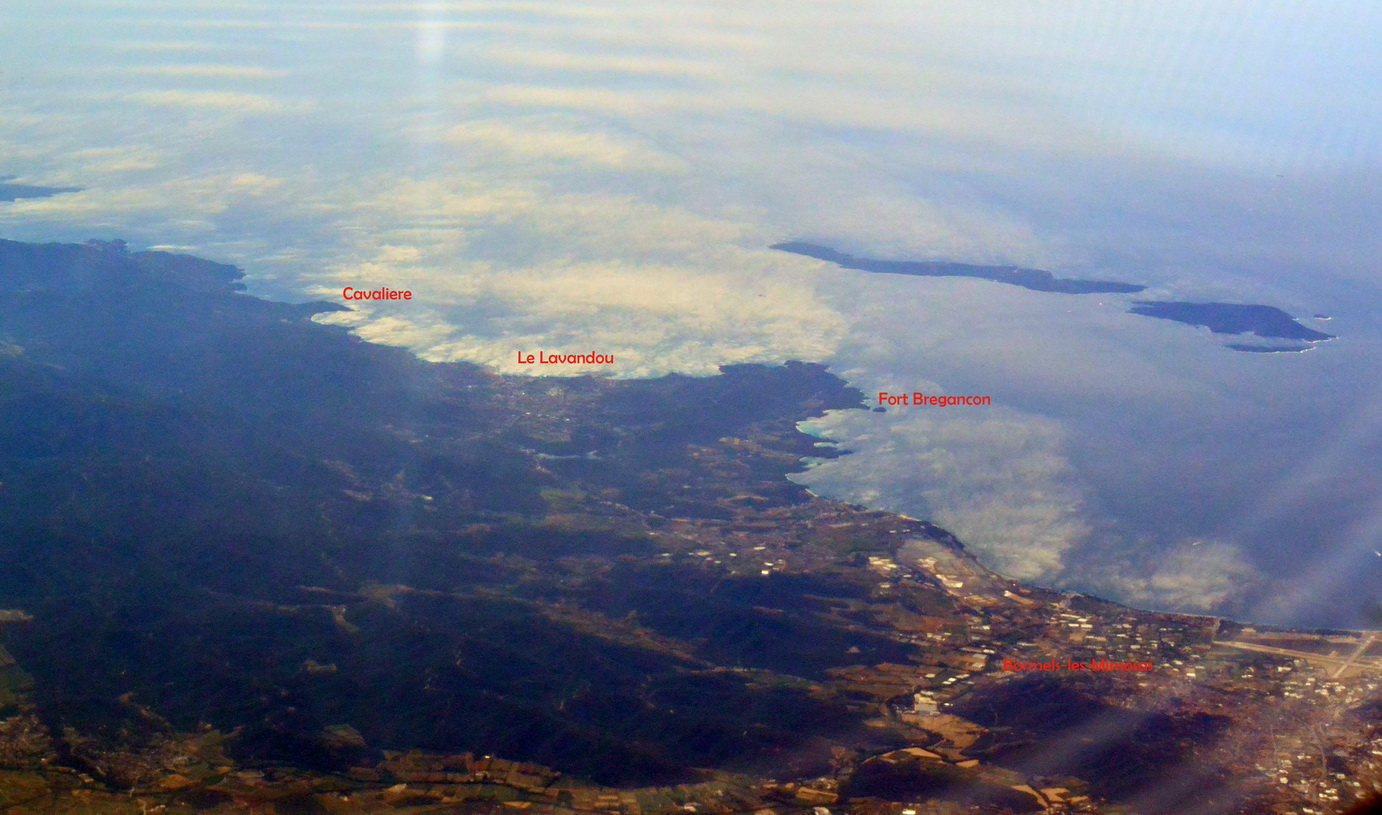
Aerial view of le Fort de Brégançon

== Points of interest ==
- Place St-Francois
- La chapelle Notre-Dame-de-Constance
- Église St-Trophyme
- La chapelle Notre-Dame-de-Constance
- Château des Seigneurs de Foz
- Musee "Arts et Histoire"
- Arboretum de Gratteloup
- Arboretum du Ruscas

== Gallery ==
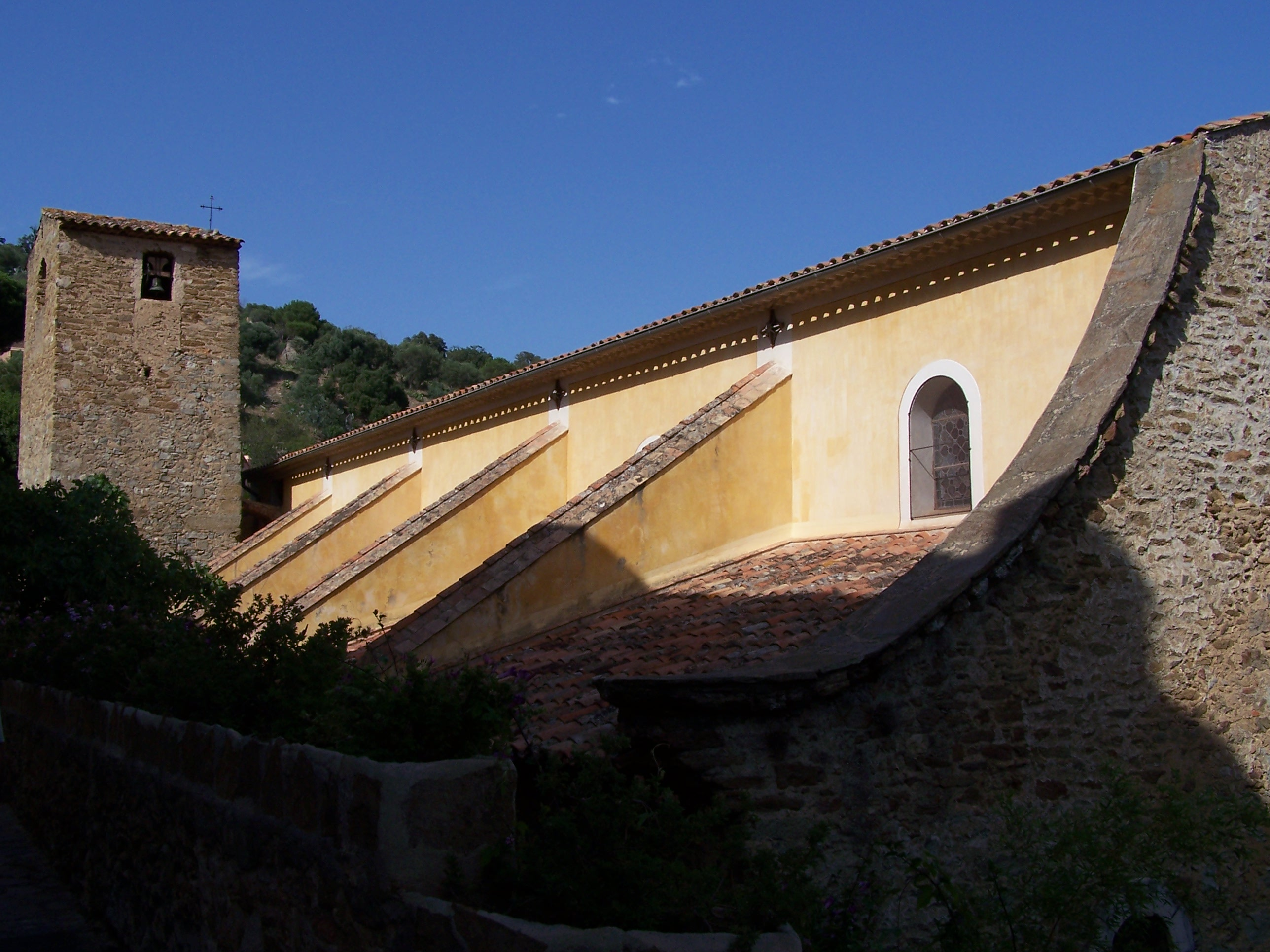
Église St-Trophyme

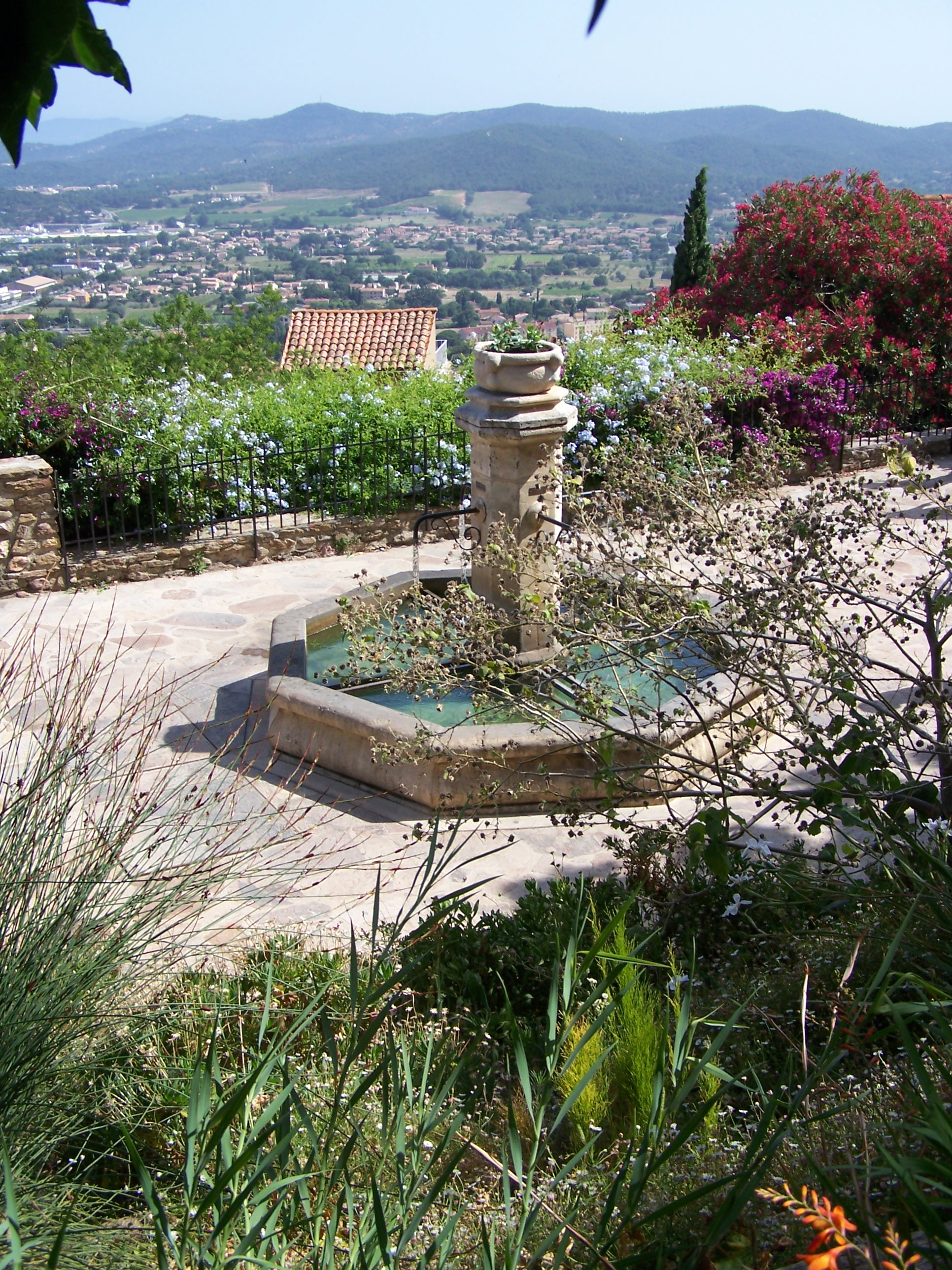
Place l'Isclou d'Amour

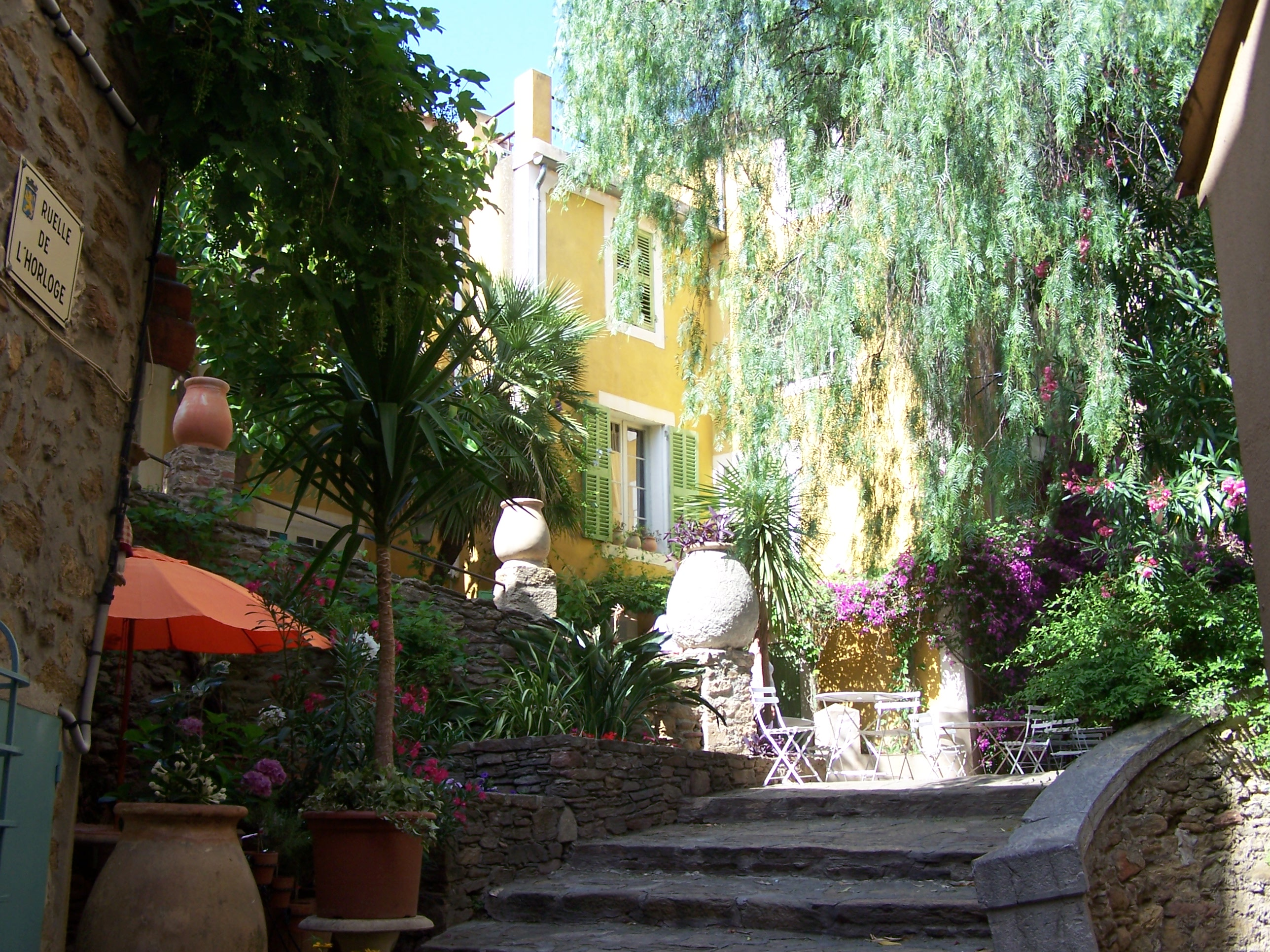
Rue de l'Horloge

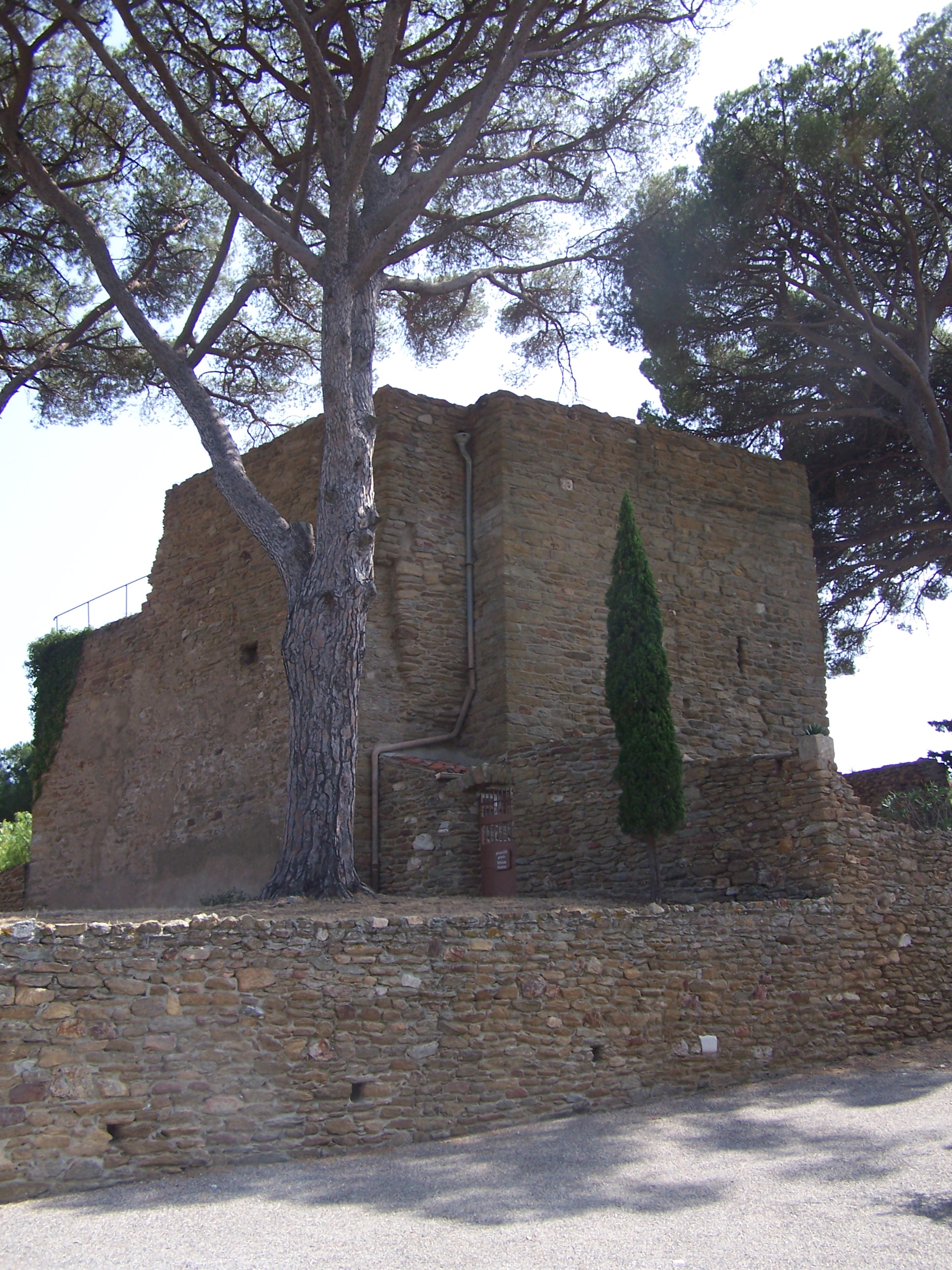
Fort des Seigneurs de Fos

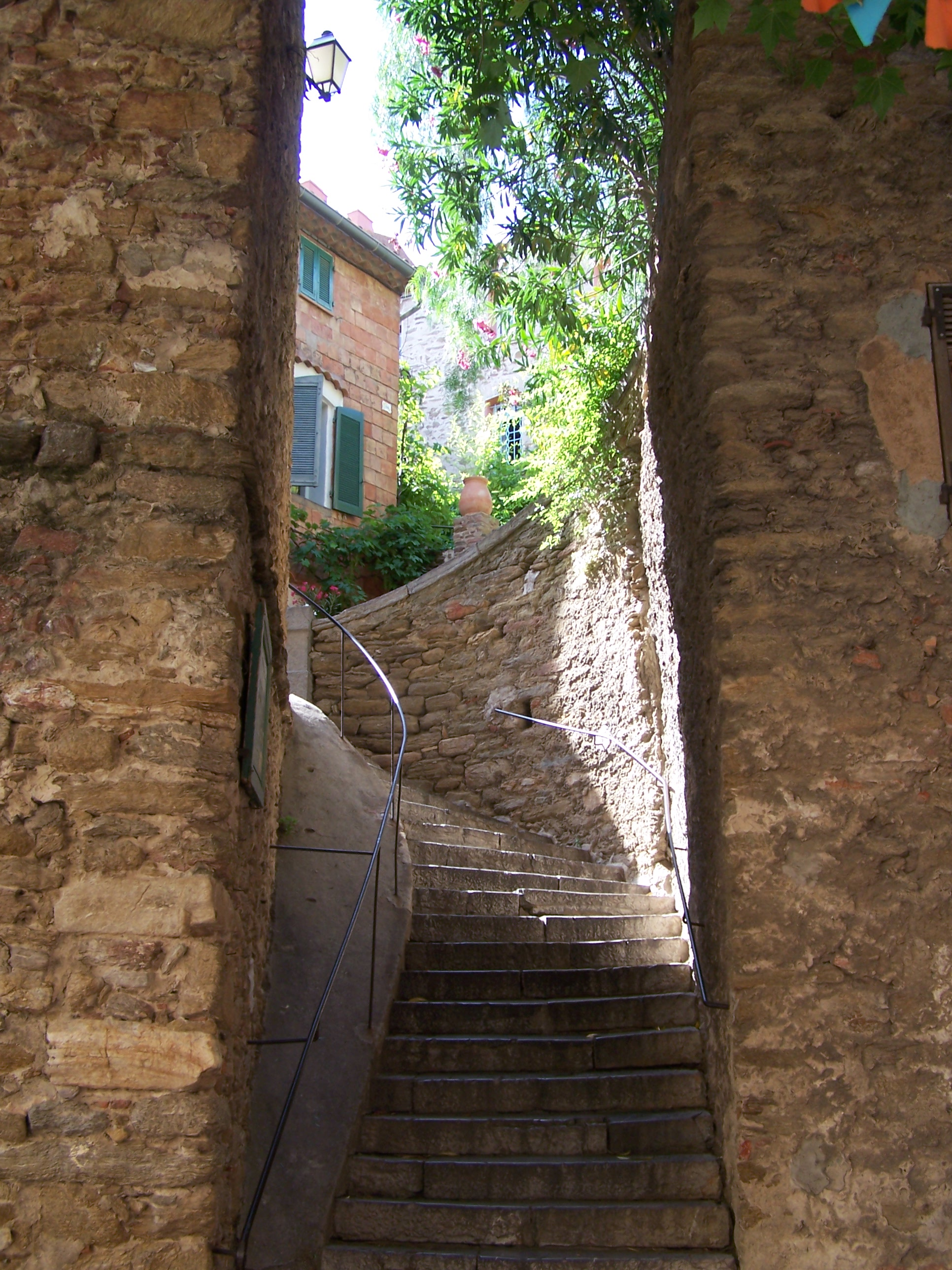
La fameuse pierre des Bormes

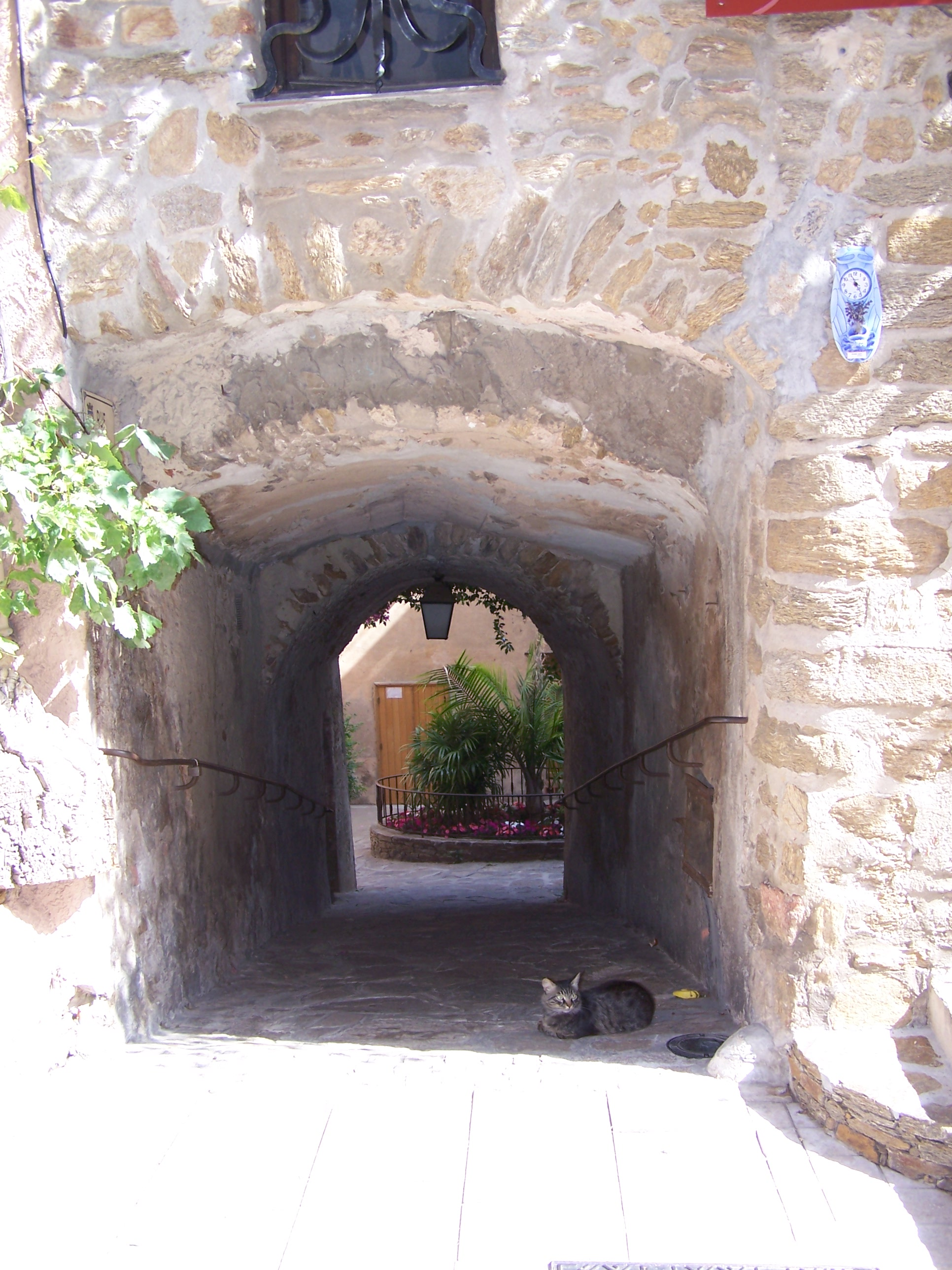
Rue des Contours

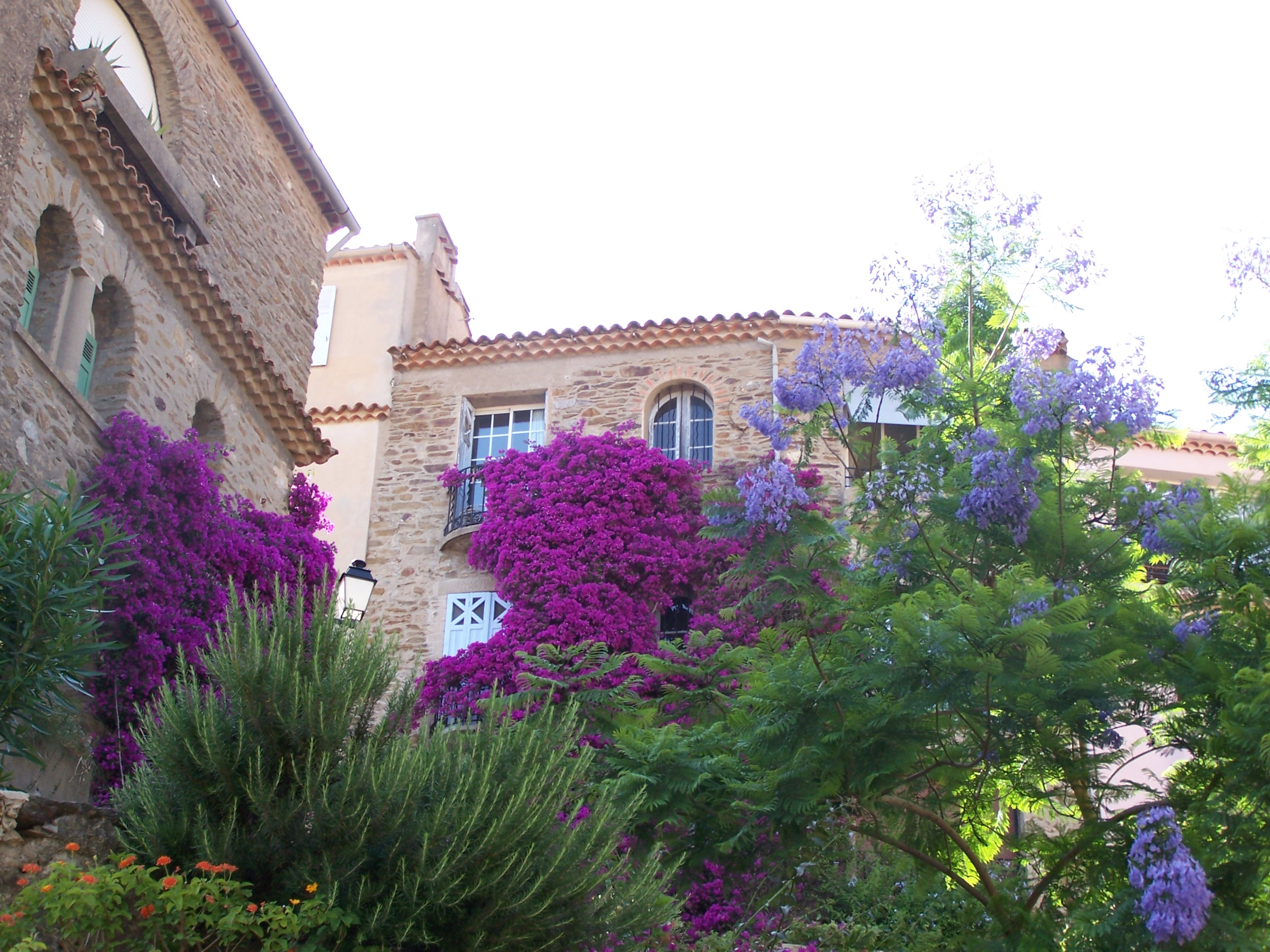
Montée des Écureuils

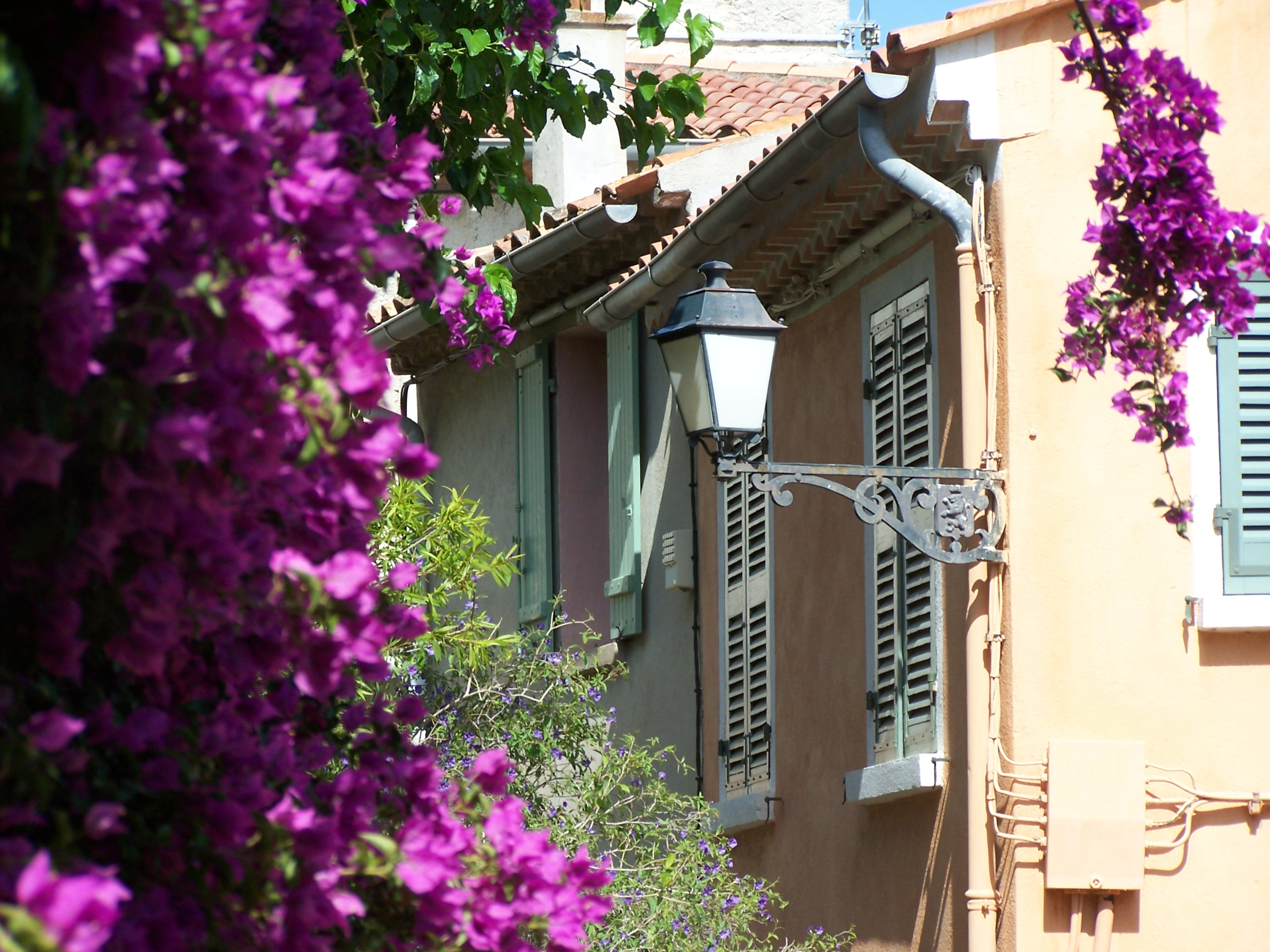
Rue typique de Bormes

== See also ==
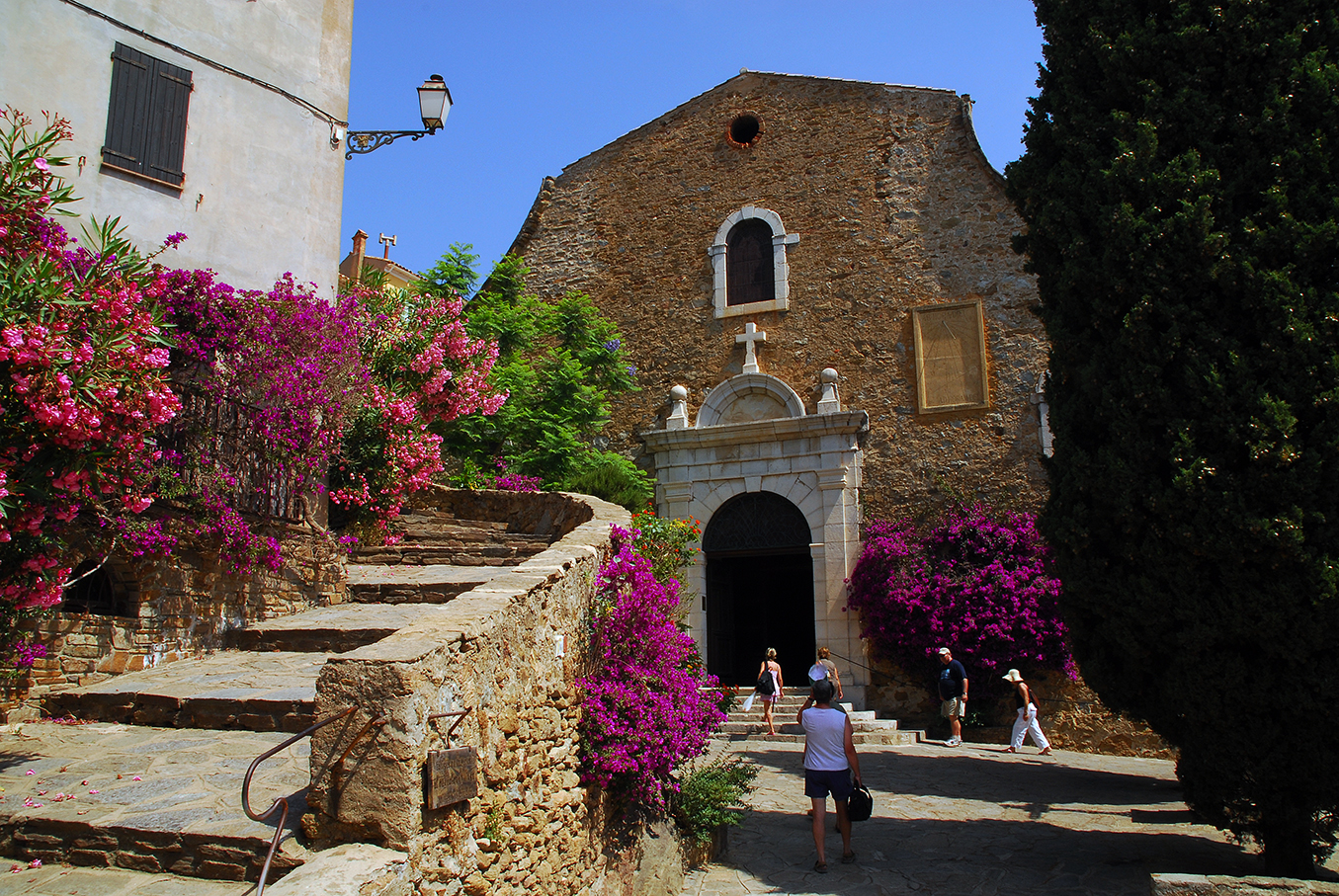
Eglise St-Trophyme

- Communes of the Var department
