= Ettore Perazzoli =

Italian software developer (1974–2003)

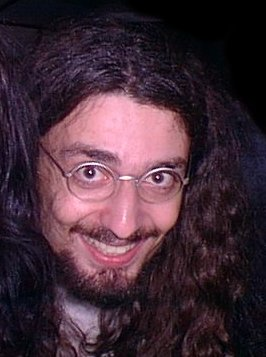
- Ettore Perazzoli in Paris during GUADEC 2000
- Born: June 15, 1974; Milan, Italy
- Died: December 10, 2003 (aged 29)

Ettore Perazzoli (June 15, 1974 – December 10, 2003) was an Italian free software developer.

== Biography ==
Born in Milan, he studied Engineering at the Polytechnic University. He wrote a port of x64, a Commodore 64 emulator for Unix, to MS-DOS, thus turning it into a cross-platform emulator, which was renamed to VICE. He has been a maintainer of VICE for many years, and started the Microsoft Windows port, which is now the most popular version of VICE.

He then started contributing to GNOME, a Linux desktop environment. He helped in writing GtkHTML, Nautilus and Evolution. Close friend of Nat Friedman and Miguel de Icaza, he was invited by them to work for the company they founded, Ximian. He accepted and in 2001 moved to Boston, United States, where Ximian was headquartered.

At Ximian he led the effort to create Evolution and remained the project manager until he died.

He started writing an application for managing digital photo albums, in C#, for personal use. On November 8, 2003, he published it on GNOME Concurrent Versions System (CVS) server, with the name F-Spot.

On December 12, 2003, the GnomeDesktop.org website announced his death from cancer.

== Sources ==
- "Article on GnomeDesktop announcing Ettore's death". Archived from the original on October 12, 2004.
- Article on Barrapunto about Ettore Perazzoli's death (in Spanish)
