= Giovanni Vecchi =

Giovanni Vecchi was a general in the Royal Italian Army who commanded the XIV Corps during the World War II Axis invasion of Yugoslavia in April 1941.

== Biography ==
Vecchi fought in the Italian-Turkish War and in World War I.
Between 1 July 1937 and 9 June 1940, he commanded the 31st Infantry Division "Calabria".
After the entry of Italy in World War II, he became commander of the XIV Corps. With his Corps, he participated in the invasion of Yugoslavia and conquered Montenegro. He was then charged with the occupation on Montenegro until 12 July 1942, when he was transferred to the reserve.
Between 5 December 1941 and 12 February 1943, he was Commander of the XXV Corps, which was stationed in Albania and carried out coastal defence and anti-partisan duties.
He retired and the left the army on 1 March 1943.
