= Maria Auxiliadora (artist) =

Brazilian female painter (1935–1974)

Maria Auxiliadora da Silva
- Born: May 24, 1935; Campo Belo, Minas Gerais, Brazil
- Died: August 20, 1974 (aged 39); São Paulo, São Paulo, Brazil
- Style: Painting

Maria Auxiliadora da Silva (1935–1974) was a self-taught Brazilian painter. Her work was nationally and internationally acclaimed. Characterized by bold colors, thick textures, and mixed media, her paintings center largely on the following themes and genres: Everyday community life and popular manifestations in São Paulo, particularly in the neighborhoods of Brasilândia and Casa Verde; Afro-Brazilian religions, specifically Candomblé, Trinidad Orisha, and Umbanda; self-portraits in which she represents herself as an artist, a bride, and a woman living with cancer; intimacy and affection between women; and urban and rural life.

== Life ==
Maria Auxiliadora was born in Campo Belo, MG. She and her family moved to the city of São Paulo when she was only three years old. She stopped going to school at age 12 to help out her family by working as a housekeeper, only returning to get an education in 1972, at age 37.

She is one of 18 siblings, many of whom are also artists who exhibited their works at art fairs in Embu das Artes and in República Square, in São Paulo. Other artists in the Silva family include the sculptor Vicente Paulo da Silva (1930–1980); the painters Benedito da Silva (1953–1998), Cândido Silva (1933) and Conceição Aparecida Silva (1938); the poet Natália Natalice da Silva (1948); the painter and dollmaker Georgina "Gina" Penha da Silva (1949); and the story teller Efigênia Rosário da Silva (1937). Their mother, Maria Trindade de Almeida Silva (1909–1991), was also an artist, working with sculpture, painting, poetry and embroidery. Their father, José Cândido da Silva, was a railroad handy man that played the accordion.

In 1972, she was diagnosed with cancer, undergoing six surgeries in 10 months, and treatment in spiritist and candomblé centers. She never stopped painting, and portrayed aspects of her illness and medical care through her painting, including representations hospitals, ambulances, angels, and funerals. Auxiliadora died of cancer on August 20, 1974, in São Paulo.

== Artistic career ==
Auxiliadora did not have any formal training in the arts. She learned embroidery from her mother at age 9 and began drawing with charcoal at age 14. By 16, she was using colored pencils and guache, only moving on to oil painting by 26. In 1967 she dedicated herself exclusively to painting.

In 1968, along with some of her siblings, she joined the artist group spearheaded by the artist, musician and poet Solano Trindade in Embu das Artes, São Paulo. In the same year, she participated in multiple shows in the state of São Paulo, winning first prize at the V Art Exhibit of Embu das Artes.

By the early 1970s she became discontent with the art scene in Embu, which was losing its focus on Afro-Brazilian art and culture. She moved back to the city of São Paulo and began exhibiting her works at República Square. There, she met the German marchand Werner Arnhold and the Brazilian art critic Mário Schemberg. The latter introduced her to the consul for the American Embassy, Alan Fisher, who organized a show of her works in the Embassy's Library in 1971.

During the 1970s, she gained popularity in Europe as her work circulated through art fairs and galleries in Basel, Düsseldorf and Paris. In 1971, Pierre Bouvet, the director of the Musée d'Art Naïf et des Arts Singuliers, acquired her paintings for their collections.

== Technique ==
Auxiliadora chronicled day-by-day life in her paintings. She used acrylic paint in bold colors, emphasizing with three-dimensionality parts of the human body and of the landscapes.

In an interview to Lea Coelho Frota in 1972, the artist says that her first paintings in 1968 were flat, with no texture. She started playing with dimensionality, adding thick layers of paint or plaster mixed with her own hair when painting figures. Around the same time, she starts exploring with the use of text, writing dialogues out of the mouths of the figures she painted in the style of comics.

== Critical recognition ==
Auxiliadora gained more notoriety after her death, particularly overseas. A book about her work was published by the Italian publisher Giulio Bolaffi in 1977, with contributions by Max Fourny, the director of the Musée d’art naïf de Vicq en Île-de-France, Emanuel von Lauenstein Massarani, a cultural attache of Brasil in Switzerland, and Pietro Maria Bardi, a director of the Museum of Art of São Paulo (MASP). Tribute solo shows were organized in Italy, France and Germany, as well as in MASP and the National Museum of Fine Arts, in Rio de Janeiro.

Because of her hybridism of painting and reliefs, Leia Coelho Frota considered Auxiliadora's visual expression as bordering on pop art, while Massarani characterized her work as being in the border of art naïf and art brut, far from social and cultural conformity. In recent years, MASP has reconsidered her work beyond these "paternalistic and reductive categories," instead focusing on the ways in which Auxiliadora's art functions as a political intervention that demands how art can represent non-dominant cultures.
