= Parrino =

Parrino is a surname. Notable people with the surname include:

- Andy Parrino (born 1985), American baseball player
- Elian Parrino (born 1988), Argentinian footballer
- Marco Parrino (born 1995), Italian businessman and writer
- Steven Parrino (1958–2005), American artist and musician

== See also ==
- Perrino
- Perino
