= Leo Rover =

Open-source robotic platform manufactured by Fictionlab

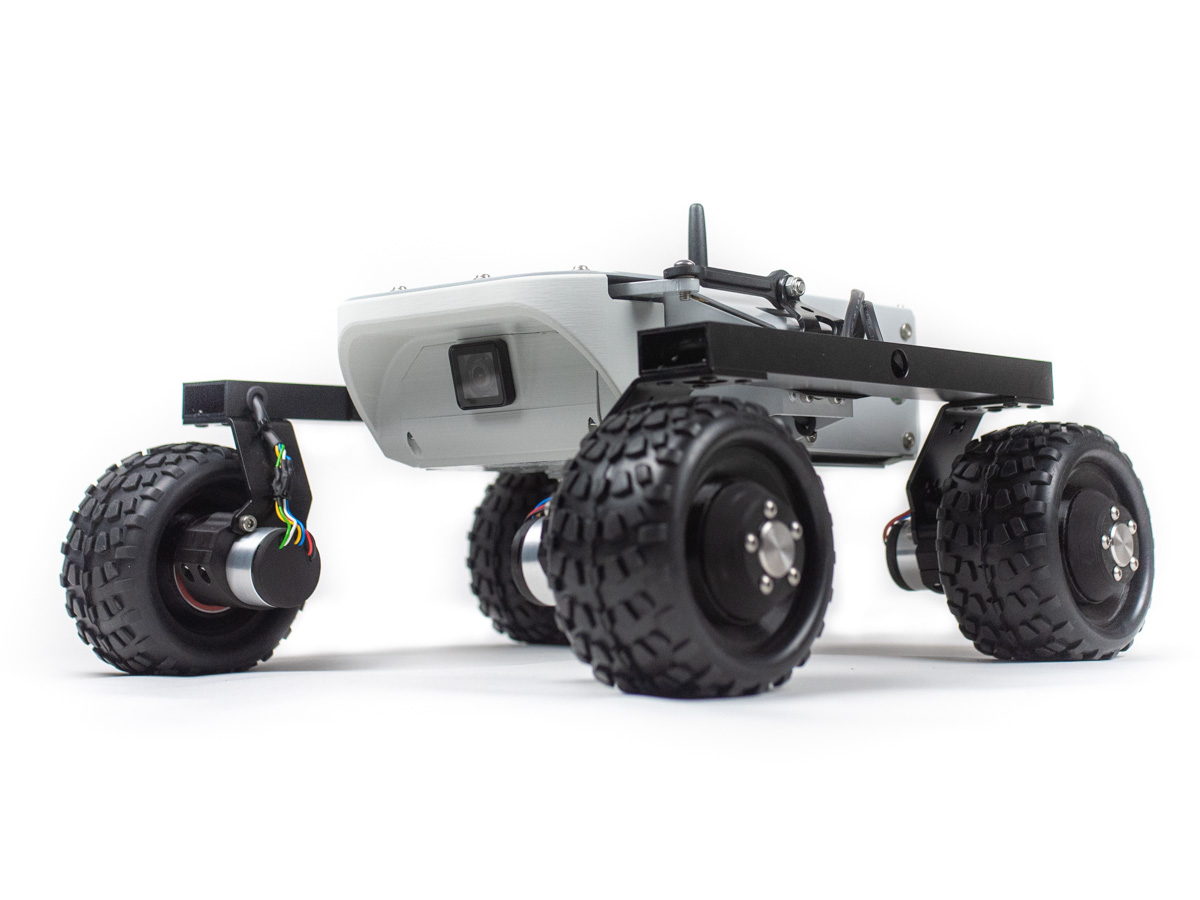
- Developer: fictionlab sp. z o.o.
- Released: 2017
- Operating system: Ubuntu 20.04 + ROS Noetic Ninjammys
- CPU: Quad core Cortex-A72
- Dimensions: 447 x 433 x 249 mm
- Weight: 6.5 kg
- Website: https://www.leorover.tech

Leo Rover is a small-sized, four-wheeled, open-source robotic platform manufactured and developed in Wrocław, Poland, by fictionlab sp. z o.o.

== Design and performance ==
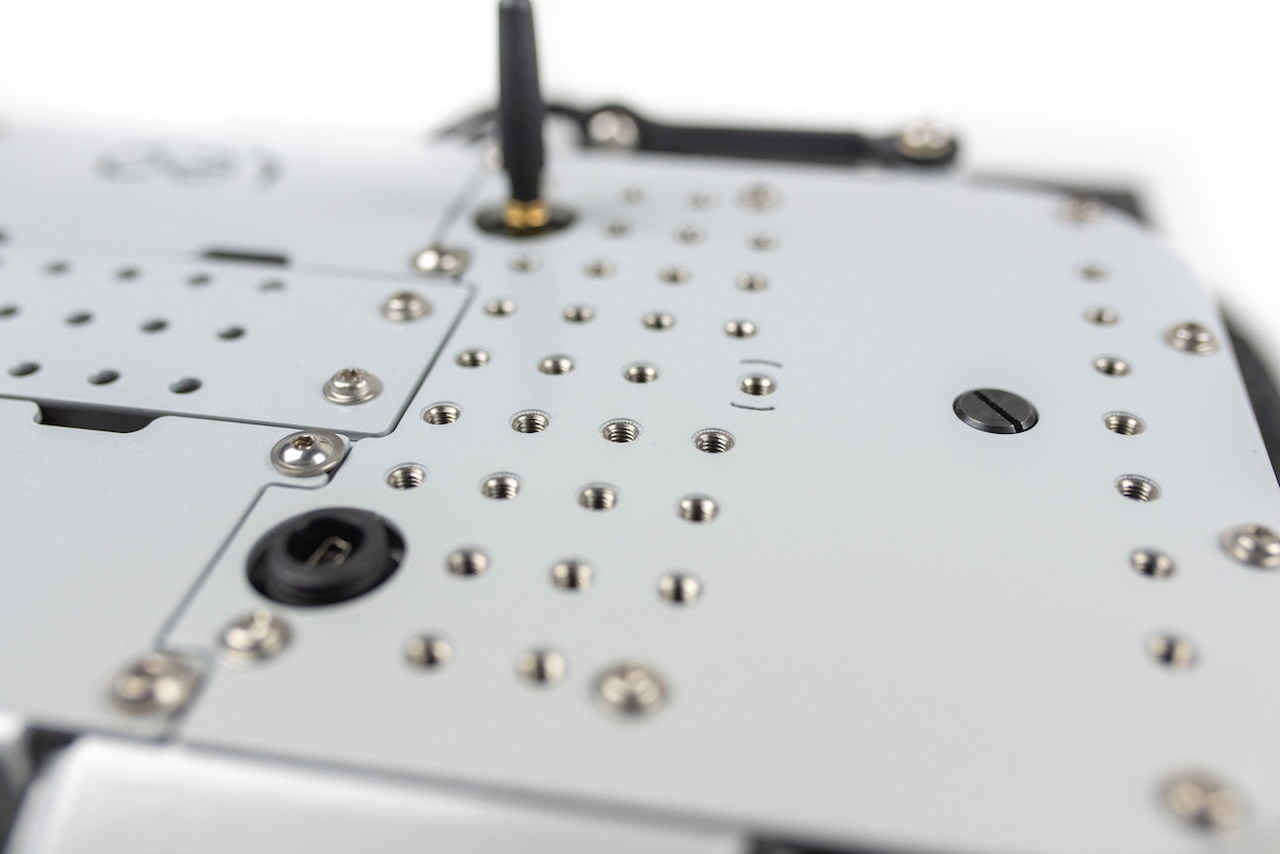
Mounting holes on top of the rover's chassis

The Leo Rover is a small, remotely controlled, four-wheeled rover, measuring 433 mm in length, 447 mm in width, and 249 mm in height. It weighs 6.5 kg and features in-hub DC motors with a 73.2:1 planetary gearbox and 12 CPR encoder to power each wheel. The wheels are made of rubber with foam inserts. The robot is equipped with a 5000 mAh Li-ion battery of 11.1 V DC. It can achieve a maximum linear speed of approximately 0.4 m/s and an angular speed of up to 60 deg/s. The front of the robot's body houses a 5 MPx camera with a 170-degree field of view. The rover's top surface features numerous mounting holes to attach additional hardware, and it has a nominal payload capacity of five kg.

The robot is equipped with a 2.4 GHz WiFi access point with an external antenna. The majority of the robot's structural components are 3D-printed, resulting in a watertight design rated at the IP64 level.

== Software ==
The Leo Rover runs on Ubuntu Linux 20.04 with ROS Noetic Ninjammys, and a Raspberry Pi 4 as its main computer.

== European Rover Challenge ==
From 2020 to 2022, the Leo Rover was the standard robot used in the remote formula of the European Rover Challenge.

== Application area ==
Leo Rover serves as a development platform for implementing one's own technological solutions by connecting external electronics, editing the open-source software, or modifying the robot's design. Although the product is available to both individuals and companies, the majority of the consumers are universities and research facilities that use the robot for their projects and research.
