= Pierini =

Pierini may refer to:

- Pierini (butterflies), a tribe of butterflies within the family Pieridae
- Pierini (surname), Italian surname

== See also ==
- Perini (disambiguation)
- Pierino (disambiguation)
