= Pierino =

Pierino may refer to:

- Pierino (given name), Italian given name
- Pierino, Italian version of Little Johnny

== See also ==
- Perino (disambiguation)
- Pierini (disambiguation)
- Piero (disambiguation)
- Pierrot (disambiguation)
