= BLUEsat UNSW =

UNSW Student Space Projects

Bluesat UNSW
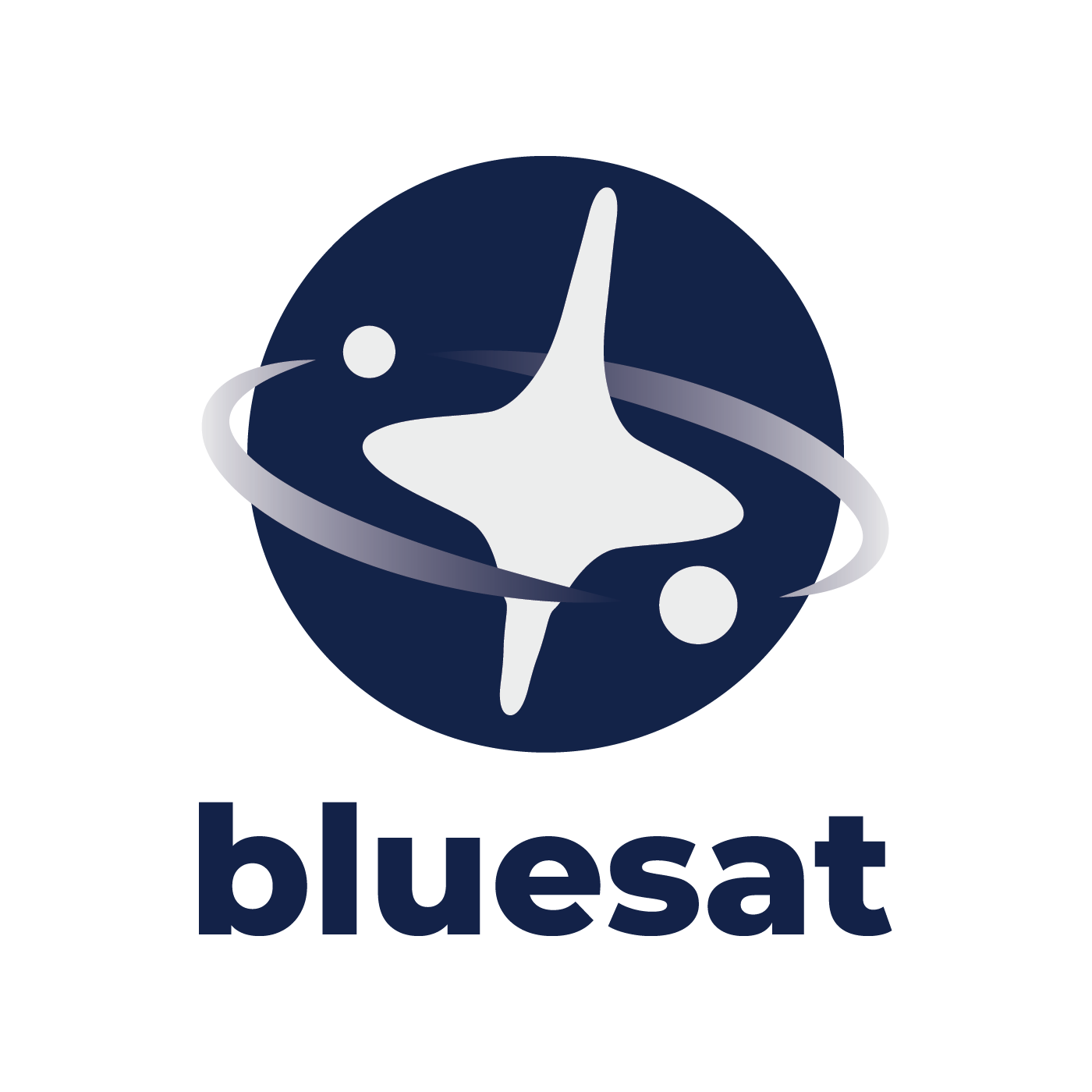
- Mission statement: To give students real-world experience in multi-disciplinary space engineering projects, and promote space technology in Australia.
- Type of project: Space
- Location: Sydney
- Owner: UNSW
- Country: Australia
- Established: 1997
- Funding: UNSW and corporate sponsors
- Status: Active
- Website: bluesat.unsw.edu.au

== Overview ==
The Bluesat project is the University of New South Wales's student space engineering projects group. Bluesat aims to promote the advancement of the Australian Space Sector and give students the opportunity to undertake space engineering projects.

Current projects include a high altitude balloon platform for near-space research and testing, a rover design for international competitions and the further development of our satellite tracking groundstation.

== Current Projects ==
=== High Altitude Balloon ===
Bluesat's high altitude balloon platform is designed as a modular testbed for space hardware and high altitude research. The platform will contain all telemetry instrumentation for flight tracking including an ADSB transceiver as well as hardware for monitoring internal and external temperature, altitude and atmospheric pressure. Following preliminary testing, the platform will support the near-space testing of space hardware and allow for advanced data collection on the atmospheric conditions of the Earth.

=== Off-World Robotics ===
Bluesat's Off-World robotics team is involved in the design and manufacture of rovers for traversing and completing a variety of tasks on a simulated lunar surface. The team previously participated in competitions from 2015 to 2018, and is active again as of 2024 in the Australian Rover Challenge. They placed 14th in ARCh 2025 and 10th in 2026.

=== Groundstation ===
One of Bluesat's oldest projects, the satellite tracking groundstation allows Bluesat to manage data transfer up and down from satellites. Currently, the team is focused on developing a smaller, portable groundstation that may also be used to communicate with the High Altitude Balloon and Off-World Robotics rover.

== Past projects ==
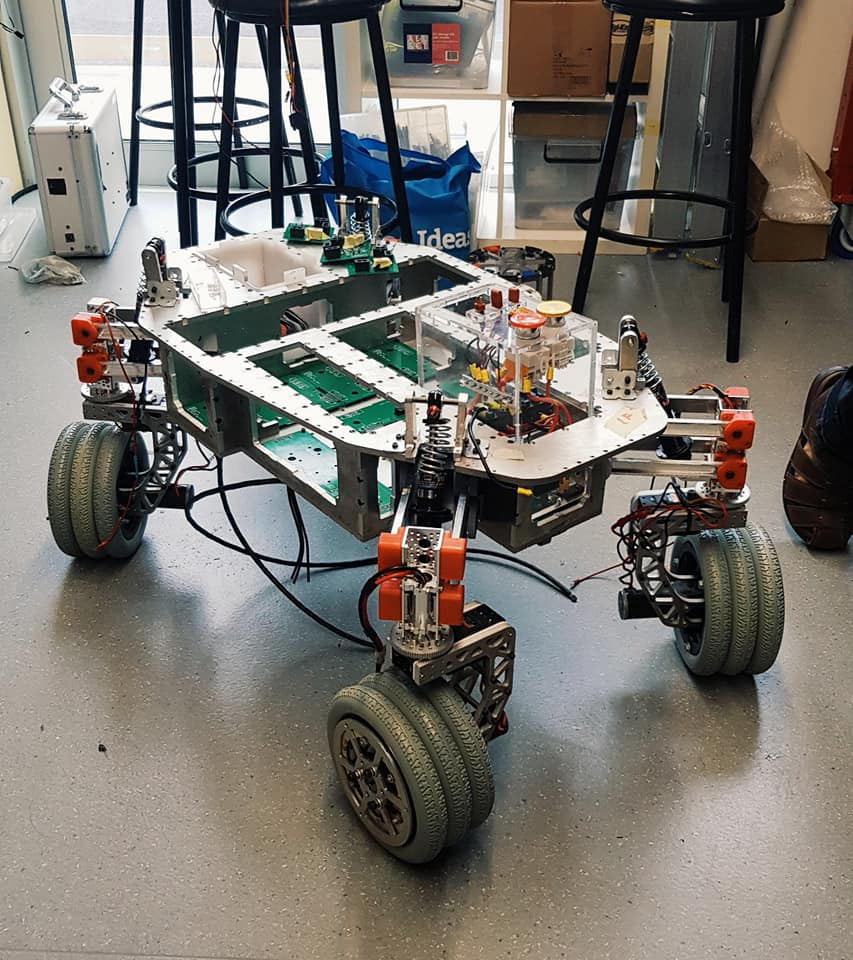
Bluesat UNSW's BLUEtongue Rover

Bluesat's ground station team assisted in the tracking of and communications with the ECO360 satellite for ACSER.

Bluesat's Off-World Robotics team has been involved in several rover platform designs for various competitions. Bluesat's rover BLUEtounge participated in the European Rover Challenge from 2015 to 2018. The team came 16th out of 40 in 2015, 9th in 2016 and 8th in 2018.

In 2019 Bluesat collaborated with Biosphere UNSW and AIAA Rocketry UNSW to launch a 2U CubeSat on a rocket for the THUNDA 2019 rocket launch competition. The ADCS team also designed a detumble system for the rocket however it was not tested in that project. Their design is kept for future projects.

Other previous projects include an attitude control system for the Waratah Seed project and a CubeSat design for the Japanese Satellite Design Competition (Satcon).

More recently, Bluesat's satellite team developed a 4U CubeSat payload as a collaboration with the UNSW Rocketry Team for their entry to the Spaceport America Cup in 2023. The payload served as a proof of concept for UV resin 3D printing in microgravity and was flown to 30,000 ft in the competition.

Bluesat has been launching High Altitude Balloons (HABs) since 2012, with the most recent launch in 2025, launched from Rankin Springs, NSW, to an altitude of over 110,000 ft.

== Current Executives ==
- James Hanlon - President
- Matthew Karl Reyes - Chief Technical Officer
- Sophie Fox - Vice President (Operations)
- Asha Chiu - Vice President (Engagement)
- Eugene Ly - Vice President (Marketing)
- Evan La Fontaine - Treasurer
- Helena Esber - Welfare and Administrative Officer

== Current Team Leads ==
- Caitlin Irawan - High Altitude Balloon
- Shawn Hutton - Off-World Robotics
- James Rouse - Groundstation
- Luc Tran - Satellite

== Competition results ==
Year	Competition	Ranking
2015	European Rover Challenge	16th
2016	European Rover Challenge	9th
2018	European Rover Challenge	8th
2025	Australian Rover Challenge	14th
