= Perrino =

Perrino is an Italian surname. Notable people with the surname include:

- Giuseppe Perrino (1992–2021), Italian footballer
- Joseph Perrino (born 1982), American actor
- Robert Perrino (1938–1992), American mobster

== See also ==
- Parrino
- Perino
