= Volpi =

Volpi is a surname of Italian origin, meaning foxes or of the fox. The name refers to:

- Alberto Volpi (b. 1962), Italian road bicycle racer
- Albino Volpi (1889–1939), Italian fascist and early supporter of Benito Mussolini
- Alessandro Volpi (b. 1963), Italian politician and historian
- Alfredo Volpi (1896–1988), Italian-Brazilian modernist painter
- Alice Volpi (b. 1992), Italian right-handed foil fencer
- Bruno Volpi (b. 1993), Argentine professional footballer
- Charles P. de Volpi (1911–1981), Canadian philatelist
- Christian Volpi (b. 1965), French water polo player
- Demis Volpi, German-Argentine choreographer
- Francesco Volpi (b. 1972), Italian designer (Strategic and graphic design)
- Franco Volpi (actor) (1921–1997), Italian actor and voice actor
- Franco Volpi (philosopher) (1952-2009), Italian philosopher, historian of philosophy and professor
- Gabriele Volpi (born 1943), Italian-born Nigerian businessman
- Giacomo Lauri-Volpi (1892–1979), Italian operatic tenor
- Giovanni Volpi (b. 1938), Italian automobile racing manager
- Giovanni Antonio Volpi (1686–1766), Italian editor and poet
- Giovanni Pietro Volpi (1585–1636), Roman Catholic prelate
- Giulia Volpi (b. 1970), Italian gymnast
- Giuseppe Volpi (1877–1947), Italian politician
- Giuseppe Volpi (sailor) (1908–unknown), Italian sailor
- Grazia Volpi (1941–2020), Italian film producer
- Guido Volpi (b. 1995), Argentine rugby union footballer
- Jorge Volpi (b. 1968), Mexican novelist and essayist
- Marisa Volpi (1928–2015), Italian art historian and writer
- Mike Volpi (b. 1966), Italian-American venture capitalist
- Piero Volpi (b. 1952), Italian footballer and physician
- Roberto Volpi (b. 1952), Italian predominantly steeplechase runner
- Sergio Volpi (b. 1974), Italian professional football player
- Tiago Volpi (b. 1990), Brazilian professional football player
- Ulpiano Volpi or Volpiano Volpi (1559–1629), Italian Roman Catholic prelate
