= Raquel Trindade =

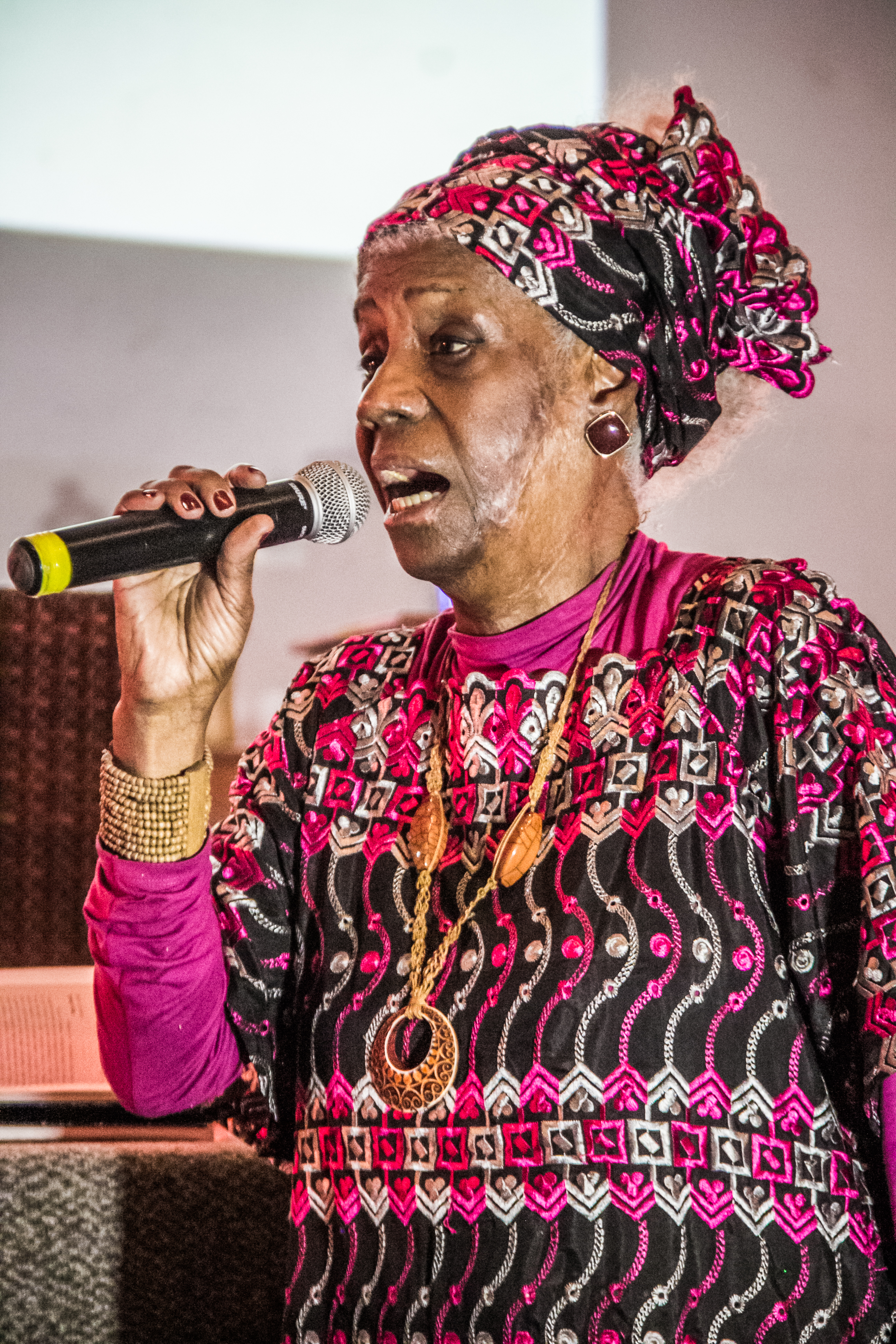
- Trindade during an evening event at the Festival Latinidades 2014
- Born: Raquel Trindade de Souza; 10 August 1936; Recife, Pernambuco, Brazil
- Died: 15 April 2018 (aged 81); Embu das Artes, São Paulo, Brazil
- Occupation(s): Artist, folklorist, writer
- Parent: Solano Trindade (father)

Raquel Trindade de Souza, a Kambinda (10 August 1936, Recife – 15 April 2018, Embu das Artes) was a Brazilian artist, activist, choreographer, Carnaval bloc organizer, folklorist, plastic artist, and writer. She was the daughter of poet and folklorist Solano Trindade.

== Biography ==
Trindade was the daughter of Solano Trindade and Maria Margarida Trindade, an occupational therapist. With her family, she moved to the city of Duque de Caxias in the 1940s. In the 1960s, she moved to Embu das Artes, where in 1975 she founded the Teatro Popular Solano Trindade (TPST). In Embu das Artes as well, she founded the Kambinda Maracatu Nação Carnaval group.

As a painter, she had her first individual exhibition in 1966. In the same year, she had a work of hers acquired by art curator Pietro Maria Bardi and founded, along with Ranulfo Lira and Chico Rosa, the Artes da Praça da República movement in São Paulo.

She continued expanding the reach of her work in the following years. At the same time, she participated in a diverse range of events and debates about Afro-Brazilian culture, which brought the opportunity for Trindade to create an extension course about folklore, Black theater and syncretic religions such as candomblé at the State University of Campinas (Unicamp) in 1985. This university initiative was met with backlash by a large number of the faculty.

While at Unicamp, she created the cultural organization Urucungos, Puítas e Quinjengues, the name coming from several Bantu musical instruments. She also lectured at the Federal University of São Carlos, Anhembi Morumbi University, and the University of São Paulo. She taught at local schools in Embu das Artes about the culture and history of Black people in Brazil.

Trindade married 8 times and had 3 children. Her grandson is rapper Zinho Trindade.

In 2012, she was awarded the Commander class of the Order of Cultural Merit.

Trindade died on 15 April 2018 in Embu das Artes due to complications from heart surgery.

== Works ==
- Embu: de Aldeia de M'Boy a Terra das Artes - Noovha América Editora, 2011
