= Perino =

Perino may refer to:

- Perino Model 1908, an early Italian machine gun
- Perino del Vaga (nickname of Piero Bonaccorsi; 1501–1547), Italian painter and draughtsman
- Perino's, a former restaurant in Los Angeles, California
- Perino (surname), an Italian surname

== See also ==
- Perinone, a class of organic compounds
- Pierino (disambiguation)
