= Piero =

Piero is an Italian given name. Notable people with the name include:

- Piero Angela (1928–2022), Italian television host
- Piero Barucci (1933–2026), Italian academic and politician
- Piero Cari (born 2007), Peruvian footballer
- Piero Cassano (born 1948), Italian keyboardist, singer and composer, a founding member of the Genoan band Matia Bazar
- Piero del Pollaiuolo (c. 1443–1496), Italian painter
- Piero della Francesca (c. 1415–1492), Italian artist of the Early Renaissance
- Piero de Benedictis (1945–2026), Italian-born Argentine and Colombian folk singer
- Piero Ciampi (1934–1980), Italian singer
- Piero di Cosimo (1462–1522), also known as Piero di Lorenzo, Italian Renaissance painter
- Piero di Cosimo de' Medici (1416–1469), de facto ruler of Florence from 1464 to 1469
- Piero Ferrari (born 1945), Italian businessman
- Piero Focaccia (born 1944), Italian pop singer
- Piero Fornasetti (1913–1988), Italian painter
- Piero Gardoni (1934–1994), Italian professional footballer
- Piero Golia (born 1974), Italian conceptual artist
- Piero Gros (born 1954), Italian alpine skier
- Piero Hincapié (born 2002), Ecuadorian footballer
- Piero the Unfortunate (1472–1503), Gran maestro of Florence
- Piero Mingoia (born 1991), English footballer
- Piero Manzoni (1933–1963), Italian artist
- Piero Pelù (born 1962), Italian singer
- Piero Piccioni (1921–2004), Italian film score composer
- Piero Sraffa (1898–1983), Italian economist
- Piero Scaruffi (born 1955), Italian-American freelance software consultant and university lecturer
- Piero Soderini (1450–1522), Italian statesman
- Maestro Piero (c. 1300–c. 1350), known as Piero, Italian medieval composer
- Piero Umiliani (1926–2001), Italian composer
- Piero Volpi (born 1952), Italian footballer and physician

== See also ==
- San Piero (disambiguation)
- Pierino (given name)
- Del Piero
