= Pierino (given name) =

Pierino is an Italian given name. Notable people with the name include:

- Pierino Albini (1885–1955), Italian racing cyclist
- Pierino Baffi (1930–1985), Italian professional road bicycle racer
- Pierino Belli (1502–1575), Italian soldier and jurist
- Pierino Favalli (1914–1986), Italian road cyclist
- Pierino Ferioli (1904–1985), Italian racing cyclist
- Pierino Gaspard (born 1954), Italian wheelchair curler and alpine skier
- Pierino Prati (1946–2020), Italian footballer
- Pierino da Vinci (c. 1529–1553/54), Italian sculptor

== See also ==
- Piero
- Pierino (disambiguation)
