= Perini =

Perini may refer to:

== People ==
- Fabio Perini (born 1940), Italian entrepreneur and inventor
- Flora Perini (1887–1975), Italian operatic mezzo-soprano
- Lorenzo Perini (1994-), Italian hurdler
- Norberto Perini (1888–1977), Italian Catholic Archbishop
- Pete Perini (1928–2008), American football player

== Other ==
- Perini, Croatia, a village in Istria
- Perini (dance), an Indian classical dance form
- Tutor Perini Corporation
  - Perini Building Company
- Perini Journal, a trade publication for the tissue paper industry
- Perini Navi, shipbuilder

== See also ==
- Pierini (disambiguation)
