= Embu das Artes =

Municipality in the Brazilian state of São Paulo

- Municipality
- Municipality of Embu das Artes
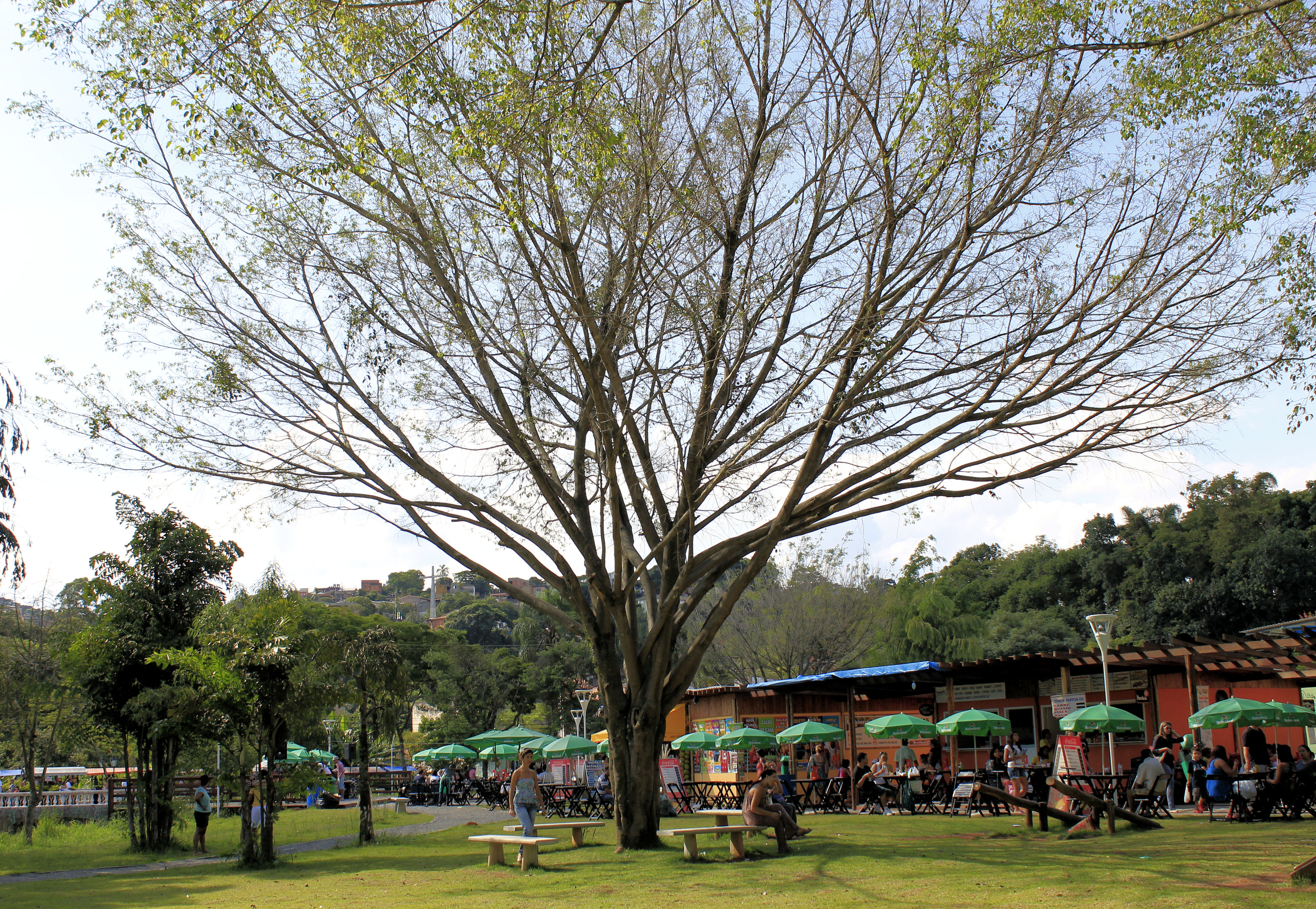
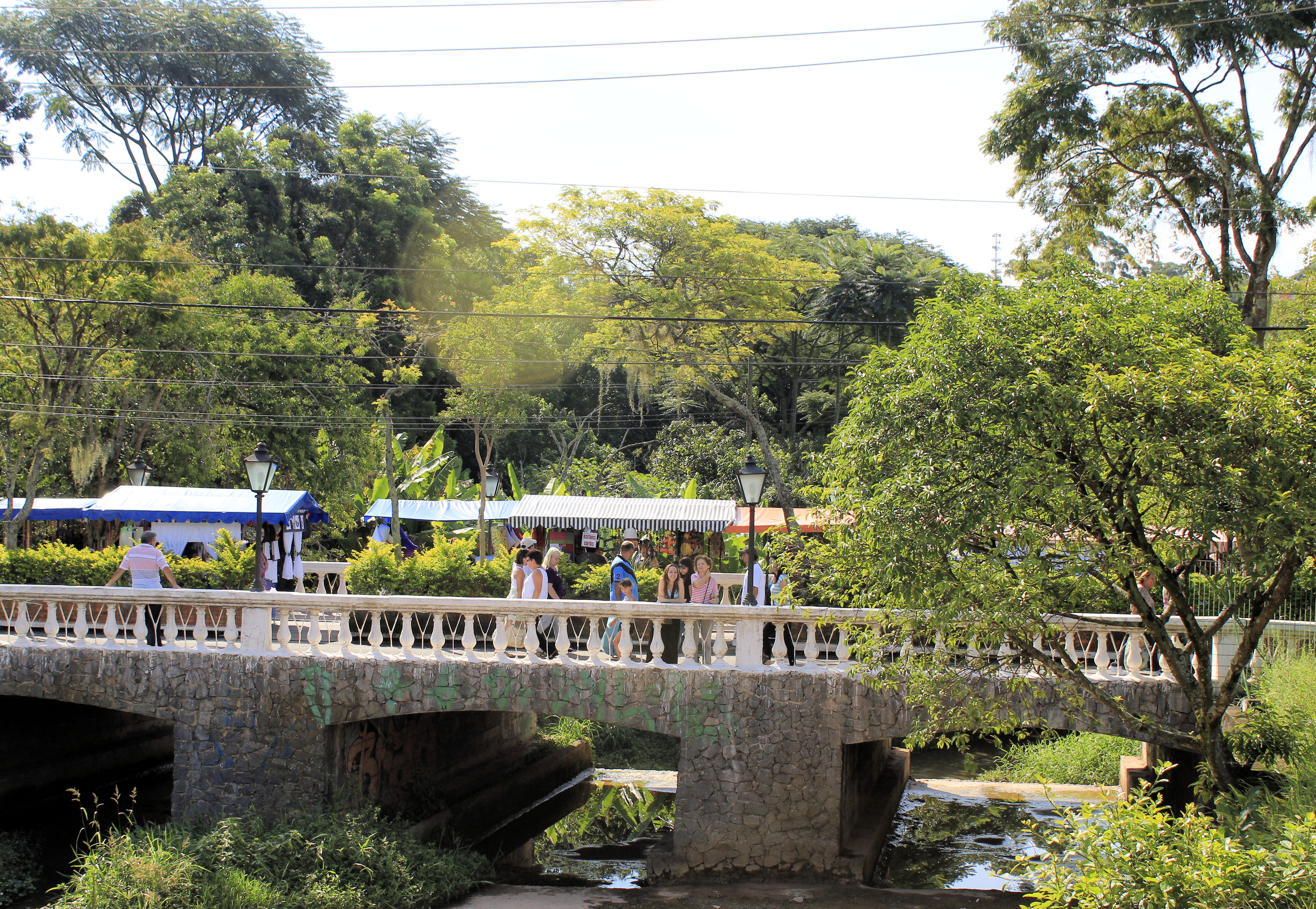
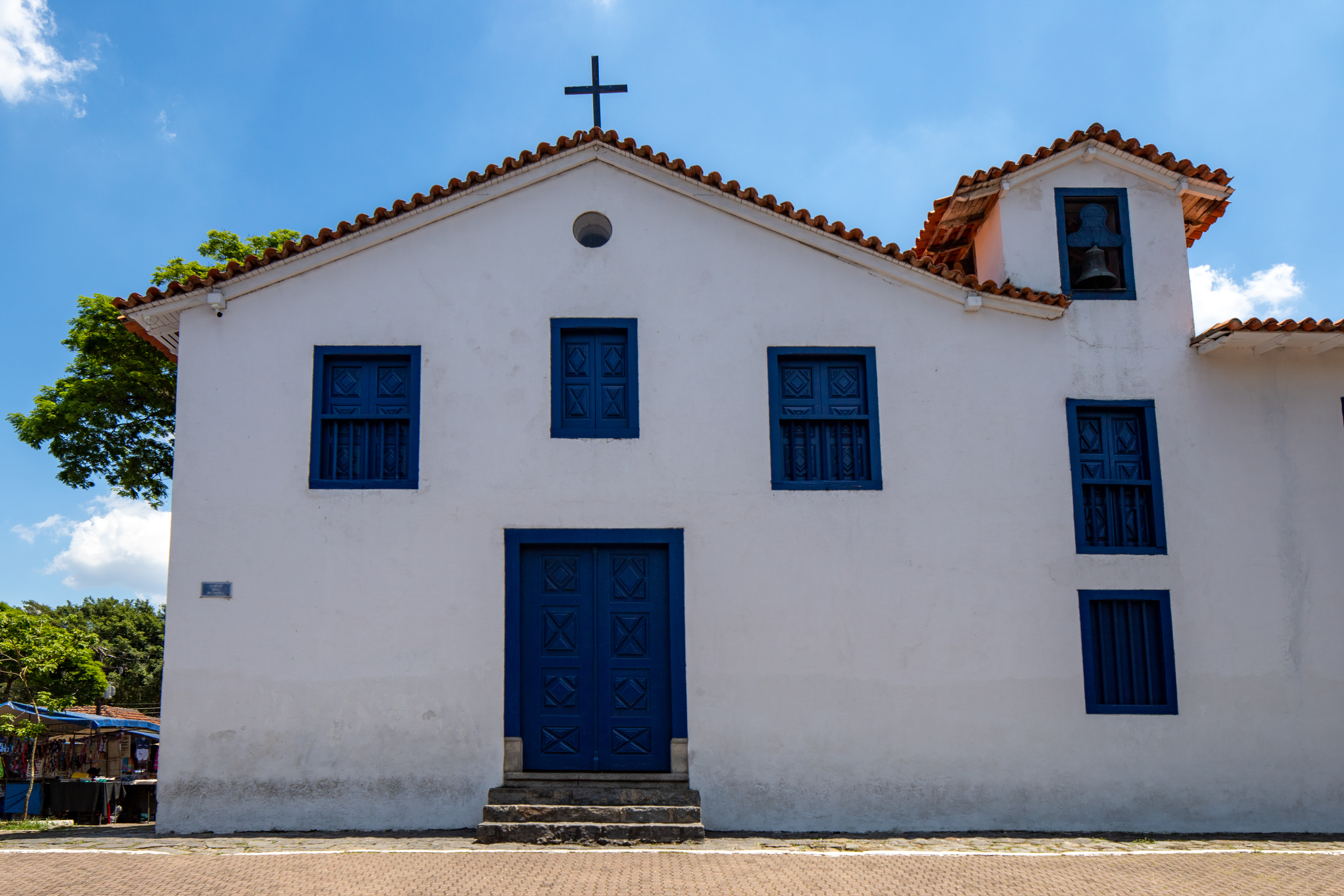
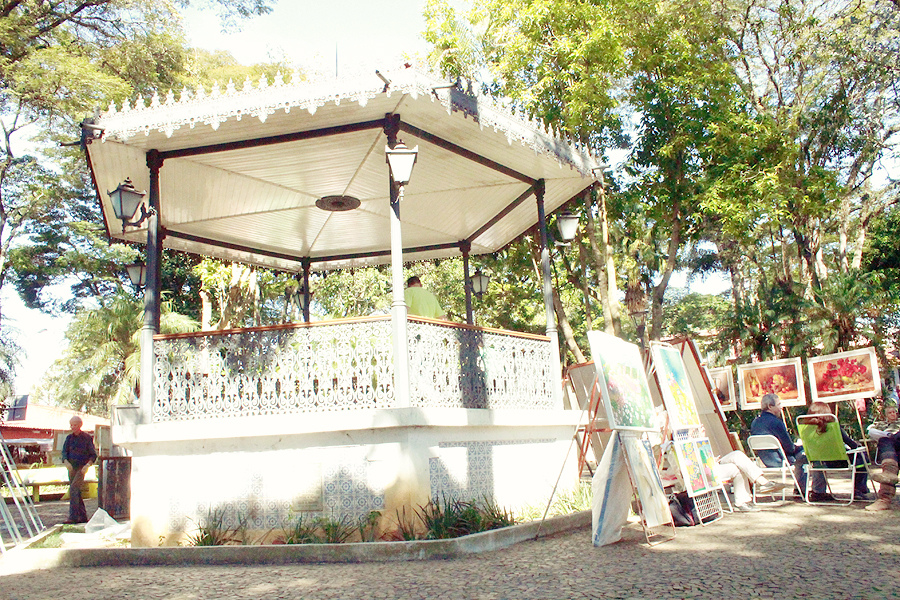
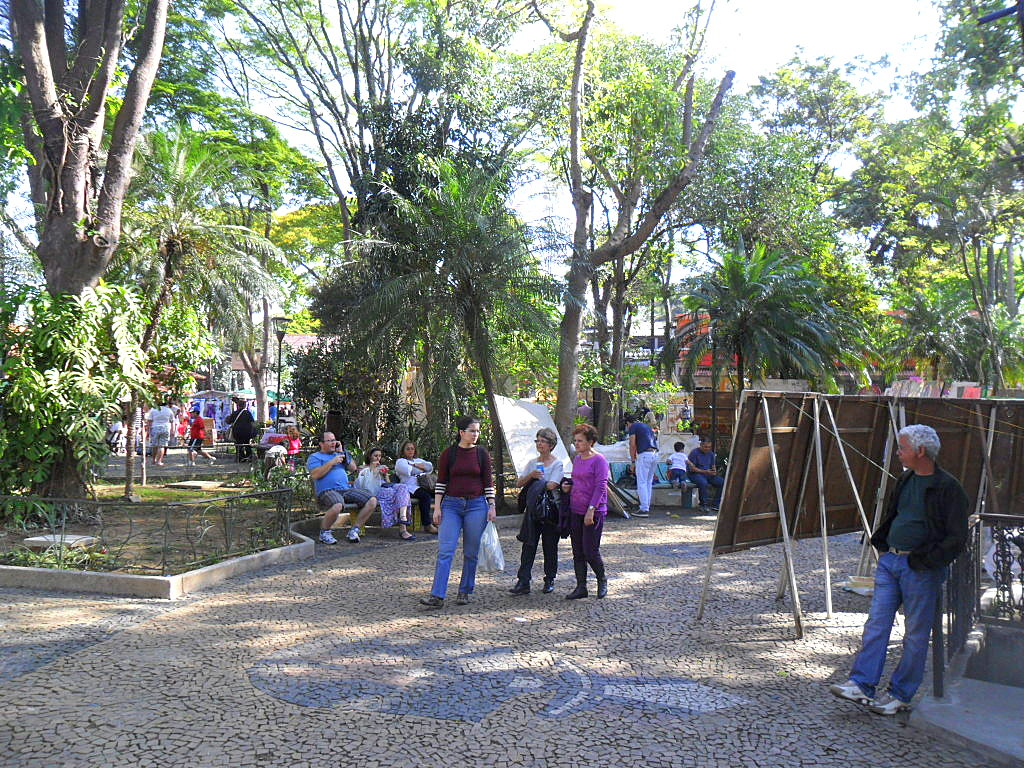
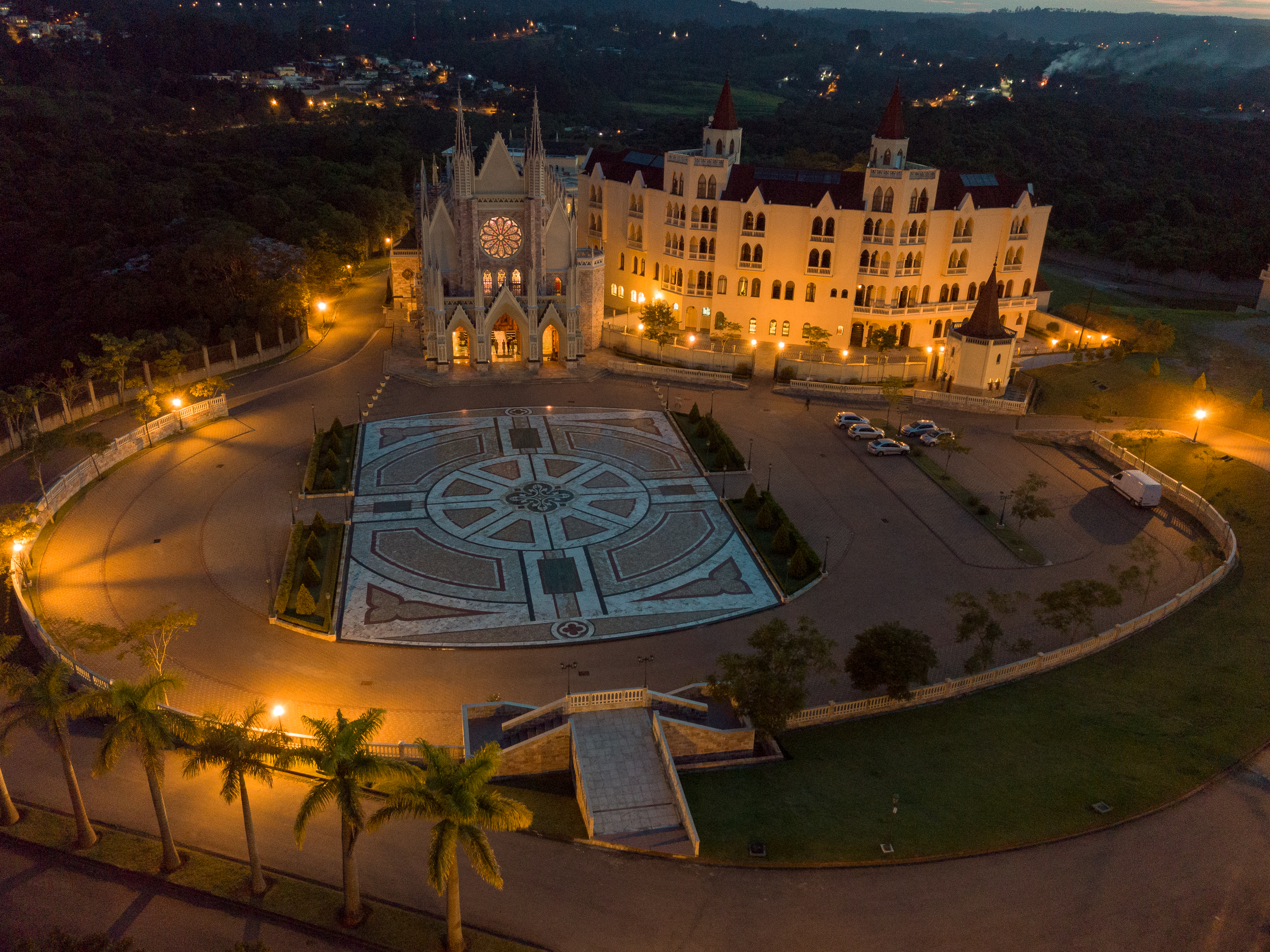
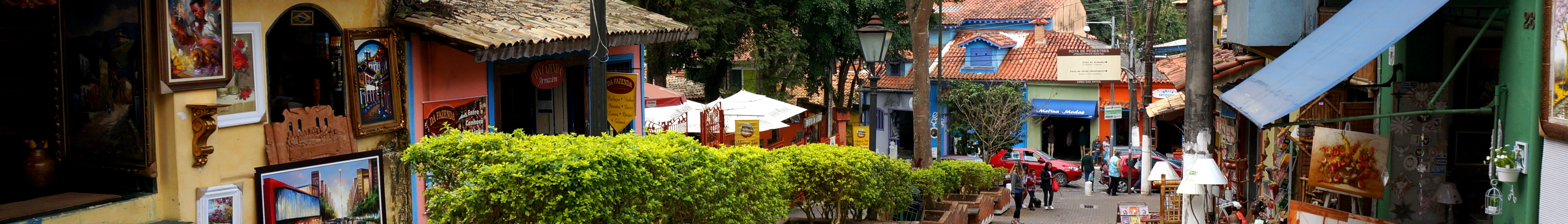

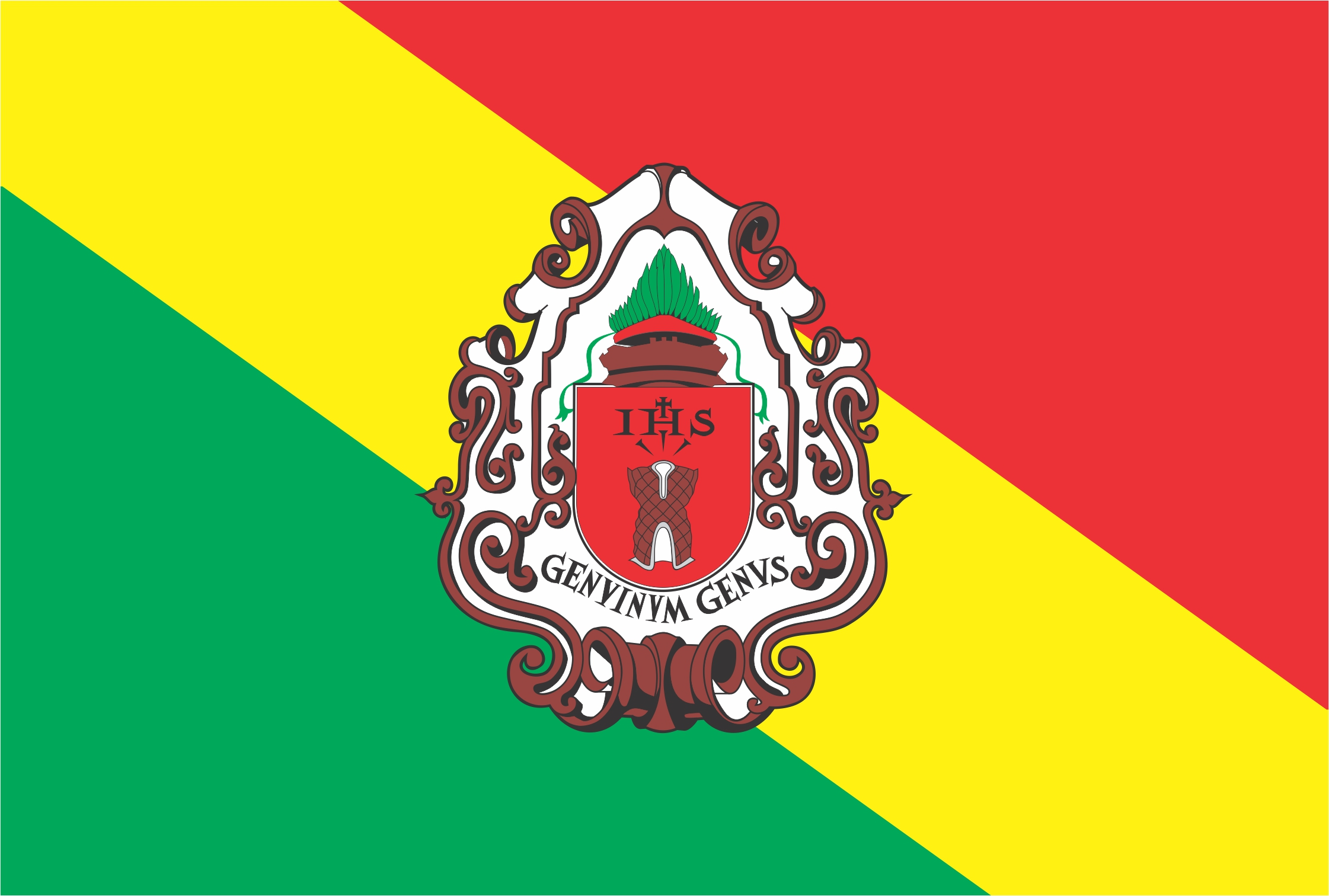
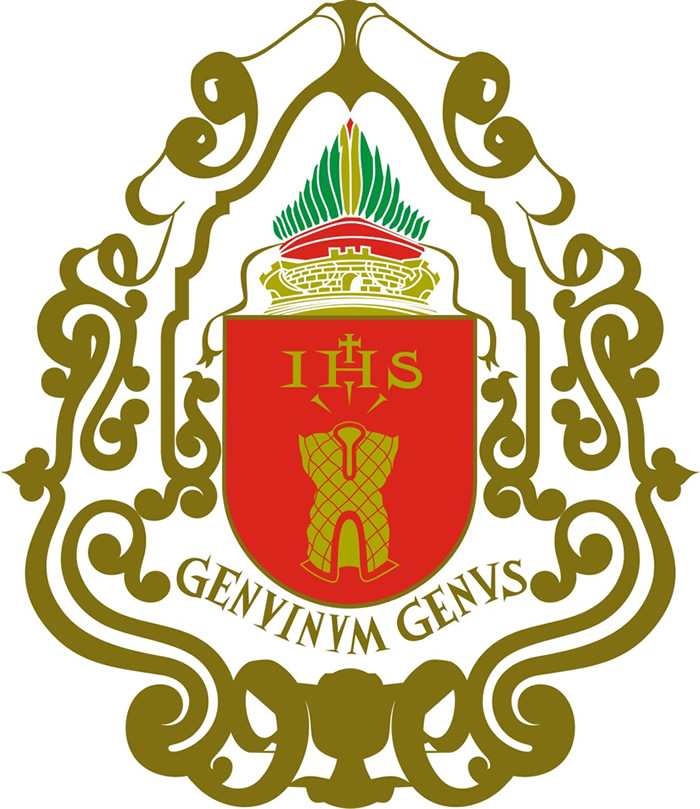
- Flag Coat of arms
- Motto: Genynum Genys
- Location in São Paulo
- Coordinates: 23°38′56″S 46°51′07″W
- Country: Brazil
- Region: Southeast
- State: São Paulo
- Metropolitan Region: São Paulo
- Founded: 18 February 1959; 67 years ago

Government
  - Mayor: Ney Costa Santos (Better known as "Ney Santos) (Republicans) (Brazil)

Area
  - Total: 70.40 km^{2} (27.18 sq mi)
- Elevation: 775 m (2,543 ft)

Population (2022 Brazilian census)
  - Total: 250,691
  - Estimate (2025): 259,788
  - Density: 3,561/km^{2} (9,223/sq mi)
- Time zone: UTC−3 (BRT)
- Website: cidadeembudasartes.sp.gov.br

Embu das Artes, previously and commonly known simply as Embu, is a Brazilian municipality in the State of São Paulo. It is part of the Metropolitan Region of São Paulo. The population is 259,788 (2025 est.) in an area of 70.40 km^{2}.

Its history brought it a specialization as a city for artists. This has contributed to tourism in the city.

== History ==
The history of Embu began in 1554, with the arrival of a group of Jesuits of the aldeamento or settlement of Bohi, later M'Boy, halfway between the sea and the São Paulo hinterlands. As the Jesuit missions in the interior of Brazil, the primary objective was to convert the native population to Roman Catholicism, in an attempt to use them as farm workers in the region.

In 1607 the lands of the village passed to the hands of Fernão Dias (uncle of the bandeirante Fernão Dias, the emerald hunter), In 1690, the priest Belchior de Pontes initiated the construction of the Igreja do Rosário (the Church of the Rosary), when it transferred at the same time to the nucleus of the original village. In 1760, by order of the Portuguese Crown, the Jesuits were expelled from Brazil because they interfered in colonist affairs, such as protecting converted natives from the Bandeiras, which sought to enslave them.

The artistic vocation of the city started to project itself in 1937, when Cássio M'Boy, "santeiro" – sculptor of religious images – in Embu, gained first prize at the Exposition Internationel d'Arts Techniques du Paris. Before that, Cássio had been the professor of some renowned artists and received illustrious representatives of the Modernismo movement of 1922, including Anita Malfatti, Tarsila do Amaral, Oswald de Andrade, Menotti Del Picchia, Volpi and Yoshio Takaoka.

One of Cássio M'Boy's most successful disciples was Sakai de Embu, internationally known and one of the greatest Brazilian ceramist-sculptors. In 1962, Sakai formed the Solano Trindade group of plastic artists, highly influenced by African-Brazilian art and the religious tradition of the Yoruba orishahs. This group included Solano Trindade and later his daughter Raquel Trindade.

The artistic tradition of Embu is an institution with projects and events done both in Brazil and abroad since 1964. The Feira de Artes and Artesanato do Embu (Arts and Handicraft of Embu) was launched in the late 1960s and it has been attracting tourists and revenues to the city ever since.

One of the top Nazi torturers, Josef Mengele was buried in the Nossa Senhora do Rosario cemetery in Embu under his false identity, Wolfgang Gerhard, as the southern region of the city of São Paulo and its borders are known for a sizable German-Brazilian population.

== Media ==
In telecommunications, the city was served by Companhia Telefônica Brasileira until 1973, when it began to be served by Telecomunicações de São Paulo. In July 1998, this company was acquired by Telefónica, which adopted the Vivo brand in 2012.

The company is currently an operator of cell phones, fixed lines, internet (fiber optics/4G) and television (satellite and cable).

== See also ==
- List of municipalities in São Paulo
