= Tadakiyo Sakai =

Tadakiyo Sakai (5 January 1914, Nagasaki – 2 May 1981), also known as Sakai de Embu, was a Japanese-Brazilian sculptor.

== Biography ==
From a young age, Sakai showed a liking towards painting, design, and sculpture. At 14 years old, he immigrated to Brazil, where he lived in the Pinheiros district of São Paulo, later settling in Embu das Artes. Recognized internationally as a sculptor in terracotta, he began his art career in 1951 under the guidance of Cássio M'Boy, Bruno Giorgi, and Victor Brecheret. He frequently collaborated with Afro-Brazilian artists such as Solano Trindade and incorporated Black designs and traditions into his works.

== Legacy ==
The Memorial Sakai in the central area of Embu das Artes is a museum and school established to honour Sakai. The city also has the Tadakiyo Sakai State School, situated in the Vila Olinda neighborhood.
