= San Piero =

San Piero may refer to:

- San Piero a Sieve, frazione of Scarperia e San Piero, Metropolitan City of Florence, Tuscany, Italy
- San Piero Patti, municipality in the Metropolitan City of Messina in the Italian region Sicily, Italy
- San Piero a Grado, church in Pisa, Tuscany, Italy

== See also ==
- San Pier (disambiguation)
- San Pietro (disambiguation)
- Piero (disambiguation)
