= Perino (surname) =

Perino is a surname. Notable people with the surname include:

- Dana Perino (born 1975), American press secretary and broadcaster
- Davide Perino (born 1981), Italian actor
- Gregory Perino (1914–2005), American archaeologist
- Luc Perino (born 1947), French physician, essayist, and novelist
- Maria Antonietta Perino, Italian aerospace engineer
- Mary Jo Perino, sports journalist
- Paolo Perino (born 1988), Italian male rower

== See also ==
- Perino (disambiguation)
- Pierini (surname)
