= Pierini (surname) =

Pierini is a surname. Notable people with the surname include:

- Alessandro Pierini (born 1973), Italian retired footballer
- Gabriel Pierini (born 2000), Brazilian footballer
- Gastone Pierini (1899–1967), Italian lightweight weightlifter
- Nicholas Pierini (born 1998), Italian footballer
- Nicolette Pierini (born 2003), American child actress and performer

== See also ==
- Perino (surname)
