= Piero Volpi =

Italian footballer and physician

Personal information
- Full name: Piero Volpi
- Date of birth: 9 June 1952 (age 74)
- Place of birth: Milan, Italy
- Position: Defender

Youth career
- 196?–1971: Varese

Senior career*
Years	Team	Apps	(Gls)
1971–1973	Ignis Varese	34+	(?)
1973–1974	Casertana	34	(2)
1974–1977	Lecco	112	(7)
1977–1979	Ternana	73	(1)
1979–1981	Como	67	(2)
1981–1983	Reggiana	50	(1)
1983–1985	Novara	65	(4)
1985–1986	Iris Borgoticino	?	(?)
1986–1987	Verbania	?	(?)
- * Club domestic league appearances and goals

Piero Volpi (born June 9, 1952) is an Italian physician, surgeon, and former football player who played as a defender.

== Professional football ==
After taking his first steps in Varese's youth ranks, Volpi transferred to the amateur team Ignis Varese in 1971, where he played for two seasons. During the 1973–1974 season, he made his Serie C debut, playing in 34 matches and scoring 2 goals for Casertana, which, at the end of the season, transferred him to Lecco, where he appeared in all 38 rounds of the 1974–1975 championship, scoring 1 goal.

He later played in the 1977–1978 (35 matches and 1 goal) and 1978–1979 (38 matches) Serie B seasons while playing for Ternana. In the summer of 1979, he transferred to Como, where he played in all 38 matches and scored 2 goals, helping the team earn promotion to Serie A. During the 1980–1981 season, Volpi made his only 29 appearances in the top flight, without scoring any goals.

At the end of the season, he was signed by Reggiana, with whom he played two more seasons in Serie B. At the end of his time in Emilia, he initially received an offer to play for Parma, a very ambitious team competing in Serie C1 and led by a young coach, Arrigo Sacchi, but he ultimately turned down the offer and, at age 31, signed with Novara, a team competing in Serie C2, where he remained for two seasons, making 65 appearances and scoring 4 goals.

== Sports doctor ==
Volpi had a classical high school education and held a degree in medicine and surgery, which he earned from the University of Perugia at the age of 27. In addition, he completed a specialization in orthopedics and traumatology at the University of Milan, with an emphasis on sports medicine. After his career as a soccer player, he served as team doctor for Inter Milan from 1995 to 2000 and returned to the club beginning with the 2014–2015 season. He was the doctor responsible for treating Ronaldo after a serious injury he sustained while playing for Inter and ensured that Ronaldo was fit to play in the 2002 FIFA World Cup, helping Brazil secure its fifth World Cup title.

He has been working as a medical consultant for the Italian Players' Association (AIC) since 2000, and serves as an instructor for medical courses at the International Federation of Association Football (FIFA) and as a member of the Biochemical Anti-Doping Commission and the Medical and Scientific Commission of the Italian Football Federation (FIGC).

== Honours ==
=== Player ===
==== International ====
Lecco

- Anglo-Italian Cup: 1977

==== Domestic ====
Como

- Serie B: 1979–80

Lecco

- Coppa Italia Serie C: 1976-1977
