= Brazil at the 2022 FIFA World Cup =

Matches of the Brazil national football team in the 2022 FIFA World Cup

The following article concerns the performance of Brazil at the 2022 FIFA World Cup. The men's national football team reached the quarter-finals, eventually being knocked out by Croatia in penalties shoot-out.

== Squad ==
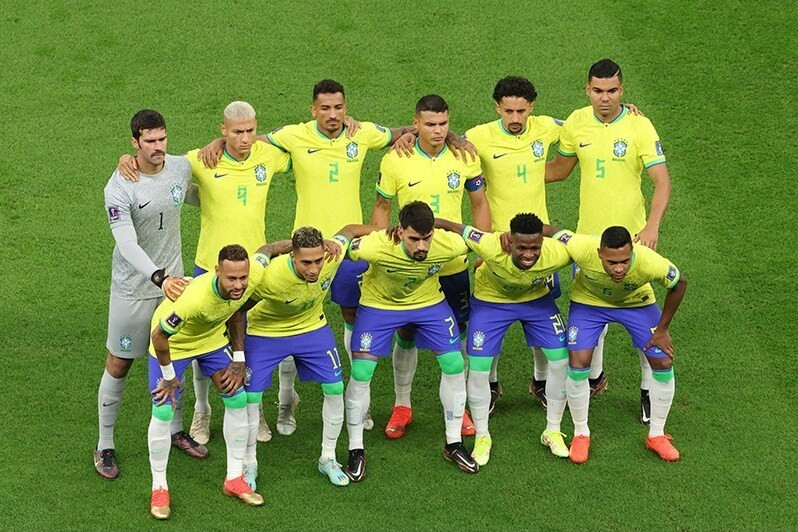
The Brazil starting XI for their first group match

Coach: Tite

Brazil announced their final squad on 7 November 2022.

No.	Pos.	Player	Date of birth (age)	Caps	Goals	Club
1	GK	Alisson	2 October 1992 (aged 30)	57	0	(The Football Association) Liverpool
2	DF	Danilo	15 July 1991 (aged 31)	46	1	(Italian Football Federation) Juventus
3	DF	Thiago Silva (captain)	22 September 1984 (aged 38)	109	7	(The Football Association) Chelsea
4	DF	Marquinhos	14 May 1994 (aged 28)	71	5	(French Football Federation) Paris Saint-Germain
5	MF	Casemiro	23 February 1992 (aged 30)	65	5	(The Football Association) Manchester United
6	DF	Alex Sandro	26 January 1991 (aged 31)	37	2	(Italian Football Federation) Juventus
7	MF	Lucas Paquetá	27 August 1997 (aged 25)	35	7	(The Football Association) West Ham United
8	MF	Fred	5 March 1993 (aged 29)	28	0	(The Football Association) Manchester United
9	FW	Richarlison	10 May 1997 (aged 25)	38	17	(The Football Association) Tottenham Hotspur
10	FW	Neymar	5 February 1992 (aged 30)	121	75	(French Football Federation) Paris Saint-Germain
11	FW	Raphinha	14 December 1996 (aged 25)	11	5	(Royal Spanish Football Federation) Barcelona
12	GK	Weverton	13 December 1987 (aged 34)	8	0	(Brazilian Football Confederation) Palmeiras
13	DF	Dani Alves	6 May 1983 (aged 39)	124	8	(Mexican Football Federation) UNAM
14	DF	Éder Militão	18 January 1998 (aged 24)	23	1	(Royal Spanish Football Federation) Real Madrid
15	MF	Fabinho	23 October 1993 (aged 29)	28	0	(The Football Association) Liverpool
16	DF	Alex Telles	15 December 1992 (aged 29)	8	0	(Royal Spanish Football Federation) Sevilla
17	MF	Bruno Guimarães	16 November 1997 (aged 25)	8	1	(The Football Association) Newcastle United
18	FW	Gabriel Jesus	3 April 1997 (aged 25)	56	19	(The Football Association) Arsenal
19	FW	Antony	24 February 2000 (aged 22)	11	2	(The Football Association) Manchester United
20	FW	Vinícius Júnior	12 July 2000 (aged 22)	16	1	(Royal Spanish Football Federation) Real Madrid
21	FW	Rodrygo	9 January 2001 (aged 21)	7	1	(Royal Spanish Football Federation) Real Madrid
22	MF	Éverton Ribeiro	10 April 1989 (aged 33)	21	3	(Brazilian Football Confederation) Flamengo
23	GK	Ederson	17 August 1993 (aged 29)	18	0	(The Football Association) Manchester City
24	DF	Bremer	18 March 1997 (aged 25)	1	0	(Italian Football Federation) Juventus
25	FW	Pedro	20 June 1997 (aged 25)	2	1	(Brazilian Football Confederation) Flamengo
26	FW	Gabriel Martinelli	18 June 2001 (aged 21)	3	0	(The Football Association) Arsenal

== Group stage ==
=== Group G ===
Pos	Team	Pld	W	D	L	GF	GA	GD	Pts	Qualification
1	Brazil	3	2	0	1	3	1	+2	6	Advanced to knockout stage
2	Switzerland	3	2	0	1	4	3	+1	6	Advanced to knockout stage
3	Cameroon	3	1	1	1	4	4	0	4	
4	Serbia	3	0	1	2	5	8	−3	1	

Source: FIFA

=== Brazil vs Serbia ===
The teams had met twice before including once in the World Cup, in Brazil's 2–0 group stage victory in 2018. With Serbia playing as Yugoslavia, the sides had met 18 times, including four encounters in FIFA World Cup group stages: in 1930, 1950, 1954 and 1974, with one victory for each and two draws.

After a goalless first half, Richarlison opened the scoring for Brazil in the 62nd minute, when he followed up to finish after Serbian goalkeeper Vanja Milinković-Savić saved Vinícius Júnior's low shot from the left, with Neymar initially creating the chance. Richarlison then made it 2–0 eleven minutes later when he controlled the ball from Vinícius Júnior before finishing to the left of the net with an over-the-shoulder acrobatic right-footed kick. Casemiro hit the woodwork and Fred also had a shot saved with Brazil running out comfortable 2–0 winners.

24 November 2022
22:00

Brazil	2–0	Serbia
Richarlison 62', 73'

Lusail Stadium, Lusail
Attendance: 88,103
Referee: Alireza Faghani (Iran)

Brazil	Serbia

GK	1	Alisson
RB	2	Danilo
CB	4	Marquinhos
CB	3	Thiago Silva (c)
LB	6	Alex Sandro
CM	5	Casemiro
CM	7	Lucas Paquetá	(substituted off) 75'
RW	11	Raphinha	(substituted off) 87'
AM	10	Neymar	(substituted off) 79'
LW	20	Vinícius Júnior	(substituted off) 75'
CF	9	Richarlison	(substituted off) 79'
Substitutions
MF	8	Fred	(substituted on) 75'
FW	21	Rodrygo	(substituted on) 75'
FW	18	Gabriel Jesus	(substituted on) 79'
FW	19	Antony	(substituted on) 79'
FW	26	Gabriel Martinelli	(substituted on) 87'
Manager:
Tite

GK	23	Vanja Milinković-Savić
CB	5	Miloš Veljković
CB	4	Nikola Milenković
CB	2	Strahinja Pavlović	(yellow card) 7'
DM	8	Nemanja Gudelj	(yellow card) 49'	(substituted off) 57'
RM	14	Andrija Živković		(substituted off) 57'
CM	16	Saša Lukić	(yellow card) 64'	(substituted off) 66'
CM	20	Sergej Milinković-Savić
LM	25	Filip Mladenović		(substituted off) 66'
AM	10	Dušan Tadić (c)
CF	9	Aleksandar Mitrović		(substituted off) 83'
Substitutions
MF	24	Ivan Ilić		(substituted on) 57'
MF	7	Nemanja Radonjić		(substituted on) 57'
MF	22	Darko Lazović		(substituted on) 66'
FW	18	Dušan Vlahović		(substituted on) 66'
MF	6	Nemanja Maksimović		(substituted on) 83'
Manager:
Dragan Stojković

Man of the Match:
Richarlison (Brazil)

Assistant referees:
Mohammadreza Mansouri (Iran)
Mohammadreza Abolfazli (Iran)
Fourth official:
Maguette Ndiaye (Senegal)
Reserve assistant referee:
El Hadj Malick Samba (Senegal)
Video assistant referee:
Taleb Al-Marri (Qatar)
Assistant video assistant referees:
Muhammad Taqi (Singapore)
Anton Shchetinin (Australia)
Pol van Boekel (Netherlands)
Stand-by assistant video assistant referee:
Ashley Beecham (Australia)

=== Brazil vs Switzerland ===
The teams had met nine times prior, including two draws coming in World Cup group stage matches: 2–2 in 1950 and 1–1 in 2018.

Brazil started the game without the injured Neymar, who was ruled out for the remainder of the group stage after spraining his ankle in the previous match. The only goal of the game was scored by Brazilian midfielder Casemiro in the 83rd minute, when his deflected right-footed shot from inside the penalty area struck the top corner of the net.

The win secured Brazil's passage to the knockout stage, and was their first victory in three attempts against Switzerland at the FIFA World Cup.

28 November 2022
19:00

Brazil	1–0	Switzerland
Casemiro 83'

Stadium 974, Doha
Attendance: 43,649
Referee: Iván Barton (El Salvador)

Brazil	Switzerland

GK	1	Alisson
RB	14	Éder Militão
CB	4	Marquinhos
CB	3	Thiago Silva (c)
LB	6	Alex Sandro		(substituted off) 86'
DM	5	Casemiro
CM	8	Fred	(yellow card) 52'	(substituted off) 58'
CM	7	Lucas Paquetá		(substituted off) 46'
RF	11	Raphinha		(substituted off) 73'
CF	9	Richarlison		(substituted off) 73'
LF	20	Vinícius Júnior
Substitutions:
FW	21	Rodrygo		(substituted on) 46'
MF	17	Bruno Guimarães		(substituted on) 58'
FW	18	Gabriel Jesus		(substituted on) 73'
FW	19	Antony		(substituted on) 73'
DF	16	Alex Telles		(substituted on) 86'
Manager:
Tite

GK	1	Yann Sommer
RB	3	Silvan Widmer		(substituted off) 86'
CB	5	Manuel Akanji
CB	4	Nico Elvedi
LB	13	Ricardo Rodriguez
CM	8	Remo Freuler
CM	10	Granit Xhaka (c)
RW	25	Fabian Rieder	(yellow card) 50'	(substituted off) 58'
AM	15	Djibril Sow		(substituted off) 76'
LW	17	Ruben Vargas		(substituted off) 58'
CF	7	Breel Embolo		(substituted off) 76'
Substitutions:
DF	2	Edimilson Fernandes		(substituted on) 58'
DF	11	Renato Steffen		(substituted on) 58'
MF	14	Michel Aebischer		(substituted on) 76'
FW	9	Haris Seferovic		(substituted on) 76'
MF	20	Fabian Frei		(substituted on) 86'
Manager:
Murat Yakin

Man of the Match:
Casemiro (Brazil)

Assistant referees:
David Morán (El Salvador)
Zachari Zeegelaar (Suriname)
Fourth official:
Saíd Martínez (Honduras)
Reserve assistant referee:
Walter López (Honduras)
Video assistant referee:
Drew Fischer (Canada)
Assistant video assistant referees:
Armando Villarreal (United States)
Kathryn Nesbitt (United States)
Fernando Guerrero (Mexico)
Stand-by assistant video assistant referee:
Mahmoud Abouelregal (Egypt)

=== Cameroon vs Brazil ===
The teams had previously met six times, including in two World Cup group stage games, both won by Brazil: a 3–0 victory in 1994 and a 4–1 win in 2014.

Brazil, already assured a place in the knockout stage, made ten changes to their previous starting lineup. Despite the Brazilians having the majority of the game's chances, Cameroon would take the lead in second-half stoppage time, after Vincent Aboubakar ran into the penalty area to head the cross from Jerome Ngom Mbekeli on the right into the net's bottom corner from six yards out. Aboubakar celebrated the goal by removing his shirt, receiving a second yellow card and thus being sent off.

The match marked Brazil's first defeat in the group stage of a World Cup since losing to Norway in 1998. Despite their loss, Brazil clinched top spot in Group G on goal difference as they progressed to the knockout stage. Although they were still eliminated, Cameroon became the first African team to defeat Brazil at a World Cup, with this victory also being their first at the tournament since beating Saudi Arabia in 2002. This result also meant that no team finished the group stage of the World Cup with a perfect winning record for the first time since 1994.

2 December 2022
22:00

Cameroon	1–0	Brazil
Aboubakar 90+2'

Lusail Stadium, Lusail
Attendance: 85,986
Referee: Ismail Elfath (United States)

Cameroon	Brazil

GK	16	Devis Epassy
RB	19	Collins Fai	(yellow card) 32'
CB	4	Christopher Wooh
CB	24	Enzo Ebosse
LB	25	Nouhou Tolo	(yellow card) 6'
CM	8	André-Frank Zambo Anguissa
CM	15	Pierre Kunde	(yellow card) 28'	(substituted off) 68'
RW	20	Bryan Mbeumo		(substituted off) 64'
AM	13	Eric Maxim Choupo-Moting
LW	6	Moumi Ngamaleu		(substituted off) 86'
CF	10	Vincent Aboubakar (c)	(yellow card) 81' (yellow-red card) 90+3'
Substitutions:
FW	12	Karl Toko Ekambi		(substituted on) 64'
MF	22	Olivier Ntcham		(substituted on) 68'
DF	2	Jerome Ngom Mbekeli		(substituted on) 86'
Manager:
Rigobert Song

GK	23	Ederson
RB	13	Dani Alves (c)
CB	14	Éder Militão	(yellow card) 7'
CB	24	Bremer
LB	16	Alex Telles		(substituted off) 54'
CM	15	Fabinho
CM	8	Fred		(substituted off) 54'
RW	19	Antony		(substituted off) 79'
AM	21	Rodrygo		(substituted off) 54'
LW	26	Gabriel Martinelli
CF	18	Gabriel Jesus		(substituted off) 64'
Substitutions:
DF	4	Marquinhos		(substituted on) 54'
MF	22	Éverton Ribeiro		(substituted on) 54'
MF	17	Bruno Guimarães	(yellow card) 85'	(substituted on) 54'
FW	25	Pedro		(substituted on) 64'
FW	11	Raphinha		(substituted on) 79'
Manager:
Tite

Man of the Match:
Devis Epassy (Cameroon)

Assistant referees:
Kyle Atkins (United States)
Corey Parker (United States)
Fourth official:
Ma Ning (China)
Reserve assistant referee:
Shi Xiang (China)
Video assistant referee:
Alejandro Hernández (Spain)
Assistant video assistant referees:
Juan Martinez (Spain)
Pau Cebrián Devís (Spain)
Ricardo de Burgos Bengoetxea (Spain)
Stand-by assistant video assistant referee:
Roberto Díaz Pérez del Palomar (Spain)

== Knockout stage ==
=== Brazil vs South Korea ===
The teams had previously met seven times, with Brazil winning six and South Korea winning one of these encounters. The most recent meeting was in June 2022, a 5–1 friendly win for Brazil.

Vinícius Júnior opened the scoring for Brazil in the 7th minute, when he converted a side-footed shot to the right of the net past three Korean defenders on the line. Brazil were awarded a penalty six minutes later when Richarlison was fouled just inside the penalty area, which the returning Neymar scored with a low shot to the right corner of the goalkeeper, who didn't move. Richarlison made it 3–0 in the 29th minute when he controlled the ball with his head before receiving the ball back from Thiago Silva and passing into the left corner of the net. Lucas Paquetá got Brazil's fourth goal before half-time in the 36th minute, volleying low into the left corner of the net with his right foot after a cross from Vinícius Júnior on the left. In the second half, South Korea pulled a goal back when Paik Seung-ho finished into the right of the net from thirty yards out. With ten minutes left and leading by three goals, Brazilian goalkeeper Alisson was substituted for third-choice keeper Weverton, making Brazil the first team to ever play 26 different players in a single World Cup.

5 December 2022
22:00

Brazil	4–1	South Korea
Vinícius 7'; Neymar 13' (pen.); Richarlison 29'; Paquetá 36'		Paik Seung-ho 76'

Stadium 974, Doha
Attendance: 43,847
Referee: Clément Turpin (France)

Brazil	South Korea

GK	1	Alisson	(substituted off) 80'
RB	14	Éder Militão	(substituted off) 63'
CB	4	Marquinhos
CB	3	Thiago Silva (c)
LB	2	Danilo	(substituted off) 72'
CM	5	Casemiro
CM	7	Lucas Paquetá
RW	11	Raphinha
AM	10	Neymar	(substituted off) 80'
LW	20	Vinícius Júnior	(substituted off) 72'
CF	9	Richarlison
Substitutions:
DF	13	Dani Alves	(substituted on) 63'
FW	26	Gabriel Martinelli	(substituted on) 72'
DF	24	Bremer	(substituted on) 72'
GK	12	Weverton	(substituted on) 80'
FW	21	Rodrygo	(substituted on) 80'
Manager:
Tite

GK	1	Kim Seung-gyu
RB	15	Kim Moon-hwan
CB	4	Kim Min-jae
CB	19	Kim Young-gwon
LB	3	Kim Jin-su		(substituted off) 46'
RM	10	Lee Jae-sung		(substituted off) 74'
CM	5	Jung Woo-young	(yellow card) 44'	(substituted off) 46'
CM	6	Hwang In-beom		(substituted off) 65'
LM	11	Hwang Hee-chan
CF	9	Cho Gue-sung		(substituted off) 80'
CF	7	Son Heung-min (c)
Substitutions:
DF	14	Hong Chul		(substituted on) 46'
MF	13	Son Jun-ho		(substituted on) 46'
MF	8	Paik Seung-ho		(substituted on) 65'
MF	18	Lee Kang-in		(substituted on) 74'
FW	16	Hwang Ui-jo		(substituted on) 80'
Manager:
(Portugal) Paulo Bento

Man of the Match:
Neymar (Brazil)

Assistant referees:
Nicolas Danos (France)
Cyril Gringore (France)
Fourth official:
Slavko Vinčić (Slovenia)
Reserve assistant referee:
Tomaž Klančnik (Slovenia)
Video assistant referee:
Jérôme Brisard (France)

=== Croatia vs Brazil ===
The teams had met on four previous occasions, with three wins for Brazil and one draw. Two of these encounters took place in the World Cup group stage, with Brazil winning both matches: 1–0 in 2006 and 3–1 in 2014.

Brazil created the majority of the game's chances, forcing Croatian keeper Dominik Livaković into eleven saves, the most in a single match at the tournament. Early in the second half, a handball in the Croatian penalty area by Croatian defender Josip Juranović was dismissed by the referee after being deemed accidental. Following a scoreless ninety minutes, Neymar finally claimed the opener just before half-time of extra time with his 77th international goal, bringing him level with Péle as the nation's all-time top scorer; after receiving the ball back from Lucas Paquetá, Neymar rounded Livaković and shot high into the net from the right side of the penalty area. A defensive lapse then cost Brazil their lead, as Bruno Petković equalised for Croatia three minutes from the end; after picking out Mislav Oršić's cross on the left flank, he fired a shot into the corner of the net that took a deflection off the leg of Brazilian defender Marquinhos. This would be Croatia's only shot on target of the game. In the subsequent penalty shoot-out, Croatia scored all four of their attempts, while Brazil's first kicker Rodrygo had his shot saved by Livaković diving to his left, before Marquinhos hit his penalty low against the left post to confirm Brazil's elimination.

Croatia qualified for their second successive World Cup semi-finals and their third ever, while Brazil exited the tournament at the hands of a European team for the fifth consecutive edition; their 2002 World Cup final triumph against Germany remained their last knockout stage win against European opposition. In the same period, Brazil was eliminated at the quarter-finals in all four World Cup tournaments they played away from home, thus excluding a fourth-place finish at the 2014 tournament which they hosted.

9 December 2022
18:00

Croatia	1–1 (a.e.t.)	Brazil
Petković 117'		Neymar 105+1'
Penalties
Vlašić (penalty scored); Majer (penalty scored); Modrić (penalty scored); Oršić (penalty scored)	4–2	(penalty missed) Rodrygo; (penalty scored) Casemiro; (penalty scored) Pedro; (penalty missed) Marquinhos

Education City Stadium, Al Rayyan
Attendance: 43,893
Referee: Michael Oliver (England)

Croatia	Brazil

GK	1	Dominik Livaković
RB	22	Josip Juranović
CB	6	Dejan Lovren
CB	20	Joško Gvardiol
LB	19	Borna Sosa		(substituted off) 110'
DM	11	Marcelo Brozović	(yellow card) 31'	(substituted off) 114'
CM	10	Luka Modrić (c)
CM	8	Mateo Kovačić		(substituted off) 106'
RF	15	Mario Pašalić		(substituted off) 72'
CF	9	Andrej Kramarić		(substituted off) 72'
LF	4	Ivan Perišić
Substitutions:
FW	16	Bruno Petković	(yellow card) 117'	(substituted on) 72'
MF	13	Nikola Vlašić		(substituted on) 72'
MF	7	Lovro Majer		(substituted on) 106'
FW	17	Ante Budimir		(substituted on) 110'
FW	18	Mislav Oršić		(substituted on) 114'
Manager:
Zlatko Dalić

GK	1	Alisson
RB	14	Éder Militão		(substituted off) 106'
CB	4	Marquinhos	(yellow card) 77'
CB	3	Thiago Silva (c)
LB	2	Danilo	(yellow card) 25'
CM	7	Lucas Paquetá		(substituted off) 106'
CM	5	Casemiro	(yellow card) 68'
RW	11	Raphinha		(substituted off) 56'
AM	10	Neymar
LW	20	Vinícius Júnior		(substituted off) 64'
CF	9	Richarlison		(substituted off) 84'
Substitutions:
FW	19	Antony		(substituted on) 56'
FW	21	Rodrygo		(substituted on) 64'
FW	25	Pedro		(substituted on) 84'
DF	6	Alex Sandro		(substituted on) 106'
MF	8	Fred		(substituted on) 106'
Manager:
Tite

Man of the Match:
Dominik Livaković (Croatia)

Assistant referees:
Stuart Burt (England)
Gary Beswick (England)
Fourth official:
Mustapha Ghorbal (Algeria)
Reserve assistant referee:
Abdelhak Etchiali (Algeria)
Video assistant referee:
Pol van Boekel (Netherlands)
