= Marco Parrino =

Italian businessman and writer (born 1995)

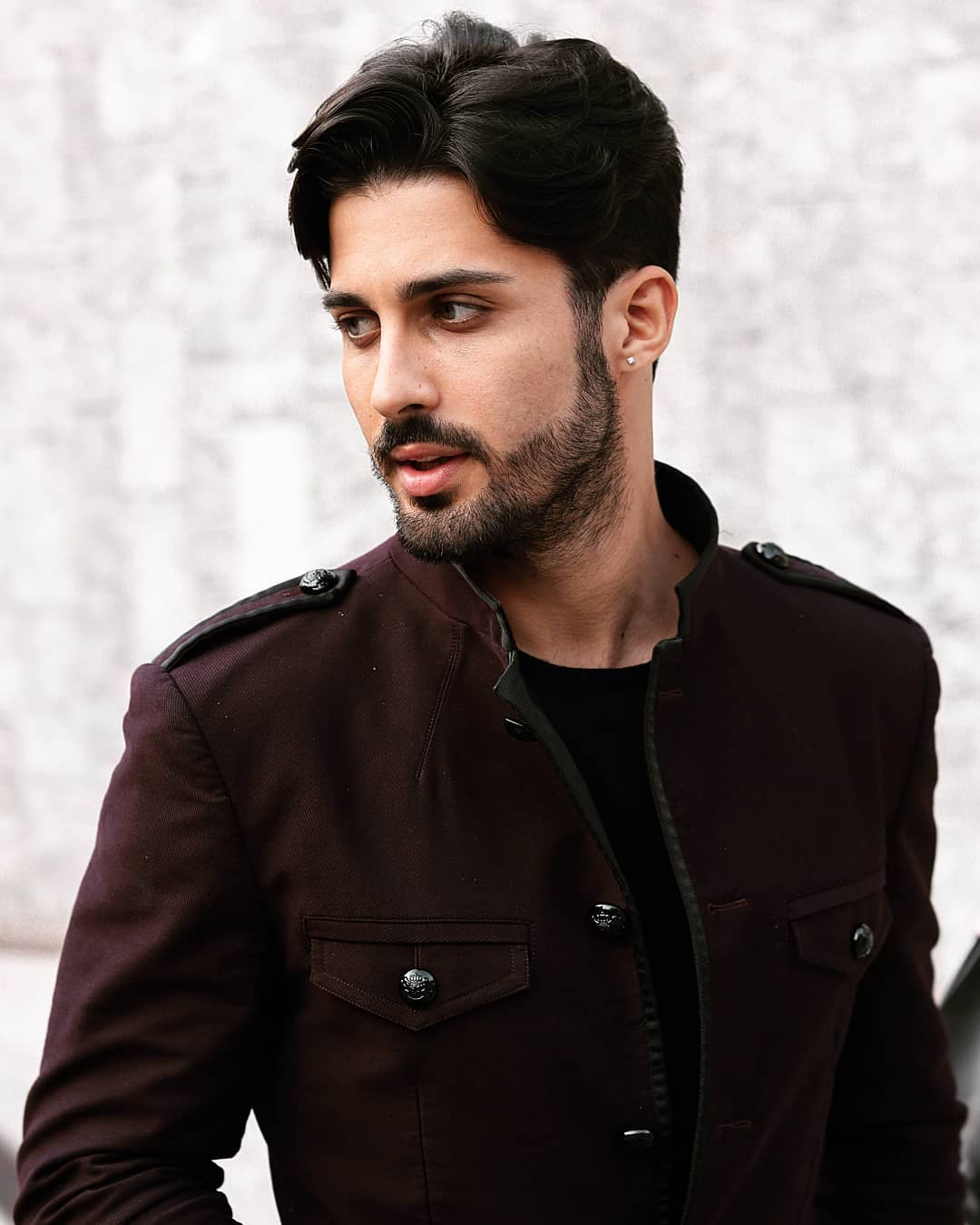
- Born: April 18, 1995 (age 31); Alcamo, Italy
- Education: University of Bologna; Bocconi University
- Occupations: Businessman and writer
- Known for: Sicilia è amore
- Website: Official Website

Marco Parrino (born on April 18, 1995, in Alcamo) is an Italian businessman and writer. He is best known for Sicilia è amore, an editorial co-creation project for the promotion of Sicily, the income of which is donated to charity.

== Early life and education ==
Marco Parrino was born in Alcamo, Italy. He was graduated from the University of Bologna in Economics and did his Masters in Marketing Management from the Bocconi University in Milan. After his studies, he worked for various brands as a consultant in the high fashion industry, participating in various international events and to the creation of digital and editorial contents.

== Career ==
Since 2016, he has participated in several international fashion events including Pitti Uomo in Florence and in fashion week that were organized in Milan, London, Dubai and Istanbul. During his participation in these events, he collaborated with different brands such as Kia, John Varvatos (company), Hilton Worldwide, Rocco Forte Hotels, US POLO ASS etc. developing digital content for protmotion. Marco has been the official guest of many international events such as Mercedes Benz Fashion Week held in Istanbul and Arab Fashion Week held in Dubai.

In 2021, he published the book "Sicilia è amore", a volume that collects more than 400 locations that depict the nature, culture and history of Sicily. There's a description for each place accompanied by photos and a QR Code that refers to the exact geographical position. The proceeds from the book are donated to a charity named "Plastic Free Odv Onlus" in order to fight against pollution caused by plastics.
