= European Rover Challenge =

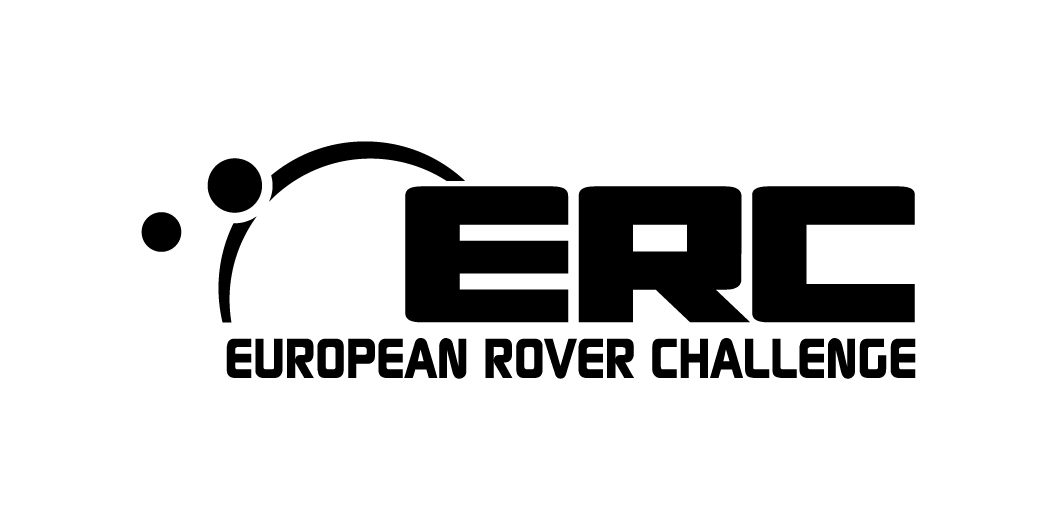
European Rover Challenge Logo

European Rover Challenge (ERC, ERC Space & Robotics) is an annual Martian robot competition held in Poland. It began in 2014 at the Regional Science and Technology Centre in Chęciny, and until 2023 has been held in Jasionka, Starachowice, and Kielce. Since 2024, the competition has been held at the AGH University of Krakow.

The ERC is the largest robotics and space event in Europe. It is addressed towards scientists, businesspersons, the technology sector and the general public. Along with the University Rover Challenge, the ERC is a part of the Rover Challenge Series.

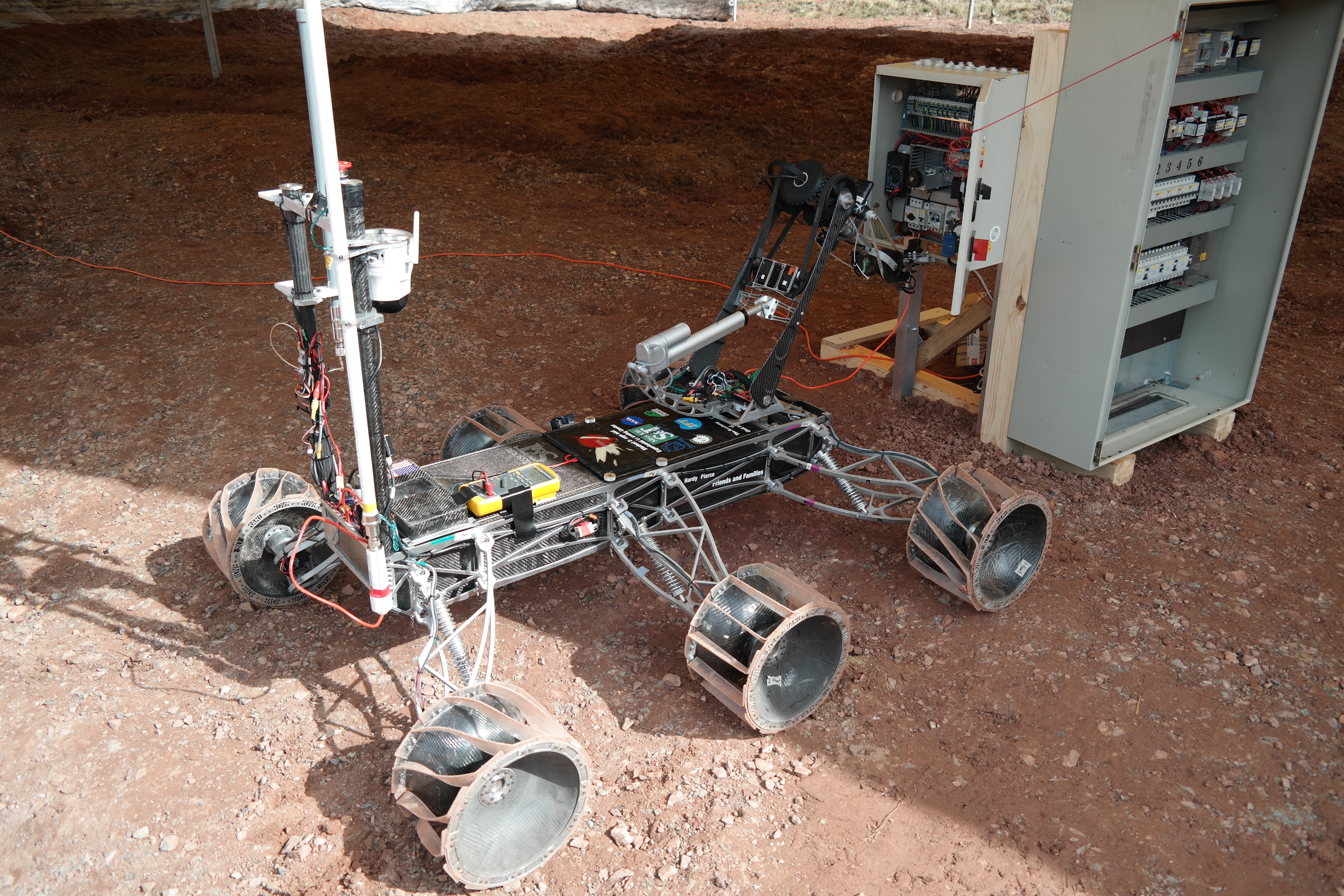
A Martian rover performing one of the tasks

== History ==
Prior to 2020, all robots and their operators attended the competition on-site. In 2020, the competition switched to a "remote" formula, in which competitors from several continents remotely controlled a robot located on the Mars yard on the campus of the Kielce University of Technology in Poland. When on-site participation resumed in 2021, this remote competing method was retained.

=== Competition tasks (ON-SITE) ===
GPS is not allowed to be used by the robots (unlike other competitions of this kind) and team members do not see the robots they are navigating. Therefore, they must rely on the robot's other sensors (such as its camera) to complete the competition's tasks.

== Competition history ==
The European Rover Challenge has been organized since 2014. The plans to organize the first edition were announced at the International Space Week.

=== 1st edition (5–7 September 2014) ===
The first edition of the ERC took place at the Regional Science and Technology Centre in Chęciny near Kielce, Świętokrzyskie Voivodeship. The competition was attended by nine teams from Poland, Lithuania, India, Egypt, and Colombia. Among the guests, were Professor Scott Hubbard, former head of NASA's Ames Research Centre, and Robert Zubrin, founder of the Mars Society.

Winners:

- 1st place: SCORPIO, Wrocław, Poland
- 2nd place: IMPULS, Kielce, Poland
- 3rd place: Lunar and Mars Rover Team, Cairo, Egypt

During the event the Regional Science and Technology Centre, where the competition took place, officially opened.

=== 2nd edition (4–6 September 2015) ===
The second edition of the ERC also took place at the Regional Science and Technology Centre. The competition was attended by 29 teams from the US, Australia, India, Colombia, the Netherlands, Egypt, Poland, Canada, and other countries. Specials guests of the second edition included astronaut Harrison Schmitt (member of Apollo 17) and writer Andy Weir remotely.

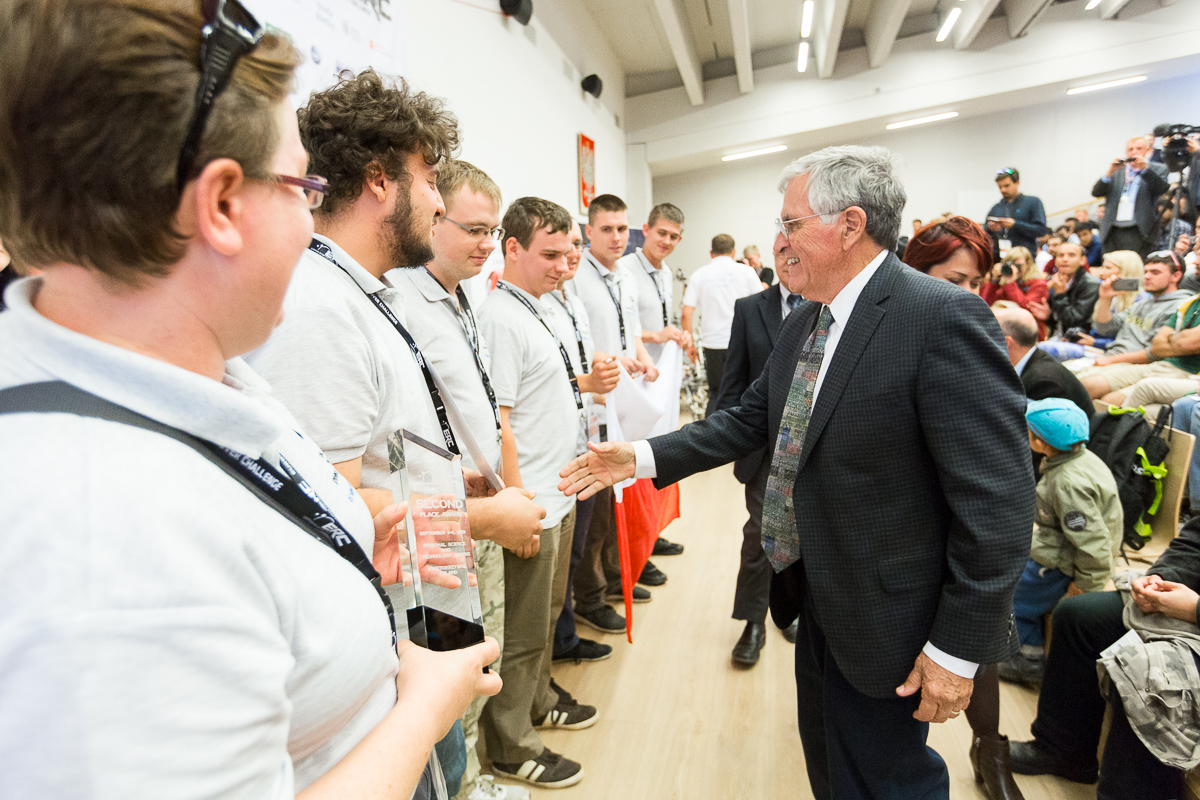
Apollo 17 astronaut Harrison Schmitt at the ERC2015

Winners:

- 1st place: USST, Canada
- 2nd place: Next, Białystok, Poland
- 3rd place: McGill Robotics, Canada

=== 3rd edition (10–12 September 2016) ===
An important event during the ERC 2016 was a Polish part of a civil debate on the future of space exploration organized by the European Space Agency. The debate took place in 22 countries at the same time and was attended by 2,000 people who were not involved with the space sector. They discussed such subjects as space exploration, using its resources, and the growing importance of space. Its objective was to verify public opinion and the results were to be considered while developing future strategies of ESA.

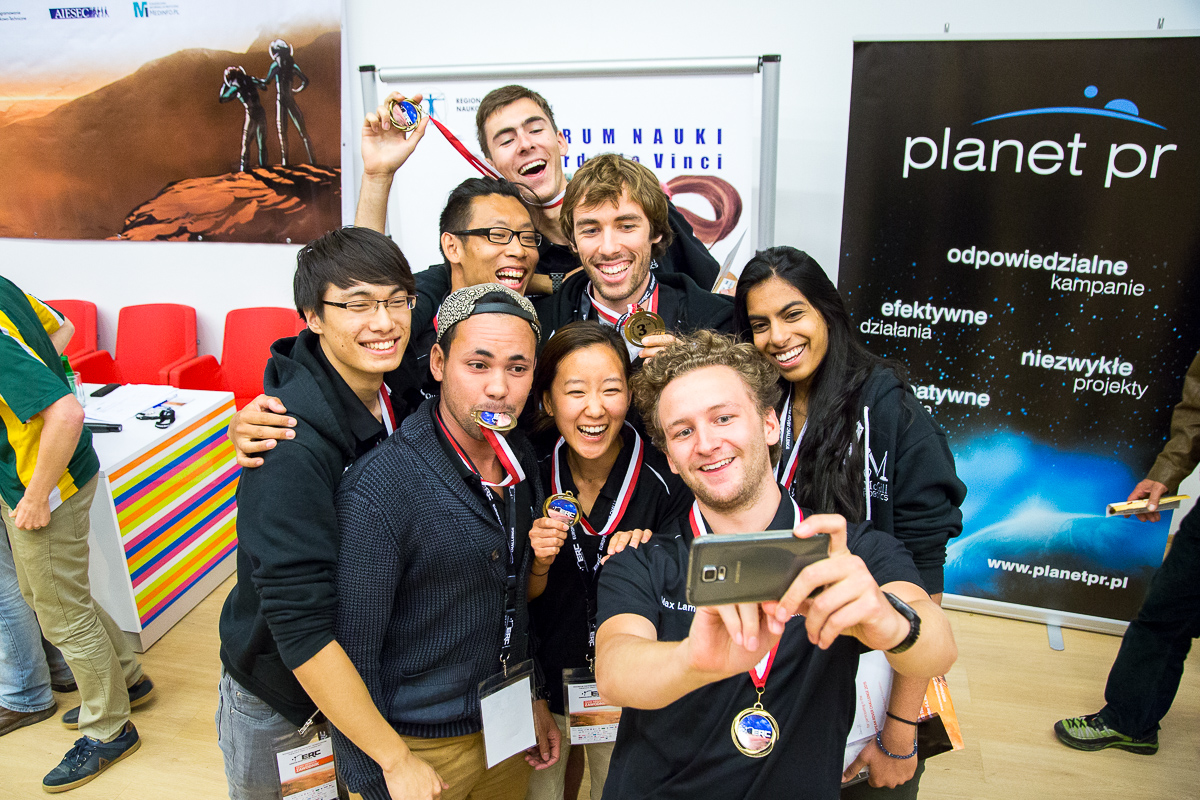
Competitors of the ERC2015

Winners:

- 1st place: Raptors, Poland
- 2nd place: Impuls, Poland
- 3rd place: McGill Robotics, Canada

=== 4th edition (14–15 September 2018) ===
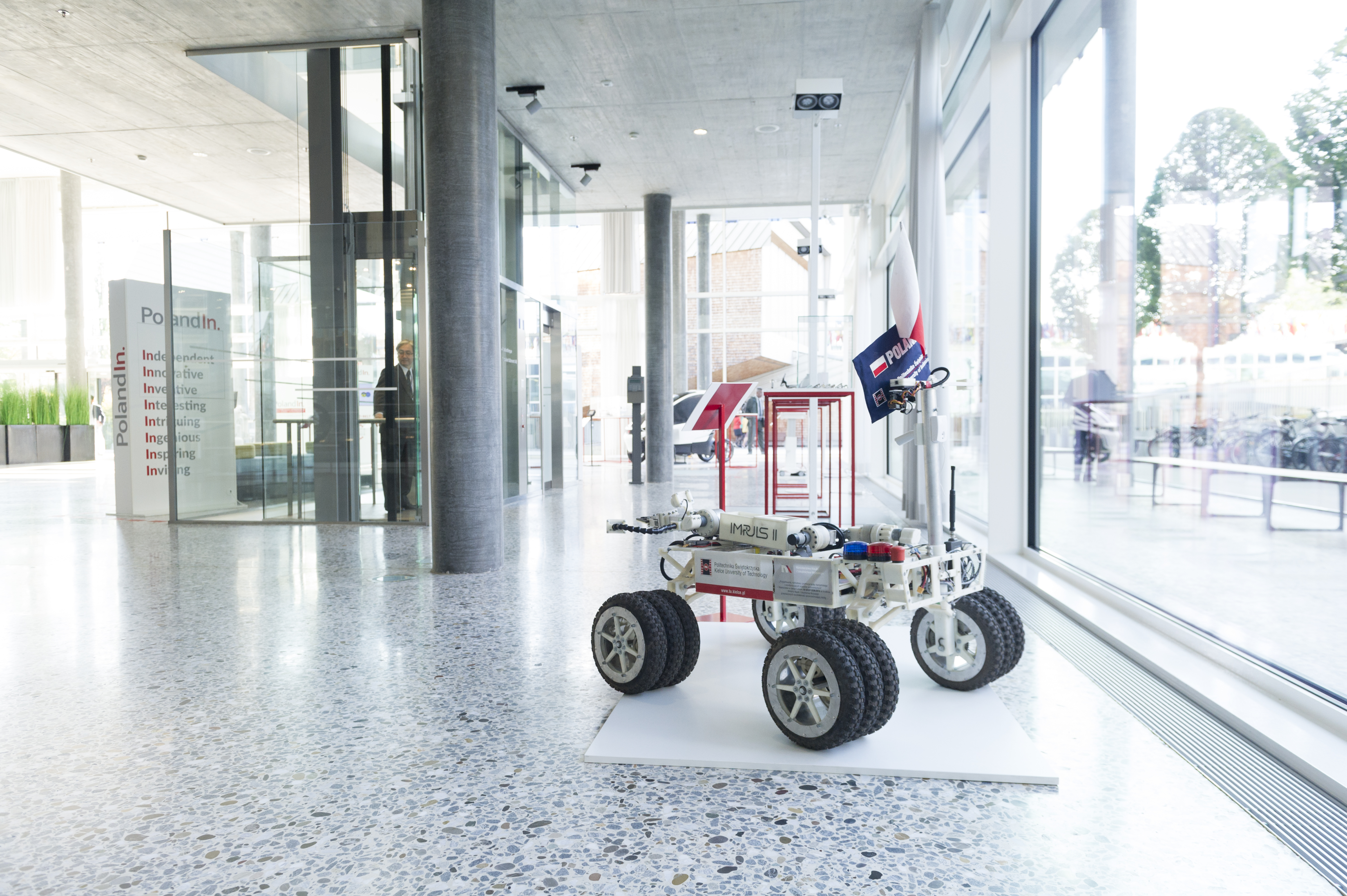
4th edition 1st-place winner, Impuls from Poland

The fourth edition of the European Rover Challenge was organized in Starachowice, Świętokrzyskie Voivodeship, at the Museum of Nature and Technology. The competition was attended by 35 teams from 20 countries. The fourth edition of the challenge was accompanied by the biggest Science and Technology Show Zone in history. It attracted over 25,000 visitors. Among the guests, there was astronaut Tim Peake, Artemis Westenberg – President of Explore Mars Europe, Gianfranco Visentin, Head of Automation and Robotics Section at ESA, and Maria Antonietta Perino, Head of Advanced Exploration Programmes at Thales Alenia Space.

It was the first time when Pro Formula had been organized along with the competition. It was addressed to professionals from the space sector and constructors of space robots who wanted to test their constructions in the Mars Yard without participating in the challenge.

Winners:

- 1st place: Impuls, Poland
- 2nd place: Raptors, Poland
- 3rd place: Robotics for Space Exploration, Canada
- Jury Award: RoverOva, Czech Republic

=== 5th edition (13–15 September 2019) ===
The ERC 2019 took place at the Kielce University of Technology with over 40 teams qualified for the competition.

The fifth edition of the challenge was accompanied by the Mentoring and Business Conference attended by representatives of the space sector from Poland, Europe and the whole world, including Steve Jurczyk, Associate Administrator at NASA, Maria Antonietta Perino from Thales Alenia Space, Gianfranco Visentin and Pantelis Poulakis from ESA and Artemis Westenberg from Explore Mars Europe.

Winners:

- 1st place: Impuls, Poland
- 2nd place: AGH Space Systems, Poland
- 3rd place: RoverOva, Czech Republic

=== 6th edition (11–13 September 2020) ===
The sixth edition of the ERC was held at the Kielce University of Technology. Over 60 teams from all over the world applied to participate in the competition. The 2020 edition was the first one to introduce the remote formula. The competition was conducted using the Freedom Robotics platform and Leo Rover mobile robots. A total of 33 teams qualified for the finals.

Winners:

- 1st place: ERIG e.V., Germany
- 2nd place: RoverOva, Czech Republic
- 3rd place (ex aequo): DJS Antariksh, India, and Robocol, Colombia

Additional awards:

- Best Design Award: Best Design: AGH Space Systems, Poland
- Best Design Award: Best Docs: STAR Dresden e.V., Germany
- Best Design Award: Best Science Design: ERIG e.V., Germany
- Best Autonomy Navigation: RoverOva, Czech Republic
- Best Scientists: METU Rover, Turkey
- Best Science Planning: DJS Antariksh, India
- Best Planetary Map: Robocol, Colombia
- Best Analysis: RoverOva, Czech Republic
- Best Dexterity: RoboClyde, UK
- Best Presentation: AGH Space Systems, Poland
- Mathworks Special Prize: SKA Robotics, Poland

The 2020 edition was the first to be broadcast live on the organizer's website during the three days of the event. The guests of the ERC2020 industry conference were, among others:

- Natalia Lemarquis – United Nations Office for Outer Space Affairs Space4Women;
- Giuliana Rotola – European Southern Observatory; International Space University;
- Maria-Gabriella Sarah – European Space Agency;
- Gianfranco Visentin – European Space Agency;
- Douglas Terrier – National Aeronautics and Space Administration;
- Pascale Ehrenfreund – International Astronautical Federation; Space Policy Institute;
- Ken Davidian – Federal Aviation Administration.

=== 7th edition (10–12 September 2021) ===
The seventh edition of the ERC was held at the Kielce University of Technology. The 2021 edition was the first to be held in both on-site and remote formulas.

Winners:

- 1st place (on-site): Impuls Team, Poland
- 2nd place (on-site): ITU Rover Team, Turkey
- 3rd place (on-site): EPFL Xplore, Switzerland
- 1st place (remote): DJS Antariksh, India
- 2nd place (remote): ERIG, Germany
- 3rd place (remote): RoboClyde, UK

Additional awards:

- Best Navigation (on-site): AGH Space Systems, Poland
- Best Maintenance (on-site): ITU Rover Team, Turkey
- Best Science (on-site): EPFL Xplore, Switzerland
- Best Probing (on-site): EPFL Xplore, Switzerland
- Best Presentation (on-site): AGH Space Systems, Poland
- Best Navigation (remote): DJS Antariksh, India
- Best Maintenance (remote): ERIG, Germany
- Best Science (remote): DJS Antariksh, India
- Best Presentation (remote): Mars Rover Manipal, India

Selected speakers that appeared during the ERC 2021 live broadcast:

- Robert D. Cabana – NASA Associate Administrator;
- Robert Zubrin – Mars Society, Pioneer Astronautics;
- Annalisa Donati – EURISY;
- Chris Welch – International Space University;
- Maria Antonietta Perino – Thales Alenia Space;
- Grzegorz Wrochna – Polska Agencja Kosmiczna;
- Artemis Westenberg – Explore Mars Europe.

=== 8th edition (9-11 September 2022) ===
The eighth edition of the ERC was held at the Kielce University of Technology. Similar to the previous year's edition, the ERC 2022 was held in both on-site and remote formulas.

Winners:

- 1st place (on-site): AGH Space Systems, Poland
- 2nd place (on-site): EPFL Xplore, Switzerland
- 3rd place (on-site): ITU Rover Team, Turkey
- 1st place (remote): DJS Antariksh, India
- 2nd place (remote): Mars Rover Manipal, India
- 3rd place (remote): Project RED, Italy

Additional awards:

- Best Performance NAVIGATION (on-site): EPFL Xplore, Switzerland
- Best Performance NAVIGATION (remote): IIT Bombay Mars Rover Team, India
- Best Performance MAINTENANCE (on-site): Frankfurt Robotics Science Team (FROST), Germany
- Best Performance MAINTENANCE (remote): Mars Rover Manipal, India
- Best Performance SCIENCE (on-site): ERIG, Germany
- Best Performance SCIENCE (remote): Mars Rover Manipal, India
- Best Performance PROBING: STAR Dresden, Germany
- Best Performance PRESENTATION (on-site): ITU Rover Team, Turkey
- Best Performance PRESENTATION (remote): Mars Rover Manipal, India

=== 9th edition (15–17 September 2023) ===
The 9th Edition of the ERC was held at the Kielce University of Technology. Similar to the two previous year's editions, the ERC 2023 was held in both on-site and remote formulas.

Winners:

- 1st place (on-site): AGH Space Systems, Poland
- 2nd place (on-site): FHNW Rover Team, Switzerland
- 3rd place (on-site): EPFL Xplore, Switzerland
- 1st place (remote): Makercie, Netherlands
- 2nd place (remote): DJS Antariksh, India
- 3rd place (remote): Project RED, Italy

Additional awards:

- Best Performance NAVIGATION (on-site): AGH Space Systems, Poland
- Best Performance NAVIGATION (remote): Project RED, Italy
- Best Performance MAINTENANCE (on-site): EPFL Xplore, Switzerland
- Best Performance MAINTENANCE (remote): CRISS Robotics, India
- Best Performance SCIENCE (on-site): Beyond Robotics, Greece
- Best Performance COLLECTION & PROBING: FHNW Rover Team, Switzerland
- Best Performance PRESENTATION (on-site): Imperial Planetary Robotics Lab, UK
- Best Performance PRESENTATION (remote): Makercie, Netherlands

=== 10th edition (6–8 September 2024) ===
The 10th anniversary edition of the ERC was held at the AGH University of Krakow. Unlike the previous years, the ERC was held only on-site with no competition planned for the remote one.

- 1st place (on-site): FHNW Rover Team, Switzerland
- 2nd place (on-site): AGH Space Systems, Poland
- 3rd place (on-site): ITU Rover Team, Turkey

Additional awards:

- Best Performance Maintenance: FHNW Rover Team, Switzerland
- Best Performance Science: Deep Sampling: FHNW Rover Team, Switzerland
- Best Performance Science: Surface Sampling: FHNW Rover Team, Switzerland
- Best Performance Science: Construction: FHNW Rover Team, Switzerland
- Best Performance Science: Exploration: BEARS Berlin, Germany
- Best Performance Presentation: EPFL Xplore, Switzerland
- Best Performance Probing: STAR Dresden, Germany
- Best Performance Droning: BEARS Berlin, Germany
- Best Performance Navigation: AGH Space Systems, Poland

=== 11th edition (29–31 August 2025) ===
The 11th edition of the ERC was held at the AGH University of Krakow. It marked the second consecutive year a Swiss team won the competition, and the first time that a local team did not win in two years. This edition reintroduced the remote formula for teams that did not wish to travel to Poland.

Winners:

- 1st place (on-site): EPFL Xplore, Switzerland
- 2nd place (on-site): STAR Dresden e.V., Germany
- 3rd place (on-site): AGH Space Systems, Poland
- 1st place (remote): Sapienza Technology Team, Italy
- 2nd place (remote): IITB Mars Rover Team, India
- 3rd place (remote): CRISS Robotics, India

Additional awards:

- Best Performance Maintenance: FRoST, Germany
- Best Performance Science: Sampling: STAR Dresden e.V., Germany
- Best Performance Science: AstroBio: Orion Team, Poland
- Best Performance Science: Exploration: STAR Dresden e.V., Germany
- Best Performance Presentation: Beyond Robotics, Greece
- Best Performance Probing: KNR Rover Team, Poland
- Best Performance Droning: EPFL Xplore, Switzerland
- Best Performance Navigation: AGH Space Systems, Poland

=== 12th edition (4–6 September 2026) ===
The 12th edition of the ERC was again held at the AGH University of Krakow for the third year in a row. Once again, a Swiss team won the competition, and the second time that a team was able to defend its title. This edition introduced the bonus creativity task conducted by Honda Research Institute for teams to showcase their innovation in developing planetary rovers.

Winners:

- 1st place: EPFL Xplore, Switzerland
- 2nd place: AGH Space Systems, Poland
- 3rd place: DIANA, Italy

Additional awards:

- Best Performance Science - Scientific Exploration: DJS Antariksh, India
- Best Performance Science - Astro-Bio: Brno Mars Rover, Czechia
- Best Performance Science - Sampling: DIANA, Italy
- Best Performance Navigation - Traverse: CRATER, Switzerland
- Best Performance Navigation - Droning: EPFL Xplore, Switzerland
- Best Performance Maintenance: DIANA, Italy
- Best Performance Probing: ARES Project, Japan
- Best Performance Presentation: ARES Project, Japan

== Bibliography ==
- Wilczyński, Łukasz. "European Rover Challenge". planetpr.pl.
- Nowakowski, Tomasz. "Canada dominates European Rover Challenge". Science X network.
- Sloan, Kevin. "2016 European Rover Challenge Kicks Off". marssociety.org. Archived from the original on 2016-03-08.
- Czapski, Michal (13 September 2015). "European Rover Challenge 2015 – the biggest open air space event in Europe". oewf.org.
