= Solano Trindade =

Brazilian poet, actor, folklorist, painter, stage director and activist

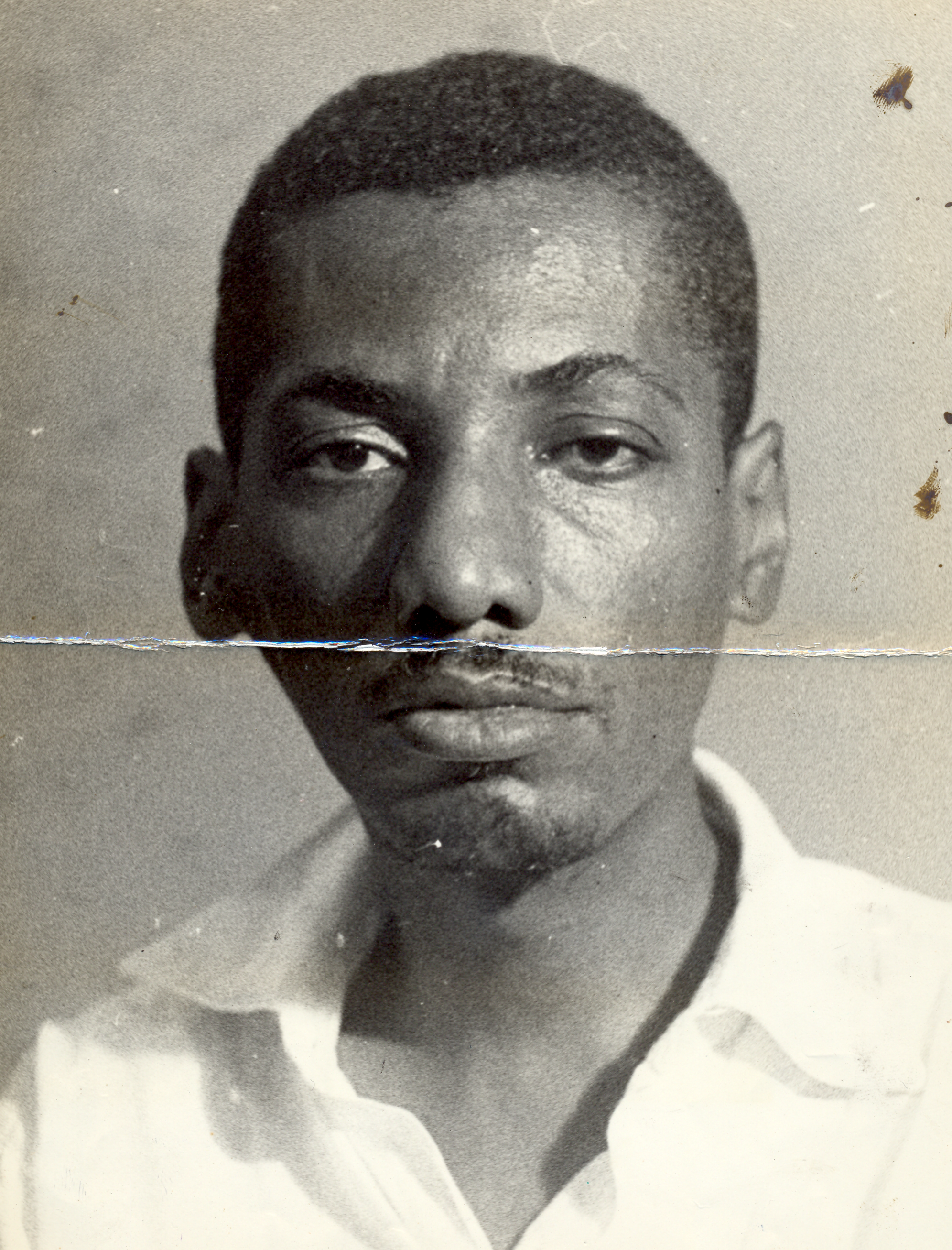
- Born: July 24, 1908; Recife, Pernambuco, Brazil
- Died: February 19, 1974 (aged 65); Rio de Janeiro
- Occupation(s): poet, actor, playwright, activist, painter

Solano Trindade (July 24, 1908— February 19, 1974) was a Brazilian poet, actor, folklorist, painter, stage director and activist. Trindade was active in the Brazilian Black Movement, having founded or co-founded several popular theater and art initiatives, such as the Teatro Popular Brasileiro (Brazilian Popular Theater) company.

His poems celebrated his Afro-Brazilian heritage, as well as denouncing racism, poverty and social inequality.

== Biography ==
Trindade was born in Recife. His father, Manuel Abílio Trindade, was a shoemaker who participated in the bumba-meu-boi and pastoril folk dances; his mother, Emerenciana Maria de Jesus Trindade, was a street food seller and factory worker.

Trindade worked for a time as a Presbyterian deacon. In 1934 he participated in the first Afro-Brazilian Congress, held in Recife, and two years later, of the second one, held in Salvador, Bahia. He published his first book in 1936, Poemas Negros. That year he founded two Afro-Brazilian cultural organizations: the Frente Negra Pernambucana (Black Front of Pernambuco) and the Centro Cultural Afro-Brasileiro (Afro-Brazilian Cultural Center).

After a brief stay in Belo Horizonte and Pelotas, Trindade moved to Rio de Janeiro in the 1940s. There he met other artists and intellectuals, reuniting at the Café Vermelhinho. He joined the Brazilian Communist Party. In 1944 he published the book Poemas para uma vida mais simples (Poems for a simpler life). In 1945 he organized, with Abdias do Nascimento, the Comitê Democrático Afro-brasileiro (Afro-Brazilian Democratic Committee), associated with Nascimento's Teatro Experimental do Negro.

In 1950, together with his wife Margarida Trindade and sociologist Edison Carneiro, he founded the Teatro Popular Brasileiro (TPB), a popular theater group inspired by Brazilian Black and indigenous cultural traditions. Trindade later moved to São Paulo, establishing a second branch to TPB and in 1961, he moved to the city of Embu, in Greater São Paulo, organizing several popular art ensembles. This included works with the renowned ceramist-sculptor Tadakiyo Sakai.

His daughter, Raquel Trindade, was also an activist, artist, and folklorist.

Trindade acted in several films, such as A Hora e Vez de Augusto Matraga by Roberto Santos.

Trindade died in Rio de Janeiro, in 1974.

== Books ==
- Poemas de Uma Vida Simples, Rio de Janeiro, 1944,
- Cantares ao Meu Povo, São Paulo, 1963.
- Poemas antológicos
