= Maria Antonietta Perino =

Italian aerospace engineer

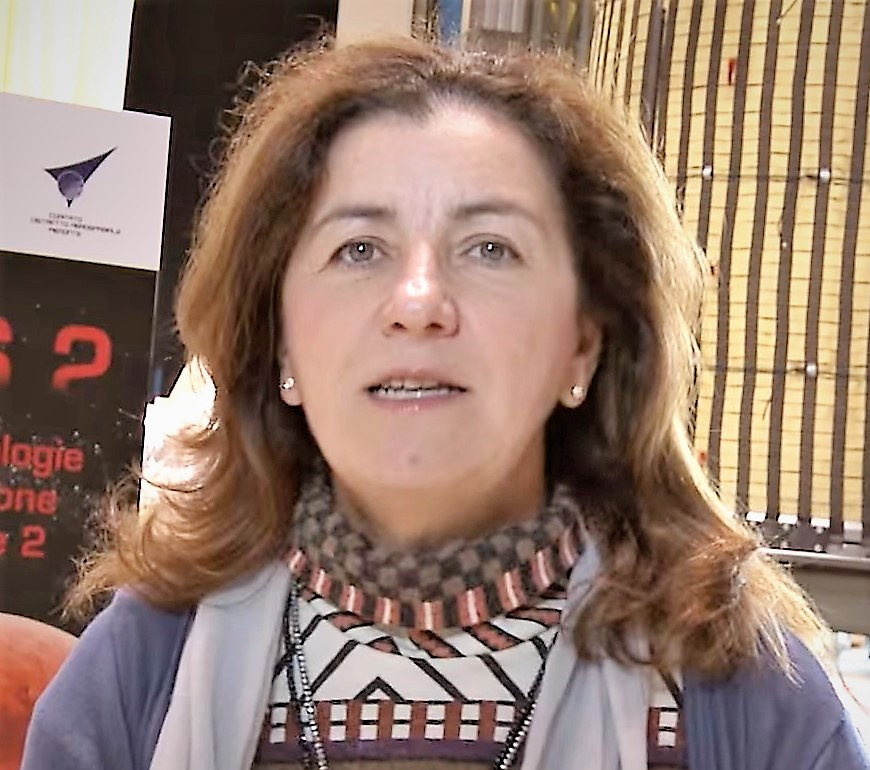
- Perino in 2015
- Education: Polytechnic University of Turin
- Scientific career
- Workplaces: European Space Agency; Thales Alenia Space

Maria Antonietta Perino is an Italian engineer who is Director for Space Economy Exploration and International Network at the Thales Alenia Space. She has previously served as Director for Advanced Exploration Programs, in which capacity she oversaw the ExoMars research programme. In 2019, she was awarded the Stella al Merito del Lavoro by the President of Italy.

== Early life and education ==
Perino is from Italy. She attended the Polytechnic University of Turin, where she majored in nuclear engineering. Perino took part in the first International Space University summer school, and was appointed to the faculty soon after.

== Career ==
In 1986, Perino joined the Thales Alenia Space, where she was responsible for Italian Space Agency and European Space Agency research missions including ExoMars and the Mars sample-return. She investigated the feasibility of fabricating solar cells on the moon to facilitate space exploration. Silicon, which is used in the manufacture of solar panels, is abundant on the moon, and Perino argued that these solar panels would significantly reduce the cost of transporting power to space destinations. Thales Alenia Space was responsible for building over 50% of the pressurised volume of the International Space Station.

Perino was named Director of Advanced Exploration in 2010. She focusses on supporting early career scientists in the space industry.

== Awards and honours ==
- 2010 Association Imprenditrici E Donne Dirigenti D'Azienda (AIDDA) Woman of Excellence
- 2019 President of Italy Stella al Merito del Lavoro

== Selected publications ==
- Aaron Gronstal; Charles S Cockell; Maria Antonietta Perino; et al. (1 October 2007). "Lunar astrobiology: a review and suggested laboratory equipment". Astrobiology. 7 (5): 767–782. Bibcode:2007AsBio...7..767G. doi:10.1089/ast.2006.0082. ISSN 1531-1074. PMID 17963476. Wikidata Q36982708.
- Giancarlo Genta; Maria Antonietta Perino (1 December 2005). "Teleoperation support for early human planetary missions". Annals of the New York Academy of Sciences. 1065 (1): 271–284. Bibcode:2005NYASA1065..271G. doi:10.1196/annals.1370.008. ISSN 0077-8923. PMID 16510414. Wikidata Q38454049.
