= Bortolo Zambon =

Italian general

- Born: 5 July 1879; Treviso, Kingdom of Italy
- Died: 24 June 1967 (aged 87); Milan, Italy
- Military career
- Allegiance: Kingdom of Italy
- Branch: Royal Italian Army
- Rank: Major General
- Commands: 65th Infantry Regiment "Valtellina"; 27th Infantry Division "Brescia"
- Conflicts: Italo-Turkish War; Battle of Derna; World War I; Vlora War; Second Italo-Ethiopian War; World War II; North African campaign; Operation Sonnenblume; Operation Crusader; Italian Civil War
- Awards: Silver Medal of Military Valor (three times); Bronze Medal of Military Valor (twice)

Dino Bortolo Zambon (Treviso, 5 July 1879 – Milan, 24 June 1967) was an Italian general during World War II.

== Biography ==
He was born in Treviso on 5 July 1879, the son of Luigi and Angela Zambon. After attending the Royal Military Academy of Modena, he graduated with the rank of infantry second lieutenant on 5 September 1904. He participated in the Italo-Turkish War as a lieutenant, being awarded two bronze medals for military valor, and then in the First World War with the rank of captain and major. He later participated in operations in Albania during the Vlora War, where he was awarded a Silver Medal of Military Valor.

After a period as a staff officer, he was promoted to colonel on 16 November 1930, taking command of the 65th Infantry Regiment "Valtellina", and then assigned to the Ministry of Colonies in Rome. Between 1935 and 1936 he participated in the conquest of Ethiopia as commander of a machine gun group, receiving another silver medal for military valor. From 1 July 1937 he was promoted to brigadier general and assigned to the XVI Corps of Milan for special assignments. He was promoted to major general on 1 January 1940.

From 2 March 1941 he replaced General Giuseppe Cremascoli, suffering from serious illness, in the command of the 27th Infantry Division "Brescia" in Tripolitania. He commanded the division during the operations for the reconquest of Cyrenaica and during the subsequent British counteroffensive in late 1941, after which he was repatriated at age sixty-two, after receiving his third silver medal for military valor. After his command in Africa, in July 1942 he was given an assignment to the Infantry Inspectorate in Rome, as general of the reserve.

After the armistice of Cassibile, he joined the Resistance with the battle name "Aryans", becoming a member of the National Liberation Committee of Northern Italy in Milan, where he directed "Visconti di Modrone" network to protect soldiers of the Royal Italian Army who had evaded capture by the Germans during Operation Achse, and later became commander of the CLNAI military zone of Milan. He participated in the meetings of the General Command of the CLNAI as military adviser. However, on 25 May 1944 he was arrested in Como along with General Giuseppe Robolotti (commander of CLNAI forces in Milan) by the Republican Police, who had been tipped off by a traitor, in the so-called "plot against the generals". On 14 August that year he managed to escape from the San Vittore prison together with his secretary Anna Fondrini Grella, journalist Indro Montanelli and a wealthy American living in Milan, Dorothy Gibson, thanks to the help of double agent Luca Osteria. He then took refuge in Switzerland, returning to Italy following the collapse of the Italian Social Republic and participating in the Liberation parade held in Milan on 6 May 1945, alongside Mario Argenton, Giovan Battista Stucchi, Ferruccio Parri, Raffaele Cadorna Jr., Luigi Longo and Enrico Mattei.

He died in 1967.
