= Giovanni Battista Oxilia =

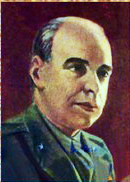
- Born: 18 November 1887; Turin, Kingdom of Italy
- Died: 21 August 1953 (aged 65); Turin, Italy
- Military career
- Allegiance: Kingdom of Italy; Yugoslav Partisans; Italy
- Branch: Royal Italian Army; Guardia di Finanza
- Service years: 1910–1947
- Rank: Lieutenant General
- Commands: 6th Artillery Regiment; 27th Infantry Division Brescia; 19th Infantry Division Venezia "Garibaldi" Partisan Division; Guardia di Finanza
- Conflicts: World War I; Italian occupation of Albania; World War II; Italian occupation of Montenegro; North African campaign
- Awards: Military Order of Savoy

Giovanni Battista Oxilia (Turin, 18 November 1887 – 21 August 1953) was an Italian general during World War II. He was commander-general of the Guardia di Finanza from 1945 to 1947.

== Biography ==
Oxilia began his military career in 1910, after having attended the officers’ course at the Academy of Artillery and Engineers, he graduated as Lieutenant. After promotion to Major he attended the Army War School. He later became Chief of Staff of the Milan Territorial Division, military attaché at the Italian Legation in Budapest, Chief of Staff of the Italian contingent deployed in the Saar during the 1935 referendum, and commander of the 6th Artillery Regiment.

On 30 June 1939 he was promoted to brigadier general. He served as Chief of Staff of the Bolzano Army Corps, commanded the artillery of the XXVI Corps in Albania in 1940 and later participated in the Italian occupation of Montenegro. He was Chief of Staff of the Eighth Army and commander of the artillery of the Fourth Army, before being transferred to head of the Italian Military Mission in Croatia.

Here, thanks to his persuasion work on poglavnik Ante Pavelić, he made possible the creation of a Croatian Legion that would fight on the Eastern Front as part of the Italian 8th Army. On March 13, 1942, while on his way from Zagreb to Ljubljana for reasons of service, he targeted by a partisan attack which however left him unharmed.

On 31 January 1942 he was promoted to major general, briefly assuming command of the 27th Infantry Division Brescia on the El Alamein front for a few weeks in August 1942 and being then attached to the North Africa General Headquarters from September 1942 to January 1943 before finally returning to Rome for special assignments on January 11, 1943. On 10 June 1943 he was given command of the 19th Infantry Division Venezia in Montenegro.

He was still in Montenegro when the Armistice of Cassibile was announced, and he rejected German demands for the surrender of his forces, instead joining the Yugoslav Resistance with his entire division as well as part of the 1st Alpine Division Taurinense. Troops from the two divisions formed the Italian Partisan Division "Garibaldi", which fought the Germans in Montenegro alongside the Yugoslavs, and of which Oxilia assumed command until February 1944, when he was repatriated and replaced by General Lorenzo Vivalda, former commander of the Taurinense Division.

After his returning to Italy, Oxilia became Deputy Chief of Staff of the Army and Undersecretary of the Ministry of War in the Bonomi III Cabinet. On 16 March 1945, he became Commander of the Guardia di Finanza, a post he held until June 15, 1947, after which he retired to private life. He retired from the Army in 1947, and died in 1953.
