= 19th Artillery Regiment "Venezia" =

Inactive Italian Army artillery unit

- 19° Reggimento Artiglieria "Venezia"
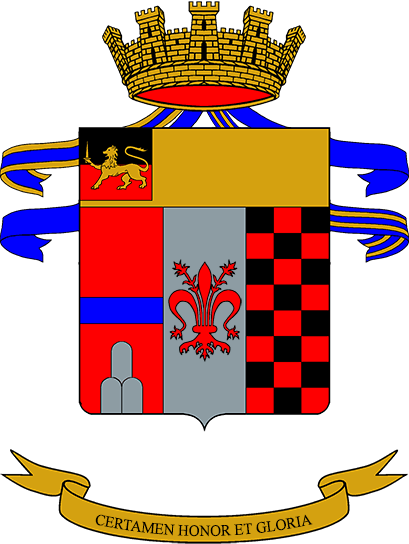
- Regimental coat of arms
- Active: 1 Nov. 1888 – 1 Dec. 1943; 1 Dec. 1975 – 8 Oct. 1993
- Country: Italy
- Branch: Italian Army
- Part of: Armored Brigade "Ariete"
- Garrison/HQ: Sequals
- Motto: "Certamen honor et gloria"
- Anniversaries: 15 June 1918 - Second Battle of the Piave River
- Decorations: 1x Gold Medal of Military Valor; 2x Bronze Medals of Military Valor; 1× Bronze Medal of Army Valor

Insignia
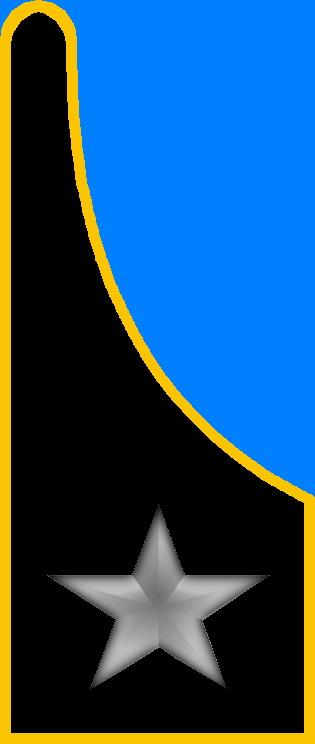
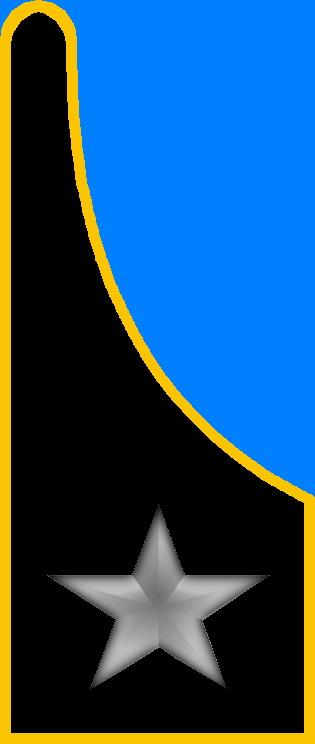
- Regimental gorget patches

The 19th Artillery Regiment "Venezia" (Italian: 19° Reggimento Artiglieria "Venezia") is an inactive field artillery regiment of the Italian Army, which was based in Sequals in Friuli-Venezia Giulia. Originally an artillery regiment of the Royal Italian Army, the regiment was formed in 1888 and served in World War I on the Italian front. In 1935 the regiment was assigned to the 19th Infantry Division "Gavinana", which participated in the Second Italo-Ethiopian War. In 1939 the division was renamed 19th Infantry Division "Venezia". The division fought in the Greco-Italian War of World War II and then remained in Yugoslavia on anti-partisan duty. The division and regiment were located in Montenegro, when the Armistice of Cassibile was announced on 8 September 1943. The division resisted German demands to surrender and on 10 October entered the 2nd Corps of the Yugoslav National Liberation Army. On 1 December 1943 the division was disbanded and the regiment's personnel entered the Partisan Division "Garibaldi".

The unit was reformed in 1975 as 19th Self-propelled Field Artillery Group "Rialto" and assigned to the 8th Mechanized Brigade "Garibaldi". In 1993 the group was disbanded and its personnel, materiel, and base were assigned to the 132nd Self-propelled Field Artillery Regiment "Ariete". The regimental anniversary falls, as for all Italian Army artillery regiments, on June 15, the beginning of the Second Battle of the Piave River in 1918.

== History ==
On 1 November 1888 the 14th Field Artillery Regiment was formed in Florence. The new regiment consisted of eight batteries and one train company ceded by the 7th Field Artillery Regiment. The ceded batteries had participated in the First, Second, and Third Italian War of Independence. One of the ceded batteries had distinguished itself in the First Italian War of Independence during the multi-day Battle of Custoza in 1848 and been awarded a Bronze Medal of Military Valor, which was affixed to the regiment's flag and is depicted on the regiment's coat of arms.

In 1895–96 the regiment formed the 8th Battery, which consisted of eight officers and 116 troops. The battery was sent to Eritrea for the First Italo-Ethiopian War. In 1911–12 the regiment's 3rd Battery and one of its group commands were sent to Rhodes in the Italian Islands of the Aegean for the duration of the Italo-Turkish War. The regiment also provided eight officers and 245 troops for other deployed units. On 1 March 1912 the regiment ceded its III Group to help form the 32nd Field Artillery Regiment.

=== World War I ===
At the outbreak of World War I the regiment was assigned, together with the Brigade "Ancona" and Brigade "Venezia", to the 15th Division. At the time the regiment consisted of a command, three groups with a combined eight batteries equipped with 75/27 mod. 06 field guns, and a depot. During the war the regiment's depot formed three siege batteries. During the war the regiment fought on the Monte Cellina in 1915, on Monte Carbonile in the Valsugana in April 1916. At the beginning of the Battle of Asiago on 15 May 1916 the regiment was on Monte Collo. From July to October 1916 the regiment was in the sector of the Colbricon. During the Battle of Caporetto the regiment was on Monte Pertica and then fell back to the Col della Berretta. In December 1917 the regiment fought on Monte Grappa on the Asolone ridge. The year 1918 began for the regiment with the Battles of Monte Grappa on Asolone, before fighting in the Second Battle of the Piave River on Monte Pertica again. During the Battle of Vittorio Veneto the regiment advanced from Monte Pertica over the Asolone to Fonzaso.

In 1926 the regiment was assigned to the 19th Territorial Division of Florence and consisted of a command, one group with 100/17 mod. 14 howitzers, two groups with 75/27 mod. 11 field guns, one group with mule-carried 75/13 mod. 15 mountain guns, and a depot. In September 1932 the regiment's III Group replaced its 75/27 mod. 11 field guns with mule-carried 75/13 mod. 15 mountain guns. On 30 September 1934 the regiment's IV Group with mule-carried 75/13 mod. 15 mountain guns was disbanded and the group's personnel, materiel and mules transferred to the 1st Field Artillery Regiment. The next day a new IV Group for the regiment was formed with the 10th and 11th batteries of the Complement Officer Cadets School in Lucca. The new IV Group remained in Lucca and continued its assignment of training officer cadets.

=== Second Italo-Ethiopian War ===
In January 1935 the division was renamed 19th Infantry Division "Gavinana" and consequently the regiment changed its name to 19th Artillery Regiment "Gavinana". On 6 February 1935 the regiment was mobilized in preparation for the Second Italo-Ethiopian War. The regiment departed Italy with three groups with mule-carried 75/13 mod. 15 mountain guns. One of the groups had been transferred from the 21st Artillery Regiment "Po" and one from the 26th Artillery Regiment "Rubicone". The regiment's remaining two groups in Florence and its detached group in Lucca entered the reformed 43rd Artillery Regiment "Gavinana II". The 19th Infantry Division "Gavinana" and with it the regiment fought October 1935 in the battles at Adwa in February 1936 in the Second Battle of Tembien and the following attack near Shire.

The division was demobilized in July 1936 and the regiment returned to Italy, where the two attached groups returned to their regiments. On 30 September 1936 the 43rd Artillery Regiment "Gavinana II" was disbanded and the next day the 19th Artillery Regiment "Gavinana" consisted of a command, a command unit, the I Group with 100/17 mod. 14 howitzers, the II Group with 75/27 mod. 11 field guns, the III and IV groups with mule-carried 75/13 mod. 15 mountain guns, and a depot. A few month later the regiment added an anti-aircraft battery with 20/65 mod. 35 anti-aircraft guns.

On 15 April 1939 the division was renamed 19th Infantry Division "Venezia" and consequently the regiment was renamed 19th Artillery Regiment "Venezia". The division also included the 83rd Infantry Regiment "Venezia" and 84th Infantry Regiment "Venezia". The same month Italy invaded Albania and the division was transferred to Albania as occupation force. As the 19th Infantry Division "Venezia" was now based permanently in the Italian protectorate of Albania, the division's depots in Italy formed the 41st Infantry Division "Firenze", which included the 41st Artillery Regiment "Firenze", as replacement.

=== World War II ===
During World War II the regiment was assigned to the 19th Infantry Division "Venezia", which also included the 83rd Infantry Regiment "Venezia" and 84th Infantry Regiment "Venezia". In July 1940, the regiment transferred a group with 75/27 mod. 11 field guns to the 14th Artillery Regiment "Ferrara" and received a newly formed group with 100/17 mod. 16 howitzers in return. Afterwards the regiment consisted of a command, command unit, the I Group with 100/17 mod. 16 howitzers, the II Group with 75/18 mod. 34 howitzers, the III Group with 75/13 mod. 15 mountain guns, the IV Group with 100/17 mod. 14 howitzers, and an anti-aircraft battery with 20/65 mod. 35 anti-aircraft guns.

The 19th Infantry Division "Venezia" participated in the Greco-Italian War from the beginning. On 3 November 1940 the division clashed with Greek forces on its right flank. On 16 November the Venezia was outflanked by the Greek breakthrough to Ersekë and by 21 November the Venezia barely held the Pogradec–Buçimas–Bregu i Zervaskës line on the southern tip of Lake Ohrid. The Greeks resumed their attack 26 November and the Venezia was forced to retreat on 29 November 1940. The rapid Greek advance resulted in elements of the division being stranded on 9 December on the Breshenihcut mountain and a rescue was only mounted on 23–24 December 1940. During the German invasion of Greece in April 1941, the Venezia pursued retreating Greek forces. After the war the division remained on garrison duty in Albania.

For its conduct and sacrifice in the Greco-Italian War the 19th Artillery Regiment "Venezia" was awarded a Bronze Medal of Military Valor, which was affixed to the regiment's flag and is depicted on the regiment's coat of arms.

In July 1941 the division was transferred to the Sandžak in Montenegro. Throughout its time in Montenegro the division was locked in fighting with Yugoslav partisans. In May 1942 the regiment transferred its IV Group with 100/17 mod. 14 howitzers and a newly formed Group with 75/27 mod. 11 field guns to the 159th Artillery Regiment "Veneto" of the 159th Infantry Division "Veneto".

After the Armistice of Cassibile was announced on 8 September 1943, Wehrmacht forces and Yugoslav Chetniks demanded the Venezia disarm, but both were refused. The division consolidated at Berane and on 10 October 1943 the division entered the 2nd Corps of Tito's National Liberation Army. On 13 October the division began an offensive against German forces in Brodarevo, Murina, Berane and Kolašin. On 1 December 1943 the division was split in smaller units and the 19th Artillery Regiment "Venezia" was disbanded.

For its conduct and bravery in the Montenegro in fall 1943 the 19th Artillery Regiment "Venezia" was awarded a Gold Medal of Military Valor, which was affixed to the regiment's flag and is depicted on the regiment's coat of arms.

=== Cold War ===
During the 1975 army reform the army disbanded the regimental level and newly independent battalions and groups were granted for the first time their own flags. On 1 December 1975 the 132nd Armored Artillery Regiment's II Self-propelled Field Artillery Group in Sequals was renamed 19th Self-propelled Field Artillery Group "Rialto" and assigned to the 8th Mechanized Brigade "Garibaldi". To avoid confusion with the 84th Infantry Battalion "Venezia" the group was named Rialto, which is the central area of Venice. The group consisted of a command, a command and services battery, the 1st Battery "Firenze", the 2nd Battery "Gavinana", and the 3rd Battery "Venezia". The group was equipped with M109G 155 mm self-propelled howitzers and fielded 477 men (38 officers, 62 non-commissioned officers, and 377 soldiers).

On 12 November 1976 the President of the Italian Republic Giovanni Leone assigned with decree 846 the flag and traditions of the 19th Artillery Regiment "Venezia" to the group. For its conduct and work after the 1976 Friuli earthquake the group was awarded a Bronze Medal of Army Valor, which was affixed to the group's flag and added to the group's coat of arms. On 25 April 1979 Venice awarded the group an honorary citizenship for the conduct of the 19th Artillery Regiment "Venezia" between 8 September and 1 December 1943 in Montenegro.

=== Recent times ===
On 30 January 1991 the group was transferred from the 8th Mechanized Brigade "Garibaldi" to the 132nd Armored Brigade "Ariete". On 8 October 1993 the flag of the 19th Self-propelled Field Artillery Group "Rialto" departed the group's base in Sequals and began its journey to the Shrine of the Flags in the Vittoriano in Rome. The next day personnel and materiel of the disbanded group were used to reform the 132nd Self-propelled Field Artillery Regiment "Ariete". On 11 November of the same year the flag of the 19th Artillery Regiment "Venezia" was deposited in Shrine of the Flags in the Vittoriano in Rome for safekeeping until the regiment is reactivated again.

== See also ==
- Armored Brigade "Ariete"
