= 27th Infantry Division "Brescia" =

Infantry division of the Royal Italian Army during World War II

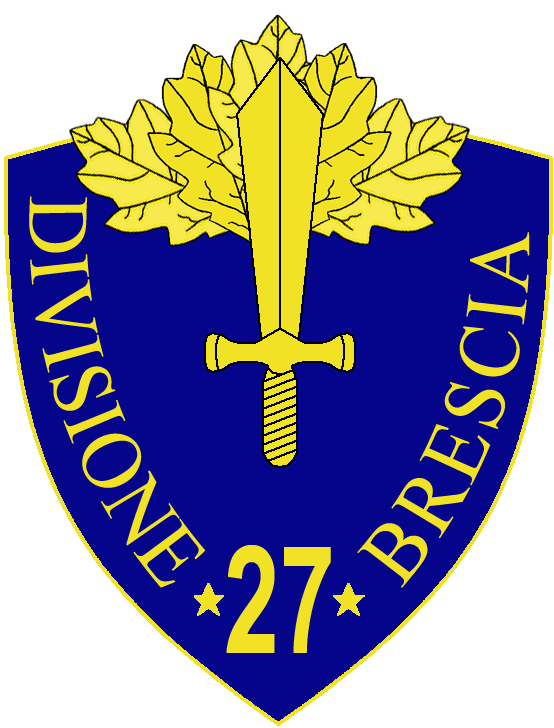
- 27th Infantry Division "Brescia" insignia
- Active: 1939–1943
- Country: Kingdom of Italy
- Branch: Royal Italian Army
- Type: Infantry
- Size: Division
- Part of: XXI Army Corps
- Garrison/HQ: Catanzaro
- Engagements: Second Italo-Ethiopian War World War II: Siege of Tobruk; Battle of Gazala; Battle of Mersa Matruh; First Battle of El Alamein; Second Battle of El Alamein

Insignia
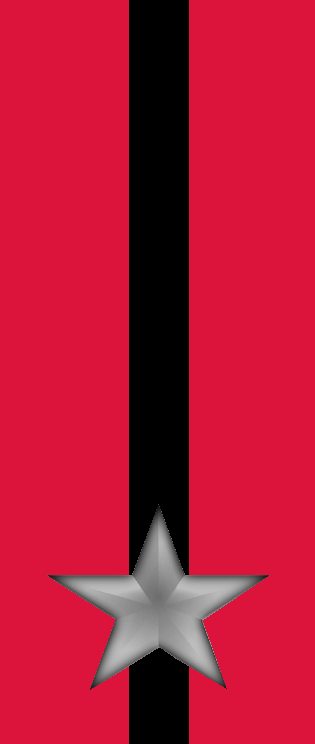
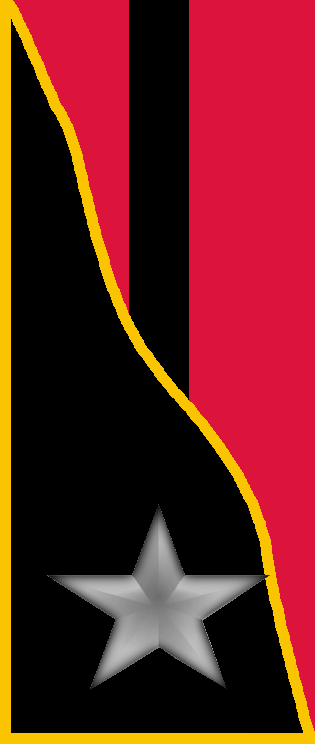
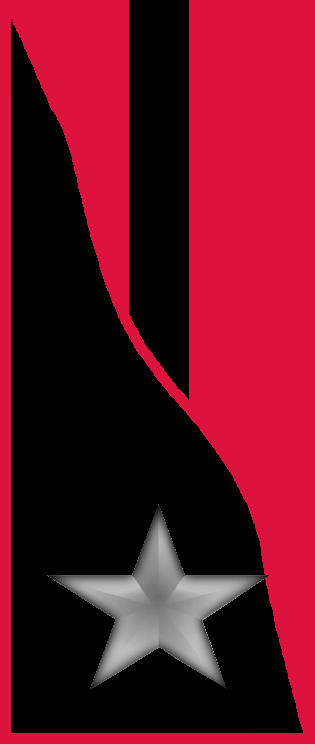
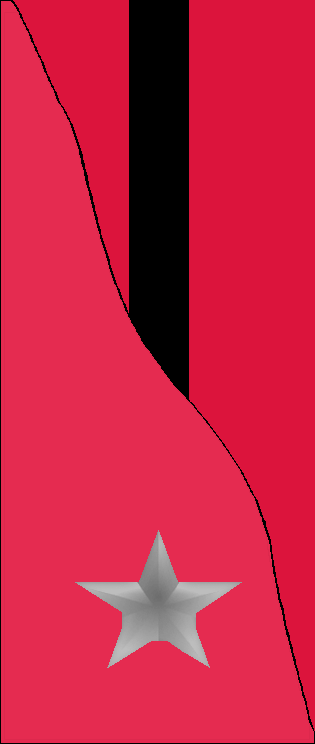
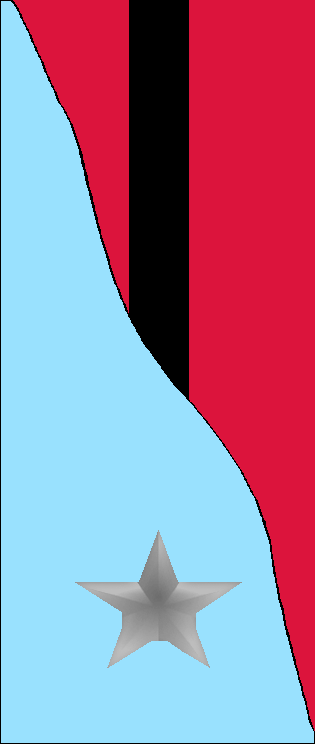
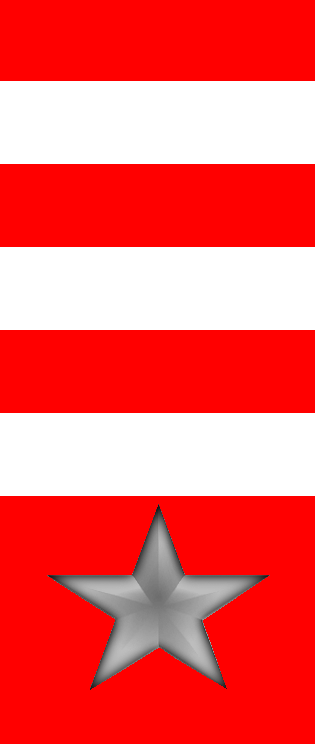
- Identification symbol: Brescia Division gorget patches

The 27th Infantry Division "Brescia" (Italian: 27ª Divisione di fanteria "Brescia") was an infantry division of the Royal Italian Army during World War II. The Brescia was named after the city of Brescia in Lombardy. The Brescia was classified as an auto-transportable division, meaning it had some motorized transport, but not enough to move the entire division at once.

The Brescia had its recruiting area and regimental depots in Calabria and its headquarters in Catanzaro. Its two infantry regiments were based in Catanzaro (19th) and Reggio Calabria (20th), with the division's artillery regiment based in Catanzaro. The division's regimental depots were shared with the 61st Infantry Division "Sirte", which was based in Misrata in Libya and recruited its men from and trained them in Calabria. Shortly after its formation the division was sent to Zawiya in Italian Libya. It participated in the Western Desert campaign and was destroyed during the Second Battle of El Alamein.

== History ==
After the Second Italian War of Independence the Austrian Empire had to cede the Lombardy region of the Kingdom of Lombardy–Venetia to the Kingdom of Sardinia. After taking control of the region the government of Sardinian ordered the Royal Sardinian Army on 29 August 1859 to raise five infantry brigades and one grenadier brigade in Lombardy. Subsequently on 1 November 1859 the Brigade "Brescia" was activated with the re-raised 19th Infantry Regiment and 20th Infantry Regiment.

=== World War I ===
During World War I the brigade fought initially on the Italian front, but in April 1918 it was transferred together with the Brigade "Alpi" Brigade "Napoli", and Brigade "Salerno" to the Western Front in France. There the brigades fought in the Third Battle of the Aisne, Second Battle of the Marne, Battle of Saint-Thierry, and the Hundred Days Offensive.

On 6 November 1926 the brigade assumed the name of XXVII Infantry Brigade with the 16th Infantry Regiment "Savona", 19th Infantry Regiment "Brescia", and 20th Infantry Regiment "Brescia". The brigade was the infantry component of the 27th Territorial Division of Catanzaro, which also included the 12th Artillery Regiment. In 1934 the division changed its name to 27th Infantry Division "Sila".

=== Second Italo-Ethiopian War ===
In late summer 1935 the division was sent to Eritrea for the Second Italo-Ethiopian War and in October 1935 participated in the capture of Mek'ele. From 4 November 1935 it was stationed in the Adigrat and in December 1935 it fought in the Ādī K’edawīt - Doghea pass area. The division undertook reconnaissance raids towards Ziban Debrī Bota and Celecot. On 19 January 1936 the Sila broke through the Ethiopian defenses and captured several towns in Tembien Province. It did not participate in the nearby First Battle of Tembien and acted only in the final stages of Battle of Amba Aradam, capturing Āmba Ālagē on 26 February 1936. In March 1936, the Sila moved to Finarwa - Sek'ot'a region where it stayed until the end of war.

From 20 September 1935 to 15 November 1936, while the Sila division was in Africa, the division's depots continued to train conscrips, who were used to temporarily reform the 132nd Infantry Regiment "Lazio", 243rd Infantry Regiment "Cosenza", 244th Infantry Regiment "Cosenza", and 45th Artillery Regiment, which were all assigned to the temporarily formed 127th Infantry Division "Sila II". After the 27th Infantry Division "Sila" returned from Ethiopia the 127th Infantry Division "Sila II" and its regiments were disbanded and their personnel transferred to the regiments returning from their war.

=== World War II ===
On 27 April 1939 the division transferred the 16th Infantry Regiment "Savona" and 12th Artillery Regiment "Sila" to the newly activated 55th Infantry Division "Savona" and on the same date the XXVII Infantry Brigade was dissolved with its two remaining regiments came under direct command of the division, which changed its name to 27th Infantry Division "Brescia". In summer 1939 the division was transferred to Zawiya in Libya. On 12 September 1939 the 48th Infantry Division "Taro" was activated and housed in the barracks of the Brescia in mainland Italy. During the Italian invasion of France from 10-25 June 1940 the Brescia was deployed along the French Tunisian-Libyan border. After the signing of the Franco-Italian Armistice on 24 June 1940 the Brescia returned to its base and took up coastal defense duties to the west of Tripoli.

After the British Western Desert Force had crushed the 10th Army in Eastern Libya during Operation Compass the Brescia's 55th Artillery Regiment "Brescia", the infantry regiments' support weapons companies, and the 27th Anti-tank Company were sent in late December 1940 to shore up the Italian strongpoint at Tobruk, where the 55th Artillery Regiment "Brescia" was attached to the 61st Infantry Division "Sirte". The "Sirte" division and the 55th Artillery Regiment "Brescia" were overrun and destroyed on 21-22 January 1941 during the British capture of Tobruk.

In early March, 1941 the division consolidated at El Agheila and, together with German forces, started a counter-attack on 24 March 1941, which defeated British troops at Brega on 31 March 1941. The division entered Ajdabiya on 2 April 1941 and was tasked with the defense of the Axis communication lines. In April 1941 the division received the 1st Fast Artillery Regiment "Eugenio di Savoia" from the 1st Cavalry Division "Eugenio di Savoia" to replace the destroyed 55th Artillery Regiment "Brescia".

==== Siege of Tobruk ====
On 12 April 1941 Italian and German forces commenced the Siege of Tobruk and the Brescia together with the German 3rd Reconnaissance Battalion of the 21st Panzer Division advanced to the port of Bardia, where several hundred British prisoners and a large quantity of allied materiel was taken. As the attack on Tobruk was stalling and General Erwin Rommel was forced to order the Brescia to return to reinforce the siege of Tobruk. During the night of 30 April 1941 an Italo-German force attacked the Tobruk defenses and the 132nd Armored Division "Ariete" and the Brescia captured seven strong points (R2, R3, R4, R5, R6, R7 and R8). During the night of 3 May the Australians counterattacked, but the Italian 102nd Motorized Division "Trento" and 17th Infantry Division "Pavia" and German panzergrenadiers repelled the attack On the night of 16 May the Brescia retaliated with the help of two platoons of the XXXII Sappers Battalion and breached the defensive perimeter of the Australian 2/9th and 2/10th Battalions. With the obstacles removed, the Brescia troops captured the strongpoints S8, S9 and S10. The Australians fought back and the commanding officer of the XXXII Mixed Engineer Battalion Colonel Emilio Caizzo was killed during a satchel attack and awarded posthumously Italy's highest military honor the Gold Medal of Military Valor. Among the objectives initially selected during the planning of the British offensive Operation Brevity was the recapture of S8 and S9.

On 24 May the Brescia, which had taken over the western front of Tobruk, repelled an attacking Australian infantry force, which was supported by tanks. On 2 August, another attack was launched to recover the lost strong points, but the attacking forces from the Australian 2/43rd Battalion and 2/28th Battalions were repulsed. This was the last Australian effort to recover the lost fortifications.

==== Operation Crusader ====
On 27 November 1941 the British offensive Operation Crusader reached the siege ring around Tobruk and for the next 13 days the battle to break the siege raged. The Brescia, as part of the besieging forces, held out with the other Axis forces until 8-9 December 1941, when the order to retreat to Ain el Gazala was given. The Brescia's last action at Tobruk was a fight with the British 70th Division and Polish Carpathian Rifle Brigade for control of the White Knoll position.

On 11 December a retreating battalion of the Brescia came within 50 yards of the 23rd New Zealand Battalion and was cut down by machine gun fire. The Axis forces retreated to Ain el Gazala, where on 15 December, the Brescia held its ground against the 2nd New Zealand Division and Carpathian Rifle Brigade, allowing a strong Italo-German armored force to counterattack and overrun the 1st British Battalion, The Buffs.. On 18 December British forces outflanked the Brescia in the south and so the division had to retreat to Ajdabiya, where it arrived on 22 December 1941.

==== Battle of Gazala ====
In January 1942 the Brescia was defending a front around Qabr al Fārigh, south-west of Derna. It moved its positions forward to Qabr al Fārigh (south of Derna, Libya in April 1942. During the Battle of Gazala, the Brescia played an important role in the capture of 6,000 prisoners on 16 June 1942, after the 101st Motorized Division "Trieste" and 15th Panzer Division had destroyed the British 2nd and 4th Armoured Brigades. operating at Ghawţ al ‘Abīdī depression.

==== Battle of Mersa Matruh ====
After the successful Battle of Gazala the Brescia advanced, passing to the south of Tobruk on 20 June 1942 and continuing through Bardia, As Sallūm and Sidi Barrani, the division arrived in Mersa Matruh on 29 June 1942. During the brief siege of Mersa Matruh in June 1942 Axis forces captured 6,000 British troops and large quantities of supplies.

==== First and Second Battles of El Alamein ====
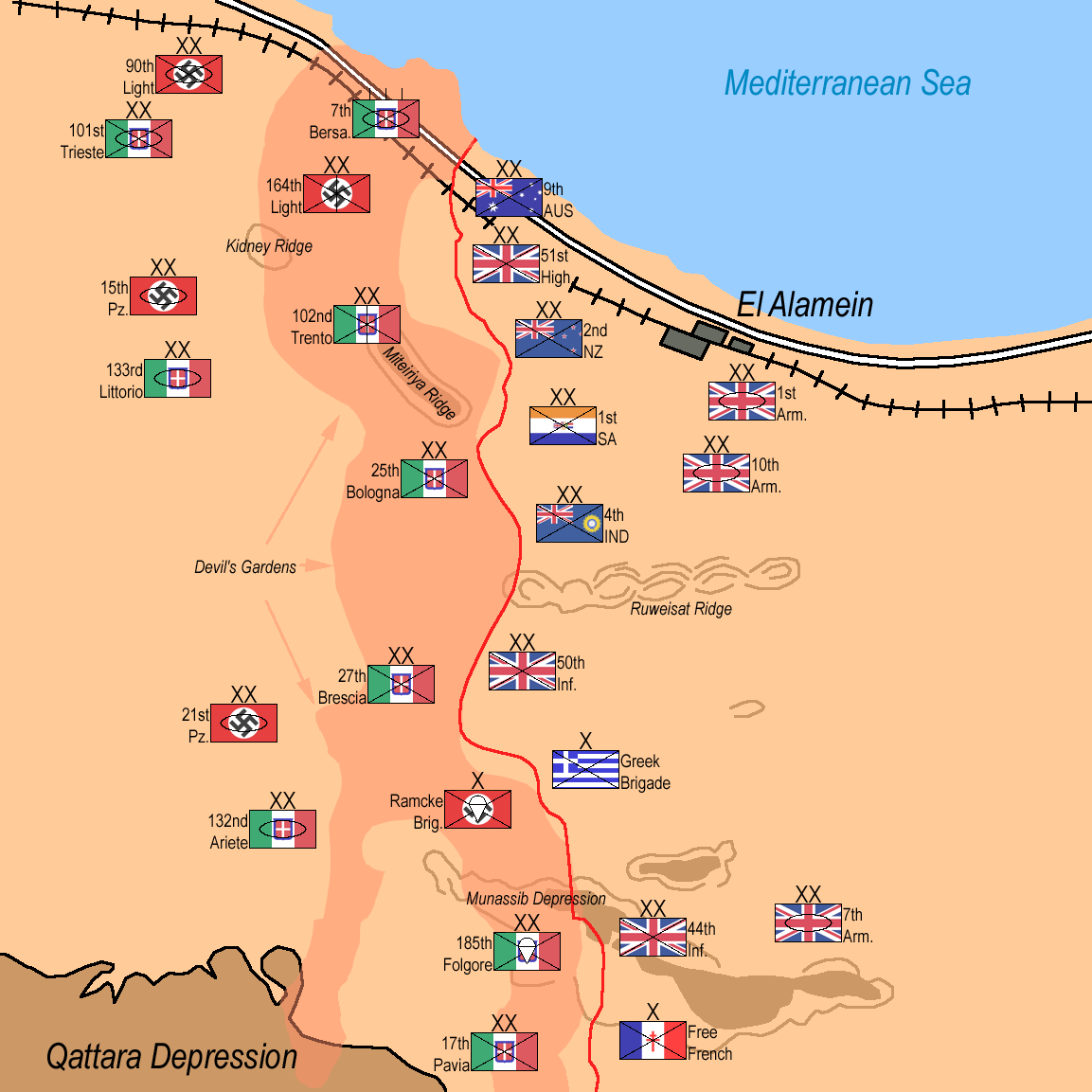
Division locations before the Second Battle of El Alamein

During the initial stages of the First Battle of El Alamein in July 1942 the Brescia was deployed on the El Mreir ridge and repelled a strong attack of the 5th New Zealand Infantry Brigade. Later, during the defense of Ruweisat Ridge, the 19th Infantry Regiment of the Brescia put up a tenacious defense, losing a battalion and three company commanders in this night action, before being partly overrun at dawn on 15 July, delaying the Allied advance long enough for German armored forces to launch a devastating counterattack. Between 21 and 27 July 1942 British counter-attacks were so ferocious that the Brescia was forced end its advance to the south of El Alamein.

During the Second Battle of El Alamein the Brescia held its positions against British armored attacks from 24 October to 4 November 1942. When the order was given to withdraw the Brescia retreated along the Deir Sha'la - Fukah route. The lack of transport resulted in Allied units catching up and annihilating the Brescia on 7 November 1942, within the sight of Fukah, where other shattered Axis units has already gathered. The division was officially dissolved on 25 November 1942.

== Organization ==
=== Second Italo-Ethiopian War ===
- 27th Infantry Division "Sila"
  - XXVII Infantry Brigade
    - 16th Infantry Regiment "Savona"
    - 19th Infantry Regiment "Brescia"
    - 20th Infantry Regiment "Brescia"
  - 12th Artillery Regiment (3x artillery groups with 75/13 field guns)
  - XXVII Machine Gun Battalion
  - XXVII Replacements Battalion
  - 12th Engineer Company
  - 27th Signal Company
  - Divisional Services

=== World War II ===
==== Auto-transportable North-African-type 40 ====
27th Infantry Division "Brescia" organization in 1940

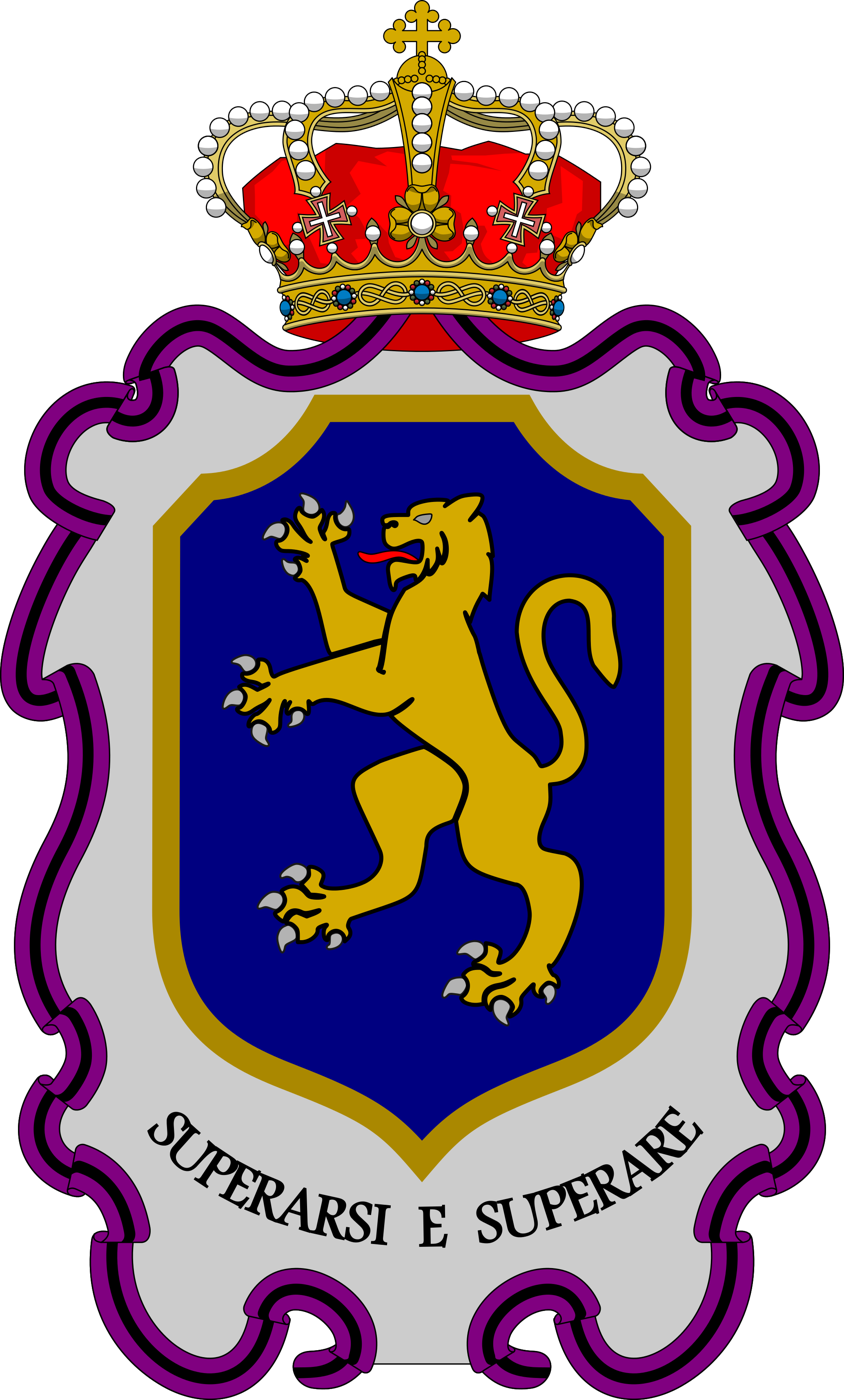
Coat of Arms of the 19th Infantry Regiment "Brescia", 1939

- 27th Infantry Division "Brescia", in Catanzaro
  - Headquarters
    - Command Company
    - 127th Carabinieri Section
    - 96th Field Post Office
    - 27th Infantry Division Command Transport Squad
  - 19th Infantry Regiment "Brescia", in Catanzaro
    - Command Company
    - 3 × Fusilier battalions
      - Command Company, 3 × Fusilier companies, 1 × Weapons Company (Breda M37 heavy machine guns and 45mm mod. 35 mortars)
    - Support Weapons Battery (65/17 mod. 13 infantry support guns; destroyed on 5 February 1941)
    - Support Weapons Battery, 34th Infantry Regiment, 4th Infantry Division "Livorno" (65/17 mod. 13 infantry support guns; replaced the destroyed Support Weapons Battery)
    - Mortar Company (81mm mod. 35 mortars)
  - 20th Infantry Regiment "Brescia", in Reggio Calabria
    - Command Company
    - 3 × Fusilier battalions
      - Command Company, 3 × Fusilier companies, 1 × Weapons Company (Breda M37 heavy machine guns and 45mm mod. 35 mortars)
    - Support Weapons Battery (65/17 mod. 13 infantry support guns; destroyed on 5 February 1941)
    - Support Weapons Battery, 38th Infantry Regiment, 3rd Infantry Division "Ravenna" (65/17 mod. 13 infantry support guns; replaced the destroyed Support Weapons Battery)
    - Mortar Company (81mm mod. 35 mortars)
  - 55th Artillery Regiment "Brescia", in Catanzaro (destroyed during the British capture of Tobruk in January 1941)
    - Command Unit
    - I Group (100/17 mod. 14 howitzers)
    - II Group (75/27 mod. 06 field guns; transferred from the 9th Artillery Regiment "Brennero")
    - III Group (75/27 mod. 06 field guns)
    - 1 × Anti-aircraft Battery (20/65 mod. 35 anti-aircraft guns)
    - Ammunition and Supply Unit
  - 1st Fast Artillery Regiment "Eugenio di Savoia" (assigned in August 1941 as replacement for the destroyed 55th Artillery Regiment "Brescia")
    - Command Unit
    - I Group (100/17 mod. 14 howitzers; joined the regiment in North Africa)
    - II Group (100/17 mod. 14 howitzers; joined the regiment in North Africa)
    - III Group (75/27 mod. 06 field guns)
    - IV Group (75/27 mod. 06 field guns)
    - V Anti-aircraft Group (formed in fall 1941)
    - 401st Anti-aircraft Battery (20/65 mod. 35 anti-aircraft guns; joined the regiment in 1941)
    - 404th Anti-aircraft Battery (20/65 mod. 35 anti-aircraft guns; joined the regiment in 1941)
    - 502th Anti-aircraft Battery (20/65 mod. 35 anti-aircraft guns; joined the regiment in 1941)
    - Ammunition and Supply Unit
  - XXVII Machine Gun Battalion (reorganized as Support Weapons Battalion in summer 1941)
  - XXVII Support Weapons Battalion (formed in summer 1941)
    - Command Company, 1 × Anti-tank Company (47/32 mod. 35 anti-tank guns), 1 × Mortar Company (81mm mod. 35 mortars), 1 × Anti-aircraft Battery (20/65 mod. 35 anti-aircraft guns)
  - XXVII Mixed Engineer Battalion
    - 27th Telegraph and Radio Operators Company
    - 82nd Engineer Company
  - 27th Anti-tank Company (47/32 mod. 35 anti-tank guns; destroyed on 5 February 1941)
  - 227th Anti-tank Company (47/32 mod. 35 anti-tank guns; replaced the destroyed 27th Anti-tank Company)
  - 34th Medical Section
    - 95th Field Hospital
    - 2 × Field hospitals
    - 35th Surgical unit
  - 34th Supply Section
  - 328th Transport Section

The following units were attached to the division during the Western Desert Campaign:

- 5th Anti-tank Company (47/32 anti-tank guns)
- 71st Anti-tank Company (47/32 anti-tank guns)

==== Auto-transportable North-African-type 42 ====
On 2 January 1942, after the Italian divisions had suffered heavy losses of personnel and equipment during the British Operation Crusader, General Ettore Bastico, the commander of Axis forces in North Africa, ordered that frontline infantry divisions in North Africa, with the exception of the 101st Motorized Division "Trieste", should be reorganized according to the new Auto-transportable North-African-type 42 table of organization and equipment. To reduce the logistic requirements the divisions were reduced to 7,000 men and all their support and transport units were transferred to the direct control to the Italian North African Armed Forces Command. The divisions' infantry regiments were cut down to two battalions of four fusilier companies each and the regiment's heavy weapons, along with the heavy weapons of the divisions' Support Weapons Battalion, were distributed equally among the companies. Each fusilier company then consisted of a command, a fusilier platoon, a machine gun platoon with three Breda M37 heavy machine guns, an anti-tank platoon with three S-18/1000 anti-tank rifles, and an anti-tank platoon with three 47/32 mod. 35 anti-tank guns. Bastico also ordered that, if men and materiel should become available, each regiment was to form a third battalion. Additionally it was planned to strengthen the divisions' artillery regiments by adding a fourth artillery group equipped with 100/17 mod. 16 howitzers and an anti-aircraft/anti-tank group with either German 8.8 cm Flak cannons or Italian 90/53 cannons. However, due to the difficulty of shipping the required materiel across the Mediterranean most infantry and artillery regiments never received the full complement of men and material. Afterwards the 27th Infantry Division "Brescia" consisted of the following units:

27th Infantry Division "Brescia" organization in 1942

- 27th Infantry Division "Brescia"
  - Headquarters
    - Command Company
    - 127th Carabinieri Section
    - 96th Field Post Office
    - 27th Infantry Division Command Transport Squad
  - 19th Infantry Regiment "Brescia"
    - Command Company
    - 2 × Fusilier battalions
      - Command Company, 4 × Fusilier companies, each consisting of a command, and 1 × Fusilier Platoon, 1 × Machine Gun Platoon (Breda M37 heavy machine guns), 1 × Anti-tank Platoon (S-18/1000 anti-tank rifles), 1 × Anti-tank Platoon (47/32 mod. 35 anti-tank guns)
    - Mortar Company (81mm mod. 35 mortars)
  - 20th Infantry Regiment "Brescia"
    - Command Company
    - 3 × Fusilier battalions (initially 2 × Fusilier battalions, but by October 1942 the regiment's III Fusilier Battalion had been reformed)
      - Command Company, 4 × Fusilier companies, each consisting of a command, and 1 × Fusilier Platoon, 1 × Machine Gun Platoon (Breda M37 heavy machine guns), 1 × Anti-tank Platoon (S-18/1000 anti-tank rifles), 1 × Anti-tank Platoon (47/32 mod. 35 anti-tank guns)
    - Mortar Company (81mm mod. 35 mortars)
  - 1st Fast Artillery Regiment "Eugenio di Savoia"
    - Command Unit
    - I Group (100/17 mod. 14 howitzers)
    - II Group (100/17 mod. 14 howitzers)
    - III Group (75/27 mod. 06 field guns)
    - IV Group (75/27 mod. 06 field guns)
    - V Anti-aircraft Group (8.8 cm Flak; joined the regiment in May 1942)
    - 401st Anti-aircraft Battery (20/65 mod. 35 anti-aircraft guns)
    - 404th Anti-aircraft Battery (20/65 mod. 35 anti-aircraft guns)
    - Ammunition and Supply Unit
  - XXVII Mixed Engineer Battalion (transferred to the 136th Armored Division "Giovani Fascisti" after the Second Battle of El Alamein)
    - 27th Telegraph and Radio Operators Company
    - 1 × Engineer Company
    - 1 × Searchlight Section
  - 34th Medical Section
    - 95th Field Hospital
    - 2 × Field hospitals
    - 35th Surgical unit
  - 34th Supply Section

== Military honors ==
For their conduct during the Western Desert campaign the President of Italy awarded on 7 December 1951 to the division's two infantry regiments and the 1st Fast Artillery Regiment "Eugenio di Savoia" Italy's highest military honor, the Gold Medal of Military Valor.

- 19th Infantry Regiment "Brescia" on 7 December 1951
- 20th Infantry Regiment "Brescia" on 7 December 1951
- 1st Fast Artillery Regiment "Eugenio di Savoia" on 7 December 1951

== Commanding officers ==
The division's commanding officers were:

- Generale di Divisione Giuseppe Cremascoli (24 May 1939 - 8 February 1941, died of disease 9 April 1941)
- Colonel Domenico Canistrà (acting, 9-21 February 1942)
- Generale di Divisione Bortolo Zambon (22 February 1941 - 10 October 1941)
- Generale di Divisione Benvenuto Gioda (acting, 11 October 1941 - 1 January 1942
- Generale di Brigata Giacomo Lombardi (2 January 1942 - 16 July 1942, WIA)
- Generale di Divisione Dino Parri (17 July 1942 - 15 August 1942)
- Generale di Divisione Giovanni Battista Oxilia (16 August 1942 - 8 September 1942)
- Generale di Divisione Alessandro Predieri (9 September 1942 - 13 October 1942, KIA)
- Generale di Divisione Brunetto Brunetti (14 October 1942 - 5 November 1942, POW)
