= Giuseppe Cremascoli =

Italian general

- Born: 10 February 1883; Lanciano, Kingdom of Italy
- Died: 9 April 1941 (aged 58); Tripoli, Italian Libya
- Military career
- Allegiance: Kingdom of Italy
- Branch: Royal Italian Army
- Service years: 1904–1941
- Rank: Major General
- Commands: 231st Infantry Regiment "Avellino"; 6th Alpini Regiment; 27th Infantry Division "Brescia"
- Conflicts: Italo-Turkish War; First Italo-Senussi War; World War I; Battle of Asiago; White War; World War II; North African campaign; Italian invasion of Egypt; Operation Compass
- Awards: Silver Medal of Military Valor (twice); Bronze Medal of Military Valor

Giuseppe Cremascoli (10 February 1883 – 9 April 1941) was an Italian general during World War II.

== Biography ==
He was born in Lanciano, in the province of Chieti, on 10 February 1883. In 1904 he entered the Royal Military Academy of Modena, from which he graduated with the rank of second lieutenant of the Alpini on 5 September 1908, assigned to the 5th Alpini Regiment stationed in Milan. With the rank of lieutenant he took part in the Italo-Turkish War, being decorated with the Bronze Medal of Military Valor, and then in the First World War, with the ranks of captain and later major, being awarded two Silver Medals for Military Valor (for actions on Monte Cimone and in the Carnic Alps).

After serving as a staff officer, he was promoted to colonel on 30 November 1931, first taking command of the 231st Infantry Regiment "Avellino" and then that of the 6th Alpini Regiment. From 1 July 1937 he was promoted to brigadier general and assigned, as deputy commander, to the 27th Infantry Division "Sila" in Catanzaro, subsequently assuming command in May 1939, when it was renamed 27th Infantry Division "Brescia" and transferred to Tripolitania, where he established his headquarters in Zawiya. He was later promoted to major general.

After the beginning of hostilities with France and Great Britain, on 10 June 1940, he participated in the invasion of Egypt and in Operation Compass in command of the "Brescia" Division. He became seriously ill and on 1 March 1941, with the worsening of his condition, he had to be hospitalized in Tripoli and replaced by General Bortolo Zambon. He died on the following 9 April, and was buried in Tripoli.
