= 19th Infantry Division "Venezia" =

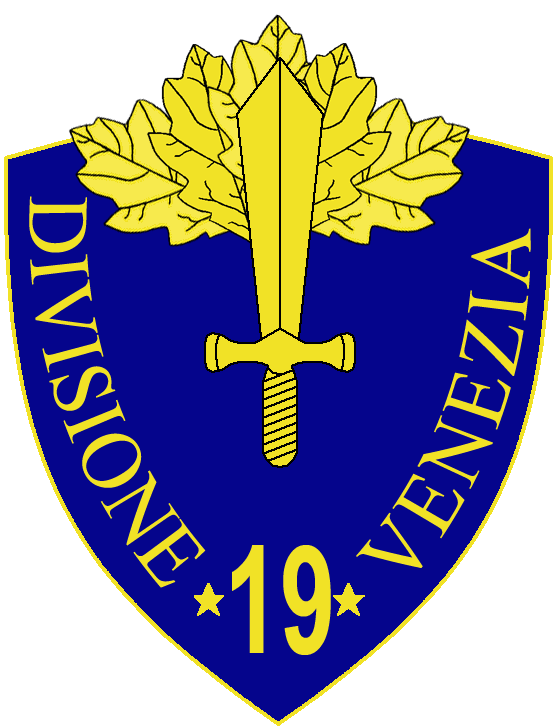
- 19th Infantry Division "Venezia" insignia
- Active: 1939–1943
- Country: Kingdom of Italy
- Branch: Royal Italian Army
- Type: Infantry
- Size: Division
- Garrison/HQ: Florence
- Engagements: Second Italo-Ethiopian War; Invasion of Albania; World War II

Commanders
- Notable commanders: Giovanni Battista Oxilia

Insignia
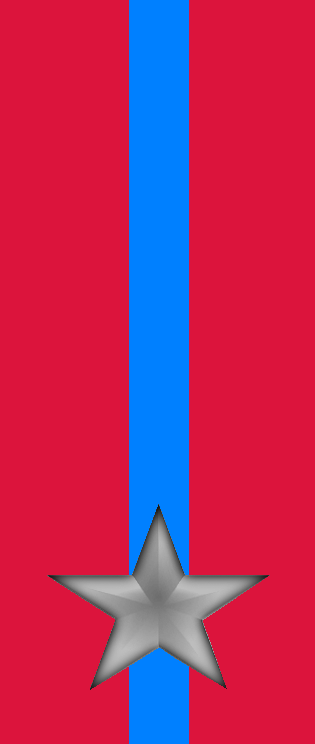
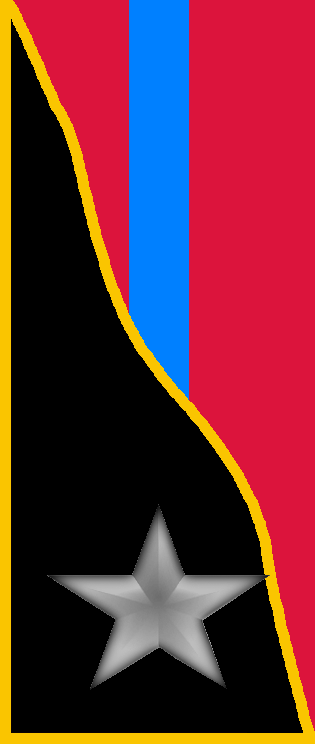
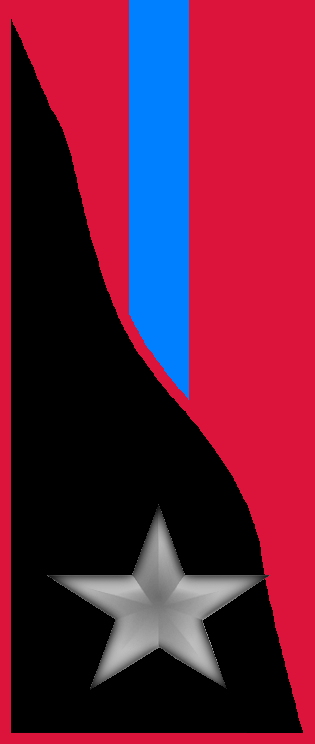
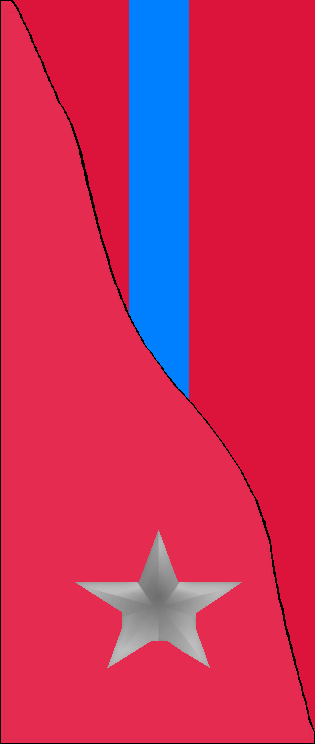
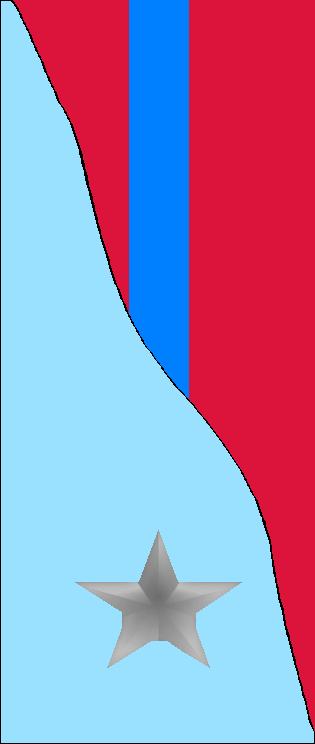
- Identification symbol: Venezia Division gorget patches

The 19th Infantry Division "Venezia" (Italian: 19ª Divisione di fanteria "Venezia") was a infantry division of the Royal Italian Army during World War II. The Venezia was a mountain-type infantry division, which meant that the division's artillery and logistics were moved by pack mules, while in standard infantry divisions artillery and logistics were moved by horse-drawn limbers and carriages. Italy's real mountain warfare divisions were the six alpine divisions manned by Alpini troops. The division was named for the city of Venice and based in Tuscany, from where it also recruited most of its troops. After the Armistice of Cassibile between the Allies and Italy was announced on 8 September 1943 the division joined the Yugoslav partisans in Montenegro and formed the Partisan Division "Garibaldi".

== History ==
The division's lineage begins with the Brigade "Venezia" established on 1 November 1883 in Alessandria with the 83rd and 84th infantry regiments.

=== World War I ===
The brigade fought on the Italian front in World War I. On 10 November 1926 the brigade assumed the name of XIX Infantry Brigade and received the 70th Infantry Regiment "Ancona" from the disbanded Brigade "Ancona". The brigade was the infantry component of the 19th Territorial Division of Florence, which also included the 19th Artillery Regiment. In 1934 the division changed its name to 19th Infantry Division "Gavinana".

=== Second Italo-Ethiopian War ===
In preparation for the Second Italo-Ethiopian War the division was mobilized on 28 March 1935 and shipped to Eritrea. The division was deployed near the Ethiopian border in the Adi Quala and Enda-Ghergis area. On 3 October 1935 the division crossed the Mareb River and took an Ethiopian fortified position at De’āro Teklē. On 4 October 1935 the division captured the town of Ādī Ābun and on 6 October 1935 it entered Adwa. The advance then stopped, as several battles were fought around Adwa, in particular at Inda Mīka’ēl to the south of the town. After the Ethiopian counterattack had stalled, the division participated in the Second Battle of Tembien, attacking on 26 February 1936 near Shire. On 2 March 1936 the division destroyed a large Ethiopian formation near Mai Nebri in Eritrea. On 3 March 1936 the division was in pursuit of retreating Ethiopian troops along the Tacazze river. The division then returned to Inda Silasē near Shire on 4 March 1936. On 5–7 March 1936 the division reached the town of Indabaguna, on 9 March 1936 Debarq, and on 2 April 1936 Dabat. The division was relieved from frontline duties on 22 April 1936 and sent to Axum. For the rest of war it participated in mopping-up operations around Mendefera.

From 10 March 1935 to 9 July 1936, while the Gavinana division was in Africa, the division's depots continued to train conscrips, who were used to temporarily reform the 127th Infantry Regiment "Firenze", 128th Infantry Regiment "Firenze", 213th Infantry Regiment "Arno", and 43rd Artillery Regiment, which were assigned to the temporarily formed 119th Infantry Division "Gavinana II". After the 19th Infantry Division "Gavinana" returned from Ethiopia the 119th Infantry Division "Gavinana II" and its regiments were disbanded and their personnel transferred to the regiments returning from their war.

After the war the division returned to Italy. On 9 March 1937 the 70th Infantry Regiment "Ancona" left the division and moved to Libya to join the 61st Infantry Division "Sirte". On the same day the division raised the 87th Infantry Regiment "Friuli" in Arezzo as replacement.

=== World War II ===
On 15 April 1939 the division, changed its name to "Venezia" and dissolved the XIX Infantry Brigade, with the infantry regiments coming under direct command of the division. On the same date the 19th Artillery Regiment was given the name "Venezia". On 15 September 1939 the division ceded the 87th Infantry Regiment "Friuli" to the 20th Infantry Division "Friuli".

==== Albania ====
The April 1939 the Venezia was mobilized for the invasion of Albania, landing in Durrës in Albania on 25–30 April 1939 and then occupying Elbasan and Pogradec to the East of Tirana. On 24 August 1939 the 41st Infantry Division "Firenze" was raised in Florence as replacement for the Venezia, which was to be based permanently in the Italian protectorate of Albania.

==== Greece ====
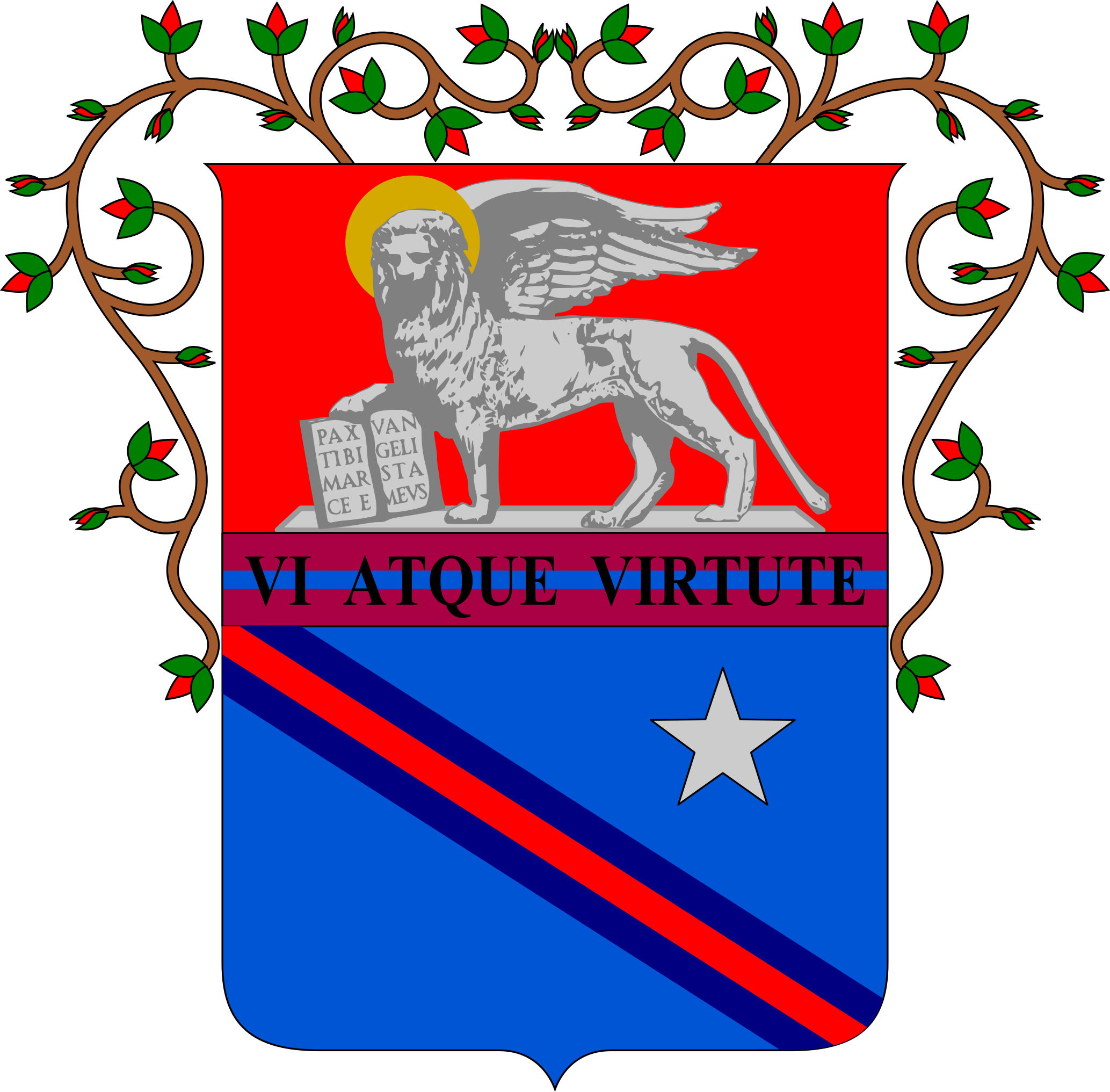
Coat of Arms of the 83rd Infantry Regiment "Venezia", 1939

On 10 June 1940, the day of Italy's entry into World War II, the Venezia was patrolling the Albanian-Yugoslav border in the area between the Drin valley and Bulqizë. As part of Italy's preparation for the attack on Greece the division was ordered on 26 October 1940 to move to Korçë near the border with Greece. On 2 November the division moved to the south of Lake Prespa to parry an anticipated Greek attack. Its defence stretched along the Zaroshkë-Bilisht-Kapshticë line. On 3 November 1940 Greek forces attacked the division's right flank. Although the Venezia initially held the position by 4–5 November 1940 it was pushed out of Kapshticë, Bilisht and Bitincke, falling back to the Devoll river.

Consequently, the Greeks shifted the focus of their attacks on the centre and left (northern) flank of the Venezia, but without much success despite heavy fighting on 8–15 November 1940. On 16 November the Venezia was outflanked by the Greek breakthrough to Ersekë. The Venezia tried to rectify this by pulling back its southern flank from the Devoll river, while the Greeks intensified their attacks on the retreating Italians on 17–19 November. On 21 November 1940 the Venezia lost contact with its neighbouring Italian forces on its southern flank and the division had to made a stand at the Pogradec–Buçimas–Bregu i Zervaskës line on the southern tip of Lake Ohrid. The Greeks resumed their attack 26 November 1940 and the Venezia was forced to retreat to the Shkumbin river valley after being outflanked on its right on 29 November 1940.

The division's rearguards fought a delaying battle on 1–7 December 1940 at the outskirts of Pogradec and on the southern shores of Lake Ohrid, from Kalasë to as far south as the Qafa e Vashës pass. The outstretched southern flank of the Venezia was retreating to the north, but the rapid Greek advance resulted in some elements of the division being stranded by 9 December 1940 on the Breshenihcut mountain. These troops were rescued on 23–24 December 1940. In early 1941 the division was reinforced by the 72nd CC.NN. Legion "Luigi Farini". Despite these reinforcement and severe weather conditions the Venezia's positions continued to crumble, resulting in the failure of the Kungullit mountain defence on 7 January 1941. This was the last major defeat for the Venezia, as the fighting's intensity began to decrease in January–March 1941. On 7 April 1941 a last Greek attack on Qafa e Vashës occurred.

On 14 April 1941 the Italian forces began a general offensive. The Venezia advanced first to Pogradec, and then turned south to Maliq and Korçë, capturing both on 15 April 1941, without meeting sustained resistance. On 18 April 1941 the Venezia reached Ersekë on the Greek border.

==== Montenegro ====
In July 1941 the division was transferred to Podgorica in Montenegro and in August moved its headquarter to Berane in the Montenegrin Sandžak. The division also garrisoned Kolasin and from February 1942 also Pljevlja, which became the base of the newly arrived 383rd Infantry Regiment "Venezia". Throughout its time in Montenegro the division was locked in fighting with Yugoslav partisans. On 17 June 1943 the 383rd Infantry Regiment "Venezia" was assigned to the Territorial Defense Command Albania and moved to Tirana.

==== Fighting the Germans ====
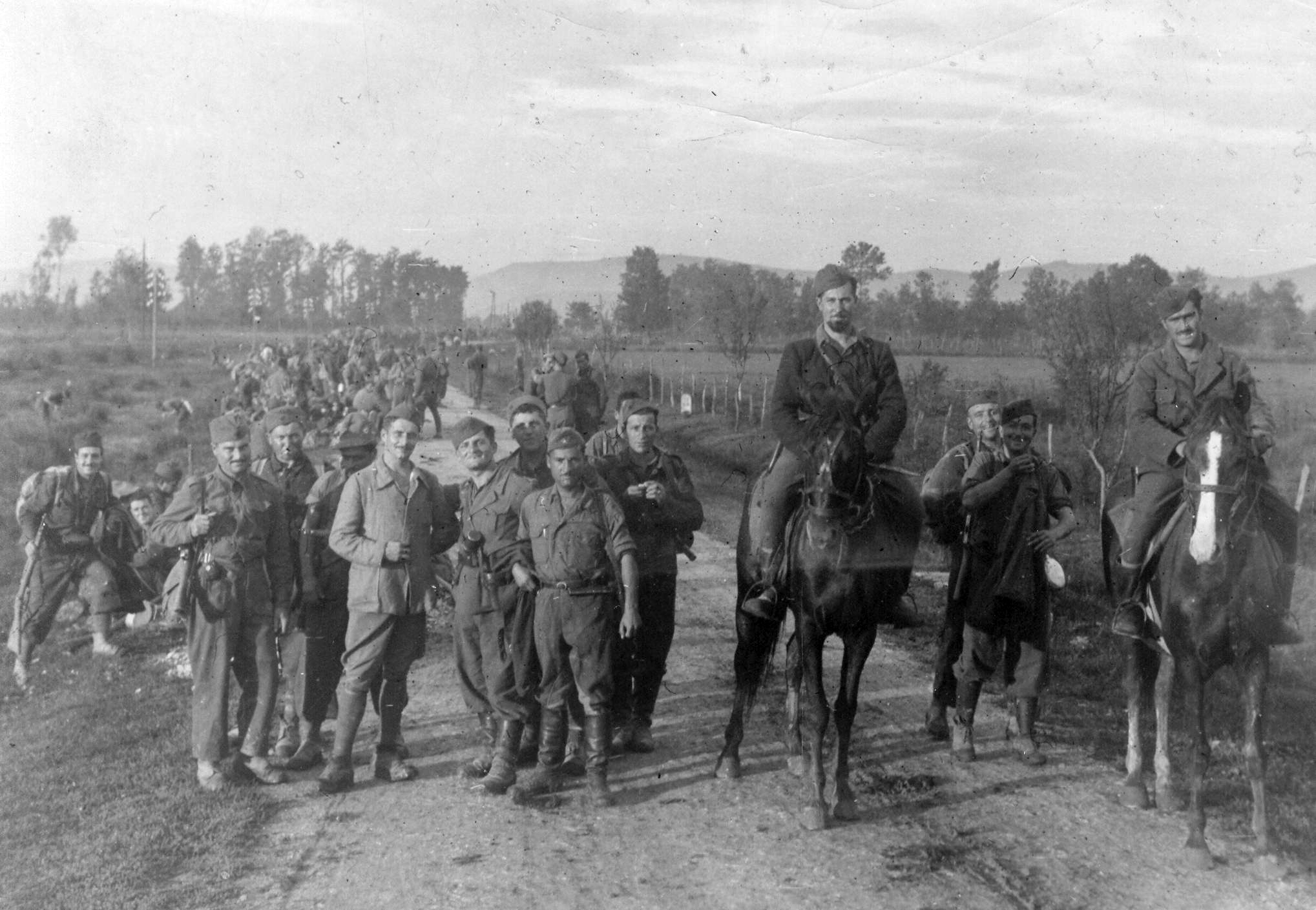
Garibaldi partisans in Yugoslavia in 1944

After the Armistice of Cassibile was announced on 8 September 1943, the German 118th Jäger Division and Yugoslav Chetniks demanded the Venezia disarm, but both were refused. While the 383rd Infantry Regiment "Venezia" in Tirana was quickly forced to surrender by invading German forces, the Venezia's commander General Giovanni Battista Oxilia was able to consolidate his forces at Berane and maintain discipline. On 10 October the division entered the 2nd Corps of Tito's National Liberation Army and on 13 October 1943 the division began an offensive against Wehrmacht forces in Brodarevo, Murina, Berane and Kolašin. The new situation required that the division be split in smaller units and so six brigades were formed, each one centered around one of the brigade's infantry battalions:

- 19th Infantry Division "Venezia"
  - I Brigade "Venezia" (I Battalion/ 83rd Infantry Regiment "Venezia")
  - II Brigade "Venezia" (II Battalion/ 83rd Infantry Regiment "Venezia")
  - III Brigade "Venezia" (III Battalion/ 83rd Infantry Regiment "Venezia")
  - IV Brigade "Venezia" (I Battalion/ 84th Infantry Regiment "Venezia")
  - V Brigade "Venezia" (II Battalion/ 84th Infantry Regiment "Venezia")
  - VI Brigade "Venezia" (III Battalion/ 84th Infantry Regiment "Venezia")

On 2 December 1943 in Pljevlja the remaining Italian soldiers of the Venezia and 1st Alpine Division "Taurinense", together with remnants of the 155th Infantry Division "Emilia", approximately 16,000 men in total, were grouped together in the Division "Garibaldi". The division consisted of three brigades of 5,000 men each, with the remaining Italian troops, mostly artillery, signals, engineer, and medical specialists, becoming instructors.

- Division "Garibaldi"
  - I Brigade "Garibaldi" (Taurinense and Emilia personnel)
  - II Brigade "Garibaldi" (Venezia personnel)
  - III Brigade "Garibaldi" (Venezia personnel)

Integrated into the Partisan 2nd Corps the division fought in Yugoslavia until February 1945, when the remaining 3,800 troops were repatriated via the liberated Dubrovnik.

== Organization ==
19th Infantry Division "Venezia" organization in 1940

- 19th Infantry Division "Venezia", in Florence
  - Headquarters
    - Command Company
    - 258th Carabinieri Section
    - 259th Carabinieri Section
    - 99th Field Post Office
    - 19th Infantry Division Command Transport Squad
  - 83rd Infantry Regiment "Venezia", in Pistoia
    - Command Company
    - 3 × Fusilier battalions
    - Support Weapons Battery (65/17 mod. 13 infantry support guns)
    - Mortar Company (81mm mod. 35 mortars)
  - 84th Infantry Regiment "Venezia", in Florence
    - Command Company
    - 3 × Fusilier battalions
    - Support Weapons Battery (65/17 mod. 13 infantry support guns)
    - Mortar Company (81mm mod. 35 mortars)
  - 383rd Infantry Regiment "Venezia" (formed on 1 December 1941 by renaming the 235th Infantry Regiment "Piceno")
    - Command Company
    - 3 × Fusilier battalions
    - Cannons Company (47/32 mod. 35 anti-tank guns)
    - Mortar Company (81mm mod. 35 mortars)
  - 19th Artillery Regiment "Venezia", in Florence
    - Command Unit
    - I Group (100/17 mod. 16 howitzers; transferred from the 14th Artillery Regiment "Ferrara" in July 1940)
    - II Group (75/18 mod. 34 howitzers)
    - III Group (75/13 mod. 15 mountain guns)
    - IV Group (100/17 mod. 14 howitzers; transferred in May 1942 to the 159th Artillery Regiment "Veneto")
    - 1 × Anti-aircraft battery (20/65 mod. 35 anti-aircraft guns)
    - Ammunition and Supply Unit
  - XIX Mortar Battalion (81mm mod. 35 mortars)
  - 19th Anti-tank Company (47/32 mod. 35 anti-tank guns)
  - 19th Telegraph and Radio Operators Company
  - 76th Engineer Company
  - 42nd Medical Section
    - 3 × Field hospitals
    - 1 × Surgical Unit
  - 19th Autocarrette Section
  - 38th Supply Section
  - 1 × Transport Section

Attached from 1941:

- 72nd CC.NN. Legion "Luigi Farini", in Florence
  - Command Company
  - LXXII CC.NN. Battalion
  - CXI CC.NN. Battalion
  - 72nd CC.NN. Machine Gun Company

== Military honors ==
For their conduct after the announcement of the Armistice of Cassibile the President of Italy awarded on 15 March 1950 to the regiments of the 19th Infantry Division "Venezia" Italy's highest military honor, the Gold Medal of Military Valor.

- 83rd Infantry Regiment "Venezia" on 15 March 1950
- 84th Infantry Regiment "Venezia" on 15 March 1950
- 19th Artillery Regiment "Venezia" on 15 March 1950

== Commanding officers ==
The division's commanding officers were:

- Generale di Divisione Enrico Pitassi Mannella (1938 - 9 June 1940)
- Generale di Divisione Silvio Bonini (10 June 1940 - 5 May 1943)
- Generale di Divisione Giovanni Battista Oxilia (6 May 1943 - 2 December 1943)

== CROWCASS ==
The names of twelve men attached to the division can be found in the Central Registry of War Criminals and Security Suspects (CROWCASS) set up by the Anglo-American Supreme Headquarters Allied Expeditionary Force in 1945. The names can be found at: Central Registry of War Criminals and Security Suspects from the Kingdom of Italy.
