= 84th Infantry Regiment "Venezia" =

Inactive Italian Army infantry unit

- 84° Reggimento Fanteria "Venezia"
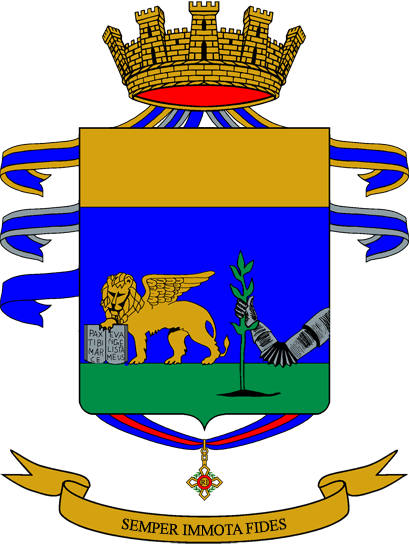
- Regimental coat of arms
- Active: 1 Nov. 1884 – 1 Dec 1943; 1 July 1958 – 9 Nov. 2000
- Country: Italy
- Branch: Italian Army
- Garrison/HQ: Falconara Marittima
- Motto: "Semper immota fides"
- Anniversaries: 26 October 1911 – Battle of Bu Meliana
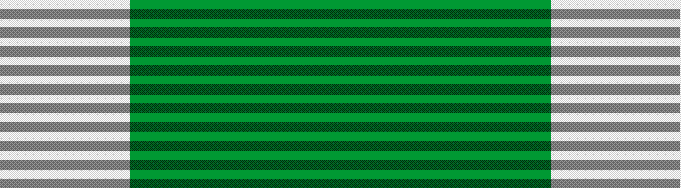
- Decorations: 2× Military Order of Italy; 2× Gold Medals of Military Valor; 2× Silver Medals of Military Valor; 1× Bronze Medal of Military Valor; 1× Gold Medal of Merit

Insignia
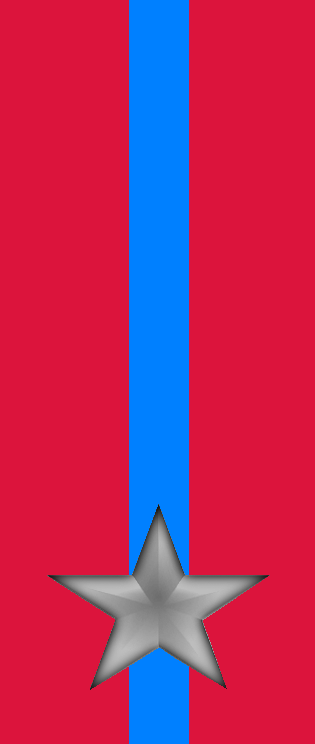
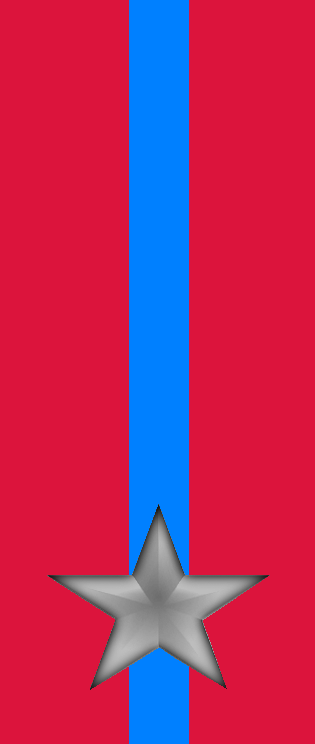
- Regimental gorget patches

The 84th Infantry Regiment "Venezia" (Italian: 84° Reggimento Fanteria "Venezia") is an inactive unit of the Italian Army last based in Falconara Marittima. The regiment is named for the city of Venice and part of the Italian Army's infantry arm.

The regiment was one of sixteen infantry regiments formed on 1 November 1884. In 1911–12 the regiment participated in the Italo-Turkish War and during World War I the regiment fought on the Italian front. In 1935–36 the regiment participated in the Second Italo-Ethiopian War and in 1939 in the Italian invasion of Albania. During World War II the regiment was assigned to the 19th Infantry Division "Venezia", with which it participated in the Greco-Italian War. Afterwards the division was on occupation duty in Montenegro, where the division was informed of the Armistice of Cassibile on 8 September 1943. The Venezia division refused German demands to surrender and joined the Yugoslav National Liberation Army instead. From 13 October 1943 the division fought against German forces and in December 1943 its personnel entered the Partisan Division "Garibaldi". For its conduct in Montenegro after the announcement of the Armistice of Cassibile the regiment was awarded Italy's highest military honor the Gold Medal of Military Valor. In 1958 the regiment was reformed as a training unit, which was reduced to a battalion sized unit in 1973. In 2000 the 84th Battalion "Venezia" was disbanded.

== History ==
=== Formation ===
On 1 November 1884 the 84th Infantry Regiment (Brigade "Venezia") was formed in Alessandria with companies ceded by the 2nd Infantry Regiment (Brigade "Re"), 22nd Infantry Regiment (Brigade "Cremona"), 30th Infantry Regiment (Brigade "Pisa"), 62nd Infantry Regiment (Brigade "Sicilia"), and 78th Infantry Regiment (Brigade "Toscana"). On the same day the 83rd Infantry Regiment (Brigade "Venezia") was formed in Alessandria with companies ceded by the 1st Infantry Regiment (Brigade "Re"), 21st Infantry Regiment (Brigade "Cremona"), 29th Infantry Regiment (Brigade "Pisa"), 61st Infantry Regiment (Brigade "Sicilia"), and 77th Infantry Regiment (Brigade "Toscana"). Both regiments consisted of a staff and three battalions, with four companies per battalion. Together the two regiments formed the Brigade "Venezia".

In 1895–96 the regiment provided eleven officers and 239 enlisted for units deployed to Italian Eritrea for the First Italo-Ethiopian War. In December 1908, the regiment was deployed to the area of the Strait of Messina for the recovery efforts after the 1908 Messina earthquake. For its service the regiment was awarded a Gold Medal of Merit, which was affixed to the regiment's flag.

=== Italo-Turkish War ===
In 1911 the regiment was deployed to Libya for the Italo-Turkish War. On 23 October 1911 the regiment fought in the Battle of Shar al-Shatt. Three days later the regiment withstood a ferocious Turkish attack at Bu Meliana near Tripoli, for which it was awarded a Gold Medal of Military Valor. On 4 December of the same year the regiment fought in the Battle of Ain Zara. In 1912 the regiment fought in the Battles of Zanzur.

=== World War I ===
At the outbreak of World War I, the Brigade "Venezia" formed, together with the Brigade "Ancona" and the 19th Field Artillery Regiment, the 15th Division. At the time the 84th Infantry Regiment consisted of three battalions, each of which fielded four fusilier companies and one machine gun section. After Italy's entry into the war on 23 May 1915 the Brigade "Venezia" was deployed to the Italian front: in 1915 the regiment operated against Austro-Hungarian forces in the Valsugana valley and on the slopes of Monte Salubio. On 12 December 1915 the regimental depot of the 84th Infantry Regiment in Florence formed the command of the Brigade "Arno" and the 213th Infantry Regiment (Brigade "Arno"). In 1916 the regiment operated on Monte Sant' Osvaldo near Roncegno and then on the slopes of Cimon Rava. On 18 May 1916 the depot of the 84th Infantry Regiment formed the command of the 226th Infantry Regiment (Brigade "Arezzo").

On 20 May 1917 the depot of the 84th Infantry Regiment formed the 268th Infantry Regiment (Brigade "Caserta"). In September 1917 the brigade was transferred to the Banjšice plateau where the it fought in the Eleventh Battle of the Isonzo in the area of Madoni. For their conduct during the Eleventh Battle of the Isonzo the two regiments of the Brigade "Venezia" were both awarded a Silver Medal of Military Valor. In October 1917 the regiment fought in the Battle of Caporetto near Plave and then, after the order to retreat to the Piave river had been given, the regiment fought a delaying action near Galleriano. In 1918 the brigade was deployed on Monte Zugna.

=== Interwar years ===
On 10 November 1926 the Brigade "Venezia" was renamed XIX Infantry Brigade. The brigade was the infantry component of the 19th Territorial Division of Florence. On the same date the brigade's two infantry regiments were renamed 83rd Infantry Regiment "Venezia" respectively 84th Infantry Regiment "Venezia". The XIX Infantry Brigade also included the 70th Infantry Regiment "Ancona" from the disbanded Brigade "Ancona". In 1934 the 19th Territorial Division of Florence was renamed 19th Infantry Division "Gavinana". A name change that also extended to the division's infantry brigade.

=== Second Italo-Ethiopian War ===
In 1935–36 the 19th Infantry Division "Gavinana", including the 84th Infantry Regiment "Venezia", participated in the Second Italo-Ethiopian War. Together with the 24th Infantry Division "Gran Sasso" the Gavinana operated in the Tigray Region. On 3–6 October 1935 the "Gavinana" division conquered Adwa. In March 1936 the division fought in the Battle of Shire and then in the Second Battle of Tembien. For its conduct during the war the 84th Infantry Regiment "Venezia" was awarded a Bronze Medal of Military Valor, which was affixed to the regiment's flag and added to the regiment's coat of arms. During the regiment's deployment the regimental depot in Florence formed on 10 March 1935 the 213th Infantry Regiment "Arno" as replacement. The 213th Arno was assigned to the CXIX Infantry Brigade "Gavinana II". After the 84th Infantry Regiment "Venezia" returned from Ethiopia the 213th Infantry Regiment "Arno" was disbanded on 30 September 1936 and its personnel integrated into the 84th Venezia.

On 15 April 1939 the XIX Infantry Brigade "Gavinana" was disbanded and the 19th Infantry Division "Gavinana" was renamed 19th Infantry Division "Venezia". The same month the division was mobilized for the invasion of Albania, landing in Durrës in Albania on 25–30 April 1939 and then occupying Elbasan and Pogradec to the East of Tirana. On 15 September 1939 the regimental depot of the 84th Infantry Regiment "Venezia" in Florence formed the 128th Infantry Regiment "Firenze" for the 41st Infantry Division "Firenze", as replacement for the regiment, as the Venezia division was to be based permanently in the Italian protectorate of Albania.

=== World War II ===
At the outbreak of World War II the regiment consisted of a command, a command company, three fusilier battalions, a support weapons battery equipped with 65/17 infantry support guns, and a mortar company equipped with 81mm Mod. 35 mortars.

The division participated in the Greco-Italian War, during which both regiments of the division were awarded a Silver Medal of Military Valor. After the Invasion of Yugoslavia in April 1941 the division moved to Podgorica in Montenegro and then in August to Berane in the Montenegrin Sandžak on anti-partisan duty.

After the announcement of the Armistice of Cassibile on 8 September 1943, the German 118th Jäger Division and Yugoslav Chetniks demanded the Venezia disarm, but both were refused. The Venezia assembled at Berane and on 10 October the division entered the 2nd Corps of Tito's National Liberation Army. On 13 October 1943 the division began an offensive against Wehrmacht forces in Brodarevo, Murina, Berane and Kolašin.

On 1 December the regiments of the Venezia division were disbanded and the next day the remaining soldiers of the Venezia, the 1st Alpine Division "Taurinense", and the 155th Infantry Division "Emilia", approximately 16,000 men in total, were grouped together in Pljevlja in the Division "Garibaldi". In February 1945 the remaining 3,800 troops were repatriated to Italy via the liberated Dubrovnik. For fighting against the Germans in Montenegro and the Sandžak the regiments of the Venezia division were awarded a Gold Medal of Military Valor.

=== Cold War ===
On 1 July 1958 the 84th Infantry Regiment "Venezia" was reformed by renaming the existing 7th Recruits Training Center in Siena. The regiment consisted of the following units:

- 84th Infantry Regiment "Venezia", in Siena
  - Command and Services Company, in Siena
  - I Battalion, in Siena
  - II Battalion, in Pistoia
  - III Battalion, in Arezzo

During the 1975 army reform the army disbanded the regimental level and newly independent battalions were granted for the first time their own flags. On 31 October 1973 the 84th Infantry Regiment "Venezia" in Siena was disbanded and reduced to Recruits Training Battalion "Venezia" with four recruits companies in Siena and one recruits company in Arezzo. On 15 November 1975 the Recruits Training Battalion "Venezia" in Siena was renamed 84th Infantry Battalion "Venezia" and assigned the flag and traditions of the 84th Infantry Regiment "Venezia". The next day, on 16 November 1975, the detached company in Arezzo became an autonomous unit and was renamed 225th Infantry Battalion "Arezzo".

The 84th Infantry Battalion "Venezia" was assigned to the Tuscan-Emilian Military Region and consisted of a command, a command platoon, and four recruits companies. In 1977 the battalion moved from Siena to Falconara Marittima and assigned to the Central Military Region. In 1987 the command platoon was increased to command and services company.

=== Recent times ===
In 1993 the battalion was renamed 84th Battalion "Venezia" and assigned to the Cavalry Brigade "Pozzuolo del Friuli". In January 1997 battalion was assigned to the Anti-aircraft Artillery Command. On 9 November 2000 the battalion was disbanded and the flag of the 84th Infantry Regiment "Venezia" was transferred to the Shrine of the Flags in the Vittoriano in Rome.
