= Laura Orvieto =

Jewish Italian writer, intellectual and women's rights activist

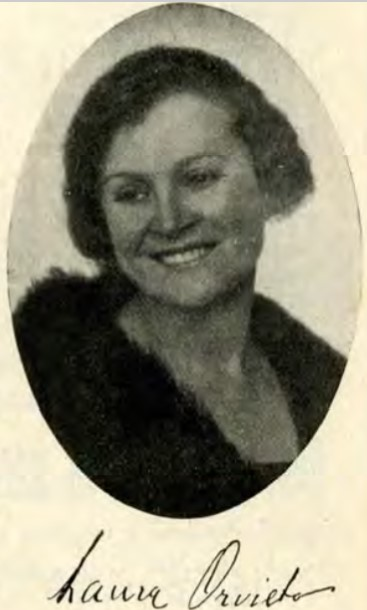
Laura Orvieto, Italian writer

Laura Orvieto, born Laura Cantoni (7 March 1876 - 9 May 1953) was a Jewish Italian writer, intellectual and women's rights activist. Many of her most known works were written for children to teach them ancient Greek and Roman myths.

== Early life and education ==
Laura Cantoni was born on 7 March 1867, in Milan, daughter of Achille Cantoni and Maria Cantoni. The family was Jewish and her father, who was originally from Mantua, was a banker, a collector of antiquities, and an expert on Islamic art and history. She was descended of Abramo Errera, a Venetian legislator and banker, who had worked to create socio-political equality for the Jewish community of Venice when it was freed from Austrian rule. She attended a girls' school which provided her with the traditional superficial education given to middle-class girls of her era. As a teenager, her parents hired a Scottish tutor, Lily Marshall, who introduced Cantoni to English literature as well as the social issues that were the focus of women's rights organizations.

Cantoni became committed to women's issues and befriended women like teachers and writers Rosa Errera and Lina Schwartz. She volunteered as a teacher at the Associazione Scuola e Famiglia (School and Family Association), an organization founded by the sisters Paola and Gina Lombroso as an after-school program and nursery for working-class mothers and supported by the Unione Femminile Nazionale (National Women's Union). Her work at the association often involved telling stories to children and she became adept at inventing impromptu narratives by merging plots from various fairy tales with her own imagination. She moved to Florence in 1899, after marrying poet Angiolo Orvieto. Having insufficient intellectual stimuli after giving birth to Leonfrancesco in 1900 and Annalia in 1903, she was encouraged to write by her husband.

== Career ==
Orvieto began collaborating with the magazine "Il Marzocco" under the name of "Mrs. El". The pseudonym was necessary because many of the articles she wrote addressed taboo topics like gender relationships, women's labor problems, and rights for women to have education and be politically engaged. In 1909, she published her first book, Leo and Lia and two years later Storie della storia del mondo ("Stories of World History"), which would become her most known work. Several of her books for children were translated into other languages and had multiple editions. She was a friend of the Italian writer Amelia Pincherle Rosselli and of the actress Eleonora Duse, who she met through the Florentine Lyceum. Lyceum clubs were organized throughout Europe as professional networking organizations for women. Membership was limited to women who had university qualifications or had published original art, music, writing, or scientific works. She joined the Florentine branch of the Consiglio Nazionale delle Donne Italiane (CNDI), (National Council of Italian Women) and became friends with Bice Cammeo, Ernestina Paper and Mary Nathan Puritz. During World War I, she worked as a volunteer nurse, which inspired her to write a biography of Florence Nightingale.

Initially when the fascist regime came to power in Italy, Orvieto's work was not overly impacted. But beginning in 1929, her publisher Enrico Bemporad required that she make significant changes for new works and new editions, omitting references to Jews. Bemporad was Jewish, but an agreement between the fascist state and the Catholic Church meant that libraries and schools could no longer carry works in which Jews were protagonists. Introduction of the Italian racial laws and legislation restricting women's right to work in 1938, further curtailed her activities. Those statutes required Jews to be expelled from various clubs, and officially women were excluded from working or contributing to culture or social services as volunteers. During this time, she intentionally focused on Jewish topics, writing an autobiography and an unpublished novel, Leone Da Rimini. Between 1943 and 1945, Orvieto and Angiolo went into hiding, living in an elder care home in Mugello. When the war ended, she founded a children's journal, La settimana dei ragazzi (The Children's Week), which she operated until 1947.

Some of her books were illustrated by Ezio Anichini's Art Nouveau lithographies.

== Death and legacy ==
Orvieto died on 9 March 1953, in Florence. She is most remembered for her series of works on the myths of the Greeks and Romans, writing the stories in clear plain language directed at children.

== Selected works ==
- Leo e Lia (1909, short story collection)
- Storie della storia del mondo. Greche e barbare (1911)
- Principesse, bambini e bestie (1914)
- Storie della storia del mondo. Il natale di Roma (1928)
- Storie della storia del mondo. La forza di Roma (1933)
- Storie di bambini molto antichi (1937)
- Storia di Angiolo e Laura (1939, ed. in 2001)
- Viaggio meraviglioso di Gianni nel paese delle parole (1930, ed. in 2007)
