= Daisy di Robilant =

Italian noblewoman, fascist and feminist (1870–1933)

Countess Daisy di Robilant
- Born: Margherita Francesetti di Malgrà; 1870
- Died: 1933
- Employer: Opera Nazionale ed Maternita ed Infanzia
- Organization(s): Consiglio Nazionale delle Donne Italiane, International Council of Women
- Title: Contessa di Malgrà, Contessa di Robilant
- Political party: National Fascist Party
- Spouse: Mario Nicolis di Robilant
- Children: 4, including Irene di Robilant
- Parents: Count Manfredi Francesetti di Hautecour; Natalia Morozzo della Rocca

Contessa Daisy di Robilant (1870–1933) was an Italian noblewoman, fascist, feminist and campaigner for children's and women's rights. She campaigned for legislation that would protect unwed mothers and their children, women's suffrage and welfare reforms, as well as becoming a spokeswomen for the early fascist regime.

== Activism ==
Di Robilant was founder and president of the National Mothers' Aid Society, which provided temporary shelter for homeless single mothers and their children. She was also a member of the International Child Welfare Committee. In the 1910s and 1920s, she lobbied Italian governments for legislation that would protect unwed mothers and their children and wanted single women with children to not be seen as "fallen women" by society.

When Benito Mussolini took power as totalitarian dictator of Italy in 1922, di Robilant became a supporter of his fascist regime. She approved of the health and welfare reforms introduced by Mussolini, including the prevention of illegal abortions to increase the national birth rate. She served as an spokeswoman for Fascist Italy at international events and oversaw the government's experimental social programmes.

Di Robilant campaigned for women's suffrage in Italy and was a leader of the Pro-Suffrage Alliance in Italy (also known as the International Woman Suffrage Alliance) from 1923.

In 1931, di Robilant was appointed convener (presiding officer) of the Consiglio Nazionale delle Donne Italiane (CNDI, National Council of Italian Women), the Italian branch of the International Council of Women, by the fascist government. She succeeded Gabriella Rasponi Spalletti. While di Robilant served as leader, the CNDI worked on the causes of infant mortality and failure to thrive, the social problem of child abandonment, public welfare programmes, the provision of playgrounds and the effects of rheumatism on children. The council also provided free legal advice for women.

Di Robilant abandoned fascism over women's suffrage being denied under Mussolini's regime.

== Personal life ==
Daisy di Robilant was born Margherita Francesetti di Malgrà in April 1870 to Count Manfredi Francesetti di Hautecour and Natalia Morozzo della Rocca, both from wealthy Piedmontese families. Her parents were married in 1869 and had two other children: Clothilde (known as Hilda, born in 1872) and Ugo (born in 1877). Initially, it was a love marriage but, by the late 1870s, di Robilant's mother went on to fall in love with Sidney Sonnino (a politician) and the two had an affair.

She married General Mario Nicholas di Robilant, who commanded the Fourth Army of the Kingdom of Italy. They had two daughters: Irene di Robilant, who became a journalist; and Maria Luisa di Robilant, who married World War I flying ace Count Flaminio Avet in 1925.

In 1924, di Robilant was visiting her daughter Irene in New York, United States, and was reportedly robbed. Irene provided details to the New York Times in 1924 when the paper reported that, while in New York, di Robilant had been the victim of a robbery. According to the report, two men stole over $50,000 worth of jewels from her, allegedly including a diamond necklace "presented by Napoleon to his sister". In the 1942 Almanac of Italian Women, Irene was described as a "contributor to American newspapers".

In 1897, Italian painter Giacomo Grosso painted a portrait of di Robilant, Ritratto della contessa Daisy de Robilant Francesetti di Malgrà, which nows hangs in the Galleria Nazionale d'Arte Moderna in Rome.

Di Robilant died in 1933.
