= Errera =

Errera may refer to:

== People ==
- Alberto Errera (1913–1944), Greek-Jewish officer and member of the anti-Nazi resistance
- Alfred Errera (1886–1960), Belgian mathematician
- Emilia Errera (1866–1901), Italian teacher and writer
- Gérard Errera (born 1943), French diplomat
- Isabelle Errera, née Goldschmidt (1869–1929), Belgian art historian specializing in textiles
- Jacques Errera (1896–1977), Belgian physicochemist
- Léo Errera (1858–1905), Belgian botanist
- Nicolas Errèra (1967), French musician and composer
- Rosa Errera (1864–1946), Italian writer, translator, and teacher

== Toponyms ==
- Cape Errera, cape which forms the southwest end of Wiencke Island, in the Palmer Archipelago
- Errera Channel, channel between Rongé Island and the west coast of Graham Land

== Other ==
- Errera graph, in the mathematical field of graph theory, graph discovered by Alfred Errera
