= Rasponi =

Rasponi is a surname. Notable people with the surname include:

- Eugenia Rasponi (1873–1958), Italian noblewoman, suffragist, and businesswoman
- Gabriella Rasponi Spalletti, Italian feminist, educator, and philanthropist
- Giovanni Rasponi (1646–1714), Italian Roman Catholic prelate
- Lanfranco Rasponi (1914–1983), Italian author, critic, and publicist
