= LGBTQ culture in Italy =

LGBTQ culture in Italy refers to the artistic display of sexual diversity and the lifestyle of people with non-traditional sexualities and genders in the Italian Republic.

== Cinema ==
Two of the most important directors of Italian cinema, Luchino Visconti and Pier Paolo Pasolini, were homosexual or bisexual. Luchino Visconti, an openly bisexual filmmaker, was one of the founders of Italian neorealism, which would later evolve into a niche and distinctly stylized form of cinema, frequently featuring homosexual characters and homoeroticism. His first film with homosexual undertones was Obsession (1943), in which he discreetly presented the loving relationship between two of the protagonists as an intense relationship. Other Visconti films with homosexual elements include Rocco and His Brothers (1963) or the more explicit The Damned (1969), a historical reconstruction of the Night of the Long Knives. Perhaps his most emblematic film was Death in Venice (1971), a cinematic adaption of the novel by Thomas Mann, in which a music composer, inspired by Gustav Mahler and obsessed with beauty and perfection, falls in love with a young Italian man.

Homosexuality was also a key influence in the productions of Pier Paolo Pasolini, who politicized the concept in antithesis to the bourgeois way of life. In his own words, he conceived his feature film Teorema (1968), in which all the members of a family fall in love with a character played by Terence Stamp, as "a religious story, a god who comes to a bourgeois family; beautiful, young, fascinating, angel and/or demon." His Trilogy of Life, which included The Decameron (1971), The Canterbury Tales (1972) and Arabian Nights (1974), he adapted classical texts using elements of explicit intercourse and fascist politics to show domination through eroticism. In his final and most controversial film, Salò, or the 120 days of Sodom (1975), released two weeks before his death, he fused Mussolini's fascist Italy with the philosophy of the Marquis de Sade, depicting graphic scenes of rape, sexual humiliation, coprophagy and torture.

While Visconti and Pasolini have made homosexuality a prominent feature of their curriculum vitae, other gay directors such as Franco Zeffirelli and Bernardo Bertolucci have been more covert. Among Bertolucci's films, his most openly homosexual was The Conformist (1970), in which a gay man renounces his sexuality during Mussolini's dictatorship, marrying a woman and joining the Fascist Party in an attempt to appear heterosexual. Set in the same period, Ettore Scola's A Special Day (1977) depicts the friendship between a woman played by Sophia Loren who is married to a fanatical and authoritarian member of the Fascist Party, and a homosexual played by Marcello Mastroianni who represents a foil to her husband.

In 1986, Ottavio Mai and Giovanni Minerba founded the Torino International Gay and Lesbian Film Festival, which has since been celebrated annually in Turin.

== Literature ==
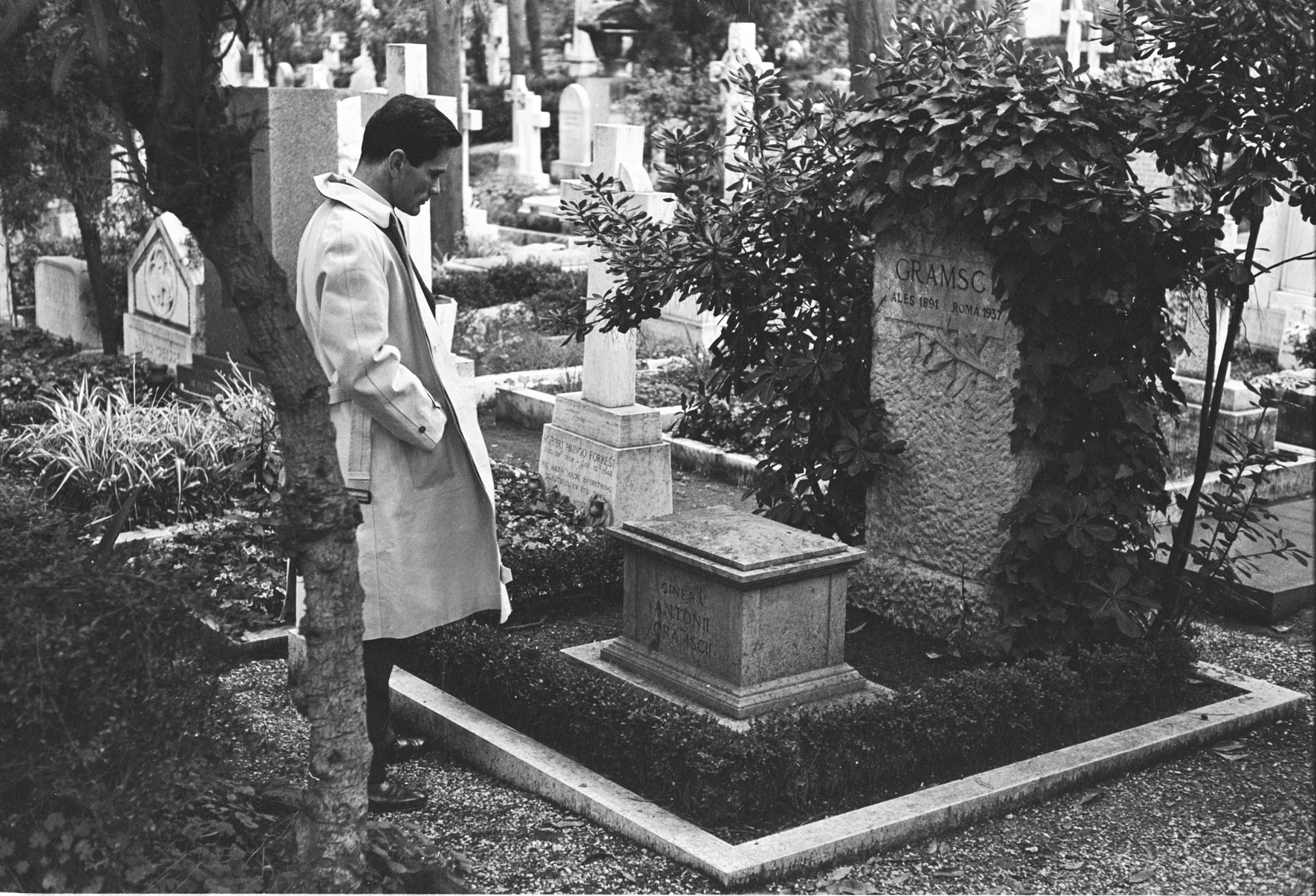
Pasolini, a prominent Italian gay writer, at Gramsci's grave.

Various Italian gay authors of the early 20th century, including Umberto Saba, Carlo Emilio Gadda, Sandro Penna, Mario Soldati and Piero Santi, preferred to keep homosexuality a private matter and did not reflect it in their works. Those who dared to address the subject censored their own works or wrote them down never to be published. Examples include Aldo Palazzeschi, preferred to keep homosexuality a private matter and not to reflect it in their works. Those who dared to address the subject censored their own works or wrote them down never to be published. Examples include Aldo Palazzeschi, who published Reflections in 1908. The book was later reissued under the title Allegoria di novembre, toning down the homosexual content. His later work Interrogation of the Countess Maria was not published until fourteen years after his death. In the 1930s, Giovanni Comisso wrote Gioco d'infanzia (Childhood Game), an expurgated version of which was published in 1965. The original version was only discovered in 1994. Luigi Settembrini's novel The Neoplatonists, disguised as a translation from ancient Greek and written in the 1930s, was only published in 1977.

One of the first Italian novels to feature lesbian content was Sibilla Aleramo's The Passage (1919), in which she recounted her relationship with Lina Poletti, with whom she was romantically involved for about a year. Another of her works, Andando e stando (1921), describes the lesbian scene in Paris and Natalie Clifford Barney's salon.

== Fashion ==
Valentino and his partner Giancarlo Giammetti run one of the most prestigious fashion houses in the world. Giorgio Armani, another of the world's great couturiers and designers, is Italy's most commercially successful designer.

== Music ==
Tiziano Ferro, one of the most prominent Italian figures to publicly discuss his homosexuality, did so in Vanity Fair magazine on October 6, 2010. Renato Zero is also a prominent gay musician.

In 2009, singer-songwriter Povia's song Luca was gay, widely considered a homophobic work, won second prize at the Sanremo Festival by popular vote, as well as the radio and TV press room award. The song appears to refer to an "ex-gay" man named Luca Di Tolve and, according to statements by Aurelio Mancuso, president of Arcigay, "uses all the weapons of fundamentalist Catholic organizations. The song he will present in San Remo, regardless of the sugary words he may have chosen, is the political manifesto of a religious movement that has been repeatedly disproven by science." The Sicilian rapper Salmo, in the song Shit in the Head, states "If I had a gay son, I'd beat him up." In the ensuing scandal, Salmo responded with a statement on his Facebook page in which, among other homophobic remarks, he said that "often you are not simply gay by nature, but just perverted human beings in search of an alibi," a comment that was liked by thousands of internet users. After the scandal escalated, Salmo retracted his statement in an interview, stating that he has nothing "against homosexuals." Meanwhile, singers Laura Pausini, Giorgia, and Tiziano Ferro made statements in support of LGBT rights in 2012.

== Television ==
Rai 4 broadcasts the youth series Física o Química on its digital channel. One of the series' protagonists, Fer, is a homosexual teenager. The Catholic television viewers' group Aiart has demanded that the series be stopped from airing in Italy, which the network's director, Carlo Freccero, has refused.

The censure of homosexual topics in Italian television continues to be a contentious issue. In a December 2008 broadcast of the film Brokeback Mountain, featuring love between two men, three homosexual scenes were cut by the Italian network Rai Due, including two kisses between the protagonists, while other more explicit or violent heterosexual scenes were shown. Television director Claudio Petruccioli apologized for the "mistake," and Rai Due chief Antonio Marano announced that they would broadcast the full film after Christmas. In 2010, the network re-broadcast the censored version on its satellite channel. In 2011, Rai 1 television decided not to broadcast an episode of the German series Un ciclone in convento ("A cyclone in the convent"), which depicts a same-sex marriage taking place in a convent. In 2012, Berlusconi-owned Rete 4 censored scenes with homosexual content in the British series Downtown Abbey.
