= Luisa Giaconi =

Italian poet (1870–1908)

Luisa Giaconi (Florence, 18 June 1870 – Fiesole, 18 July 1908) was an Italian poet. Her work represents one of the most significant expressions of Italian symbolism in women's writing, projected towards the new sensibilities of the twentieth-century.

== Biography ==
Descendant of Baroness Schluga, who arrived in Tuscany following Maria Anna Carolina of Saxony (the first wife of Leopold II of Tuscany), Giaconi was born in Florence. However, she spent part of her youth moving from city to city following her father, a middle school mathematics teacher.

When her father died, she again moved to the capital of Tuscany, where she attended l’Accademia di Belle arti for six years, gaining the diploma with which she would make a living as a copyist at the Galleria degli Uffizi in Florence. She was a friend of Enrico Nencioni, her neighbor in via delle Caldaie in the Santo Spirito district, from whom she deepened her knowledge of English literature and was able to perfect the language. She had great admiration for the thought of Arthur Schopenhauer, whose works enjoyed renewed attention in the environment of Florentine aestheticism.

She published numerous poems in the periodical Il Marzocco, founded by Angiolo Orvieto; she hoped for a long time to be able to collect her verses from the publisher Paggi, whose bankruptcy in 1897 painfully broke her expectations. She had a long, passionate relationship with the journalist and professor of English literature Giuseppe Saverio Gargàno, one of the main collaborators of Il Marzocco, from 1899 until his death.

She spent the remaining years of her life in pain, caused by the tuberculosis that she had contracted at a very young age. She died at 38 in Fiesole. Her tomb, adorned with a rose plant, is located in the small cemetery of Settignano. The poems published in Il Marzocco were collected after her death in the volume Tebaide by Gargàno, who dedicated a long introduction to her and reviewed her verses in “Il Marzocco” along with those of the poet Gina Gennai.

== Poetic Production ==
Her poems, mainly in a symbolist style, appear to be influenced by Giovanni Pascoli’s poetry; both from the Primi poemetti as from the Poemi conviviali, from the Poema paradisiaco of Gabriele D’Annunzio and from the French symbolists. Giaconi's metric is particularly well-done, and she makes her own sophisticated innovations applied to a classical base. Her only poetry collection, Tebaide, was published posthumously in 1909, then re-edited with several additions in 1912. It is unclear if the title was suggested by Giaconi herself in life, or if it was taken from the title of the second poem of Gargàno's collection, referring to the place in which Coptic monasticism was developed and is a synonym for cenobium, a type of monastic community.

Her poetry represents one of the most interesting female testimonies of Italian Decadentism; moving from the symbolist experience, in which the influence of contemporary pictorial elements is present, towards suggestions of surrealism in the last part of Tebaide. Here, Giaconi focuses on the dream as a moment of experience in a different reality. In addition to the contrast between dream and reality, the principal themes of her works are made up of a desire for the infinite, the mysterious transformation of natural elements (such as the wind), the disquieting presence of death suggested in everyday life, as well as the passage towards a higher reality.

Her poetry especially struck Dino Campana, who proposed one of her most beautiful poems, Dianora, for publication to his own editor: this led to a misunderstanding in attribution that was only revealed several years later. In fact, Campana had not clearly indicated the author's name, but had only specified that she was a Florentine poet who died of tuberculosis at thirty years old: the editor thought that the poem was Campana's and that he was trying to pretend otherwise. This oversight was certainly helped along by the similarities between Giaconi's style and that of Campana.

== Works ==
- Tebaide, edited by G.S. Gargano, Bologna Zanichelli, 1909 and, with numerous additions, Bologna, Zanichelli, 1912

== Bibliography ==
- Natalia Costa-Zalessow, Scrittrici italiane dal XIII al XX secolo. Testi e critica, Ravenna, Longo, 1982
- Caterina Del Vivo, Luisa Giaconi. Otto poesie, una prosa, "Antologia Vieusseux", LXX, apr. - giu. 1983, pp. 54 – 64.
- Alfredo Luzi, Escursioni surrealiste nella poesia di Luisa Giaconi (1870 - 1908), "Ermeneutica letteraria", II, 2006, pp. 171 – 175.
- Luisa Giaconi, A fiore dell'ombra. Le poesie, le lettere, gli inediti, con un saggio critico di Manuela Brotto, Pistoia, Petite plaisance, 2009
