= First Battle of the Piave River =

1917 battle between Italy and Austro-Hungary

- Part of Italian front of the First World War
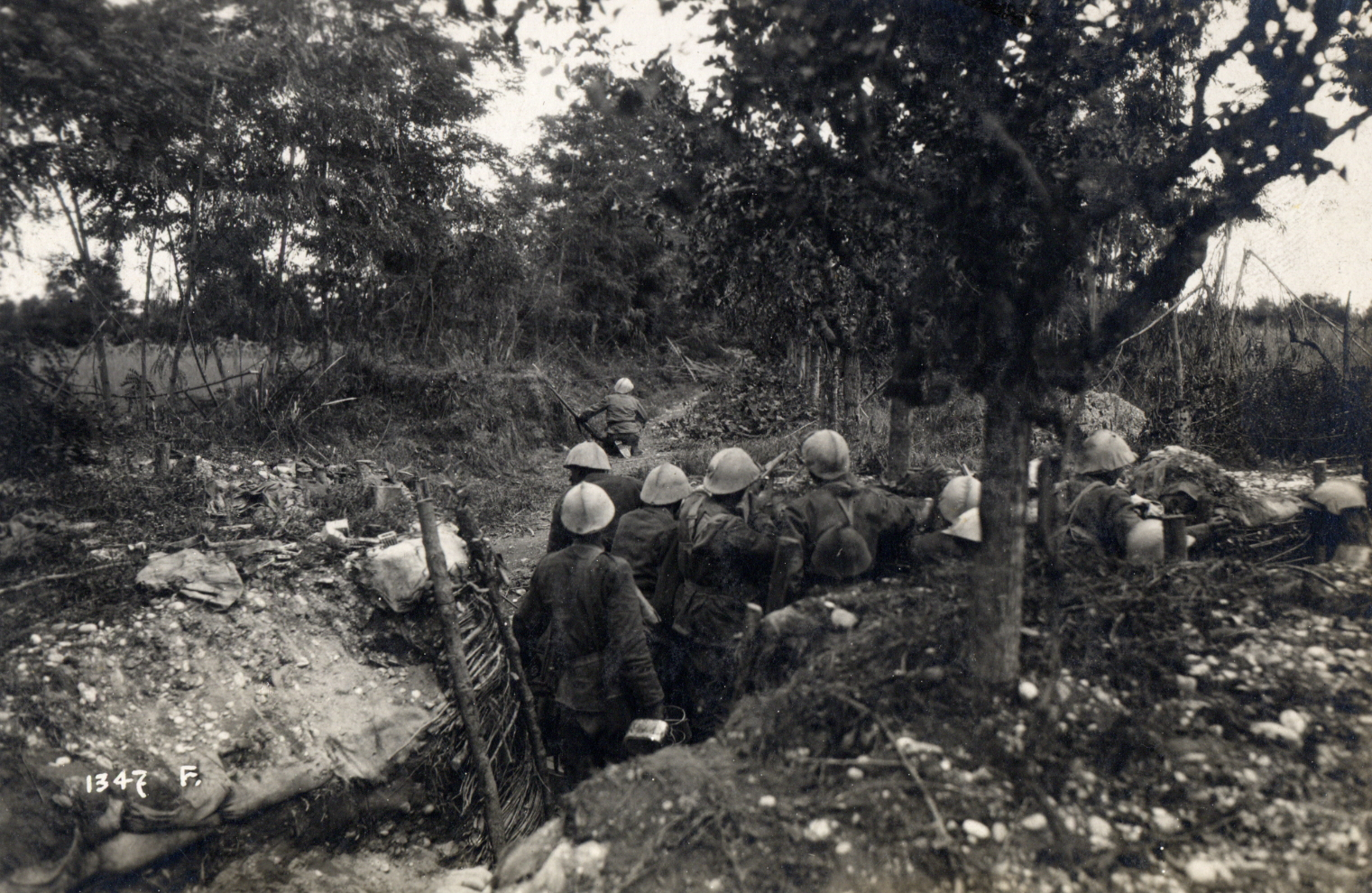
- Italian troops on the new Piave front
Date	November–December 1917
Location	Piave, Monte Grappa
Result	Italian victory: Stopping of the German-Austrian advance after the Battle of Caporetto

Belligerents
Austria-Hungary; Germany	Italy

Commanders and leaders
(German Empire) Otto von Below (Austria-Hungary) Archduke Eugen of Austria	(Kingdom of Italy) Armando Diaz (Kingdom of Italy) Mario Nicolis di Robilant

Strength
(German Empire) 14th Army (Austria-Hungary) 11th Army	(Kingdom of Italy) 4th Army

Casualties and losses
~21,000	~12,000

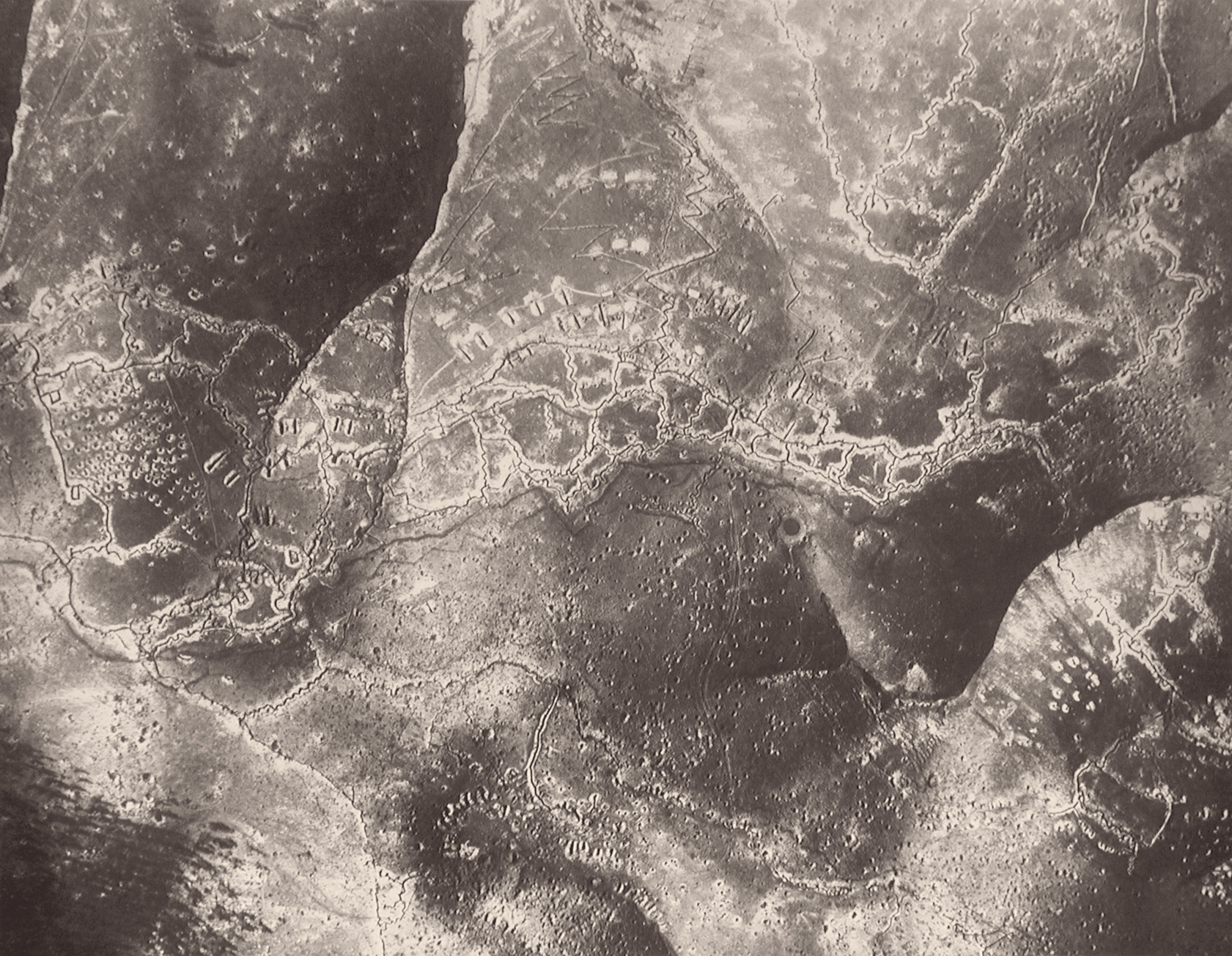
Austrian trenches on the Asolone flank of the Monte Grappa massif

The First Battle of the Piave River (Italian: Prima battaglia del Piave), or first battle of Monte Grappa, was fought during World War I between the Austro-German armies and the royal Italian army along the Piave river and in the area of Monte Grappa.

The Italian Army was in all-out retreat after the Austro-Hungarian autumn offensive of 1917. The Italian Chief of the general staff, general Luigi Cadorna, had ordered the construction of fortified defenses around the Monte Grappa summit in order to make the mountain range an impregnable fortress. When the Austro-Hungarian offensive routed the Italians, the new Italian chief of staff, Armando Diaz, ordered the Fourth Army to stop their retreat and defend these positions between the Roncone and the Tomatico mountains, with the support of the Second Army.

The Austro-Hungarians and the German Army's Alpenkorps, despite numerical superiority, failed to take the mountain's summit during the first battle of Monte Grappa, which lasted from November 11, 1917, to December 23, 1917. Armando Diaz allowed his local commanders much more freedom of manoeuvre than his predecessor, which resulted in a more elastic and effective Italian defense.

Thus the Italian front along the Piave river was stabilized and the Austro-Hungarians failed to enter the plains beyond and to take the city of Venice.

== See also ==
- Monte Grappa
- Second Battle of the Piave River
- Battle of Vittorio Veneto
