= Eugenia Rasponi =

Italian noblewoman, suffragist and businessperson

- Born: Eugenia Rasponi Murat; 18 September 1873; Ravenna, Kingdom of Italy
- Died: 1958 (aged 84–85)
- Occupations: furniture manufacturer, suffragist
- Partner: Cordula Poletti
- Father: Gioacchino Rasponi Murat
- Relatives: Marițica Bibescu (maternal grandmother); Giulio Rasponi (paternal grandfather); Gabriella Rasponi Spalletti (cousin)
- Family: Bonaparte family Ghica family Văcărescu family

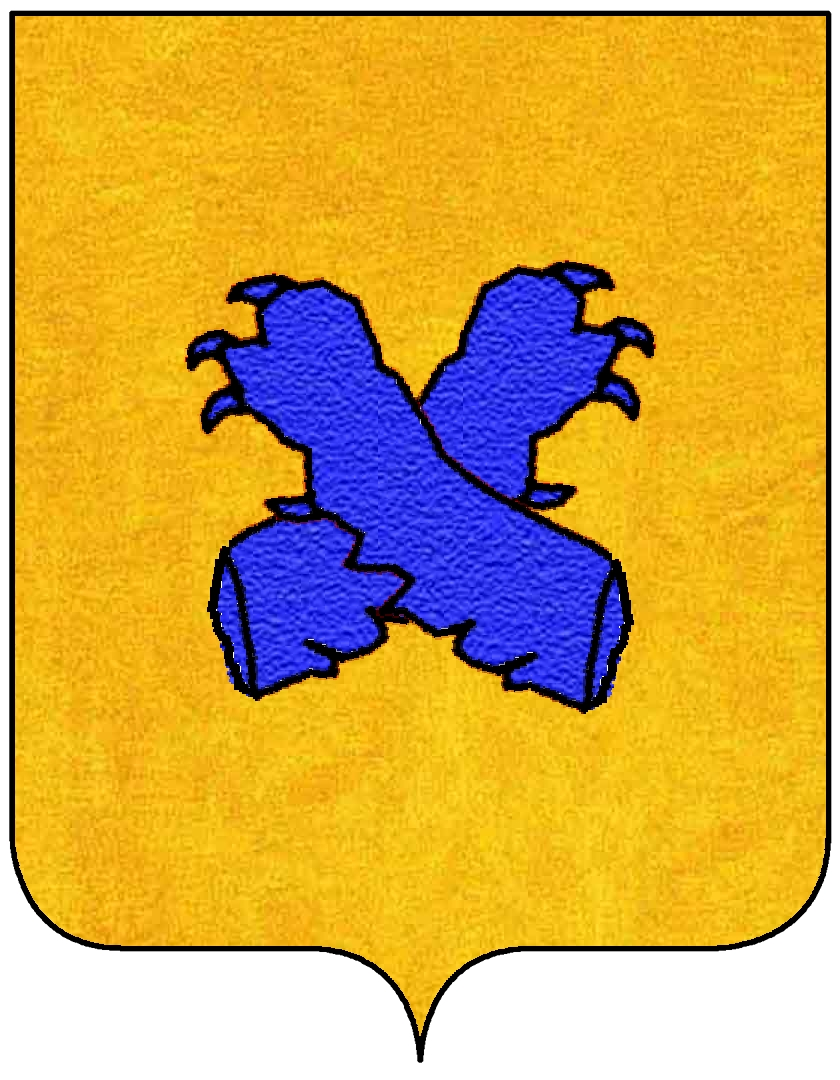
Coat of arms of the Rasponi family.

Eugenia Rasponi (18 September 1873–1958) was an Italian noblewoman who became a suffragist and businessperson. Dedicated to social welfare projects, as her mother had been, she opened a furniture manufacturing business to preserve the local hand-crafted canvases made in Romagna. In 1918, she met openly-lesbian writer and suffragist, Lina Poletti. The two women would share their lives for the next 40 years, traveling throughout Europe and Asia and studying philosophy and theosophy.

== Early life ==
Eugenia Rasponi Murat (Note: Eugenia is sometimes incorrectly identified as Eugenia Spalletti Rasponi and a sister of Gabriella Rasponi Spalletti. The women were actually cousins, as Gabriella was the daughter of Eugenia's father's sister Letizia Rasponi Murat and her husband, Cesare Rasponi Bonanzi. It may be that the confusion resulted from the fact that Eugenia never married and her estate was inherited by her cousin, Count Gian "Giovanni" Battista Spalletti Trivelli, son of Gabriella. She has also been identified as the niece of Luisa Giulia Murat, when in fact, she was Luisa's granddaughter.) was born on 18 September 1873 in Ravenna, in the Romagna region of the Kingdom of Italy to Princess Costanza (Constanța) Ghica and Gioacchino Rasponi Murat. She was the youngest of four surviving children. Her paternal grandparents were Count Giulio Rasponi and Princess Luisa Giulia Murat and her paternal great-grandparents were Joachim Murat, King of Naples and Caroline Bonaparte, sister of Napoleon. Her maternal grandparents were Maria Văcărescu and Costache Ghica of Wallachia, and her great grandfather was the poet Nicolae Văcărescu. Within a month of her birth, her parents moved from Ravenna to Palermo, where her father assumed the post of prefect. He died when she was four years old.

After her husband's death, Rasponi's mother returned to Ravenna and participated in social welfare programs. She was president of the Società Operaia Femminile (Female Worker's Society), which she helped found in 1880. In 1894, she led the drive for the creation of a committee of the Red Cross in Ravenna and became first president of the organization. She died the following year, having impressed upon her daughter the importance of humanitarian service.

== Career ==
In 1903, Rasponi purchased the castle fortress, known locally as the Castello Malatestiano, of Santarcangelo di Romagna, where she managed a furniture manufacturing facility. Interested in the local craft which produced hand-printed canvases, she purchased them as adornments for the castle and for use as the featured upholstery on her furniture. Rasponi became a prominent suffragist in Ravenna, and participated in the 1908 convention in Rome of the Consiglio Nazionale delle Donne Italiane (National Council of Italian Women, CNDI) led by her cousin, Gabriella Rasponi Spalletti. Around 1918, Rasponi met Cordula Poletti known as "Lina". Poletti was both a suffragist and openly lesbian. Sharing their hometown, their political views, and an appreciation of the arts, the two women became a couple. They lived in the Palazzo Rasponi Murat in Ravenna and in 1921 hosted the CNDI congress at the palace. The openness of Rasponi and Poletti's relationship was not accepted by the community and after the conference, the women decided to close the factory and move together to Rome.

In 1922, Poletti gave a large portion of the family heirlooms from the Napoleonic era to her cousin Count Gian Battista Spelletti. After a 30-year closure, she reopened the rooms in the Palazzo in Ravenna which housed the remainder of the museum-quality artifacts, which included portraits of King Murat and Caroline Bonaparte by François Gérard and numerous landscape paintings. She continued her activism in striving for equal rights of individuals, living with a group of similarly minded friends at her various residences. When in Rome, Rasponi and Poletti lived on Via Giovanni Battista Morgagni and became involved in several intellectual salons. They attended theosophical and philosophical meetings, which brought them to the attention of authorities. As a result, their home was repeatedly raided by the police. In one incident from 1937, they organized seminars for Jiddu Krishnamurti, an anti-fascist philosopher. He gave a series of presentations in February and March at Rasponi's home on spiritual matters and the police interrupted the meeting, accusing Krishnamurti of preparing political initiatives. Supporters of Krishnamurti wrote letters to the government expressing that Potetti and Rasponi fully supported the government and that Krishnamurti was apolitical. Eventually the charges were dropped. The couple traveled widely throughout Europe and Asia, making long study trips to gather anthropological and esoteric answers to existential dilemmas.

== Death and legacy ==
Rasponi died in 1958, having partnered with Poletti for 40 years. She is widely credited with rescuing the hand-painted canvas craft in Romagna from extinction. Having no children, Rasponi left her estate to her cousin, Count Gian "Giovanni" Battista Spalletti Trivelli, son of Gabriella. In turn the Rocca Malatestiana Santarcangelo was inherited by Princess Marina Colonna di Paliano, who restored and reopened it to the public in 2019. Her apartment in the Palazzo Rasponi Murat was preserved after her death as a museum and could be viewed by the public on appointment through 2012.
