= Aimé Dupont =

American sculptor and photographer (1839–1900)

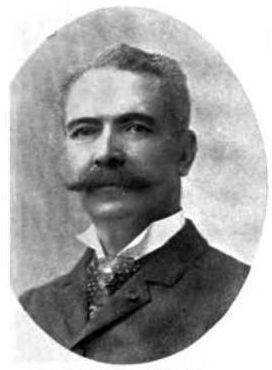
- Born: 6 December 1839; Ypres, Belgium
- Died: 16 February 1900 (aged 60); New York City, U.S
- Occupations: Photographer; sculptor

Aimé Dupont (6 December 1839 – 16 February 1900) was a Belgian-born American sculptor and photographer who was best known for his pictures of opera singers when he was the official photographer for the Metropolitan Opera in New York City.

== Early life ==
Dupont was born in Ypres, Belgium, the son of one of the city's leading photographers. He was educated at the School of Mines in Liège, where he learned how to quarry and polish stone for sculptures, as well as the technical process for creating photographic toning agents from minerals. After graduation, he moved to Paris, France, to work at Maison Walery as a photograph technician, but he sculpted in his free time. In the early 1870s, he decided to start his own photography and sculpting business on the Champs-Élysées. During this period, he married Etta Greer, an American woman who spent much of her girlhood in Paris.

He won some acclaim for both his arts, including a gold medal for photography in the Paris Exhibition of 1878. As a sculptor, he later was made a chevalier of the Legion d'honneur. One of his notable works was a bust of Elihu B. Washburne, who was the United States Ambassador to France during the Ulysses S. Grant administration.

== Emigration to the United States ==
As a result of the Panic of 1884, many of his sculpting clients were bankrupted and Dupont found he could no longer sustain his business. Under the advice of his wife, the couple moved to New York City, where they established a photography studio in Harlem, with Etta handling the finances so that Dupont could focus on the art. His business strategy was to focus on photographic portraits of celebrities. This proved to be so successful that in 1886 they moved the studio to 574 Fifth Avenue in Midtown Manhattan and he soon became the official photographer for the recently formed Metropolitan Opera. The new studio also included space for sculpting, but it was the photography that was far more lucrative.

== Techniques ==
Dupont was, like his contemporary Napoleon Sarony, renowned for his ability to minimize the shortcomings of his subjects, mostly through the use of perspective. According to one anecdote, Dupont once demonstrated this to a class of amateurs using two female models, one thin and the other heavyset. By placing them face-to-face, the foreground arm of the thin woman appeared to be the same size as the background arm of the heavier one. He was also skilled in the use of natural light and outfitted his studio with screens and reflectors to maximize the effect of sunlight.

== Later life ==
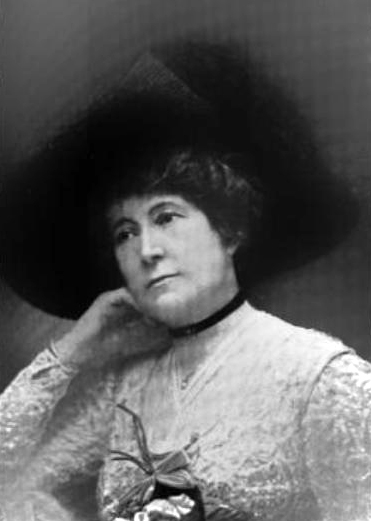
Etta Greer Dupont

In the 1890s, Aimé Dupont began suffering from stomach cancer. Just prior to a sitting with Emma Eames, he fell ill and was unable to work. Despite never having done photography work before, Etta Dupont stepped in and successfully kept the appointment. From then on, she would be responsible for posing the subjects. Dupont died of his condition on 16 February 1900. Afterwards, Etta became the photographer for the business (and in later years, their son Albert also took his turn behind the camera), keeping the name Aimé Dupont Studio. For many years, a number of the photographic subjects were under the belief that she was Aimé Dupont. Her endeavors proved to be successful enough for her to open another studio in Newport, Rhode Island, photographing socialites when she closed the New York studio for the summers. However, in 1906 the Metropolitan Opera, the studio's primary client, hired its own photographer, and without the artistic direction of Dupont, the business began to suffer. Finally, in 1920, Etta had to declare bankruptcy. She sold the business to an investor, and the name Aimé Dupont Studio continued as a portrait studio until the 1950s.

== Gallery ==
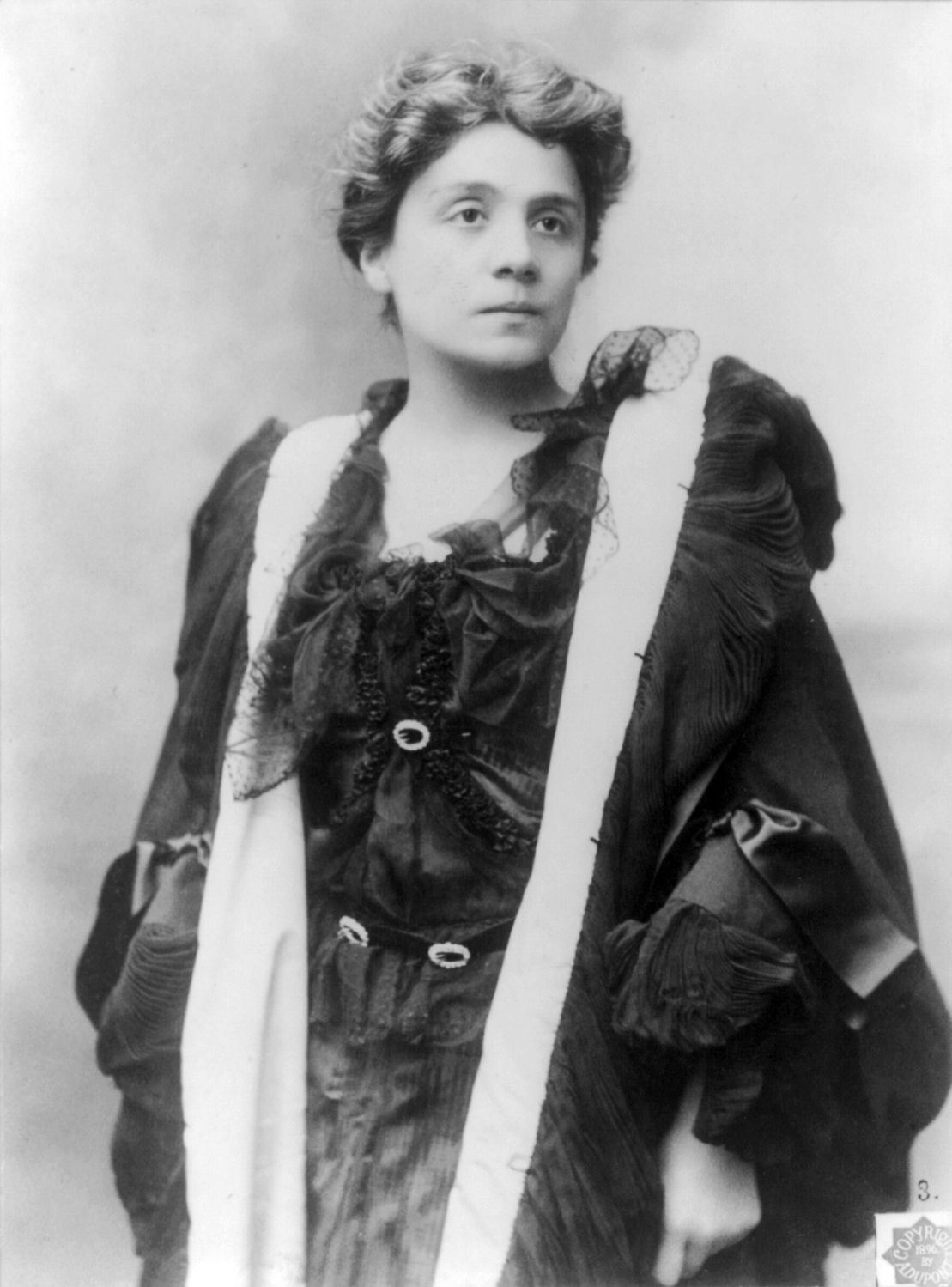
Eleonora Duse, 1890

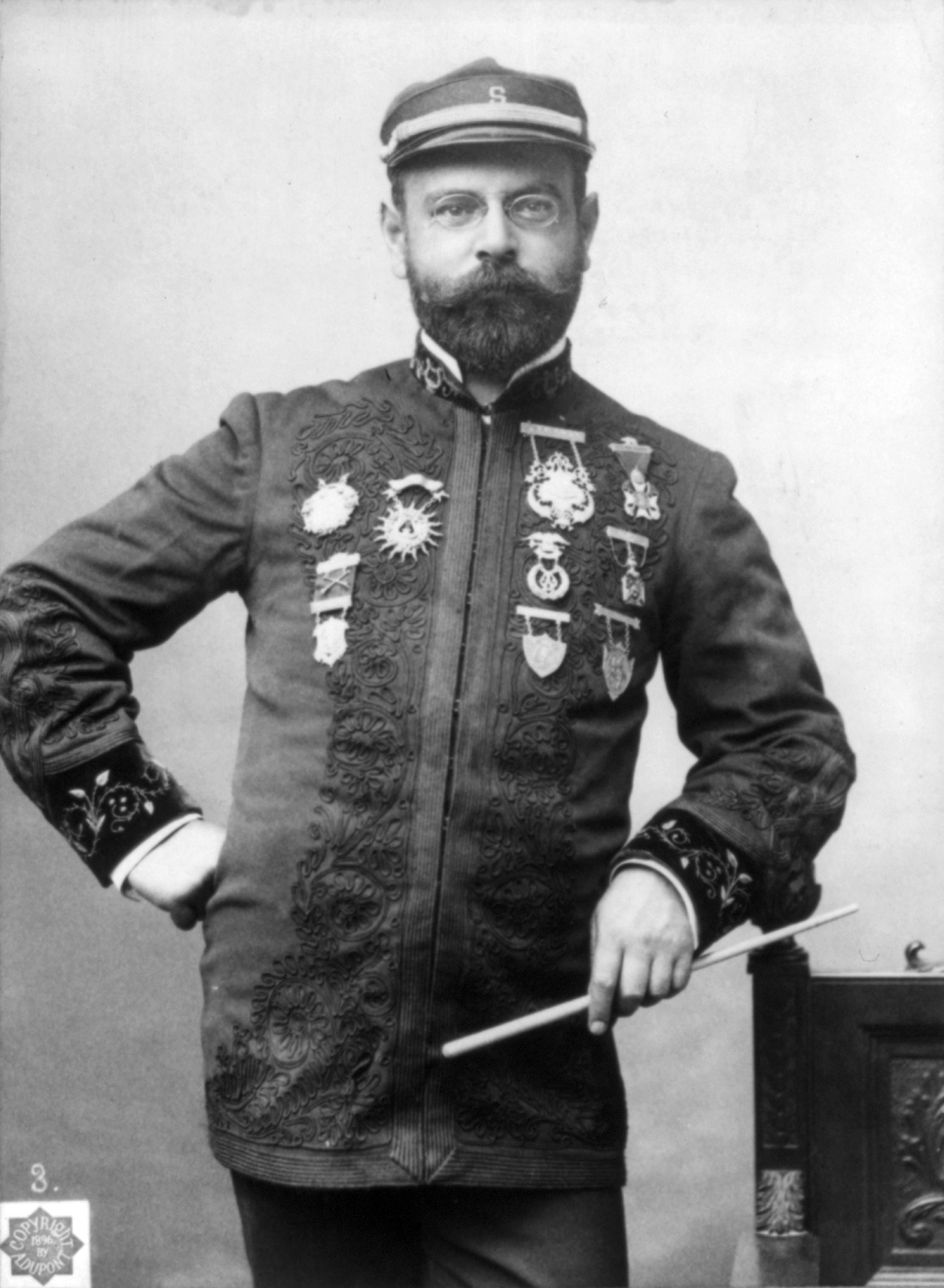
John Philip Sousa, 1896

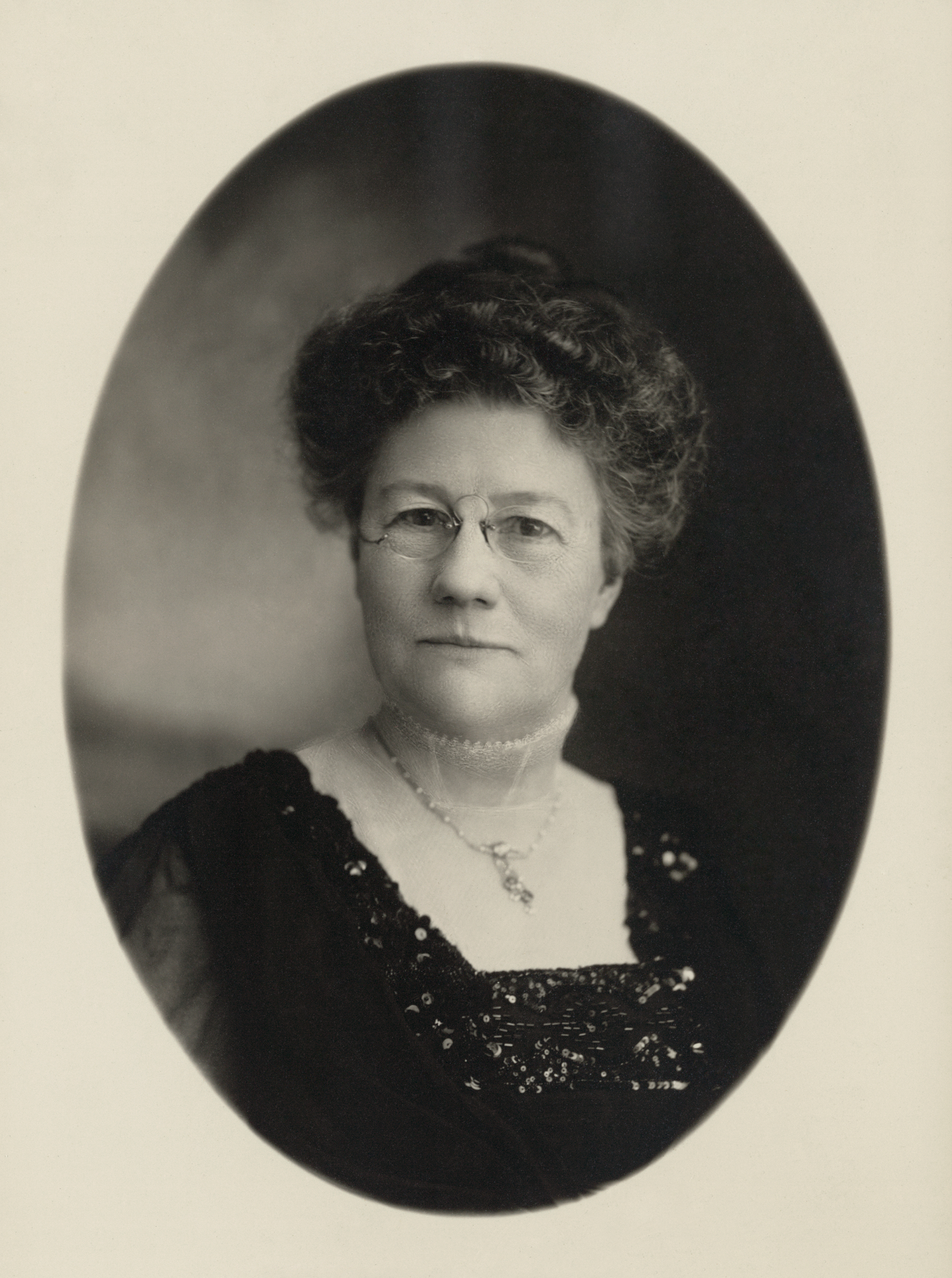
Ida Husted Harper, ca. 1910-20 (photo by Etta Greer or Albert Dupont)
