= Lina Poletti =

Italian writer, poet, playwright, and feminist (1885–1971)

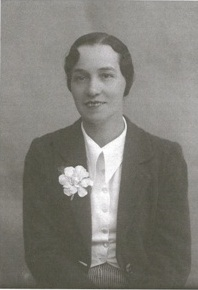

Cordula "Lina" Poletti (27 August 1885 – 12 December 1971) was an Italian writer, poet, playwright, and feminist. Often described as beautiful and rebellious, she was prone to wear men's clothing and is considered one of the first women in Italy to openly declare her lesbianism.

== Early life and education ==
Cordula Poletti was born on 27 August 1885 in Ravenna to Rosina Donati and Francesco, as the third of four daughters. Her family was well-to-do and owned a home near the Piazza del Popolo. She studied with Giovanni Pascoli at the University of Bologna and completed her education in 1907 with a thesis which analysed the poetry of Giosuè Carducci.

== Career and activism ==
In 1908 she attended the First National Congress of Women (Primo Congresso Femminile Nazionale) hosted by the Consiglio Nazionale delle Donne Italiane (National Council of Italian Women, CNDI) in Rome. The conference marked a change in the women's movement in Italy from a focus on humanitarian welfare projects to a commitment to women's suffrage and full recognition of women's legal and civic rights. There she met the well-known writer Sibilla Aleramo, who shared her commitment to social change that would eliminate the subordinate position women held in Italian society. Following the conference, the two women worked on an educational endeavour to provide education to rural peasantry and on relief efforts in Calabria and Sicily following the December 1908 earthquake.

Poletti and Aleramo soon became involved in a passionate relationship, despite the fact that Aleramo was living with Giovanni Cena, a noted poet from Turin since 1902. Aleramo expressed in her letters to Poletti that she never felt guilt for having loved both of them at the same time, but both Poletti and Cena had difficulty accepting that she could love each of them. Poletti was unable to persuade Aleramo to choose between them, and both Cena and Poletti ended their relationship with her by late 1910.

The following year, Poletti married Santi Muratori, the director of the Biblioteca Classense in Ravenna, though they did not live together. Shortly after their marriage, she met Eleonora Duse, at the time a popular stage actress, and became involved with her. The two moved in together in a house located in Florence, Italy, where Poletti started working on plays for Duse. They then moved to Venice, but their affair was passionate and volatile, causing Poletti to end it after about two years. She returned to Ravenna and began writing. From 1918 to 1958, Poletti was in a relationship with the Countess Eugenia Rasponi, a noblewoman and ardent fellow feminist.

Poletti and Rasponi initially lived together in the Palazzo Rasponi Murat, but after hosting the CNDI congress at the palace in 1921, they decided to move to Rome. In Rome, they lived on Via Giovanni Battista Morgagni and became involved in several intellectual salons. They attended theosophical and philosophical meetings and traveled throughout Europe and Asia seeking answers for existence. They organized seminars for Jiddu Krishnamurti, an indian spiritual figure, who was one of the first people to introduce Buddhism to Italy. Poletti was unable to write during the twenty years of fascism in Italy, as she and Rasponi were constantly under the scrutiny of authorities and their home was often raided.

Poletti is considered one of the first women in Italy to have openly declared her lesbianism.

== Death and legacy ==
Poletti died on 12 December 1971 in Sanremo, in the northern coastal region of Liguria. In l’Archivio Aleramo della Fondazione Gramsci (Aleramo Archive of the Gramsci Foundation) in Rome, Aleramo's diaries and letters brought to light her relationship with Poletti. Excerpts of the topics discussed between them can be found in Lettere d’amore a Lina (Love Letters to Lina) by Aleramo, who would go on to be one of Italy's leading feminists. Aleramo's writings to Poletti have, in more recent years, been studied for their open-minded views toward same-sex relationships.

== Selected works ==
- 1918: Il poema della Guerra
- 1919: Il cipressetto della rocca a Santarcangelo di Romagna
- 1921: La fabbrica dei mobili Rasponi a Santarcangelo di Romagna
- 1934: Il XXXIII Canto del Paradiso letto nella sala di Dante in Ravenna
- 1934: Stazio nella Divina Commedia
