= Mario Nicolis di Robilant =

Italian general of the Kingdom of Italy

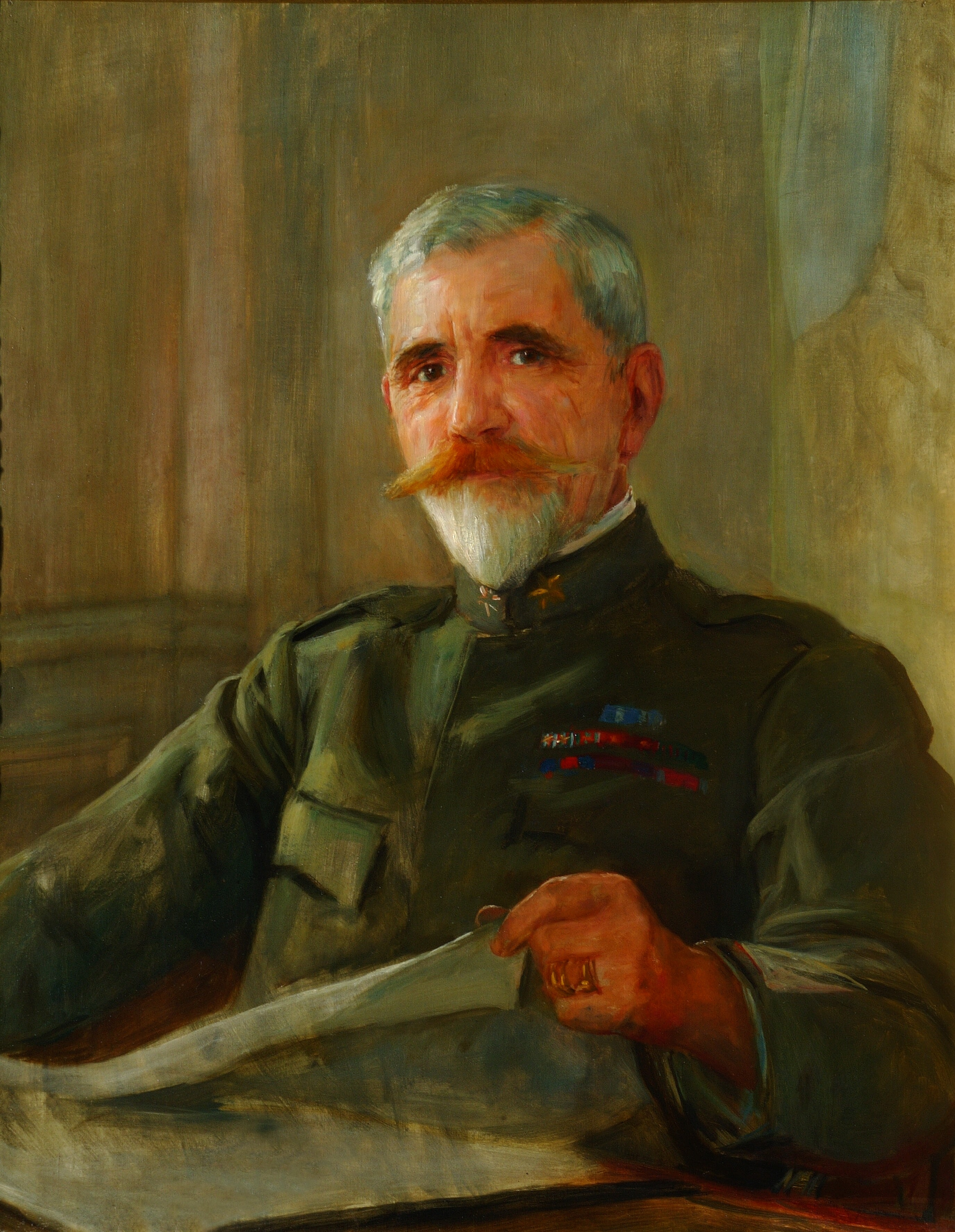
General Di Robilant

Mario Nicolis di Robilant (Torino, 28 April 1855 – Roma, 23 July 1943) was an Italian general of the Kingdom of Italy who actively participated in the World War I, mostly at the head of the Italian Fourth Army that won the first and second battles of the Piave.

At the entry of Italy in the First World War in May 1915, he commanded the Italian IV Army Corps, with which he conquered Mount Nero.

In September 1915, he became commander of the Fourth Army, stationed in the Cadore. At the height of the disastrous Battle of Caporetto in the autumn of 1917, General Luigi Cadorna ordered him to retreat with his army and clear the Cadore. Unaware of the seriousness of the situation, Di Robilant hesitated to execute the order, resulting in the capture of 11,500 of his men by the forces of the German general Otto von Below. Di Robilant withdrew to the Mount Grappa massif, where he won the defensive battle of Mount Grappa.

In February 1918, he became commander of the new Fifth Army. He ended the war as Italian military representative on the Supreme War Council in Versailles.

After World War I ended in 1918, he commanded the Eighth Army for a brief time, then went into retirement at his own request.

He became a senator in 1917.
