= Una donna =

Book by Sibilla Aleramo

Una donna is a 1906 novel by Sibilla Aleramo, and is one of the first explicitly feminist Italian novels. The novel was composed between 1901 and 1904, and while initially rejected by editors Treves, Baldini & Castoldi, it was published in November 1906 by Società Tipografica Editrice Nazionale (STEN). While the novel is autobiographical, no characters are named.

== Plot ==
The novel is told in three parts and begins with the protagonist as a young girl, describing her childhood. The relationship between the protagonist and her father was very influential to her development, and he encouraged his daughter to read, study, and foster a sense of surety and independence. Her mother is less present and the young protagonist views her as weak and submissive in comparison to her father.

When the protagonist was eight years old her father decided to leave Milan and his position as an engineer, and move the family to the South. There, he took up management of a factory and eventually employed his daughter as a secretary when she was around twelve. She enjoys the new environment and her work in the factory. The protagonist also describes the conditions of the town, where the majority of the families are lower income and critique the protagonist for her unconventional behavior.

Tensions continue to rise between the father and mother, and she grows increasingly unwilling to leave the house while his critiques of her become more frequent. This culminates in the mother attempting suicide, which she survives. However, it triggers an escalation in her dementia and she is eventually committed to an insane asylum. She remains there until her death.

The protagonist discovers that her father had been having an affair for some time, and their relationship grows strained and distant. During this delicate time, she starts to spend more time with a factory worker who she had considered a friend. He takes advantage of her vulnerable position and sexually assaults her, and she is forced to marry him within the course of several months. She is transferred to his family home, gives birth to a son, but continues to suffer his cruel behavior.

After her husband discovers that the protagonist had been responding to the attentions of another man, he brutally beats her and keeps her shut away in their home. During this period, with only her son to comfort her, she comes to love and depend on him as her only source of happiness. However, she also is beset by a growing depression, and attempts suicide after another violent beating. She is saved by the village's doctor, a kind man who had been checking on her periodically during her seclusion.

Because of a conflict with his father-in-law, the protagonist's husband decides to quit his job at the factory and move to Rome. There, the protagonist is afforded more freedom, helping to support the family by working as a writer at a feminist magazine. She makes several friends who help to foster a sense of independence and broaden her worldview, and she develops the theory that a woman must develop an identity outside of being a wife and mother.

While in Rome the protagonist's husband becomes jealous over the friendship she has with a male friend, and begins to beat her again. With a job and support system her only fear is that she won't be able to bring her child with her if she were to decide to leave her husband, which is confirmed when he refuses to consider an amicable separation. Meanwhile, the protagonist's father has decided to leave his position as the director of the factory and move back to the North. He leaves the post to his son-in-law, and the protagonist is left in Rome by herself while her husband goes back to work. After a friend that she was caring for passes, she returns to the South.

While living in the home that her mother had deteriorated in she feels more connected to her, and understands her struggle from so many years ago. Her husband continues to treat her poorly, and she finds out that he has contracted an STD. She realizes that if she stays with her family she will eventually either go mad like her mother, or commit suicide. The book ends with the protagonist leaving her husband and son, and moving in with her sister in the North. She tries to keep in contact with her son, but his letters are eventually intercepted by the husband. The book is dedicated to her son, in the hope that he will read it and understand her decision.

== Adaptations ==
In 1977 the novel was adapted by Rai into a televised miniseries, directed by Gianni Bongiovanni. The protagonist was played by Giuliana De Sio.

== See also ==
- Sibilla Aleramo
- Una donna (miniserie televisiva)
