= Mario Caracciolo di Feroleto =

Italian general during WWII

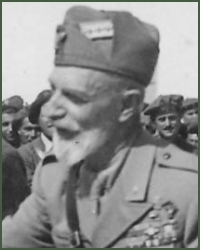
- Born: 26 February 1880; Naples, Kingdom of Italy
- Died: 21 December 1954 (aged 74); Rome, Italy
- Military career
- Allegiance: Kingdom of Italy
- Branch: Royal Italian Army
- Service years: 1899–1943
- Rank: General
- Commands: 13th Artillery Regiment; 22nd Infantry Division Cacciatori delle Alpi; 1st Cavalry Division Eugenio di Savoia; XXI Army Corps; Fourth Army; Fifth Army
- Conflicts: Italo-Turkish War; World War I; World War II; North African campaign; Operation Achse

Mario Caracciolo, Baron of Feroleto (Naples, 26 February 1880 – Rome, 21 December 1954) was an Italian general during World War II.

== Biography ==
Caracciolo began his military career as an artillery Second Lieutenant in 1899, attending the War School of the Royal Italian Army and serving as a staff officer at the command of the General Staff Officer Corps, then at the command of the "Novara" Infantry Brigade and later at the command of the IX Corps.

He participated in the Italo-Turkish War with the rank of Captain and later fought in the First World War as commander of a siege artillery group. After promotion to Colonel he commanded the 13th Artillery Regiment for six years.

After promotion to Major General, in 1934 he became commander of the 22nd Infantry Division Cacciatori delle Alpi and from 1935 to 1936 he commanded the 1st Cavalry Division Eugenio di Savoia. He was then appointed inspector of mobilization in Messina and in 1938 he became commander of the XXI Army Corps in Libya. On 1 January 1940 he was appointed Superior Inspector of Technical Services.

From 10 December 1940 to 15 April 1941 he commanded the Fourth Army in Piedmont and Liguria, and from April until 5 September 1941 he commanded the Fifth Army in Libya. On 5 September the Fifth Army was dissolved, but it was reformed in Italy in April 1942, with Caracciolo again in command. The new Fifth Army had its headquarters in Florence and later in Viterbo, and was tasked with local and coastal defense in Lazio, Tuscany and Sardinia.

Caracciolo was still in command of the Fifth Army when the Armistice of Cassibile was announced on 8 September 1943. He tried to organize a resistance against German attacks during Operation Achse, but his army gradually disintegrated as several of his subordinates, such as the garrison commanders in Florence, Massa and Arezzo, handed over their cities to the Germans without resistance. On 12 September Caracciolo, who had been personally involved in the fighting, formally dissolved his Army and then went into hiding in Rome, where he made contact with the Fronte Militare Clandestino, a Resistance network composed of former Army officers. The Germans placed a bounty of 20,000 lire on his head, and in January 1944 he was arrested by the Special Police Detachment of Pietro Koch, handed over to the SS, and imprisoned in Verona, Venice and Brescia, where he was tried by the Italian Social Republic’s Special Tribunal and sentenced to death. The sentence was however reduced to a fifteen-year prison term as Caracciolo was a war invalid. He was liberated by the partisans on 25 April 1945.

After the war he published several books (E poi? La tragedia dell’Esercito, in 1945; Tradimento italiano o tedesco?, in 1946; Le sette carceri di un generale, in 1948; L'ultima vicenda della V Armata, posthumous) and died in Rome in 1954.
