= Emilia Errera =

Italian writer (1866–1901)

- Born: 1866; Trieste, Austrian Empire
- Died: 1901 (aged 34–35); Milan, Italy
- Occupations: Teacher, writer

Emilia Errera (May 15, 1866 – December 12, 1901) was an Italian teacher, essayist, and literary critic known for her historical analyses and her early Italian scholarship on Charles Dickens. Educated in Venice and Florence, she taught history, geography, and Italian in schools before establishing herself as a contributor to Italian literary magazines of the late 19th century.

Her work was noted for its moral perspective on literature and its emphasis on themes of national identity, civic virtue, and historical understanding. After her death in 1901, her writings were collected and published posthumously by her family.

== Biography ==
Emilia, was born on 15 May 1866 in Trieste, Austrian Empire to a Jewish family. Her parents were Cesare, a Venetian, and mother Luigia Fano from Mantua. Her siblings included writer Rosa Errera (1864-1946), brother Carlo Errera (1867-1936), and sister Anna Errera (1870-1940).

Emilia graduated teacher training in Venice and attended the Institute of Magisterium in Florence, where her instructors included P. Villari and Enrico Nencioni, who had taught Italian literature there since 1884 and who passed on to her a love of history and literature.

Much later, in 1900, Emilia credited Nencioni, who was regarded as a connoisseur and interpreter of English writers, with fostering her lifelong interest in writers such as Charles Dickens (she referred to him as Carlo Dickens). She dedicated a commemorative article to Nencioni in the Florentine magazine Il Marzocco full of gratitude and giving him credit for passing along his teachings.

=== Teacher ===
In 1887, she qualified with honors to teach in secondary schools. Beginning her teaching career as an assistant to the professor of Italian language in normal school, she soon qualified to teach history and geography. She moved to the commercial technical school, refusing better assignments outside of Florence so as not to leave her mother alone. After her mother died, Errera moved to Milan to join her sisters and teach at the normal school. Two years later, in 1892, she started teaching history and geography at the "GB Piatti" technical school, and then Italian language in the women's technical school. Finally, she returned to the Piatti school.

=== Writer ===
In 1887, Errera's original work began appearing in Italian magazines, including the National Review, the Magazine for Young Ladies, Cordelia, Albo per la Giovinezza, Readings for Young Girls, Library for Children, and more.

In the National Review of Florence (June 16, 1890, pp. 620-688), she published an essay about the historical-literary character of Alessandro Tassoni's Filippiche, an incendiary pamphlet in which Tassoni attacked the then Spanish domination of Italy. The work by Errera begins with a broad examination of the environment and the facts around the story, in particular the author's relations with the Savoy house. Her sympathy for the author seems based on shared feelings of homeland and freedom, along with the hope for a united Italy.

In her next essay "The Stone of Political Comparison by Traiano Boccalini" (Milan 1891), Errera showed greater detachment.

Her essays about Charles Dickens (whose name in Italian translated to Carlo Dickens) became a notable contribution to the language, and her biographical-critical essays on the writer were published widely. According to Paesano,

"Appearing in the Magazine for Young Ladies (15 December 1895 and 15 June 1898) and in Il Marzocco (4 February 1900), she provides indications on the distinctly moral point of view with which E. looked at literature. She found it reassuring that the author of Oliver Twist had no hesitation in drawing a clear line between 'good and evil,' between completely positive characters and exclusively negative characters; and she appreciated his humor and a feeling of hope."

Errera wrote about a contemporary Italian writer, E. De Marchi (in Il Marzocco, 17 February 1901), espousing similar arguments. She worked with her sister Rosa Errera on Voices and incorrect ways: Essay on the correction of idiots and other errors of the Milanese use, Milan 1898, and the article "On the teaching of history in secondary schools", which appeared in Il Marzocco (22 and 29 December 1901; 2 February 1902). In her published opinions, Errera hoped that history teachers and publishers would pay more attention to the times and products of peace, rather than to the military view of history. Her 1895 Carlo Dickens was the first full-length study of Dickens in Italian.

=== Death ===
Emilia Errera died of pneumonia on 12 December 1901 in Milan at the age of 35. She was buried in the Jewish cemetery in Milan.

Posthumously, Emilia's writings were collected by brother Carlo Errera and his sisters in a volume titled Carlo Dickens ... (and other writings), with a preface by writer Angiolo Orvieto, Bologna, 1903. According to Paesano, in that preface, Orvieto noted that "her ideas were 'the most minute and faithful that one has.'" A review in the London Saturday Review commented "Emilia Errera led a busy life and wrote little, but that little is well written and makes us regret that she did not live to write more."

== Selected works ==
According to worldcat.org, these are the most widely held works by Emilia Errera in libraries:

- Gli amici di Dante (Book), one edition, published in 1890, in Italian
- Sulle Filippiche di Alessandro Tassoni, one edition, published in 1890, in Italian
- Gli amici di Dante, one edition, published in 1890, in Italian
- La pietra del paragone politico di Traiano Boccalini (Book), two editions, published in 1891, in Italian
- Carlo Dickens, one edition, published in 1895, in Italian
- Carlo Dickens. Estratto dalla: "Rivista per le Signorine." (Book) one edition, published in 1895, in French
- Carlo Dickens, four editions, published in 1903, in Italian
