= 5th Army (Italy) =

Field army of the Royal Italian Army in World War I and World War II

The 5th Army (Italian: 5ª Armata) was a World War I and World War II field army of the Royal Italian Army.

== World War I ==
In World War I the 5th Army was created on 25 May 1916 to help stop the Austrian Trentino Offensive. It was again disbanded on 2 July 1916.

It consisted of

- XXIV Army Corps (Luciano Secco)
- XX Army Corps (Ettore Mambretti)
- XXII Army Corps (Evaristo Mossolin)
- XXVI Army Corps (Luca Montuori)
- VIII Army Corps (Ottavio Briccola)

Its commanders were :

- Pietro Frugoni (until 19 June 1916)
- Settimio Piacentini.

== World War II ==
The Italian 5th Army was formed in 1939 to defend Libya from the French in Tunisia and Algeria. After the Battle of France ended, the 5th Army became a source of men and supplies for the Italian Tenth Army on the border with Egypt. The army was disbanded on 16 February 1941 and incorporated into General Headquarters North Africa. The Army was shortly reformed in North Africa between 15 April 1941 and 5 September 1941.
It was again reformed in Italy on 10 April 1942 to defend Tuscany, Sardinia and from November 1942 also Corsica. In September 1943, after the Armistice of Cassibile, the 5th Army surrendered to the Germans.

Commanders were

- Italo Gariboldi (1939 – February 1941)
- Mario Caracciolo di Feroleto (April 1941 – September 1941)
- Mario Caracciolo di Feroleto (April 1942 – September 1943)

In June 1940 it consisted of:

- X Army Corps
  - 25th Infantry Division "Bologna"
  - 55th Infantry Division "Savona"
  - 60th Infantry Division "Sabratha"
- XX Army Corps
  - 17th Infantry Division "Pavia"
  - 61st Infantry Division "Sirte"
  - 27th Infantry Division "Brescia"
- XXIII Army Corps
  - 1st CC.NN. Division "23 Marzo"
  - 2nd CC.NN. Division "28 Ottobre"
