= Ernestina Paper =

Italian medical doctor

- Born: Ernestina Puritz-Manassé; 1846; Odessa, Russian Empire
- Died: 14 February 1926 (aged 79–80); Florence, Italy

Ernestina Paper (née Puritz-Manassè; 1846 – 14 February 1926) was the first female university graduate in modern Italy. She graduated in 1877 in medicine and surgery from the University of Florence.

== Early life and education ==
Ernestina Puritz-Manassè was born in Odessa in 1846 to a wealthy bourgeois Jewish family of Russian origins. After graduating high school, Paper attended the University of Zurich for three semesters between 1870 and 1872. This was not an uncommon path for Russian female students, as women were not allowed to attend university in 19th century Russia except for a brief period between 1859 and 1863.

In 1872, she moved to Italy and enrolled at the University of Pisa. She completed her studies at the University of Florence's Istitutto di Studi Superiori, earning a medical degree and becoming the first woman to graduate from university in post-unification Italy.

== Career ==
After graduating, Paper opened her own private practice focused on treating women and children. An 1879 publication noted that Paper attended to women and was "spoken of as a most skillful physician". She often made medical treatment free to those who could not afford it.

In 1884, two cases of amenorrhea cured by Paper using electricity were reported on in scientific journals. She was reported to have attended an international medical congress in 1894.

Paper remained in Italy for the remainder of her life apart from 1897 to 1905 in which she went back to Odessa. She died in Florence in 1926.

== Political activity and feminism ==
Paper was active as a feminist and women's education advocate along with Mary Nathan, who was the wife of her brother (Giacomo Puritz) and daughter of Mayor of Rome Ernesto Nathan. Paper and Nathan were leaders in the Tuscan Women's Federation advocacy group, with Paper being President of the group's hygiene section until at least 1921. During World War I she was against mandatory civil service for women, claiming this was against the wellness of families since women should be closer to their family.

== Personal life ==
She married Giacomo Paper, though the exact year is unknown. Some sources claim that she gave birth to a daughter, Elisa, in 1875.
