= Rosa Errera =

Italian writer (1864–1946)

- Born: 13 July 1864; Venice, Austrian Empire
- Died: 13 February 1946 (aged 81); Milan, Italy
- Occupations: Writer, Translator, Teacher
- Relatives: Emilia Errera, Carlo Errera, Anna Errera

Rosa Errera (13 July 1864 – 13 February 1946) was an Italian writer, translator, and teacher. Her most well known work, published in 1921, was about the poet Dante Alighieri.

== Biography ==
Errera was born in Venice on July 13, 1864 to Cesare, a Jew of Spanish origin, and to Luigia Fano, from Mantua, Italy. Her father was a stockbroker who moved the family from Venice to Trieste after a serious financial downturn. After his death, the remaining family returned to Venice to live in the home of a paternal uncle who, despite having five children of his own, took in Rosa and her three siblings, Emilia (1866–1901), Carlo (1867-1936), and Anna Errera (1870-1940).

After completing her high school studies in Venice, Errera settled in Florence, where she attended the Higher Institute of Magisterium under the guidance of an influential teacher Enrico Nencioni, who had taught Italian literature there since 1884 and who was highly regarded as an interpreter of English writers.

=== Teacher ===
From 1884 to 1889, Errera taught Italian letters to students in lower secondary schools in Florence. Subsequently, she won a competition for high school students and moved to Milan, where from 1892 she was able to attend the normal school Gaetana Agnesi. Over the next two years, her writings appeared in Il Piccolo Italiano, a Milanese weekly magazine edited by Aurelio Stoppoloni which proposed to "educate children by delighting them," but also urged them to live the "Italian spirit."

Meanwhile, while still teaching, she started pursuing writing for children and young readers with particular attention to the ideals of homeland, family and humanity, which were receiving increasing attention in Italy at the time. She would continue teaching until about 1912.

=== Writer ===
In 1891 Errera published her first books. Many were anthologies curated for middle and high school students, and some were readers for elementary students, including La Villanti Family (Milan 1896). According to Paesano, her fictional works were written to replace "the spells of the fairy tale with the realism of family affections and domestic care."

Her educational goals took different forms in her writings. Sometimes, Errera wrote an appealing story, but intended that the story would be only the pretext to giving a lesson, going on to incorporate useful lifestyle tips or encouragement to follow good behavior. In this way, she was able to reach the children of the bourgeoisie to whom these stories were inevitably addressed. By simply reading a good story, she found she was able to teach a wide range of good life lessons to new audiences. According to Paesano,

"... altruism, spirit of sacrifice, moderation, honesty, courage, respect for the elderly and for the humble, and not least sincerity, a principle on which E. persistently returned to clarify the necessary pedagogical function in an operetta entitled For Sincerity of our Pupils, published in Florence in 1922 in the series School and Life directed by Giuseppe Lombardo Radice. In addition to identifying sincerity as a means for the expressive development of the child, the main reasons for E.'s reflection on school and education problems, partly expressed in an article published in 1904 (Piccole Workers of Thought, in Il Marzocco, 6 March 1904): the need to adapt programs to the needs of particular school groups, to prune what was too "bookish" and mnemonic was entrusted to education, to mitigate the importance attributed to the [school] grades."

=== Brief retirement ===
Around 1912, a serious nervous disease forced Errera to reduce the intensity of her work. She formally left teaching in 1917. Her illness required a change of scenery so she moved her residence from the busy center of Milan to a small villa on the city's outskirts, surrounded by greenery. There, her health improved and she resumed writing, often still aiming her lessons to young readers.

In 1919, she competed for a prize offered by the Treves publishing house in Milan, which was searching for a "book of Italianness." Errera won the first prize of 10,000 lira with her book Noi, published by Treves in 1920. It had what has been described as a "somewhat artificial plot," featuring a meeting of well-known historical and artistic personalities (S. Francesco, Dante, Colombo, Leonardo da Vinci and Mazzini), who discussed the Italian national identity and revealed strong patriotic sentiments. These were popular ideas of the time in Italy.

In 1921, she completed Dante, published in Florence to mark the 600th anniversary of the poet's death. Five editions of the text were published between 1921 and 2010 in Italian and English. (Dante remains Errera's most widely available book, which, as of 2020, is still available in print with copies held by 34 WorldCat member libraries worldwide.)

=== Later writing ===
Errera's popular biography about Daniele Manin (Manin, 1923) told a patriotic story about the 19th century President of the Venetian Republic and leader of the Risorgimento (Italian unification movement) in Venice in May 1849. Manin headed the city's desperate resistance against the occupying Austrians.

In 1925, she published at least two more books, and those were followed in 1932 by two at least more, L'asino d'oro e Latre Favole di Animali di Fori and La Storia di Peter Pan.

== Years of Fascism ==
With the rise of fascism, Errera began experiencing increasing conflict because of her Jewish heritage. When she refused to pay tribute in her books to the new fascist regime, thousands of her printed works were destroyed, "sent to the pulp, never reprinted." To earn a living, she worked as a translator and directed "a series of Italian and foreign classics together with Maria Mariani."

Beginning in 1938, Errera became a direct victim of new racial laws targeting Jews. She was suddenly prohibited from selling her books or from consulting resources at libraries. Achille Norsa recalls that, as a result, her home was frequented by scholars that included Angiolo Orvieto, Silvio Spaventa Filippi, Clemente Rebora and Giuseppe Antonio Borgese, who called her residence a "temple of freedom," for the "firm opposition to fascism" and the "faith in freedom."

According to Paesano, the most intense racial persecutions took place at the end of 1943. To survive during that time, Errera was saved from being deported thanks to her friend and sometime co-author Teresa Trento, "who kept her hidden in her home for over a year and a half."

Errera died in Milan on 13 February 1946 at 81 years of age.

== Selected works ==
Some of Errera's books are still widely available in libraries worldwide, some in several editions. In total, she has been credited with 28 works in 53 publications in two languages.

- Good people. For young girls, Milan. 1891
- Michelino, sketches illustrated by G. Amato, Milan. 1891
- Wrong voices and ways. Essay to correct idioticisms and other errors of Milanese use (written with her sister Emilia Errera), Milan. 1898
- Grandfather and grandson and other short stories, Milan. 1899
- Little gentlemen (a reading book for male fourth graders), Turin. 1902
- Without breakfast, Milan. 1902
- A story of umbrellas, Milan. 1902
- Little gentlemen (a reading book for male fifth graders), Milan. 1903
- A century ago, Milan. 1903
- Lorenzo de 'Medici. Selected and annotated readings, Florence. 1906
- As people who think their way, Milan. 1907
- Galileo Galilei and his school. Selected and annotated readings, Florence. 1908
- Italy, anthology, written with T. Trento, Milan 1908
- Gioconda and Micin, Milan. 1910
- Palestine. Notes for youth, Milan. 1918
- Chicco (readings for the second grade class), Turin. 1920
- Filiberto the carpenter, Turin. 1920
- What the chestnut told, readings for the second element, Turin. 1920
- Difficult times, Turin. 1920
- Dante, Florence. 1921
- Piccoletta, for children, Florence. 1923
- The lamp and other stories, Milan. 1932
- Grammar booklet for third class elementary, Florence. 1933
- Towards the new school (preparation book for the entrance exams to middle schools, for the pupils of Lombardy, in collaboration with T. Trento and A. Molinari), Florence. 1933
- A magician of the theater: G . Goldoni, Turin. 1934
- As they say, Turin. 1936

Selected translations:

- I. Fiorenza, The children's heart, Florence. 1923
- K. Wiggin Douglas, Rebecca of Rio Sole, Florence. 1923
- H. Heine, Poems, Milan. 1925
- M. Craik Dinali, Life for Life, Turin. 1930
