= Gabriella Rasponi Spalletti =

Italian women's rights activist

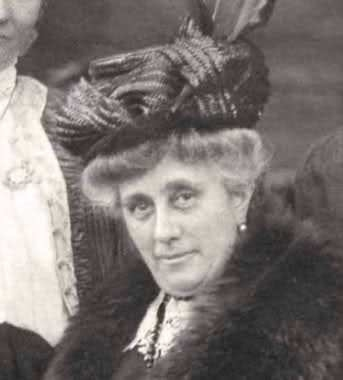
Gabriella Rasponi Spalletti

Gabriella Rasponi Spalletti (1853–1931) was an Italian feminist, educator and philanthropist. Keen to improve conditions for women, in 1897 she founded an embroidery school in Quarrata, Tuscany. From 1903, as president of the National Council of Italian Women, she supported voting rights for women and was behind the highly successful National Congress of Italian Women in 1908.

== Biography ==
Born in Ravenna on 10 April 1853 into an aristocratic family, Gabriella Rasponi Spalletti was the eldest daughter of Count Cesare Rasponi Bonanzi (1822–1886), a politician and vice-consul, and Letizia Rasponi Murat (1832–1906). Apart from a short period in a convent, she was educated at home by private tutors. In 1870, she married the politician Count Venceslao Spalleti Trivelli with whom she had five children, three of whom survived: Carolina (1873–1940, Giambattista (1890–1967) and Cesare (1892–1967).

After moving to Rome with her husband and family in 1894, Rasponi Spalletti became a board member of the Italian Red Cross and joined the Associazione per la donna (Association for Women), where she was responsible for medical supplies, fund raising and membership. Together with her husband, she supported charities and, in 1897, opened an embroidery school in Quarrata. Not only did it revive interest in local arts and crafts, it also developed into a thriving cooperative with hundred of embroiderers.

In Rome, she became an active salonière, inviting writers, philosophers, journalists and politicians to their home opposite the Quirinal Palace. Male guests included Marco Minghetti and Ruggero Bonghi, but there were also many influential women, including Dora Melegari, Antonietta Giacomelli and Giuseppina Lemaire, providing support for her interest in the social sphere and for working women.

Following the death of her husband in 1899, she devoted renewed efforts to the women's movement, addressing the practical, intellectual and educational activities of women. After reinvigorating the Federazione romana delle opere femminili (Roman Federation for Women's Works), in 1903 she founded the National Council of Italian Women.

While the 1908 National Congress of Italian Women in Rome attracted over a thousand participants, a proposal to abolish religion in schools by the socialist Linda Malnati, supported by Rasponi Spalletti, caused the Catholics to leave and establish the Unione fra le donne cattoliche d’Italia (Union of the Catholic Women of Italy).

Gabriella Rasponi Spalletti died in Rome on 29 September 1931.

== See also ==
- Eugenia Rasponi
