= 4th Army (Italy) =

The 4th Army (Italian: 4ª Armata) was a World War I and World War II field army of the Royal Italian Army.

== World War I ==
During World War I, the 4th Army was positioned between the Asiago plateau and the Carnic Alps. During the Caporetto disaster, it had to withdraw to the Mount Grappa massif, where it won the defensive battle of Mount Grappa. It then participated in the successful Battle of the Piave River (June 1918) and Battle of Vittorio Veneto (October–November 1918).

Its commanders were :

- Luigi Nava (May 1915 - September 1915)
- Mario Nicolis di Robilant (September 1915 - February 1918)
- Gaetano Giardino (April 1918 - December 1918)

== World War II ==
At the beginning of World War II, the 4th Army was one of three armies that made up Army Group West commanded by Prince General Umberto di Savoia. Together with the Italian First Army and the Italian Seventh Army (kept in reserve), the 4th Army attacked French forces during the Italian invasion of France.
After the Franco-Italian Armistice, the 4th Army occupied a small zone of France, which was enlarged in November 1942, when during Case Anton the Italians occupied all of southeastern France and Corsica.
After the Armistice of Cassibile in September 1943, the 4th Army surrendered to the Germans.

Its commanders were :

- Camillo Grossi (1938 – 1940)
- Mario Vercellino (1940 – 1940)
- Alfredo Guzzoni (1940 – 1940)
- Mario Caracciolo di Feroleto (1940 – 1941)
- Mario Vercellino (1941 – 1943)

=== Composition (1940) ===
- I Army Corps
- IV Army Corps
- Alpine Army Corps

=== Composition (1942–1943) ===
- I Army Corps
- XV Army Corps
- XXII Army Corps
