= Sibilla Aleramo =

Italian feminist writer and poet (1876–1960)

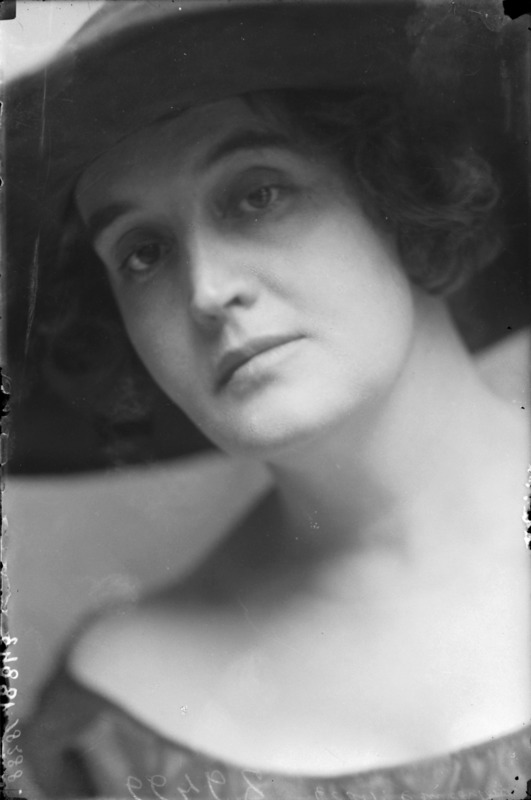
- Sibilla Aleramo, Rome, 1913
- Born: Marta Felicina Faccio; 14 August 1876; Alessandria, Kingdom of Italy
- Died: 13 January 1960 (aged 83); Rome, Italy
- Occupations: Writer; feminist
- Writing career
- Notable awards: Viareggio Prize

Signature
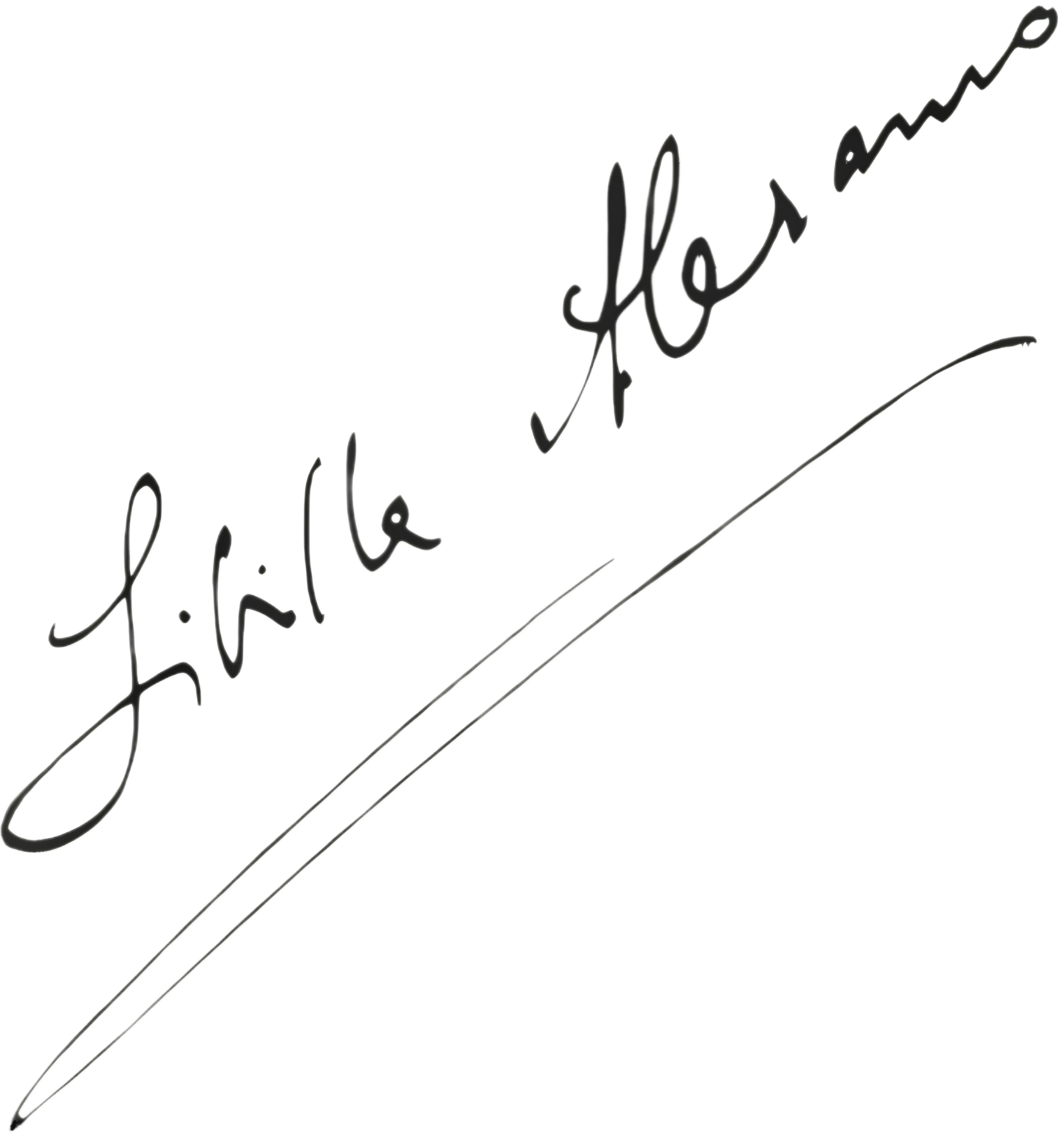

Sibilla Aleramo (born Marta Felicina Faccio; 14 August 1876 – 13 January 1960) was an Italian feminist writer and poet known for her autobiographical depictions of life as a woman in late 19th century Italy.

== Life and career ==
Aleramo was born as Marta Felicina Faccio (a.k.a. "Rina") in Alessandria, Piedmont, and grew up in Milan. At 11, she moved with her family to Civitanova Marche, where her father had been appointed manager of a glass factory. Unable to continue her education beyond primary school, Aleramo continued to study on her own, seeking advice from her former teacher about what to read. While employed in the same factory where her father worked, she was raped in an empty office room by Ulderico Pierangeli, a co-worker ten years her senior, when she was only 15. Rina did not tell her parents about the event, and when Pierangeli asked for her hand, she was persuaded by her family to marry him. A year and a half later, at 17, she had her first and only child, Walter.

Pierangeli was abusive and violent and in 1901 Aleramo moved to Rome, leaving her 6-year-old son behind. She supposedly was thwarted in her repeated attempts to win custody and all connection between them was severed by his father. She did meet him again about 30 years later, but he rejected her because of her abandonment of him. After a brief relationship with a young artist, Felice Damiani, she lived together for some years with Giovanni Cena, a writer and journalist, who encouraged her to turn her life story into a fictionalized memoir (and to take on the pseudonym of Sibilla Aleramo). In 1906 her first novel, Una donna (A Woman), a chronicle of a woman's decision to leave her brutal husband, was published. She also became active in political and artistic circles, especially Futurism, and engaged in volunteer work in the Ager Romanus, the poverty-stricken countryside surrounding Rome. In those years she also engaged in tumultuous love affairs, with Umberto Boccioni and Dino Campana (the 2002 film Un viaggio chiamato amore, by Michele Placido, depicts Aleramo's affair with the latter).

In 1908, while still involved with Cena, she met Cordula "Lina" Poletti at a suffragette's congress. The two women started a relationship, later recounted in the novel Il passaggio (The Crossing, 1919), a book in which Aleramo also modified some of the events told in Una donna, arguing that Giovanni Cena had originally convinced her to slightly change her story. Aleramo was one of the contributors to Florence-based magazine Il Marzocco and Lidel, which was in circulation in the period 1919–1935.

In the following years, Aleramo became one of Italy's leading feminists. In 1925 she supported the Manifesto of the Anti-Fascist Intellectuals. Later in life, Aleramo toured the continent and was active in Communist politics after World War II. In 1948 she took part to the World Congress of Intellectuals in Defense of Peace in Wrocław.

Aleramo famously said that she felt like she lived three lives. The first one, as a mother and wife, was outlined in her novel Una donna. Her second one was when she volunteered in a shelter for homeless people in Rome run by the Unione Femminile and was active in feminist organizations. Her 'third life' consisted of the 30 years she spent writing about her life experiences in her work. Aleramo died in Rome at the age of 83.

== Legacy ==
Aleramo's life is mostly significant for her trail-blazing trajectory as an independent woman and artist, and as an individual who lived through different ages (Liberal Italy, Fascism, Post-World War II, the advent of the Italian Republic) while always maintaining cultural and political visibility. Her personal correspondence with Poletti has, in more recent years, been studied due to their open-minded view on homosexual relationships. Aleramo's first book in particular, Una donna, is considered a classic of Italian literature, and the first outspokenly feminist novel written by an Italian author.

== Selected works ==
- Una donna (A Woman, 1906)
- Il passaggio (The Crossing, 1919)
- Andando e stando (Moving and Being, 1921)
- Momenti (Moments, 1921)
- Trasfigurazione (Transfiguration, 1922)
- Endimione (Endymion, 1923, play)
- Poesie (Poems, 1929)
- Gioie d'occasione (Occasional Pleasures, 1930)
- Il frustino (The Whip, 1932)
- Sì alla terra (Yes to the Earth, 1934)
- Orsa minore (Ursa Minor, 1938)
- Diario e lettere: dal mio diario (Diary of a Woman, 1945)
- Selva d'amore (Forest of Love, 1947)
- Aiutatemi a dire (Help Me to Speak, 1951)
- Gioie d'occasione e altre ancora (More Occasional Pleasures, 1954)
- Luci della mia sera (Lights of My Evening, 1956)
- Lettere (Letters, 1958)

== Bibliography ==
- Aldrich, Robert and Garry Wotherspoon. Who's Who in Gay and Lesbian History, from Antiquity to World War II. Routledge, London, 2001. ISBN 978-0-415-25369-7.
- Grimaldi Morosoff, Anna. Transfigurations: The Autobiographical Novels of Sibilla Aleramo (Writing About Women). Peter Lang, Bern, 1999. ISBN 978-0-820-43351-6.

Grimaldi Morosoff, Anna. "Il Passaggio: An Autobiographical Novel by Sibilla Aleramo." in Studies in Honor of Maria Salgado. Juan De La Cuesta, Newark, Delaware, 1995.
