= Consiglio Nazionale delle Donne Italiane =

Italian women's organization

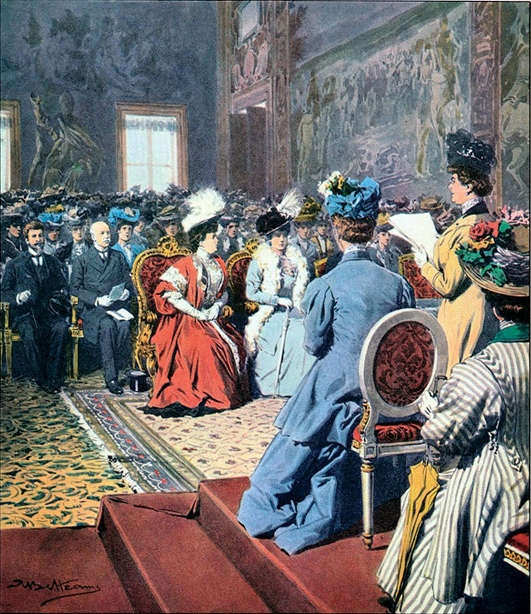
Congresso delle Donne Italiane, Rome, 1908, organized by the CNDI

The Consiglio Nazionale delle Donne Italiane (CNDI) or National Council of Italian Women is an Italian federation of women's associations, including those admitting both men and women, bent on improving conditions for women.

Founded in 1903 as the Italian branch of the International Council of Women, it originally brought together organizations from federations representing Rome, Lombardy and Piedmont and was chaired by Gabriella Rasponi Spalletti until her death in 1931. From the beginning, the council has been open to all women, irrespective of their political or religious views. Still active today, it is involved in helping with the establishment of women's cooperatives, educating illiterate women, assisting migrants and developing the role of women in the professions. It also combats prostitution and the trafficking of women.

In 1908, the CNDI organized the Congresso Nazionale delle Donne Italiane (National Congress of Italian Women) which was attended by over 30 women's organizations from throughout Italy. It was inaugurated on 23 April by Queen Margherita with an audience which included over 1,400 women. Topics covered women's working conditions, education, health and political rights. A plenary session organized by the Comitato Nazionale Pro-Suffragio femminile (National Committee for Women's Suffrage) was centred on how parliament could be persuaded to accept voting rights for women.

In 1931, Gabriella Rasponi Spalletti was succeeded by the fascist feminist Countess Daisy di Robilant as chair of CNDI. However, the CNDI was dissolved later during the fascist period. One reason for this was sanctions on Italy by the League of Nations after the invasion of Ethiopia in 1936 but also because of antisemitic racial laws promulgated by Mussolini in 1938. In 1944, the CNDI was revived.

Over the years, it has organized many meetings on topics of interest to women, including the introduction of divorce and the reform of family law. More recently, the agenda has included professional training and employment, and how to increase women's involvement in the public sphere.

Early members of the organization included writers, teachers and suffragists such as Lavinia Taverna, Maria Pasolini Ponti, Sofia Bisi Albini, Giacinta Martini Marescotti, Maria Grassi Koenen, Virginia Nathan, Angelica Devito Tommasi, Maria Montessori and Alice Schiavoni Bosio.
