= Il Marzocco =

Weekly cultural magazine in Italy (1896–1932)

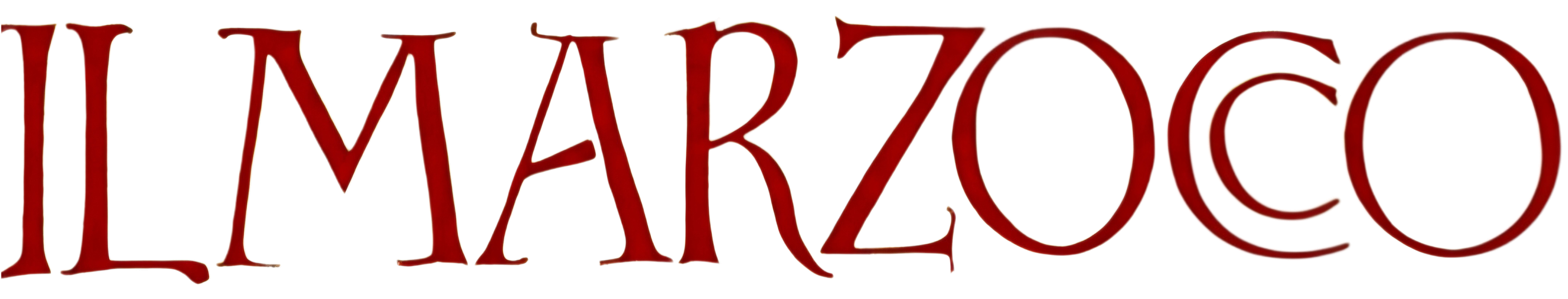
- Former editors: Adolfo Orvieto
- Categories: Cultural magazine
- Frequency: Weekly
- Founder: Angelo Orvieto; Adolfo Orvieto
- Founded: 1896
- First issue: 2 February 1896
- Final issue: 1932
- Country: Italy
- Based in: Florence
- Language: Italian
- ISSN: 0461-2388
- OCLC: 12646244

Il Marzocco was an Italian language weekly literary and art magazine which was published in Florence, Italy, between 1896 and 1932. The title was chosen by Gabriele D'Annunzio which was a reference to the symbol of the ancient Republic of Florence and also, of the popular rule. The magazine covered articles on a wide range of subjects such as women's rights and political events. Its subtitle was periodico settimanale di letteratura e d'arte (Italian: Weekly literary and arts periodical).

== History and profile ==
Il Marzocco was launched in 1896, and the first issue appeared on 2 February 1996. Angelo and Adolfo Orvieto founded the magazine that was headquartered in Florence. The magazine advocated the aestheticist approach of Gabriele D'Annunzio and an antipositivist stance until 1899. Then it supported pure literature and art opposing the decorative literature. The articles covered in the magazine appeared with photographic images. In the period 1911–1914 Il Marzocco rarely featured literary work becoming a political publication. It advocated the nationalism and war interventionism. Following the end of World War I and the start of fascist rule in Italy the magazine managed to remain untouched and was not affected from the negative effects of the press laws dated 1926.

As of 1926 Adolfo Orvieto was the editor-in-chief of Il Marzocco which was published on a weekly basis. Ada Negri, Sibilla Aleramo and Enrico Corradini were among the contributors. One of Ada Negri's articles supported the right of single women to give birth children. Corradini served as the director of the magazine and also, published political comments when he was not a well-known figure in politics. Il Marzocco praised Émile Zola as a genuine hero of modernism. Irish writer James Joyce sent a letter to Adolfo Orvieto, then director of Il Marzocco, in June 1913 and asked him to publish his article on Daniel Defoe in the magazine. Joyce's article was not accepted for publication probably due to its anti-British sentiment. Because Il Marzocco had significant numbers of British subscribers.

Il Marzocco folded in 1932. Its issues were digitized by the National Library of Italy in Rome.
