= Gnaga =

Cat-faced mask from Venice

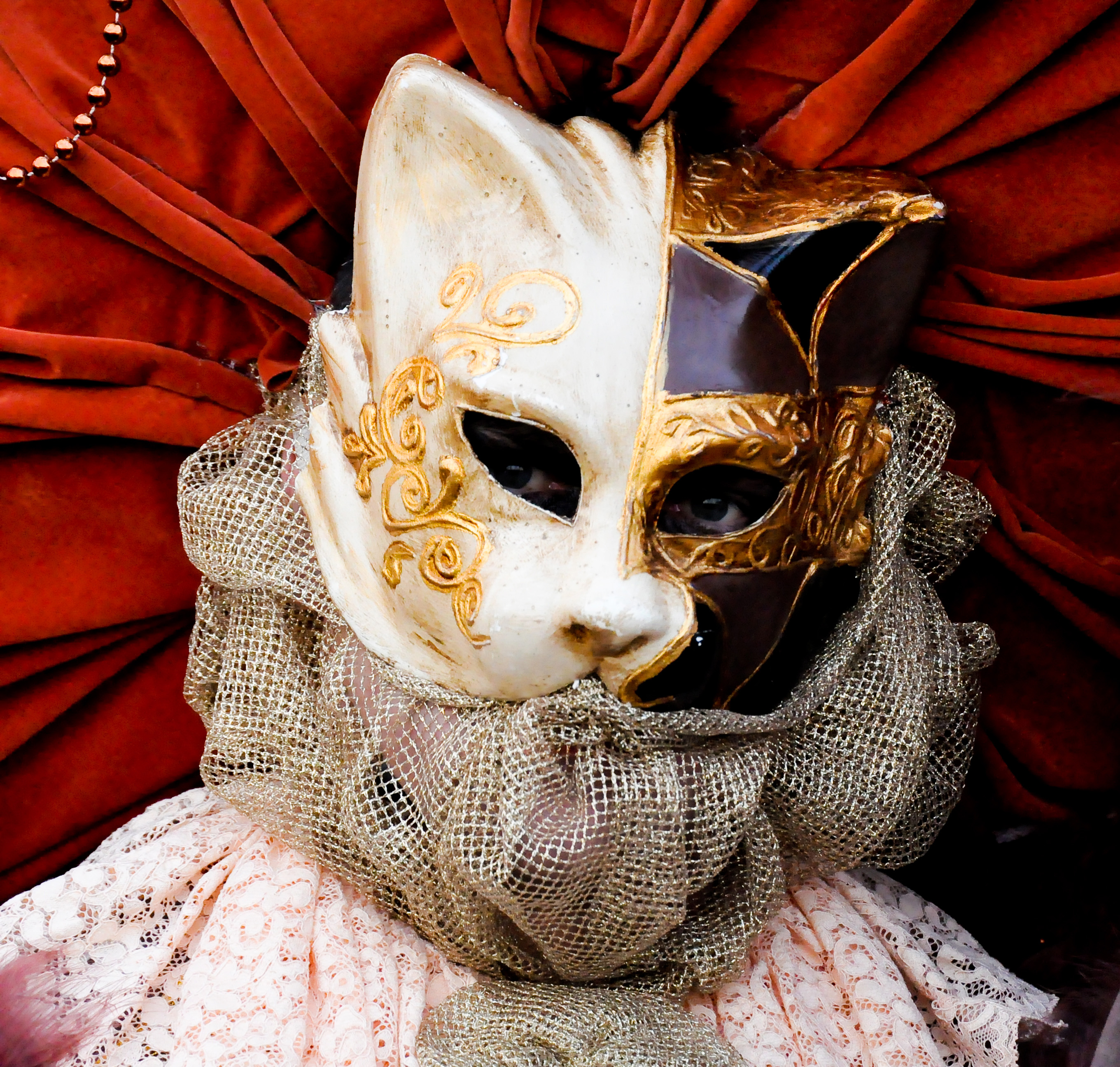
A gnaga mask at the Carnival of Venice in 2010

The gnaga (Venetian pronunciation: [ɲana]) is a type of mask originating in Venice. The mask depicts the face of a cat and was historically worn by male prostitutes and crossdressers, particularly during the Carnival of Venice. The mask covers the top half of the face and is traditionally made of papier-mâché.

== Etymology ==
The word gnaga derives from gnau, a Venetian-language onomatopoeia representing the meow of a cat. People that wear the gnaga are known as gnaghe (Venetian pronunciation: [ɲag]).

== History ==
During the 16th century in the Republic of Venice, homosexuality was illegal and punishable by death by hanging and burning in Piazza San Marco. However, Venetian law stipulated that people could not be arrested for crimes committed while performing as a masked character during the Carnival of Venice. According to local legend, male homosexual prostitutes wore cat masks and performed as women to avoid arrest for their sexuality. Gnaga performers often wore dresses and carried baskets of kittens with them. Occasionally they pretended to be nannies and carried real babies.

According to a popular story, male prostitutes were greatly popular in Venice, even outcompeting female prostitutes. It is said that in 1511, the Venetian government changed the law to allow female prostitutes to publicly display their breasts from balconies, in order to better compete with homosexuals. This change is said to have led to the naming of Ponte delle Tette (lit. 'Bridge of Bosoms') and Fondamenta delle Tette (lit. 'Bosom Street').

The gnaga mask continues to be worn at the Carnival of Venice by men dressed as women. Wearers of the mask sometimes carry a basket containing a cat, and meow at passers-by.

== See also ==
- Animal roleplay – Erotic roleplay related to BDSM
- LGBTQ history in Italy
- Pup play – Form of fetishistic animal play
