= Teatro Instabile de Venexia =

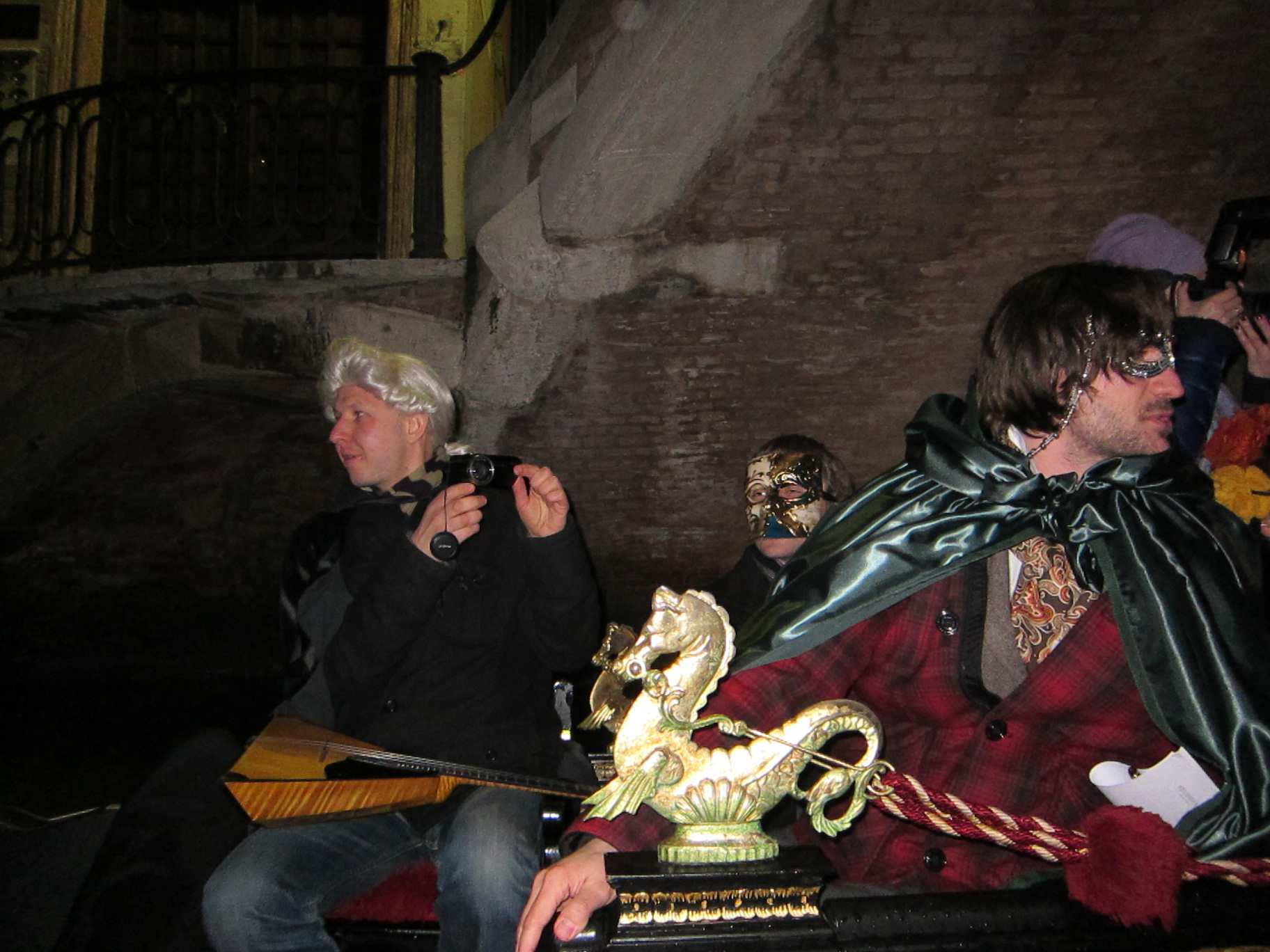
Performance during the first Tour de' Scherxi in 2011

Teatro Instabile de Venexia (Venetian for 'Unstable Theatre of Venice') is a musical street theater in gondolas with facade projections, held in Venice as part of the official program of the Carnival of Venice. It was founded in 2011 as Tour de' Scherxi ('Tour of Jokes'), by European urban historian and "urban activist" Sergey Nikitin.

The show combines a trip in a gondola along the channels and a walking tour, which include the performance of a different opera every year. Productions have been inspired by the works of Rossini, Mozart, Diaghilev, among others.

As of 2012, Nikitin was the artistic director of the event. Masks and costumes are created by young artists and architects, the last two times by Dasha Serebriakova.
