= Carnival of Venice =

Italian annual festival

Carnival of Venice Carnevale di Venezia Carnaval de Venessia
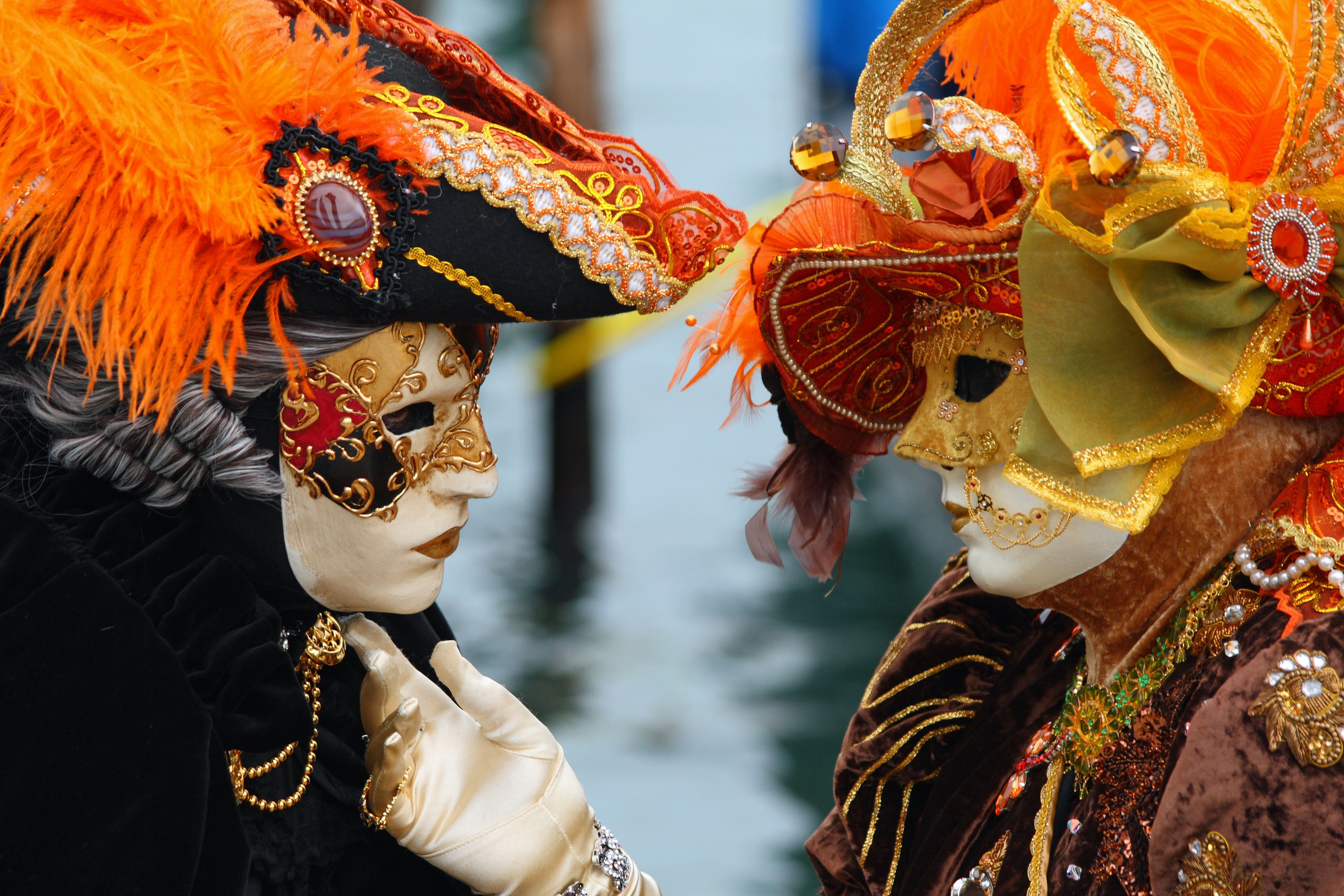
- The Venetian Carnival tradition is most famous for its distinctive masks.
- Status: Active
- Genre: Carnival
- Frequency: Annually
- Location: Venice
- Country: Italy
- Inaugurated: 1979 (modern event)
- Founder: City of Venice
- Attendance: Up to 3 million

The Carnival of Venice (Italian: Carnevale di Venezia; Venetian: Carnaval de Venessia) is an annual festival held in Venice, Italy, famous for its elaborate costumes and masks. The Carnival ends on Shrove Tuesday (Martedì Grasso or Mardi Gras), which is the day before the start of Lent on Ash Wednesday.

The Carnival traces its origins to the Middle Ages, existing for several centuries until it was abolished in 1797. The tradition was revived in 1979, and the modern event now attracts approximately 3 million visitors annually.

== History ==
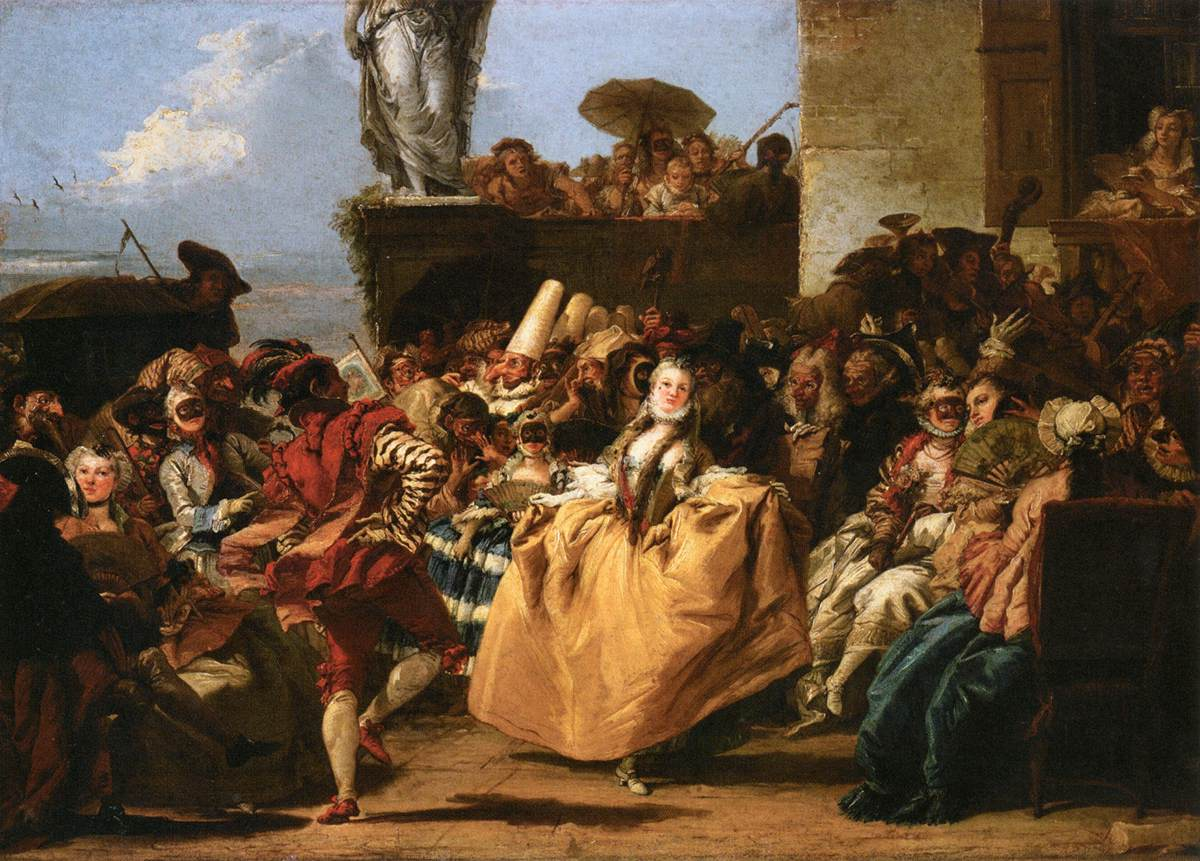
Carnival in Venice, by Giovanni Domenico Tiepolo, 1750

According to legend, the Carnival of Venice began after the military victory of the Venetian Republic over the patriarch of Aquileia, Ulrich II, in the year 1162. In honour of this, the people started to dance and gather in St Mark's Square. Apparently, this festival started in that period and became official during the Renaissance. In the 17th century, the Baroque Carnival preserved the prestigious image of Venice in the world. It was very famous during the 18th century. It encouraged licence and pleasure, but it was also used to protect Venetians from present and future anguish. However, under the rule of Emperor Francis II, the festival was outlawed entirely in 1797 and the use of masks became strictly forbidden. It reappeared gradually in the 19th century, but only for short periods and above all for private feasts, where it became an occasion for artistic creations.

After a long absence, the Carnival returned in 1979. The Italian government decided to bring back the history and culture of Venice and sought to use the traditional Carnival as the centrepiece of its efforts. The redevelopment of the masks began as the pursuit of some Venetian college students for the tourist trade. Since then, approximately 3 million visitors have been coming to Venice every year for the Carnival. One of the most important events is the contest for la maschera più bella ("the most beautiful mask"), which is judged by a panel of international costume and fashion designers. Since 2007 the winners have been:

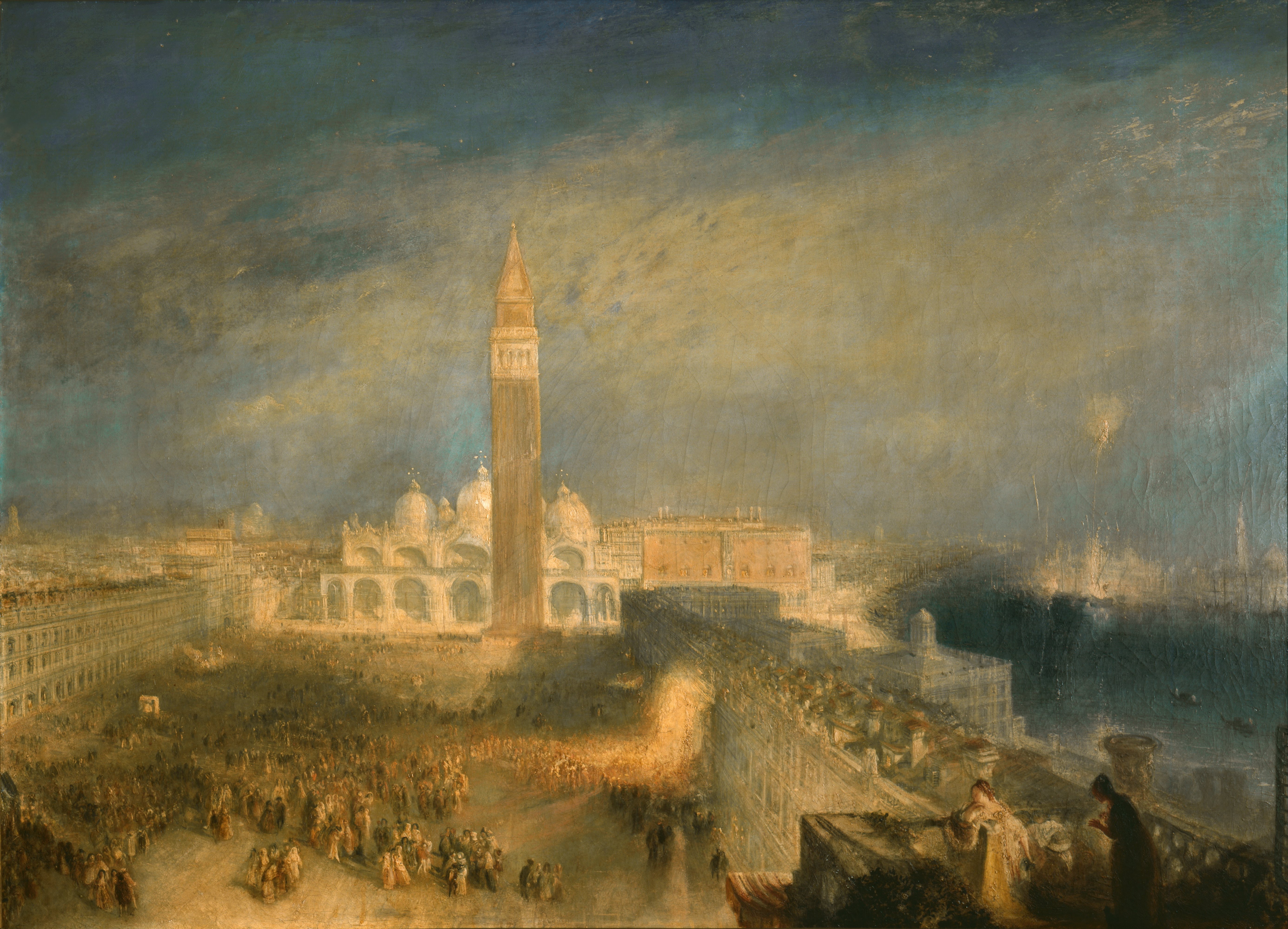
Juliet and her Nurse by J. M. W. Turner, 1863

- 2007: La Mongolfiera by Tanja Schulz-Hess.
- 2008: Luna park by Tanja Schulz-Hess.
- 2009: The voyages of Marco Polo by Horst Raack and Tanja Schulz-Hess.
- 2010: Pantegane from England.
- 2011: La famille Fabergé by Horst Raack, and Ommagio a Venezia by Paolo and Cinzia Pagliasso and Anna Rotonaia, best costume for the official theme 19th century by Lea Luongsoredju and Roudi Verbaanderd.
- 2012: Il servizio da thè del settecento (teatime) by Horst Raack, most creative costume Oceano by Jacqueline Spieweg.
- 2013: Alla Ricerca del Tempo Perduto by Anna Marconi, most colourful costume Luna Park.
- 2014: Una giornata in campagna by Horst Raack, and Radice Madre by Maria Roan di Villavera.
- 2015: Le stelle dell'amore by Horst Raack, best costume for the official theme La regina della cucina veneziana by Tanja Schulz-Hess, most creative costume Monsieur Sofa et Madame Coco by Lorenzo Marconi.
- 2016: I bagnanti di Senigallia by Anna and Lorenzo Marconi, best costume for the official theme I caretti siciliani by Salvatore Occhipinti and Guglielmo Miceli.
- 2017: Il signore del bosco by Luigi di Como.
- 2018: L'amore al tempo del campari by Paolo Brando.
- 2019: I bambini della luce by Horst Raack, best traditional costume matrimonio all'italiana by Borboni si Nasce, most original costume Paguri by Nicola Pignoli and Ilaria Cavalli.

In February 2020, the Governor of Veneto Luca Zaia announced the decision to call off the Carnival celebrations in an attempt to contain the spread of the coronavirus disease.

- 2022: Dragon Baby by Cinzia Mandrelli from Rimini and her brother Piersante.
- 2023: Astrostar by Karen Duthoit. Second was 4 elements: fire, air, earth, water by Alissa Karaeva from Pesaro, and third was Processione a San Marco by Simone Fracca from Bologna.

== Carnival masks ==
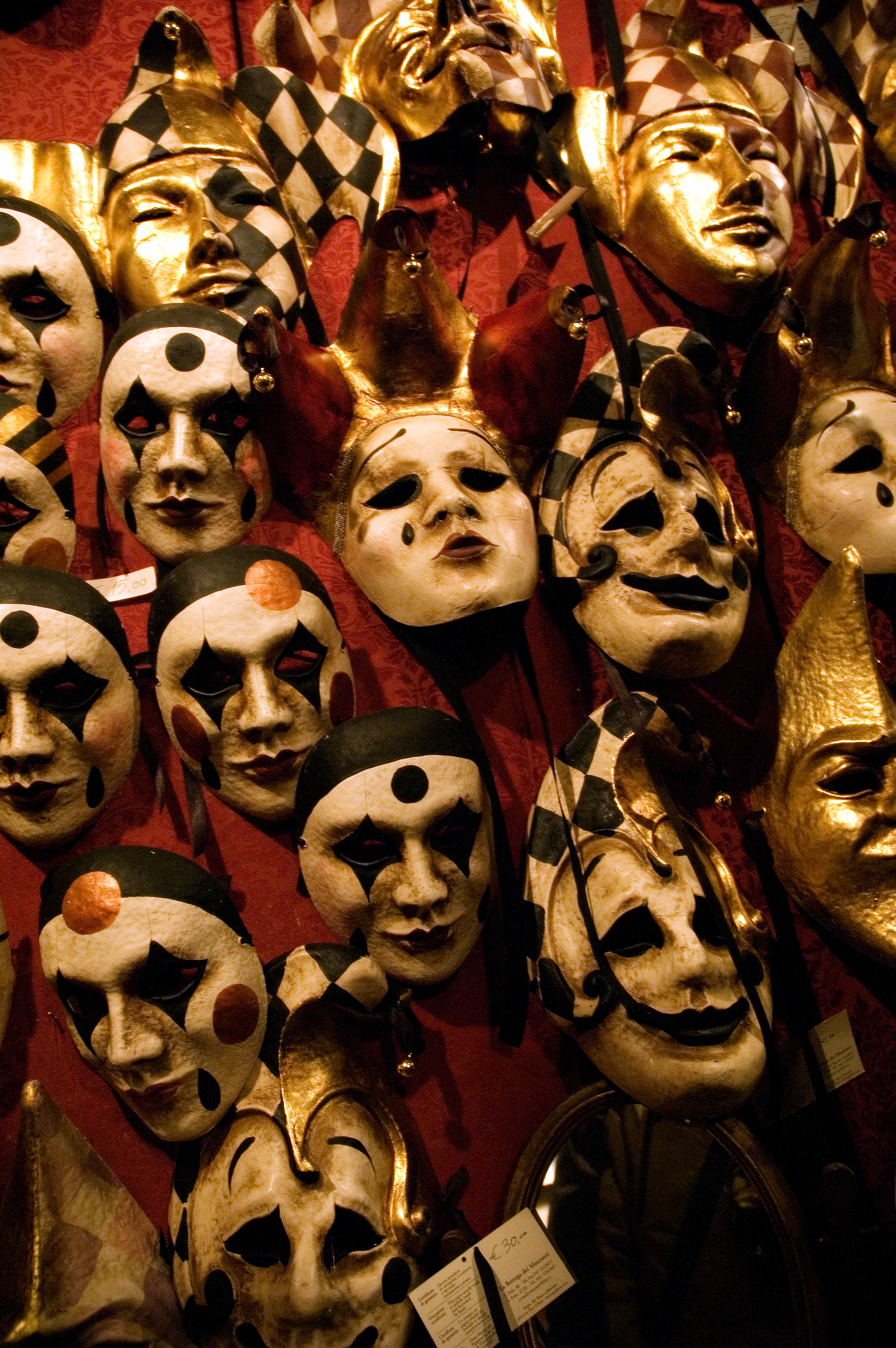
Typical masks worn at the Venice Carnival, which portray the satirical and exaggerated appearances often used

Masks have always been an important feature of the Venetian Carnival. Traditionally, people were allowed to wear them between the festival of Santo Stefano (Saint Stephen's Day, 26 December) and the end of the Carnival season at midnight of Shrove Tuesday (movable, but during February or early March). As masks were also allowed on Ascension and from 5 October to Christmas, people could spend a large portion of the year in disguise.

Maskmakers (mascherari) enjoyed a special position in society, with their own laws and their own guild, with their own statute dated 10 April 1436. Mascherari belonged to the fringe of painters and were helped in their task by sign-painters who drew faces onto plaster in a range of different shapes and paying extreme attention to detail.

Venetian masks can be made of leather or porcelain, or by using the original glass technique. The original masks were rather simple in design and decoration, and often had a symbolic and practical function. Nowadays, most Italian masks are made with the application of gesso and gold leaf and are hand-painted, using natural feathers and gems to decorate. However, this makes them rather expensive when compared to the widespread, low-quality masks produced abroad. This competition accelerates the decline of this historical craftsmanship, particular to the city of Venice.

Several distinct styles of masks are worn in the Venice Carnival, some with identifying names. People with different occupations wore different masks.

=== Origin ===
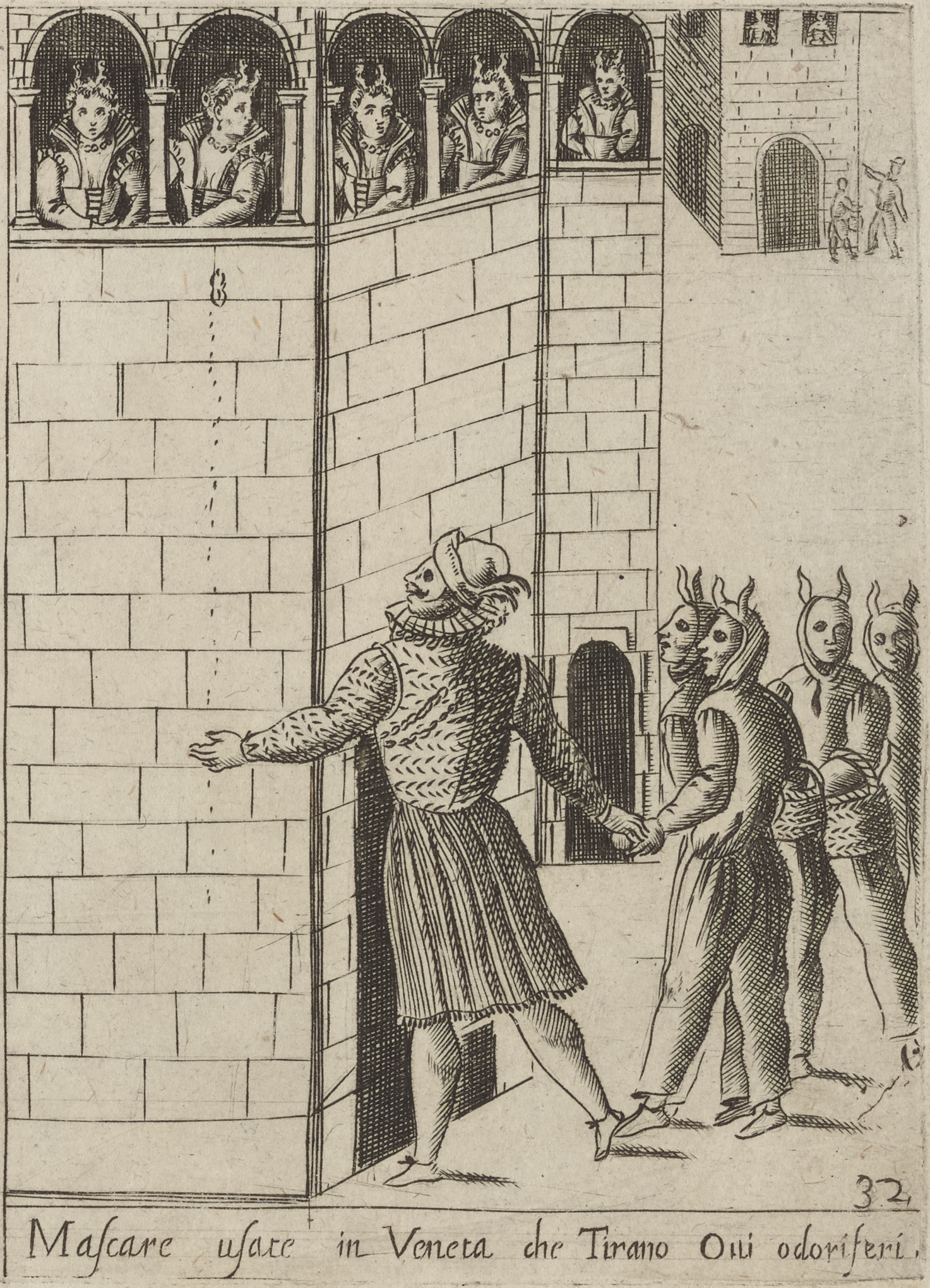
Masked men threw eggshells filled with perfume during carnival.

There is less evidence explaining the motive for the earliest mask being worn in Venice. One scholar argues that covering the face in public was a uniquely Venetian response to one of the most rigid class hierarchies in European history. During Carnival, the sumptuary laws were suspended, and people could dress as they liked, instead of according to the rules that were set down in law for their profession and social class.

The first documented sources mentioning the use of masks in Venice can be found as far back as the 13th century. The Great Council made it a crime for masked people to throw scented eggs. These ovi odoriferi were eggshells that were usually filled with rose water perfume, and tossed by young men at their friends or at young women they admired. However, in some cases, the eggs were filled with ink or other damaging substances. Gambling in public was normally illegal, except during Carnival; the Great Council document decrees that masked persons were forbidden to gamble.

Another law in 1339 forbade Venetians from wearing vulgar disguises and visiting convents while masked. The law also prohibited painting one's face or wearing false beards or wigs.

Near the end of the Republic, the wearing of masks in daily life was severely restricted. By the 18th century, it was limited only to about three months from 26 December. The masks were traditionally worn with decorative beads matching in colour.

=== Bauta ===
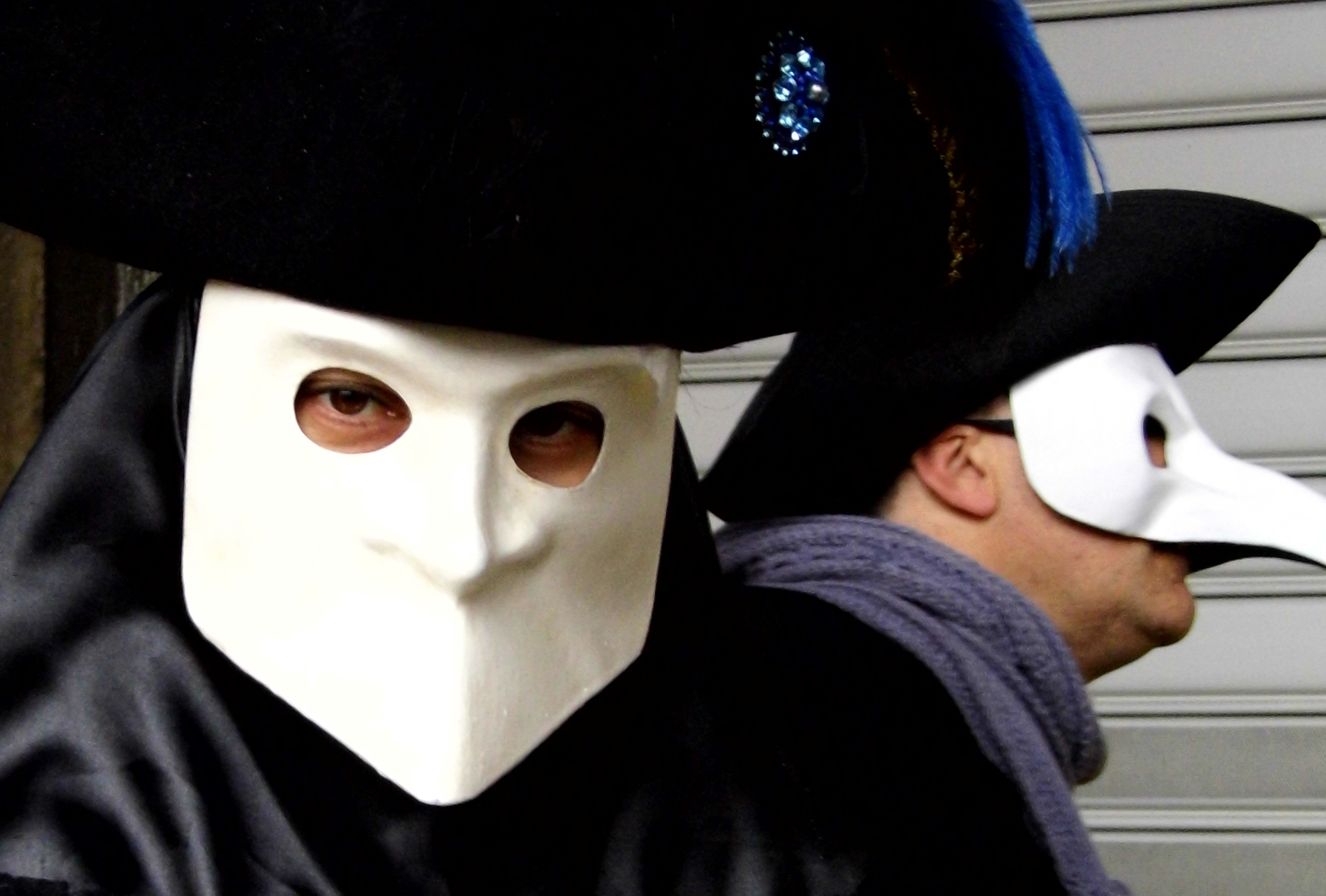
Simple bauta mask with black zendale and tricorne; in background, Zanni or Pantalone mask

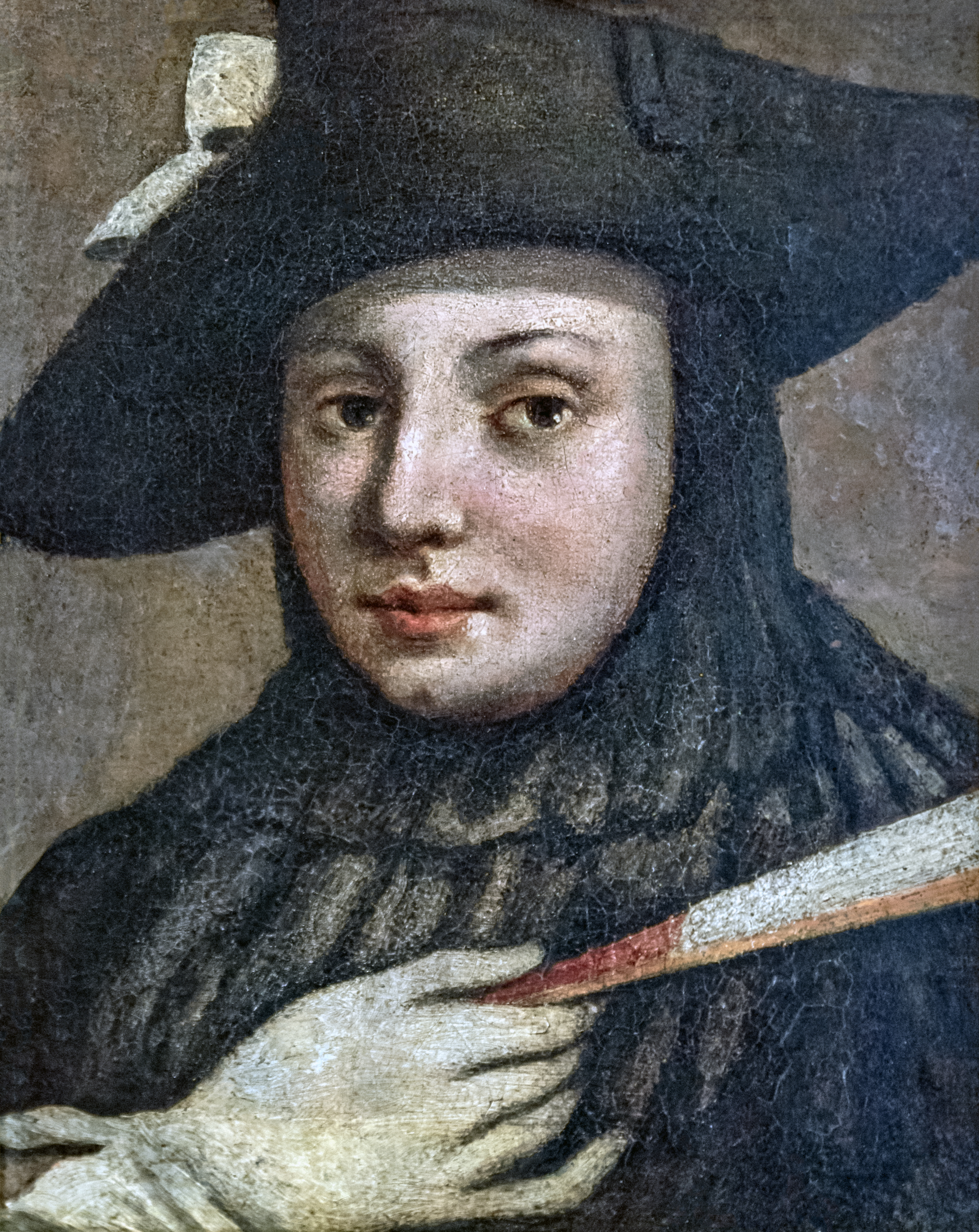
Woman of the Bautta, by Alessandro Longhi, circa. late 1700s. Her mask is resting on her hat.

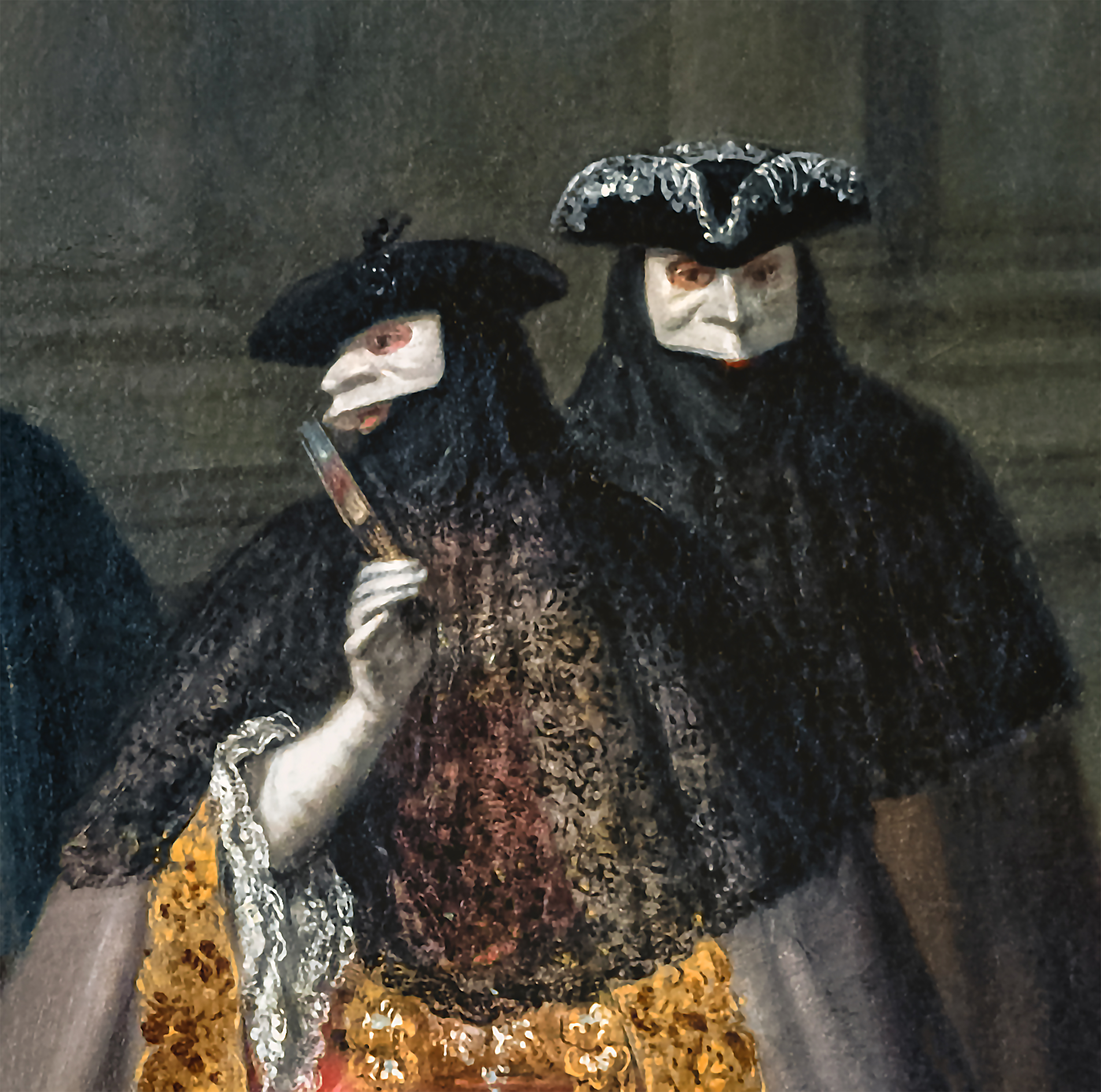
Conversation of the masks, by Pietro Longhi, detail. A man and a woman, both wearing bauta: bauta masks, black tricorn hats, grey tabarros, and black zendales.

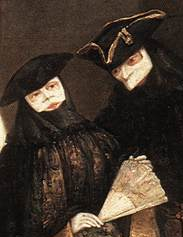
A man and a woman in bauta masks. The woman's mouth is just visible under the beak of the mask.

The bauta (sometimes referred as baùtta) is a mask, today often heavily gilded, although originally simple stark white, which is designed to comfortably cover the entire face; this traditional grotesque piece of art was characterized by the inclusion of an over-prominent nose, a thick supraorbital ridge, a projecting "chin line", and no mouth. The mask's beak-like chin is designed to enable the wearer to talk, eat, and drink without having to remove it, thereby preserving the wearer's anonymity. The bauta was often accompanied by a red or black cape and a tricorn.

In the 18th century, together with a black circular or semicircular clasped cape called a tabarro (and zendale hood), the bauta had become a standardised society mask and disguise regulated by the Venetian government. It was obligatory to wear it at certain political decision-making events when all citizens were required to act anonymously as peers. Only citizens (i.e., men) had the right to use the bauta. Its role was similar to the anonymizing processes invented to guarantee general, direct, free, equal and secret ballots in modern democracies. Also, the bearing of weapons along with the mask was specifically prohibited by law and enforceable by the Venetian police.

Given this history and its grotesque design elements, the bauta was usually worn by men, but many paintings done in the 18th century also depict women wearing this mask and tricorn hat. The Ridotto and The Perfume Seller by Pietro Longhi are two examples of this from the 1750s.

=== Colombina ===
The Colombina (also known as Columbine) is a half-mask, only covering the wearer's eyes, nose, and upper cheeks. It is often highly decorated with gold, silver, crystals, and feathers. It is held up to the face by a baton or is tied with ribbon as with most other Venetian masks. The Colombina mask is named after a stock character in the commedia dell'arte: Colombina was a maidservant and soubrette who was an adored part of the Italian theatre for generations. It is said it was designed for an actress because she did not wish to have her beautiful face completely covered. In fact, the Colombina is entirely a modern creation. There are no historic paintings depicting its use on the stage or in social life.

While both men and women now wear this mask, it began as a woman's analog to the bauta.

=== Gnaga ===
During the 16th century in the Republic of Venice, homosexuality was illegal and punishable by death by hanging and burning in Piazza San Marco. However, Venetian law stipulated that people could not be punished for crimes committed while performing as a masked character during the Carnival. In order to practice prostitution without fear of punishment, male homosexual prostitutes wore cat masks, called gnaga, and performed as women. These prostitutes often wore dresses and carried baskets of kittens with them.

The gnaga mask continues to be worn at the Carnival of Venice by men dressed as women. Wearers of the mask typically behave like female commoners, meowing mockingly at passers-by. People that wear the gnaga are known as gnaghe.

=== Medico Della Peste ("The Plague Doctor") ===
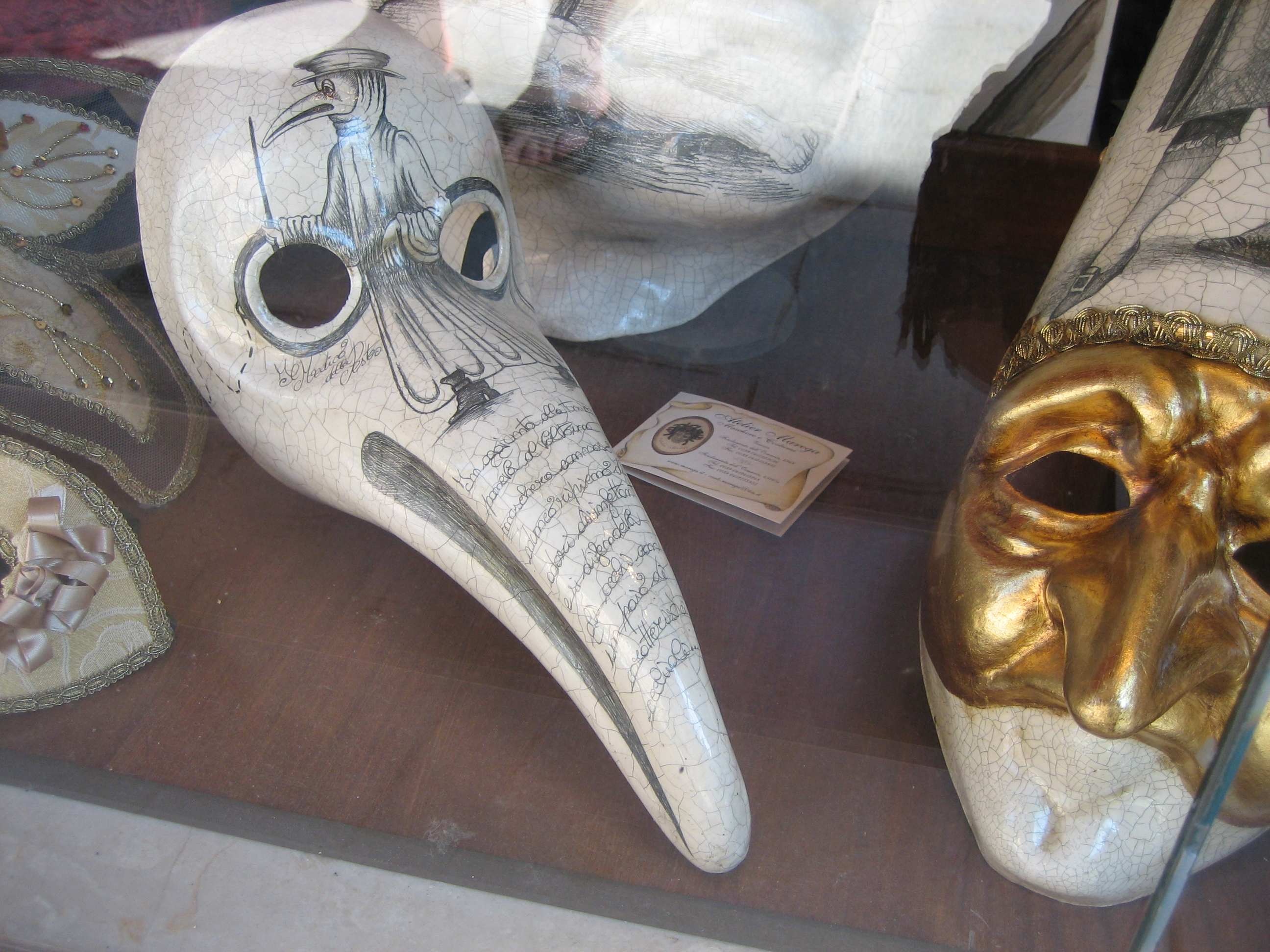
A Medico della Peste mask

The Medico della Peste ("The Plague Doctor" in English), with its long beak, is one of the most bizarre and recognizable of the Venetian masks, although it did not start as a Carnival mask at all but as a method of preventing the spread of disease. The striking design originates from 17th century French physician Charles de Lorme who adopted the mask together with other sanitary precautions while treating plague victims. The mask is often white, consisting of a hollow beak and round eyeholes covered with crystal discs, creating a bespectacled effect. Its use as a Carnival mask is entirely a modern convention and today these masks are often much more decorative. Although the mask and costume are worn almost exclusively by males, the enhancement in decoration also suggests that women are now more probably to wear the mask and costume than in previous years at the Carnival.

The plague doctors who followed De Lorme's example wore the usual black hat and long black cloak as well as the mask, white gloves and a staff (so as to be able to move patients without having to come into physical contact with them). They hoped these precautions would prevent them from contracting the disease. The mask was originally beaked with a purpose in congruence with the miasmatic theory of disease practiced at that time: the hollow beak allowed for the containment of flowers and other sweet-smelling substances designed to keep away the foul odours that were thought to spread infection. Those who wear the plague doctor mask often also wear the associated clothing of the plague doctor. The popularity of the Medico della peste among carnival celebrants can be seen as a memento mori.

=== Moretta / servetta muta ===
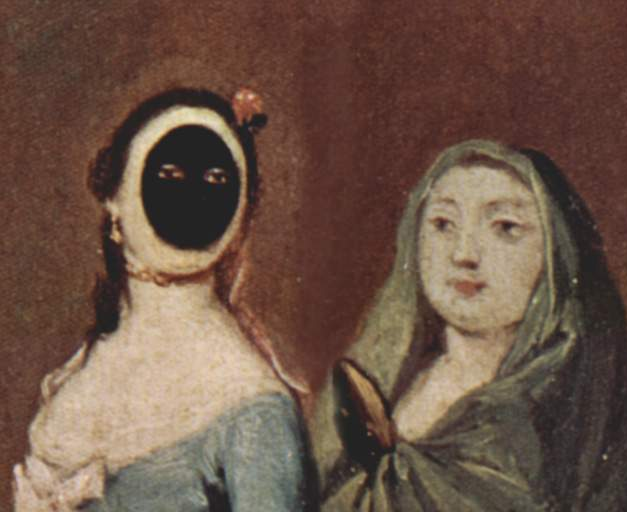
Woman wearing a moretta, and another holding one, in Pietro Longhi's The Rhinoceros

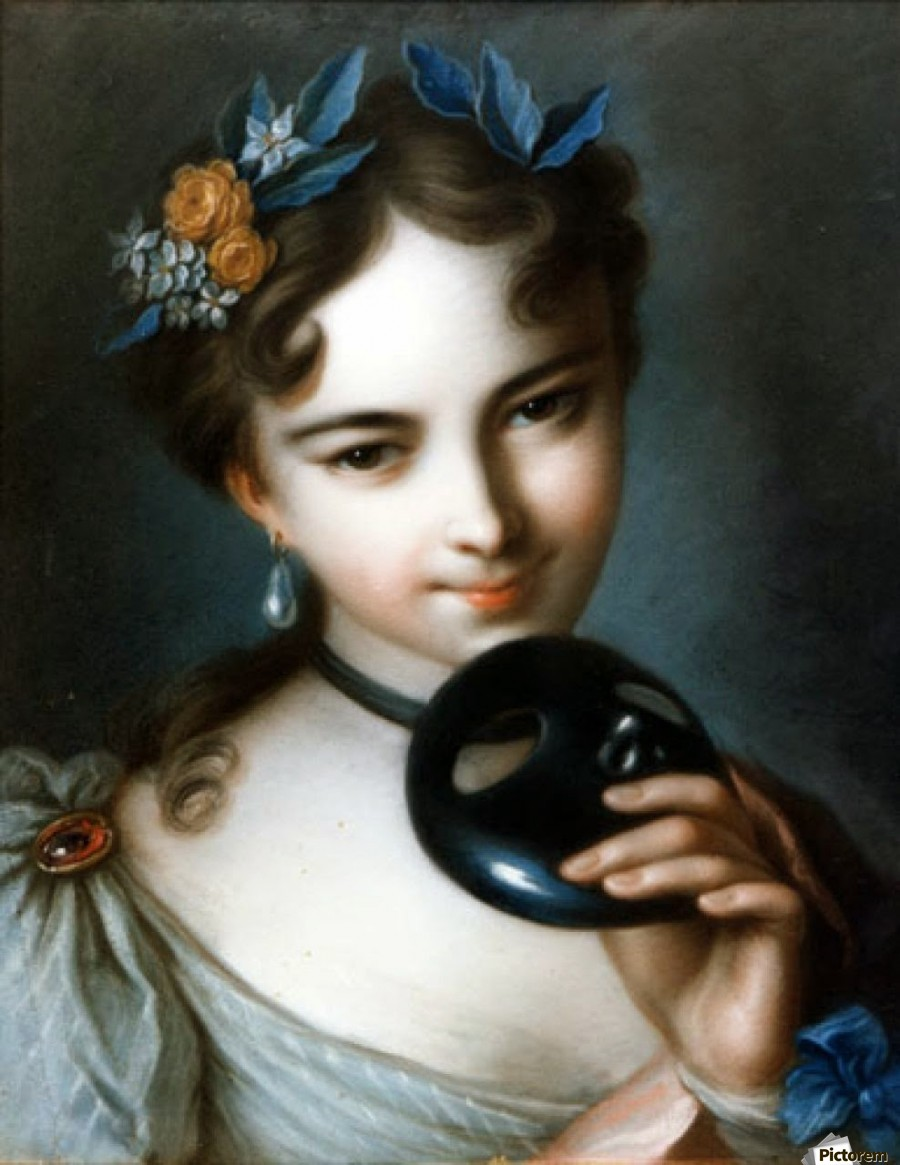
Closer view, in a 1745 portrait

The moretta ("dark one" in English) or servetta muta ("mute servant woman" in English) was a small strapless black velvet oval mask with wide eyeholes and no lips or mouth worn by patrician women. It derived from the visard mask invented in France in the 16th century, but differed in not having a hole to speak through. The mask was only just large enough to conceal a woman's identity and was held in place by the wearer biting on a button or bit (the women wearing this mask were unable to speak, hence muta) and was often finished off with a veil. The Rhinoceros by Pietro Longhi depicts this mask in use in 1751. It fell into disuse about 1760.

=== Volto (larva) ===
The volto ("face" in English) or larva ("ghost" in English) is the iconic modern Venetian mask: it is often made of stark white porcelain or thick plastic, although also frequently gilded and decorated, and is commonly worn with a tricorn and cloak. The volto is also quite heavier than a typical mask and has a much tighter fit; many people who experience claustrophobia do not wear the volto at the Carnival. If worn by a woman, who are the most common wearers of the volto at the modern festival, it is typically worn with a headdress, scarf, veil, another mask, or a combination of all four. It is secured in the back with a ribbon. Unlike the moretta muta, the volto covers the entire face of the wearer, including the whole of the chin. Unlike a typical mask, it also extends farther back to just before the ears and upwards to the top of the forehead; also unlike the moretta muta, it depicts the nose and lips in simple facial expressions. Unlike the bauta, the volto cannot be worn while eating and drinking because the coverage of the chin and cheeks is too complete and tight (although the jaw on some original commedia masks was hinged, this is not a commedia mask and so is never hinged — the lips are always sealed).

=== Pantalone ===
Another classic character from the Italian stage, Pantalone, possibly stemming from the Italian pianta il leone referencing the conquests of Venice and the origin of this character, is usually represented as a sad old man with an oversized nose like the beak of a crow with high brows and slanted eyes (meant to signify intelligence on the stage). Like other commedia masks, Pantalone is also a half mask. This mask is almost exclusively worn by men, although its popularity at modern festivals has declined.

=== Arlecchino ===
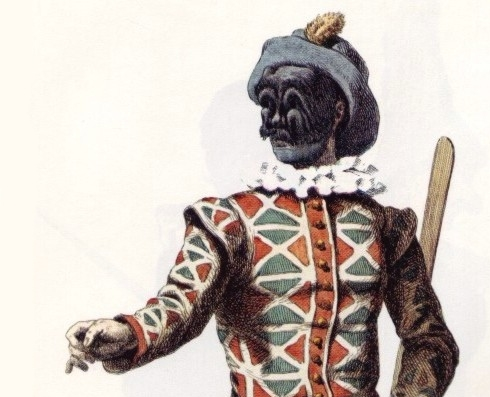
Arlecchino's half-mask is painted black with an ape-like nose and a "bump" to signify a devil's horn.

Arlecchino ("Harlequin" in English) is a Zanni character of the commedia. He is meant to be a type of "noble savage", devoid of reason and full of emotion, a peasant, a servant, even a slave. His originally wooden and later leather half-mask, painted black, depicts him as having a short, wide nose, a set of wide, round, arching eyebrows, a rounded beard, and always a "bump" upon his forehead meant to signify a devil's horn. He is a theatrical counterpoint to and often servant of Pantalone, and the two characters often appeared together on the stage.

=== Zanni ===
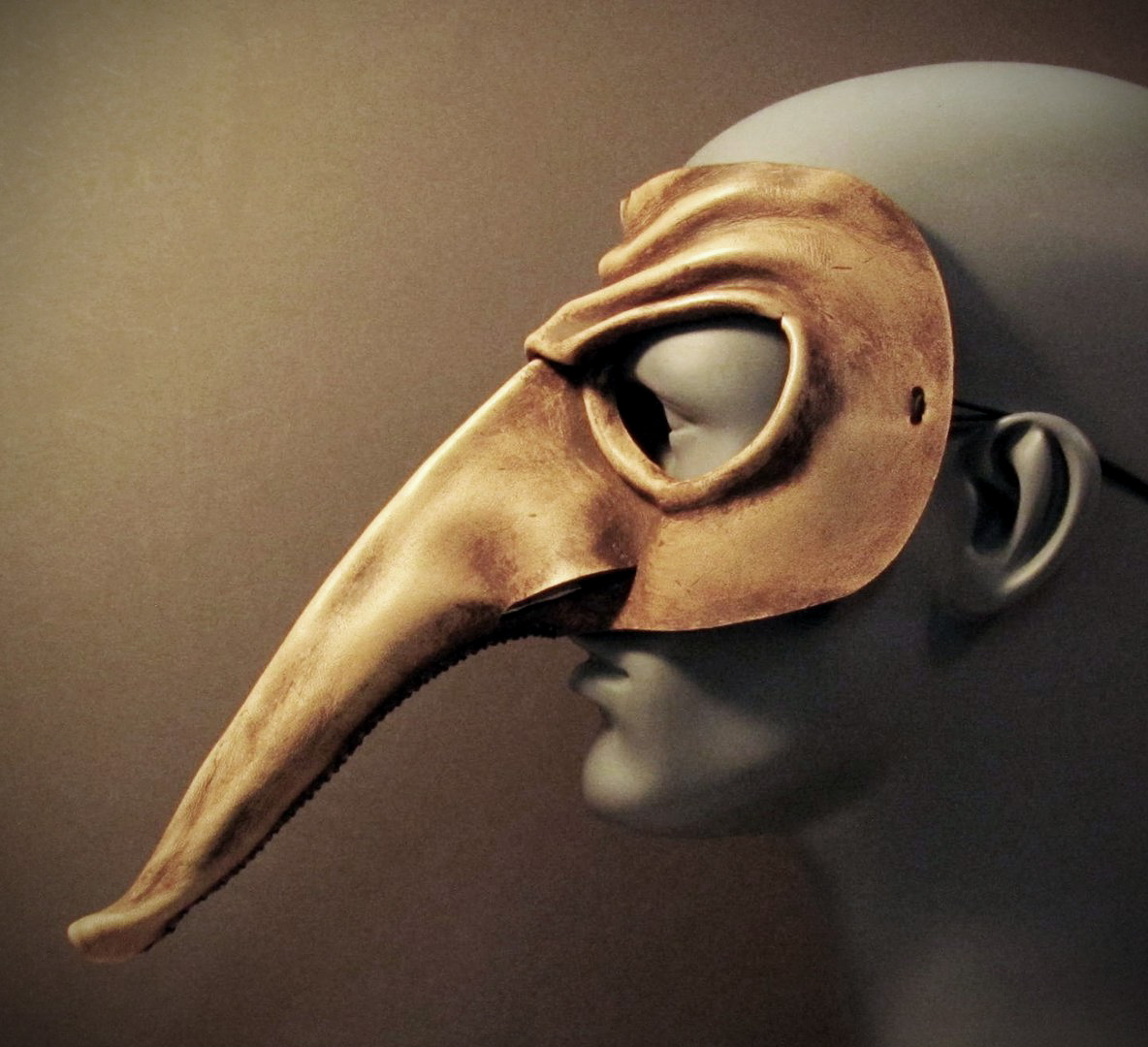
A leather version of a Zanni mask, profile view

The Zanni class of characters is another classic of the stage. Their half mask is in leather, presenting themselves with a low forehead, bulging eyebrows and a long nose with a reverse curve towards the end. It is said that the longer the nose, the more stupid the character. The low forehead is also seen as a sign of stupidity. The Zanni are often the supporting characters in a commedia performance, often fulfilling similar societal roles as Arlecchino, although with smaller parts.

== In culture ==
The short story The Cask of Amontillado, written by Edgar Allan Poe, is set in Venice during the carnival.

The Bauta mask and accompanying costume is worn by the antagonist in the film Amadeus (1984), and is prominently featured on the film's poster and visual identity.

Venetian masks feature prominently in the films Eyes Wide Shut and Marco Bellocchio's The Witches' Sabbath. Stores that supplied the masks include both Ca' Macana and Il Canovaccio in Venice.

The 9th Sequence of the story of Assassin's Creed II is also set in the Carnival of Venice in the year of 1486.

The song "Carnival of Venice" was popularized by violinist and composer Niccolò Paganini, who wrote twenty variations on the original tune.

== See also ==
- Commedia dell'arte
- Teatro Instabile de Venexia
