= Pup play =

Form of fetishistic animal play

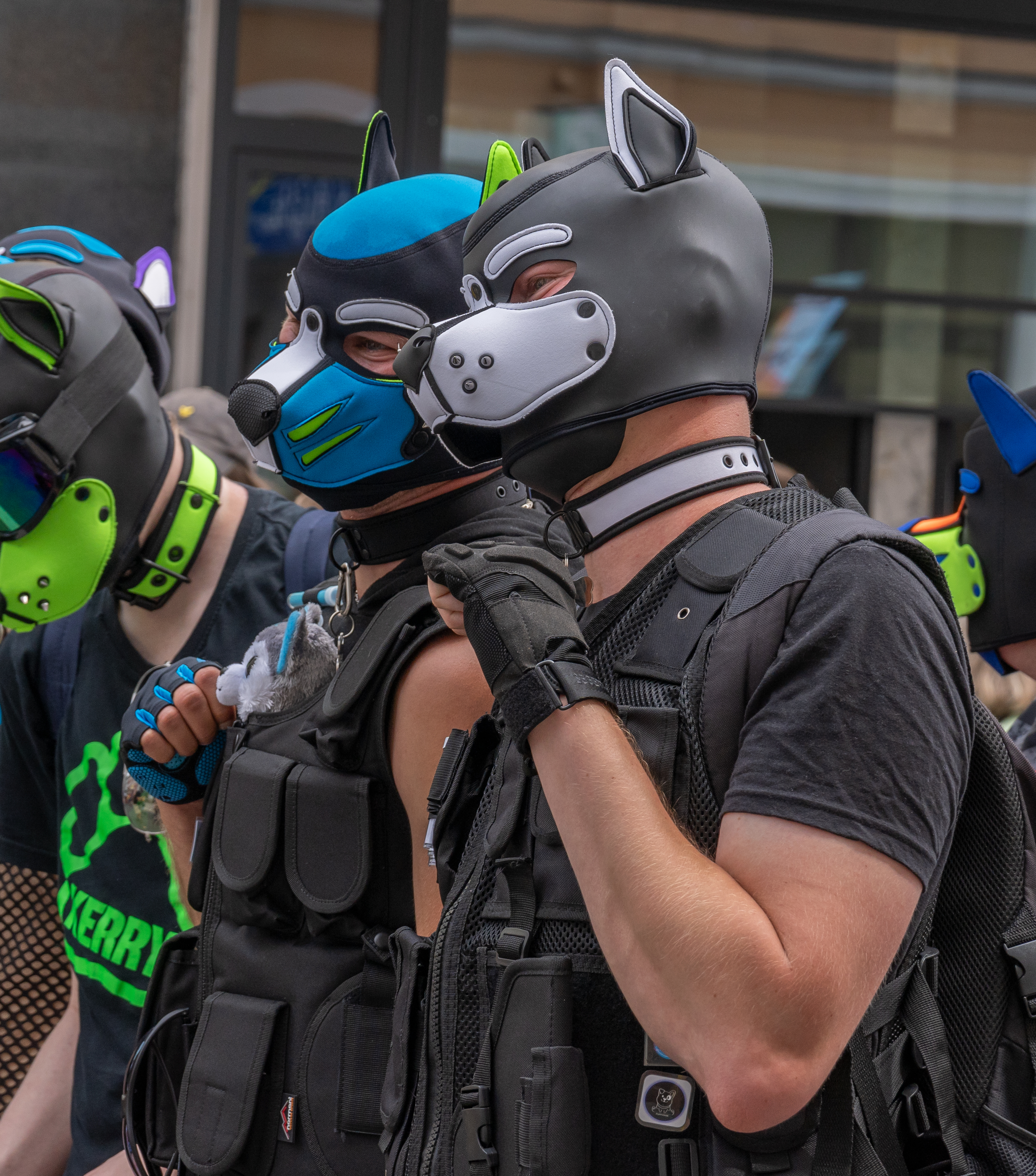
Two pups (in pup hoods) attending Christopher Street Day in Hof, Germany

Pup play, or puppy play, is a form of fetishistic animal play where participants adopt a canine personality known as "pups", through apparel and dog-like behaviors.

== Overview ==
Puppy play is defined as "a sociosexual activity wherein one or more participants take on the mannerisms, behavior, and attitudes of a dog – often facilitated by the wearing of specialist 'gear'". This can include both physical apparel and behavioral traits, such as communicating via non-verbal cues such as growling or barking.

Pup play culture is closely linked to the leather subculture and BDSM communities, with much of the apparel and accessories crafted from leather, rubber, latex, or neoprene.

While the culture is categorized as a fetish, it can also serve as a social outlet for many individuals, particularly within the LGBTQ+ community.

== Features ==
In puppy play, or pup play, at least one of the participants acts out canine mannerisms and behaviors. If there is a dominant role it can be taken by a "handler," "trainer," "master," or in the case of someone who also identifies as a pup, an "alpha". Not all "pups" or "dogs" identify as "alpha"; some consider themselves "beta" or "omega". In the context of the pup community, "beta" can refer to someone who has both dominant and submissive or service oriented tendencies depending on the situation where "omega" generally indicates a more submissive, passive, service oriented and playful nature. Unlike other forms of animal roleplay, it is not uncommon for two or more pups to play together as equals, possibly fight for dominance, or play where one is clearly the "alpha". Pups may often be collared by their partners; an uncollared or unowned pup may call themselves a "stray."

Puppy play is often about being playful, mischievous, and instinctive. Many human puppies like to simplify their desires and motivations as they embrace the side of themselves that acts solely on instinct. Many pups enter a form of subspace known as "pup space," which is a state of mind that allows pups to let go of their human persona and act more like a dog. A great deal of animal role play occurs socially. A group of like-minded pet-players will gather at events specifically organized for social pet play. At pup play events, for example, which occur all over the world, human puppies will act like biological puppies, relaxing, playing fetch, and interacting with human handlers.

Other elements rooted in BDSM play involve bondage and restriction with collars, leashes, kneepads, harnesses, rubber suits, hoods (optional, but may assist with headspace) and mitts (which restrict finger usage). Both sexual and non-sexual services are options that occur in the scene and should be discussed by the participants (pup / handler, beta / alpha, etc.) ahead of time so expectations are not misinterpreted. "Training" may take place in order to teach commands or tricks if both participants desire such interactions.

== Demographics ==
According to Wignall et al. (2022), data was collected from a 2019 survey designed and organized by the Australian non-profit Nerdy Doggo. The survey gathered data from various social media platforms popular with pups, including Twitter, Facebook, Telegram, and WhatsApp. The data showed that homosexual males made up approximately 60.3% (442) of the sampled 733 participants, with 58.1% (426) of them aged 18–30 years, and the remaining 41.9% (307) being older than 30 years. Of the participants, 666 (90.9%) reported owning gear related to pup play, with 600 (81.9%) of those owning pup hoods.

Wignall et al. (2023) sampled 413 pup play practitioners from an international internet survey with the aim to "examine the occurrence of autistic traits and explore characteristics and social connections of people with autistic traits who engage in pup play". Participants' autistic traits were assessed using the Autism-Spectrum Quotient (short form). The survey found that the average score for autistic traits was 65.83, with a range from 29 to 100. Out of the 413 participants, 35.4% (146) scored above 70, which is considered a higher threshold for indicating stronger autistic traits. Additionally, 55.7% (230) of the participants scored 65 or above, which is considered a lower threshold for identifying autistic traits.

== See also ==
- Gnaga
