= Margherita Ancona =

Italian teacher and suffragist

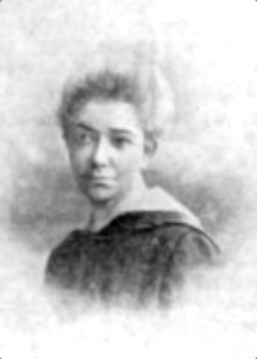
- Ancona in 1923
- Born: 3 September 1881; Palermo, Sicily, Kingdom of Italy
- Died: 1966 (aged 84–85); Milan, Italy
- Occupation: teacher

Margherita Ancona (3 September 1881 – 1966) was an Italian teacher and active in the women's suffrage movement in Milan. She was the secretary and later president of the radical bourgeois Comitato lombardo pro suffragio (Lombard Suffrage Committee) and member of the Italian branch of the International Woman Suffrage Alliance (IWSA). One of the leaders of the Italian women's suffrage campaigns, she was the only Italian woman to serve in her era on the board of the IWSA and was as a delegate to the Inter-Allied Women's Conference of 1919.

== Early life ==
Margherita Ancona was born, as a twin with her sister Luisa, on 3 September 1881 in Palermo, on the island of Sicily in the Kingdom of Italy to Maria (née Basevi) and Camillo Ancona. Her family were of Jewish heritage. After attending gymnasium studying the classics in Messina in 1901, the twins relocated to Milan to further their education and became some of the first women graduates in Italy. Luisa was the second woman to enter university studies in Italy, behind Maria Montessori, and would become an eye doctor.

== Career ==
Ancona became a teacher of letters at the Liceo Cesare Beccaria and was a strong advocate for women's suffrage, belonging to the Comitato Pro-Voto Milanese (Milanese Pro-Voting Committee). Lombardy was the center of the early feminist movement in Italy, as after the Italian unification, women who had previously had the right to vote under Austrian rule of the Kingdom of Lombardy–Venetia, lost their enfranchisement. In 1906, when Montessori wrote a proclamation favoring women's suffrage, committees in favor sprung up throughout the country, Maria Cabrini, Carlotta Clerici, Ersilia Majno, Linda Malnati, and Nina Rignano were some of the founding members of the Comitato Pro-Voto Milanese, for which Ancona would become secretary. She also joined the Associazione per la donna (Association for Women), attending the conference hosted by the organization in Rome in October 1917, where she presented a paper on the state of suffrage in Italy.

Ancona believed that the vote was essential for women to attain social and economic reforms and expressed her views in the January 1919 edition of the journal Attività femminile sociale (Women's Social Activity). In February 1919, she attended the Inter-Allied Women's Conference hosted in Paris, which opened on the 10th, to develop women's topics for the Paris Peace Conference. By June 1919, she was serving as president of the Lombard Suffrage Committee and urging lawmakers to amend the law on women's emancipation. Publishing articles in the journal Voce nuova (New Voice), Ancona espoused a liberal suffragism, which rejected nationalism and racism. When the paper began publishing articles by Teresa Labriola, a feminist in favor of Italian national expansion and racial superiority, Ancona withdrew from further collaboration with the publication.

Ancona was the opening speaker of the Suffrage Conference hosted in Milan between 23 and 29 April 1920, which called together prominent men from all of Italy's political parties to discuss women's enfranchisement. At the Eighth Conference of the International Woman Suffrage Alliance, hosted in June 1920 in Geneva, Ancona became the first Italian woman elected to serve on the IWSA board. That same year, when the International Federation of University Women was founded in London, she pressed for the Italians to organize a chapter. The first three organizational meetings were held in Rome, another in 1922 and by 1923, first federal assembly of the La Federazione Italiana e Laureate Diplomate Istituti Superiori (FILDIS) (Federation of Italian Women Graduates and Diplomates) was held and bylaws adopted. The group was an affiliate of the Consiglio Nazionale delle Donne Italiane (National Council of Italian Women) and worked both to promote women's professionalism and to open educational and employment opportunities to women.

In 1923, Ancona was elected to the post of vice president on the international board and was the only Italian woman to have held such a high post in the IWSA. Her influence and regular correspondence on the vigorous campaign for enfranchisement in Italy, led to the selection of Rome as host for the 9th IWSA Conference. Ancona and Alice Schiavoni Bosio of the Federazione Nazionale Pro-Suffragio Femminile (National Federation in favor of Women's Suffrage) in Rome opened the conference of 2,000 women and welcomed Benito Mussolini, who was in attendance. She was re-elected to the international board of the IWSA in 1924, serving with Germaine Malaterre-Sellier, Františka Plamínková, and Adela Schreiber, among others. After conflicts arose between Ancona and Ada Sacchi Simonetti, in 1928, who became president of the Federazione Nazionale pro Suffragio (National Federation in favor of Suffrage) which would become the Federazione Italiana per il Suffragio e i Diritti delle Donne (Italian Federation for Suffrage and Women's Rights), Ancona withdrew from active participation in the struggle for the vote.

== Later life and death ==
Through 1938, Ancona taught Latin and Greek in the upper grades at the Liceo Cesare Beccaria. Her family was affected by Italian racial laws, passed in that year by the Fascist regime and little else is known of her history. She died in Milan in 1966.
