= Anita Dobelli Zampetti =

Italian teacher, writer, activist

- Born: A. Anita Dobelli; 1865; Gardone, Kingdom of Italy
- Other names: A. Anita Dobelli-Noris, Anita Dobelli-Zampetti, Anita Zampetti-Dobelli, Annita Dobelli
- Occupations: Teacher, activist, writer

Anita Dobelli Zampetti (1865 – after 1931) was an Italian teacher, writer, women's rights activist, and pacifist. Born in Gardone, Lombardy, she grew up in Rome. She taught English and Italian at the women's normal school and became active in the Consiglio Nazionale delle Donne Italiane (CNDI, National Council of Italian Women), serving on its executive board. One of the founders of the Comitato Nazionale Pro-Suffragio Femminile (CNPF, National Committee for Women's Suffrage) she fought for women's suffrage. Although she was a secretary of the CNPF from 1908 to 1915, she left the organization because of its refusal to object to Italy's involvement in World War I. Joining the Women's International League for Peace and Freedom (WILPF) upon its founding in 1915, she served as correspondence secretary for the national branch from 1915 to 1921 and as chair of the organization's Rome branch.

Among the causes Dobelli championed were the socio-political empowerment of women to enable their independence. She fought for illegitimate children of soldiers to be recognized and protected and for the state to provide for women and children during the war. She protested against holding prisoners of war and advocated for their release. Her actions were viewed by the authorities as unpatriotic and she was regularly summoned for questioning by the police, surveilled, and her mail was searched. Her articles about social issues were published in women's and socialist journals. She also translated works of foreign authors who criticized social norms, such as Edmund Dene Morel and Upton Sinclair, into Italian.

== Early life and education ==
A. Anita Dobelli was born in 1865, in Gardone, Kingdom of Italy, to Ermelinda (née Noris) and Ferdinando Dobelli. Among her siblings were Adelina; Emma Bice, who later founded and became head of the Italian language department at Bedford College, London; and Spartaco, who later manufactured the Dobelli automobile. Her father was a radical journalist, active in the democratic movement after the family's relocation from Lombardy to Rome. She married Amilcare Zampetti, (Note: Bartoloni erroneously gives the spouse's name as Amilacare Dobelli.) a mathematician and physicist and they had two children, Furio and Novella Zampetti.

== Career ==
=== Teaching (1904–1931) ===
Dobelli (Note: Dobelli consistently used her own surname, although Italian law at the time required a wife to use her husband's last name. Before marriage she hyphenated both of her parents' surnames, Dobelli-Noris, and after marriage used Dobelli Zampetti, which some sources hyphenated as Dobelli-Zampetti. In 1975, Italy passed a law that required women to maintain their birth surname at marriage, barring them from use of the husband's surname. Simultaneously, the law prohibited parents from giving their children a last name that differed from the father, meaning hyphenated surnames were banned. A court ruling in 2022, finally overturned the ban against women's surnames being used, allowing parents to decide upon the surname of their children. Following her choice, Dobelli has been used throughout the article.) was an English and Italian instructor at the normal school of Rome. She strongly believed women had a right to economic independence and encouraged her students to prepare for a future without requiring support from men. On her quest to reform women's education in Italy, Dobelli recognized the lack of preparation girls had for secondary school resulting from primary focus on domestic science. She proposed educational reforms which would make their subjects be less intense, suggesting they should be divided into four sectors – science and mathematics, history and literature, pedagogy, and social sciences – each of which would have a path toward accessing university. She also advocated for co-educational courses. During the war, she served as a volunteer nurse. Between 1927 and 1931, she was affiliated with the Scuola tecnica occidentale (Western Technical School) in Genoa.

=== Activism (1903–1921) ===
Dobelli joined the Consiglio Nazionale delle Donne Italiane (CNDI, National Council of Italian Women), which was founded in 1903 and affiliated with the International Council of Women. Along with Teresa Labriola and Linda Malnati, among others, she served on the organization's executive board, which was chaired by Gabriella Rasponi Spalletti. She attended the 1908 Congresso Nazionale delle Donne Italiane (National Congress of Italian Women), speaking in favor of educational reforms. She was one of the founders of the CNDI's Comitato Nazionale Pro-Suffragio femminile (National Committee for Women's Suffrage) and served as its secretary from 1908 to 1915. In her view, without the franchise women had no voice in the laws or policies created to protect them and their communities. She urged women to fight for the vote as it was "the only direct means of influencing and controlling the actions of those who are called on to make the laws". She served on the executive committee of the Comitato Nazionale Pro-Suffragio femminile along with Teresa Labriola, Ida Magliocchetti, Maria Miani, and Clelia Pellicano, among others.

In 1915, when the Women at the Hague met and formed what would become the Women's International League for Peace and Freedom (WILPF), she joined the Italian section and left the Comitato Nazionale Pro-Suffragio femminile as it supported the war. Immediately after the Hague congress, the Italian WILPF organization was founded with an executive board in Rome. The board, consisting of Dobelli, Enrichetta Chiaraviglio-Giolitti, Rosa Genoni, and Elisa Agnini Lollini, was formed and two branches, one in Milan and one in Rome, were founded. Dobelli was chosen as correspondence secretary for the national branch because of her fluency in English. She also served as chair of the Rome branch of the WILPF. Although she attempted to arrange a conference with international leaders including Jane Addams and Anita Augspurg, among others, Dobelli had to cancel her plans and notified Rosika Schwimmer that Italy's entry into World War I made that impossible.

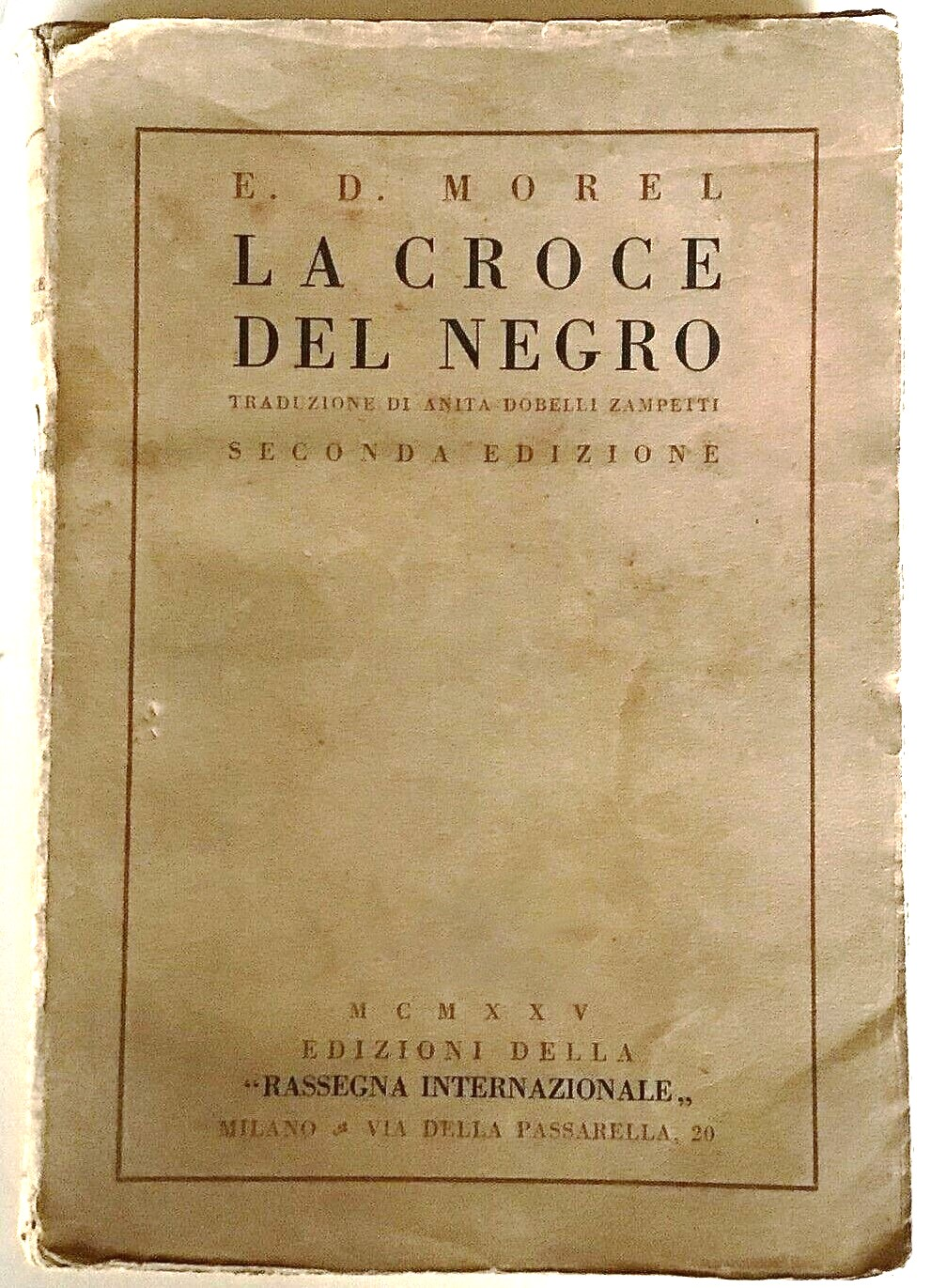
La Croce Del Negro, 1925 edition of Morel translation by Dobelli

In 1916, the national WILPF led a campaign for the release of prisoners of war because of the inhumane treatment they faced in enemy prisons. The action was seen as anti-patriotic and caused stricter surveillance of WILPF members and a search of Genoni's home. Between 1917 and 1918, WILPF led a campaign to recognize illegitimate children and provide state assistance to the families of servicemen. As a result, Dobelli's mail was searched and she was forced to report regularly to police headquarters, where she was questioned about her activities and associates. Genoni came under surveillance by the authorities because the Milan branch was deemed not to have filed the proper paperwork. As a result, the Milan branch and Genoni ceased to be active from 1919. That year, Dobelli was to be a delegate to the WILPF Congress held in Zürich, Switzerland, but all the Italian delegates were denied passports. In June the national WILPF marched with members of the Partito Socialista Italiano to protest the provisions of the Treaty of Versailles, which they felt were unjust. At issue were trade restrictions which limited adequate food supplies, armed intervention in Russia, and the return of prisoners of war.

The June march was followed by another joint action with socialists and WILPF members to press the legislature for women's suffrage. In August 1919 the parliament passed reforms in support of women's legal and political rights, but the ruling coalition was defeated in the 1919 Italian general election and the bills were not implemented. Intense social conflict including strikes, the rise of paramilitary gangs, and widespread violence made corresponding with the international WILPF organization increasingly difficult and by 1921, Dobelli was no longer in communication with the headquarters. All of the executive board members were watched by Directorate General for Public Security of the fascist regime because of their socialist and pacifist leanings, making it difficult for them to participate regularly in feminist networks. American press often dubbed Dobelli as "the Jane Addams of Italy".

== Writing ==
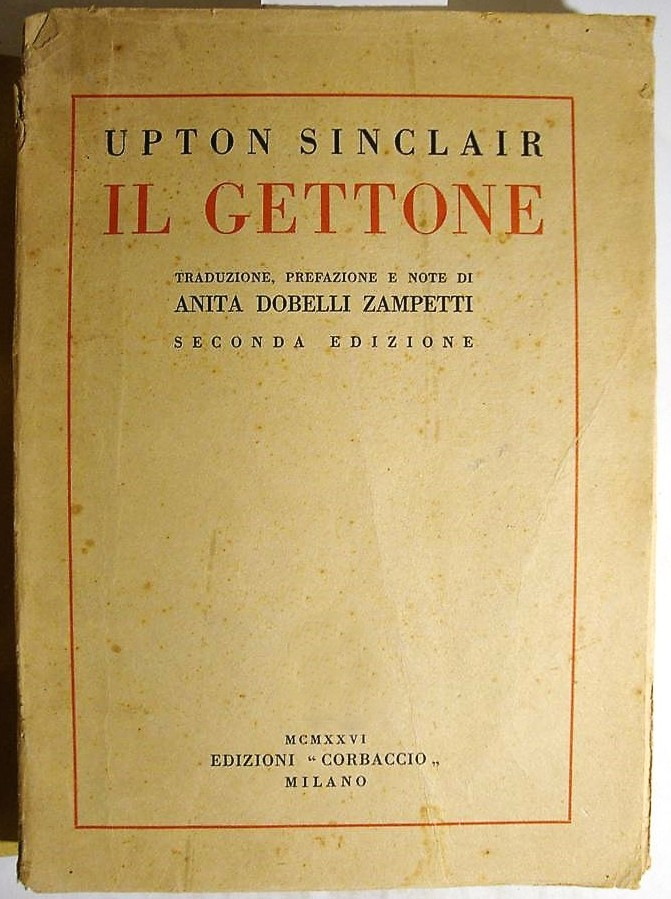
Il Gettone, 1926 translation of Sinclair by Dobelli

Dobelli submitted articles to the international feminist publication Jus Suffragii, until around 1916 and the Italian women's weekly Il Cimento (The Trial) between 1919 and 1920. She also published in socialist journals such as La difesa delle lavoratrici (The Defense of Women Workers) and Uguaglianza (Equality). Among her journal articles were: "Cacciano via le donne!" ("Cast Out the Women!", 1919), "Organizzazione e scioperi" ("Organization and Strikes", 1919), and "Lega internazionale femminile per la pace permanente" ("Women's International League for Permanent Peace", 1919). Dobelli reviewed works such as Théodore Joran's Autour du Féminisme (About Feminism, 1906), which she criticized as being "assolutamente privo d’ogni valore sociale" ("absolutely devoid of any social value") because of its lack of original thought and reliance on opinions of traditions which did not take into account modern conditions. She translated Upton Sinclair's expose on journalism in which he compared journalists to prostitutes who served the interests of politicians and business, rather than the public, and Edmund Dene Morel's works on the human rights abuses committed by the Belgian administration in their Congo colony. From 1924, she was a member of the Scrittrici Accademie (Italian Writers Academy) through the Società ligure di storia patria (Ligurian Historical Society of the Fatherland), in Genoa.

== See also ==
- List of peace activists

== Selected works ==
- Bell, Florence (1904). Commedie e monologhi da salotto per signore e signorine [Chamber Comedies: A Collection of Plays and Monologues for the Drawing Room] (in Italian). Translated by Dobelli-Noris, Anita. Rome, Italy: Libreria Manzoni di A. Fiocchi e E. Cristina.
- Dobelli-Noris, A. Anita (1904). Dieci mesi in America [Ten Months in America] (in Italian). Rome, Italy: Libreria Manzoni di A. Fiocchi e E. Cristina.
- Dobelli-Noris, Anita (1904). Giuseppe Giusti, i suoi tempi, l'opera sua [Giuseppe Giusti, His Times, His Work] (in Italian). Rome, Italy: Libreria Manzoni di A. Fiocchi e E. Cristina.
- Dobelli-Noris, Anita (February 1905). "A Women's Hotel at New York". Rivista per le Signorine. Milan, Italy: Sofia Bisi Albini.
- Dobelli, Anita (1907). "Th. Joran. – Autour du Féminisme. – Paris, Bibliothèque des Annales politiques et littéraires, 1906" [Th. Joran. – Around Feminism. – Paris, Library of Political and Literary Annales, 1906]. La Cultura (in Italian). XXVI. Rome, Italy: Ruggero Bonghi: 192–194. OCLC 671672707.*
- Zampetti, Anita Dobelli (1911). Conferenza letta nell'aula magna del Collegio Romano nel Maggio del 1910 [Conference Paper Read in the Aula Magna of the Collegio Romano in May 1910]. Sul problema della scuola media: conferenze tenute in Roma nel 1910 [On the Middle School Problem: Lectures Given in Rome in 1910] (in Italian). Assisi, Italy: Tipografia Metastasio. pp. 95–121. OCLC 37118533.
- Ransome, Arthur (1920). Sei settimane in Russia nel 1919 [Six Weeks in Russia in 1919] (in Italian). Translated by Zampetti, Anita Dobelli. Milan, Italy: Società Editrice Avanti!. OCLC 79111567.
- Sinclair, Upton (1922). Il gettone della prostituta [The Brass Check] (in Italian). Translated by Zampetti, Anita Dobelli. Rome, Italy: Rassegna Internazionale. OCLC 57558119.
- Morel, E. D. (1923). La croce del negro [The Black Man's Burden] (in Italian). Translated by Zampetti, Anita Dobelli. Rome, Italy: Rassegna Internazionale. OCLC 1068809514.
