= Eighth Conference of the International Woman Suffrage Alliance =

The Eighth Conference of the International Woman Suffrage Alliance occurred June 6–12, 1920, in Geneva, Switzerland.

== Conference ==
On call of its president, Carrie Chapman Catt, the International Woman Suffrage Alliance was summoned to its eighth congress June 6–12, 1920, in Geneva, Switzerland, seven instead of the usual two years after the last one. The reason for the long gap was the outbreak of World War I in 1914.

On Sunday morning, June 6, for the first time in the history of Geneva a woman spoke in the National Church, the Cathedral of St. Peter; A. Maude Royden of Great Britain preached in French and English to an audience that filled the cathedral. That morning at 9 Father Hall, sent by the Catholic ecclesiastical authorities from England for the purpose, delivered a sermon to the congress at a special mass in Notre Dame. In the afternoon, a reception was given by Emilie Gourd, president of the Swiss National Suffrage Association, in the Beau Sejour garden. At a public meeting in the evening at Plainpalais, M. J. Mussard, president of the Canton of Geneva; Chaponniere Chaix, president of the Swiss National Council of Women, and Mlle. Gourd gave addresses of welcome, to which responses were made by Annie Furuhjelm, Finland; Mme. De Witt Schlumberger, France, and Anna Lindemann, Germany, officers of the Alliance. Catt then delivered her president's address. She described the physical, mental and moral chaos resulting from the war, the immense problems now to be solved.

Catt showed how the suffrage had come in some countries where no effort had been made for it, while in others where women had worked the hardest they were still disfranchised, and she gave a scathing review of the situation in the United States, where it had been so long withheld. She paid eloquent tributes to Susan B. Anthony, a founder of the Alliance, and to Dr. Anna Howard Shaw, who had helped to found it and had attended every congress but had died the preceding year. She pointed out to the enfranchised delegates the great responsibility that had been placed in their hands and through it the vast power they would have in re-creating the world and said: "I believe had the vote been granted to women twenty-five years ago, their national influence would have so leavened world politics that there would have been no world war." Among the many objects for the Alliance to accomplish she named the following: (1) Stimulate the spread of democracy and through it avoid another world war; (2)Discourage revolution by demonstrating that change may be brought about through peaceful political methods; (3) Encourage education and enlightenment throughout the world; (4) Keep the faith in self-government alive when it fails to meet expectations. Methods for achieving these results were suggested and it was impressed on the younger women that this would be their task, as the older ones had practically finished their work.

A few of the delegates wished to disband the Alliance; a few others desired to change the character of its objects, but by an overwhelming majority it was voted to continue it along the original lines, although broadened, until the women of all countries were enfranchised. The Congress was held in the Maison Communale de Plainpalais, the large town hall in a suburb of Geneva, and here one evening its municipality gave a reception to the members. The shady gardens and sunny terrace were the scene of many social gatherings.1 The congress opened with a roll call of the suffrage victories and the responses showed the almost unbelievable record that twenty countries had enfranchised their women during the years of the war! The Official Report was edited by Miss Chrystal Macmillan, recording secretary of the International Alliance, and the Introduction was a graphic review, which said in part:

"Despite the difficulties of travel and the fact that only three months' notice had been given the gathering at Geneva was more widely representative than any previous meeting. Women were present from thirty-six countries. Of the twenty-six affiliated with the Alliance at the time of the last meeting, in 1913, the auxiliaries of nineteen showed their continued vitality by sending fully accredited delegates to Geneva. Representatives were also present from the former auxiliaries in Austria and Germany, who were accorded full membership rights. The Russian national president, a fugitive from her country, was unable to come but sent her greetings. The Belgian society abstained from taking part and from the Polish and Portuguese auxiliaries no answer was received.

Four countries, Greece, Spain, Argentina and Uruguay, sent delegates from newly formed National Suffrage Societies, which were accepted in the Alliance. In addition there were present women from Armenia, the Crimea, Latvia, Lithuania, Luxembourg, New Zealand, Poland, Turkey and Ukraine. For the first time women from India and Japan came to tell of the beginnings of the organized movement among the women of the East. It was only the difficulties of travel which prevented the delegates who had started on their journeys from China, Egypt and Palestine from arriving in time for the congress. For the first time more than half the voting delegates represented countries in which women had the full suffrage. The consequent increased political importance of the congress was recognized by the governments of the world, of which eighteen in Europe appointed official representatives, and the United States of America and Uruguay of South America. The Secretariat of the League of Nations also sent a representative.

The outstanding feature of the first business session was the announcement of particulars by representatives of the many nations which had given the political and suffrage eligibility to women between 1913 and 1920—Austria, British East Africa, Canada, Crimea, Czechoslovakia, Denmark, Estonia, Germany, Great Britain, Hungary, Iceland, Latvia, Lithuania, Luxembourg, the Netherlands, Poland, Rhodesia, Russia, Sweden, Ukraine and six more of the United States. It was announced that women sit as members of Parliament in the majority of these countries, while large numbers are members of municipal councils. In the United States of America the Federal Suffrage Amendment had passed both Houses of Congress and had been ratified by thirty-five of the necessary thirty-six States. Serbia, Belgium and Roumania had granted Municipal suffrage to women and the Zionists of Palestine and the Commune of Fiume had given to them full equal suffrage and eligibility. ... It was decided to arrange at the next congress a session at which only enfranchised women should speak. . . . The Catholic Woman Suffrage Society of Great Britain was accepted as a member of the Alliance.

On Monday, a special feature was the speeches of five women members of Parliament—Helen Ring Robinson (State Senate), Colorado; Elna Munch, Denmark; Annie Furuhjelm, Finland; Lady Astor, Great Britain; Tekla Kauffman, Wurtemberg. In all, nine women members of Parliament attended the Congress. The others, who spoke at later meetings, were Frau Burian and Adelheid Popp of Austria; Mme. Petkavetchaite of Lithuania and Adele Schrieber-Krieger, whose election to the German Reichstag was announced during the Congress. On Wednesday at the great meeting in the Hall of the Reformation, three-minute speeches were given by representatives of each of the enfranchised countries in the Alliance. Yet another new aspect was illustrated by the meeting of Thursday, addressed by women from India and China. The speeches showed how similar are the difficulaies of the women of both the East and the West and how much new ground has still to be broken before the object of the Alliance is achieved."

The forenoons were devoted to business meetings relating to the future work of the Alliance and they were in session simultaneously in different rooms in the great building—Women and Party Politics, Legal Status of Women, Civil Equality, Economic Value of Domestic Work of Wives and Mothers, Equal Pay for Equal Work, Single Moral Standard, Protection of Childhood— questions affecting the welfare of all society in all lands, pressing for solution and in all practically the same. The afternoons were given largely to the reports from many countries. The Woman's Leader, organ of the National Union of Societies for Equal Citizenship of Great Britain, in its account of the Congress said:

"The effect of these reports was intensely dramatic, mingled, as it inevitably was, with the memories of the strange and bitter conditions under which the change had come. In some of the countries that had been at war enfranchisement came in the midst of revolution, riot and disaster; in others it came fresh and new with the beginning of their independent national life and almost as a matter of course. "Our men and women struggled together for our national freedom," said delegate after delegate from the new States of Europe, "and so when any of us were enfranchised we both were." The report on the election of women to national or municipal bodies was deeply interesting and in many respects surprising. Germany easily surpassed other countries in this respect, having had 39 women members in the last National Assembly, 155 in the Parliaments of the Federated States and 4,000 on local and municipal bodies. In Denmark the record of success that followed the election of women was astonishing."

Catt, the president of the Alliance, welcomed each new representative in the name of all the countries, and, although the victories had been won in times of stress and war, the rejoicing showed no sign or mark of ill-feeling or enmity. Not that the delegates forgot or disregarded the recent existence of the war; no one who saw them would suppose that they were meeting in a blind or sentimental paradise of fools. Their differences and their nations' differences were plain in their minds and they neither forgot nor wished to forget the ruined areas, the starving children and the suffering peoples of the world. They met differing perhaps profoundly in their national sentiment, their memories and their judgments but determined to agree where agreement was to be found; to understand where understanding could be arrived at and to cooperate with the very best of their will and their intelligence in assuring the future stability of the world.

An important report was that of the Headquarters Committee, consisting of Catt, Mrs. Millicent Garrett Fawcett, first vice-president of the Alliance, Adela Stanton Coit, treasurer, and Miss Macmillan. Mrs. Coit was chairman the first two years and Mrs. Fawcett the rest of the time. After the Congress at Budapest in 1913 the official monthly paper Jus Suffragii was removed from Rotterdam to London and the international headquarters established there. For the next seven years the three members of the committee resident in London held regular meetings, seventy altogether, consulting Mrs. Catt by letter or cable when necessary. Miss Mary Sheepshanks was editor and headquarters secretary. "She occupied that post with great acceptance till 1919," said the report, "when it was with much regret that her resignation was accepted. Mrs. Elizabeth Abbott was appointed to the place, where in connection with the preparations for the present Congress her organizing capacity has been of special value." Rosika Schwimmer of Hungary was appointed press secretary to furnish the news to the international press but her work had hardly begun when the war broke out and she resigned the position to take up work for peace.

The report told of the meeting of the international officers and a number of the national presidents which took place in London in July, 1914, to make arrangements for the Congress in Berlin the next year. Among the many social receptions given were one in the House of Commons and one at the home of former Prime Minister Balfour. Mrs. Catt had just started on her homeward voyage when the war began. The officers in London at once issued a Manifesto in the name of the Alliance and presented it to the British Foreign Office and the Ambassadors and Ministers in London, which after pointing out the helplessness of women in this supreme hour said: "We women of twenty-six countries, having banded ourselves together in the International Woman Suffrage Alliance with the object of obtaining the political means of sharing with men the power which shapes the fate of nations, appeal to you to leave untried no method of conciliation or arbitration for arranging international differences which may help to avert deluging half the civilized world in blood." They decided to cooperate with the British branch of the Alliance in a public meeting, which was held August 3 with Mrs. Fawcett in the chair, and a resolution similar to the above was adopted. In the next issue of the International News, when war had been declared.

Fawcett and Catt were preparing to send a deputation from the Alliance to the Peace Conference to ask for a declaration for woman suffrage when the National Woman Suffrage Association of France, through its president, Mme. de Witt-Schlumberger, took the initiative and called for the national associations of the allied countries to send representatives to Paris to bring pressure on it. They were cordially received by the members of the Conference and a pronouncement in favor of the political equality of women and eligibility to the secretariat was placed in the constitution of the League of Nations, which attracted the attention of the world.

When the plan of holding the Congress of the Alliance at Berlin in 1915 had to be given up Holland sent an urgent invitation for that year but its acceptance was not considered feasible. The Swedish Auxiliary wanted it held at the time and place of the Peace Conference but this was found to be inadvisable. The majority of the officers and auxiliaries in the various countries wished to have a congress the next spring after the Armistice but there proved to be insurmountable obstacles. Toward the end of 1919 an invitation was accepted from the suffrage societies in Spain to come to Madrid in 1920. Preparations were under way when local opposition developed which made it necessary to abandon the plan. Switzerland had already invited the congress and it gladly went to Geneva.

In the report of Mrs. Coit, the treasurer, she said:

"You will remember that at Budapest in 1913 a sum of about 2,000 pounds was raised, mostly by promises of yearly donations for the period of two years. This sum was to finance headquarters and the paper till we met in Berlin in 1915. In August, 1914, not even all the first instalments had been received, and from then on, owing to war conditions, it became impossible for some of our biggest donors to redeem their pledges. By the beginning of 1917 we found ourselves with an empty exchequer and facing the possibility of closing down our work. It was then that help came from our auxiliary in the United States. Mrs. Catt, with the help of her many devoted friends, raised a sum of $4,333, which was placed at our disposal and has enabled the Alliance to keep going. When speaking of the United States' help I wish to make special mention of the splendid work for the Alliance by Miss Clara M. Hyde, private secretary for Mrs. Catt. To her incessant interest and energy it is due that the number of honorary associates in the U. S. A. now is at least three times as high as in any other country; also she has quite trebled the number of subscribers to the International News in the States. Her devoted work is an example of what can be done by a single national auxiliary to further the development of the Alliance, and I recommend her example for universal imitation."

The United States Auxiliary continued to add to the above sum and from May, 1916, to May, 1920, it sent in membership dues, subscriptions to the paper and donations $9,337. Mrs. Frank M. Roessing, president of the Pennsylvania Suffrage Association, was responsible for collecting over $5,000 of this amount. The money for the Congress in Geneva, about $3,500, was raised by a British committee of which Rosamond Smith was chairman and Emmeline Pethick-Lawrence, treasurer. To this fund the United States, which had not suffered from the war to the extent of European countries, was a large contributor. At the close of the congress, there were no funds on hand for the coming year and the delegates from all countries were feeling the effects of the war financially. At this critical moment, Katharine Dexter McCormick of the US, corresponding secretary of the Alliance, made a contribution of $5,000, and a little later, the Leslie Commission added $4,000. This, with individual subscriptions, raised the amount of about $15,000 and guaranteed the expenses for resuming and continuing the work of the Alliance.

From the organization of the Alliance in Berlin in 1904 Catt had been the president and at no election had there been another candidate. Her desire to relinquish the office was overruled at Budapest. She went to Geneva with the determination not to accept it again but she faced an equally determined body of delegates. Not only was she supported by all from the Allied Countries, as they were known during the war, but she was equally acceptable to those from the Central Countries. She was compelled to retain the office.

Nominations for the other officers were made by ballot and submitted to the convention and the 10 receiving the highest number of votes constituted the board. They were as follows: Mme. DeWitt Schlumberger (France), Chrystal Macmillan (Great Britain), Anna B. Wicksell (Sweden), Margery Corbett Ashby (Great Britain), Dr. Margherita Ancona (Italy), Anna Lindemann (Germany), Eleanor Rathbone (Great Britain), Katharine Dexter McCormick (US), Mme. Girardet-Vielle (Switzerland), Adele Schreiber-Krieger (Germany). Most of them were officers of the National Association in their own countries. Rathbone was also a member of the city council of Liverpool.

Among the 22 sent as Government delegates were Viscountess Astor, Marie Stritt, and Addie Worth Bagley Daniels. Invited members were present from nine countries, including ten from India, one from Japan and the wife of the Tartar president of the Parliament of Crimea. There were fraternal delegates from six international associations; from associations in nearly every country in Europe (fourteen in Great Britain) and from South Africa, Australia, Argentina and Uruguay. Greetings were sent from associations in many countries including China.

A number of the resolutions adopted were foreshadowed in the report of the proceedings. Others were for the equal status of women with men on legislative and administrative bodies; full personal and civil rights for married women, including the right to their earnings and property; equal guardianship of their children by mothers; that the children of widows without provisions shall have the right to maintenance by the State paid to the mothers; that children born out of wedlock shall have the same right to maintenance and education from the father as legitimate children, and the mother the right of maintenance while incapacitated. Resolutions called for the same opportunities for women as for men for all kinds of education and training and for entering professions, industries, civil service positions and performing administrative and judicial functions, and demanded that there shall be equal pay for equal work; that the right to work of women, married or unmarried, shall be recognized and that no special regulations shall be imposed contrary to the wishes of the women themselves. A higher moral standard for both men and women was called for and various resolutions were adopted against traffic in women, regulations of vice differentiating against women and State regulation of prostitution.

The Congress took a firm position on the League of Nations and its recognition of women in the following resolution: "The women of thirty-one nations assembled in congress at Geneva, convinced that in a strong Society of Nations based on the principles of right and justice lies the only hope of assuring the future peace of the world, call upon the women of the, whole world to direct their will, their intelligence and their influence towards the development and the consolidation of the Society of Nations on such a basis, and to assist it in every possible way in its work of securing peace and good will throughout the world."

A resolution was adopted that a conference of representative women be summoned annually by the League of Nations for the purpose of considering questions relating to the welfare and status of women; the conference to be held at the seat of the League, if possible, and the expenses paid by the League. The Board instructed Margery Corbett Ashby to arrange a deputation to the League of Nations to present resolutions and to ask for the calling of the conference as soon as possible. On the last day of the Congress, the State Council of the Canton and the Municipal Council of Geneva gave an official reception and tea to the delegates and visitors.

== See also ==
- International Alliance of Women

== Bibliography ==
- Stanton, Elizabeth Cady; Anthony, Susan B.; Gage, Matilda Joslyn; Harper, Ida Husted (1922). History of Woman Suffrage: 1900-1920 (Public domain ed.). Fowler & Wells.
