= Comitato pro suffragio femminile =

Italian women's organization

The Comitato pro suffragio femminile (Committee for Women's Suffrage) was an Italian organization founded in 1905 in support of women's voting rights. Among the most active participants were Anna Maria Mozzoni, Linda Malnati and Carlotta Clerici.

It was the first organization for women's suffrage in Italy, as well as one of the first national feminist organizations in Italy after the Lega promotrice degli interessi femminili.

Established in Rome, the Committee was affiliated to the International Women Suffrage Alliance. As such, it was independent of any political or religious preferences. Its principal objectives were to promote, defend and support the women's suffrage movement; to become the focus of action by regional committees; to set up committees in cities where they were absent; and to unite Italian women fighting for voting rights, exploring all legal avenues for obtaining the right for them to vote.

In 1906, on behalf of the committee, Mozzoni presented a petition to the Italian Parliament inviting the deputies to discuss granting voting rights to women. While sensitizing parliamentarians to the issue, it was also effective in forming a basis for discussion by women throughout the country. In order to avoid being associated with the British suffragists, whose methods acted as repulsive to Italian men, the Italian suffragists had a policy to act in a more discreet manner, since it was considered necessary to achieve the goal. The suffrage movement in Italy was quite small compared to its British equivalent.

In 1922, Benito Mussolini gave a promise to Comitato pro suffragio femminile to introduce women's suffrage. Municipal women's suffrage was legalized in 1925, but suffrage on both municipal and national level became powerless after the introduction of Fascist Dictatorship in 1926, and it was not until after the war in 1945 that national women's suffrage was finally enacted.
