= Paolina Schiff =

German- Italian teacher and activist for women's rights (1841–1926)

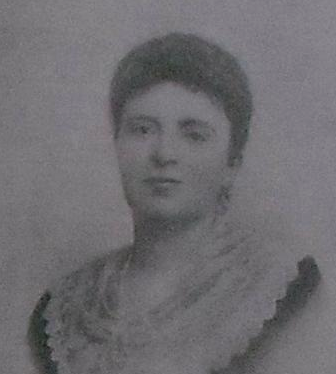
Paolina Schiff

Paolina Schiff (28 July 1841 – 6 August 1926) was a German- Italian teacher, suffragette, activist for women's rights. She is “one of the pioneers of the Italian women's movement.” She became one of the first five female professors in Italy.

== Biography ==
Born on 28 July 1841 in Mannheim, Baden-Württemberg, Germany, Paolina Schiff was the daughter of Samson Schiff, a silverware manufacturer, and Barbara Mayer. She received a liberal and secular education in Mannheim. In 1852 her family moved to Trieste, the northeastern Italy. Again in 1860 they moved to Milan where she settled and began her political and social activities.

In 1881, together with Anna Maria Mozzoni, a pioneer of the women's emancipation movement in Italy, and Cristina Lazzati, she founded the League for the Promotion of the Interests of Women in Milan, which was the first organized group in Italy to demand suffrage and equal rights for women. They also demanded reform of the civil code “which kept women under the control of men.”

In 1893 she started her professional career in teaching at the Accademia scientifico-letteraria, where she taught German language and literature. She later joined the university of Pavia to teach history of German literature.

In 1902 she joined the National Women's Union, founded by Ersilia Majno, an Italian emancipationist, in 1899 and started her activism for the rights of women workers. She supported the campaign on the right to seek paternity and against the trafficking of white women. she took the first initiative for setting up maternity insurances for the working women, particularly for the factory workers.

She was one of the leading pacifists in Italy. She organized a number of peace conferences particularly on the role of women in peace. In 1888 she founded the International Union for Peace and Arbitration in Milan. She was also associated with the Lombard Association for Peace and Arbitration, established by Ernesto Teodoro Moneta, a pacifist and Nobel Peace Prize Laureate.

She translated the literary works of a number of prominent scholars including Max Nordau. She was the author of a novel, The Refugee (1881). She briefly worked with Felice Cavallotti, an Italian politician, poet, and dramatic author. Filippo Turati and Anna Kuliscioff were some of her ideological companions.

She was 85 years old when she died on 6 August 1926 in seclusion in Milan, Italy.
