= Labriola =

Labriola is a surname of Italian origin. Notable people with the surname include:

- Antonio Labriola (1843–1904), Italian Marxist theoretician
- Teresa Labriola (1873–1941), Italian writer, jurist, and feminist
- Arturo Labriola (1873–1959), Italian syndicalist, politician, and journalist
- Jerry Labriola (born 1931), American mystery writer, physician, and politician
- Jochen Labriola (1942–1988), German-American painter
- Peter Labriola (born 1956), American author and cartoonist
- David Labriola (born 1960), American politician in the Connecticut House of Representatives
- Steven L. Labriola (born 1962), American politician
- Mark Labriola II, lead singer of the Christian rock band Foolish Things
- mick laBriola, (born 1951) American percussionist/drummer, educator, Residency Artist, Cultural Music Specialist, stained glass artist, songwriter, author and star gazer. micklabriola.com
- Paul Labriola, American gangster murdered in 1954.
