= Chiaraviglio =

Chiaraviglio is a surname of Italian origin. Notable people with the surname include:

- Enrichetta Chiaraviglio-Giolitti (1871–1959), Italian philanthropist and activist
- the siblings Germán Chiaraviglio (born 1987) and Valeria Chiaraviglio (born 1989), Argentine pole vaulters
