= Enrichetta Chiaraviglio-Giolitti =

Italian philanthropist and activist

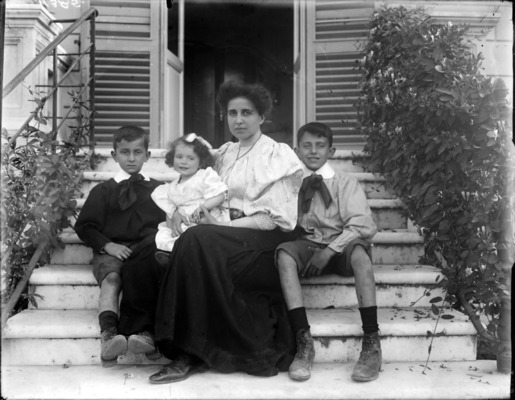
- (l-r) Tito, Marcella, Enrichetta, and Curio Chiaraviglio, 1909
- Born: Enrichetta Giolitti; 1871; Florence, Kingdom of Italy
- Died: 17 April 1959 (aged 87–88); Martínez, Buenos Aires, Argentina
- Other names: Enriqueta Chiaraviglio Giolitti, Enriqueta Giolitti de Chiaraviglio, Enrichetta Giolitti Chiaraviglio
- Occupations: Philanthropist, activist
- Spouse: Mario Chiaraviglio (m. 1894)
- Children: 4
- Father: Giovanni Giolitti
- Relatives: Lorenzo Sobrero (grandfather); Ascanio Sobrero (great-uncle)

Enrichetta Chiaraviglio-Giolitti (1871 – 17 April 1959) was an Italian philanthropist, educational patron and activist. Born in Florence, she was the oldest daughter of five-time Prime Minister of Italy, Giovanni Giolitti. An astute, intellectual woman, she was his confidant and correspondent, though they did not always agree on policy. Interested in improving children's education in Italy, she worked with several associations and on commissions to study and create curricula. She supported the Italian educator Maria Montessori and persuaded Margherita of Savoy, queen of Italy, to become a patron of her schools.

After serving as temporary superintendent of the Scuola professionale femminile "Margherita di Savoia" ("Margherita di Savoia" Vocational School for Girls) in 1910, she founded the Istituto di San Gregorio al Celio (Institute of San Gregorio al Celio). The institute taught mothers childcare and trained schoolteachers as in-home health visitors and inspectors. In 1912, concerned with the plight of street urchins, she put forward the idea of refitting a derelict ship as a floating school to Pasquale Leonardi Cattolica}, Minister of the Navy. The floating school Caracciolo was launched in 1913 under the direction of Giulia Civita, who had been proposed by Chiaraviglio-Giolitti. To fund the project, she organised the Unione Navi-Asilo (Union of Naval Asylum). The floating kindergarten operated until 1928, when it was closed by the fascist regime. She also worked on teacher-training reforms, attempted to establish secondary schools for girls, and pressed the government to offer agricultural education. Other initiatives included work with malarial children and on child protection laws.

As a women's rights activist, Chiaraviglio-Giolitti joined the Consiglio Nazionale delle Donne Italiane (National Council of Italian Women) and fought for women’s suffrage. In 1919, she was appointed to the national executive committee of the Women's International League for Peace and Freedom. In 1927, she and her family fled to Argentina to escape Benito Mussolini's regime. They started a metal-working business and joined anti-fascist organisations. She continued her activism for women, children, and education in Buenos Aires, where she died in 1959. Throughout her life, Chiaraviglio-Giolitti kept a diary and wrote prolifically. Her letters are valuable for understanding Italy's political currents during her lifetime.

== Early life and family ==
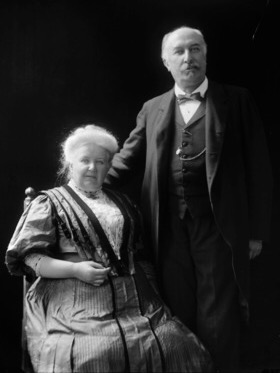
Rosa and Giovanni Giolitti in 1895

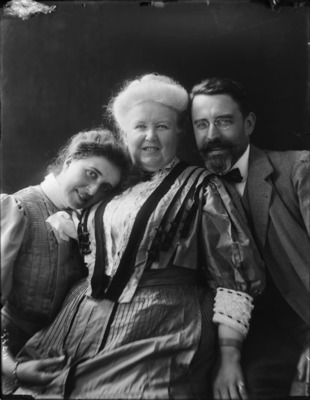
Chiaraviglio-Giolitti, with her mother and husband in 1895

Enrichetta Giolitti was born in 1871 in Florence, Italy, to Rosa (née Sobrero) and Giovanni Giolitti. Rosa was the daughter of Lorenzo Sobrero, the procurator general of the Court of Cassation in Turin and niece of the chemist Ascanio Sobrero. At the time of her birth, Giolitti's father was working as secretary to the minister of finance, Quintino Sella. Giovanni continued to advance in his political career, serving five times as Prime Minister of Italy. Giolitti was the couple's second child, but her older brother, Giovenale, died at birth. Her younger siblings were Lorenzo, Luisa, Federico, Maria and Giuseppe. (Note: Enrichetta's younger sister Maria (1882–1972) married Dino Chiaraviglio, the brother of her husband Mario.) The children were raised in a liberal environment and were encouraged to discuss personal and public affairs. He taught his children to be independent and to follow their own consciences, but emphasised loyalty to Italy and family.

Thanks to her acute understanding of politics and human nature, she was her father's favourite child and his confidante. Throughout their lives, the two often exchanged letters in which they presented their views on the political situation in Italy. Giolitti described her philosophy, explaining that she started "for the most part from the concept of what men should be, then from what a government should be, and when you see a government that does not respond to this ideal, you would like to bring it down". Her father, Giovanni, was more pragmatic than his daughter, recognising that neither governments nor men could be perfect but should strive to be better.

On 14 August 1894, in Cavour, Giolitti married Mario Chiaraviglio. Mario was an engineer who had graduated the previous year from the University of Rome. After their marriage, the couple moved to Berlin, where Mario was employed by Siemens. Giovanni joined them for some months in 1895, during a period when he was facing arrest and his government had collapsed. They then moved to Leipzig, where their eldest son Curio was born on 25 June 1897. Three children followed, Tito (born 1902), Sergio, and Marcella. By 1906, the family had returned to Rome, where Mario was a railway engineer. He worked for the national railway department on the construction of the Genoa and Riviera tramways and was elected as a radical politician in 1909, serving through 1919.

== Activism (1909–1929) ==
=== Educational reform ===
Chiaraviglio-Giolitti was particularly keen on education for disadvantaged children. She was an ardent supporter of the Italian educator Maria Montessori. To assist Montessori in opening the Casa dei Bambini (Children's House) in 1907, she and other socially engaged and well-connected women promoted the advantages of Montessori's methods. They persuaded Queen Margherita to become a patron of the school. A wave of anti-Montessori critics emerged after the 1911 conference held to discuss which method of instruction should apply to kindergartens in Italy. The three methods most-widely utilized at that time were designed by the Agazzi sisters, Italian pedagogs; Friedrich Fröbel, German inventor of the kindergarten system; and Montessori. Both the Agazzi sisters and Froebel advocated learning through guided play, meaning that to meet specific learning objectives, adults directed the activities in which children engaged. Montessori argued that children should learn through their normal daily activities, which would lead them to learn reading and writing out of curiosity. At issue was whether or not the nation should endorse early education that introduced reading and writing. in a 1912 interview with La Voce delle Maestre d'Asilo (The Voice of Kindergarten Teachers), Chiaraviglio-Giolitti supported Montessori. Luigi Credaro, the Minister of Education, announced that spring that Italian kindergartens would follow Froebelian methods.

In 1910, Chiaraviglio-Giolitti was appointed as the temporary superintendent of the Scuola professionale femminile «Margherita di Savoia» (Margherita di Savoia Vocational School for Girls), when the director resigned. She founded the Istituto di San Gregorio al Celio (Institute of San Gregorio al Celio) that same year, which provided educational opportunities for mothers and children, as well as a nurse's training curricula. The school opened in 1911 with the help of politician Teobaldo Calissano and others. As women at the time were usually not educated beyond secondary school, the curricula was designed to teach mothers how to care for their children and train school teachers to become in-home health visitors and assist school doctors as health inspectors. In 1912, she was elected vice president of the Associazione pro bambini malarici (Association for Malarial Children). The association was involved in national studies to improve the health of children through laboratory research, upgrading of facilities, and training for caregivers in the drive to limit infections of malaria and provide treatment.

Chiaraviglio-Giolitti worked on creating an asylum for orphans, and assisted in the creation of the floating school Caracciolo in Naples, replicating projects on the ships Garaventa in Genoa and Scilla in Venice. (Note: The school on the Garaventa aimed at reforming juvenile offenders, as an alternative to them serving prison sentences, and the Scilla trained fishermen's orphans to continue in the fishing industry.) The idea of the floating kindergarten was to take in homeless street urchins and provide them with the education and training they needed to become productive citizens. Chiaraviglio-Giolitti met with Pasquali Leonardi Cattolica, Minister of the Navy, and first proposed that an asylum ship should be created for this purpose. She also recommended that the school should be under the direction of Giulia Civita. The pyrocorvet Caracciolo was commissioned by the minister in 1912 and the school was inaugurated in April 1913. As a board member of the Unione italiana dell'educazione popolare (Italian Union of Popular Education) and representative of the Ministry of Education, Chiaraviglio-Giolitti was designated to serve as coordinator of patronage for the newly formed Unione Navi-Asilo (Union of Naval Asylum). Her duties included organizing local committees to promote and manage charitable donations for the Unione italiana dell'educazione popolare to benefit the school ships Caracciolo and Scilla and the Vittorio Emanuele II Orphanage in Porto d'Anzio, which served fishermen's orphaned children. Board members Chiaraviglio-Giolitti, Paolo Boselli, David Levi-Morenos, and Luigi Luzzatti met regularly with the Ministry of the Navy and the Ministry of Education to coordinate the programs. The Caracciolo school operated under Civita's direction until it was terminated by the fascist regime in 1928.

Among other projects, in 1913, Chiaraviglio-Giolitti served on the national commission to reform secondary and normal schools. The Daneo-Credaro Law of 1911 had set forth the need to study and reform teacher training, as there were insufficient and inadequately trained personnel to teach at elementary schools. On the commission chaired by Guido Fusinato were politicians, social activists, teachers, school inspectors, and representatives from the Ministry of Agriculture, Industry and Commerce. Although it was proposed that a women's secondary school be established for girls who did not want to pursue teaching, the commission could not agree on its need. They proposed co-educational normal courses which trained students both in the practical skills for teaching and in pedagogical theory. Chiaraviglio-Giolitti presented a separate report, which although it supported the teaching program in general, recommended making it less didactic and more oriented towards a broader group of students including women, as well as middle- and working-class pupils. Ultimately none of the suggestions were implemented because of a change in the political regime and the onset of World War I.

Faced with food shortages during the war, the women's section of the Società Agricoltori Italiani (Italian Farmer's Society) sent a delegation of women including Chiaraviglio-Giolitti, Margherita Armani, Agnese Celli, Ester Lombardo, Cornelia Polesso, and Emilia Santillana to meet with the Minister of Education in 1919. They pointed out that the approved curricula at that time barred agricultural training and argued that both normal and rural schools should provide such sources to prepare for meeting food requirements. Chiaraviglio-Giolitti expanded the idea to include garden cities, writing to Alfredo Frassati in 1921, of the benefits of raising children in the countryside. She was one of the founders and a board member of the Unione Italiana di Assistenza all'Infanzia (Italian Union of Child Care) in 1923. The organization was designed to act as a network to provide assistance to mothers and children, giving them referrals to available aid from agencies, assisting them with basic child care supplies, providing education on child welfare through visiting nurses or health workers, and establishing connections to government to enact child protection laws and integrate those policies in hospitals, schools, and child care facilities.

=== Women's rights ===
Chiaraviglio-Giolitti was a committed women's rights activist, and a member of the Consiglio Nazionale delle Donne Italiane (CNDI, National Council of Italian Women). In 1907, she began working on an initiative to assist women and children who emigrated. She was elected as a vice president of the CNDI's Segretariato femminile per le donne e i fanciulli emigranti (Women's Secretariat for Women and Children Emigrants), along with Maria Lisa Danieli-Camozzi (president), Carolina Amari (vice president), and Beatrice Berio (secretary). She participated in the 1908 first suffrage congress held in Rome, presenting a paper on emigration to Brazil. In 1914, Maria Pasolini-Ponte and Chiaraviglio-Giolitti, respectively president and vice president of the Società per la coltura della donna (Society for the Culture of Women), organized a series of lectures for women at the Roman College. The following year, Italian women formed two branches (Milan and Rome) of the International Committee of Women for Permanent Peace, which would become the Women's International League for Peace and Freedom (WILPF) in 1919. The national executive committee was made up of Chiaraviglio-Giolitti, Anita Dobelli Zampetti, Rosa Genoni, and Elisa Lollini-Agnini, each of whom immediately came under suspicion by authorities for subversive activities. From 1919, Chiaraviglio-Giolitti and Dobelli-Zampetti edited the WILPF column which appeared in the suffragist publication Il Cimento (The Trial). Women's suffrage had been granted to European women, except in France and Italy by the end of World War I and WILPF in Italy became one of the main organizations pressing for the vote. The rise of fascism in 1922 made Italian WILPF members and other anti-fascists targets of the regime. Their meetings and events had to be moved to various venues to avoid attacks from fascist gangs, making it difficult to keep the organization functional.

== Argentina (1929–1959) ==
After the murder of the anti-fascist politician Giacomo Matteotti, in June 1924, Italian civil liberties were curtailed still further. With the declining health of her father, whose power had protected the family from the political upheaval, Chiaraviglio-Giolitti fled with twenty family members to Buenos Aires in 1927. In 1929, her husband and sons formed Chiaraviglio Hermanos (Chiaraviglio Brothers), a company which initially imported Italian metal curtains and then began manufacturing them. In the 1930s, they transitioned to manufacturing valves for the sanitary infrastructure of Argentina and in the 1950s, changed the firm again, renaming it Moto Mecánica Argentina (Argentine Motor Mechanics). Chiaraviglio-Giolitti continued her work in social and educational activism in Argentina. She and her children, including Marcella, who had married Gioacchino Dolci, were involved in the organization Asociación Italia Libre de la República Argentina (Free Italy Association of the Argentine Republic) and opposed Benito Mussolini and his regime.

== Death and legacy ==
Chiaraviglio-Giolitti died on 17 April 1959, in Martínez, Buenos Aires. During her lifetime, she was a prolific letter writer and diarist. Going back to at least 1893, her archive offers insight into her father's thinking and into some of the political events during his tenure as Prime Minister of Italy. Many topics were covered, including the Banca Romana scandal (1893), the issues which erupted during the Rudinì Ministry over the unauthorized release of treaty negotiations between Britain and Italy (1896), the planned assassination attempted on Giolitti by the Salandra regime (1915), and the military crisis resulting from the Battle of Caporetto (1917). Her correspondence was also used extensively by Luciana Frassati in creating the three-volume biography of Frassati's father, Alfredo Frassati in the History and Historiography of Modern Italy, who was a friend of Giovanni and correspondent with Chiaraviglio-Giolitti. Some of her correspondence is in the collection of papers of Giulio Cesare Ferrari at the Archivio storico della psicologia italiana (ASPI, Historical Archive of Italian Psychology) at the University of Milan-Bicocca. The Istituto di San Gregorio al Celio (Institute of San Gregorio al Celio), which she had founded was run by Italian physician Angelo Signorell and his partner, the journalist Olga Signorelli in the 1920s and remained in operation through at least 1941.
