= Manuel Sacristán =

Spanish philosopher and writer

Manuel Sacristán Luzón (born Madrid, 1925, died Barcelona, 1985) was a Spanish philosopher and writer.

Sacristán, the son of a Francoist collaborator, moved to Barcelona in 1940, thereafter living most of his life in said city. He soon became a member of the Falange Española youth section and studied Law and Philosophy in the University of Barcelona, where he became a member of the cultural section of the Sindicato Español Universitario (the Falangist student union). After a thwarted contact with a clandestine Anarchist group, he and two fellow Falangists were shunned and persecuted by the mainstream SEU officials, resulting in the suicide of one of them and an ultimately ineffectual death warrant on Sacristán.

He subsequently moved to Münster, in Westphalia (German Federal Republic) in order to study Mathematical Logic and the Philosophy of Science (1954–1956). He became not only an excellent logician, but also a convinced reflective Marxist thinker and communist leader. Again in Barcelona, he taught in the Faculties of Philosophy and Economics of the University of Barcelona.

His academic career was fraught with difficulties. His political activity led him to the direction of the underground Unified Socialist Party of Catalonia (PSUC) and he had a leading role in the Catalan university movement. Due to his Marxist ideas, by which he was very influenced after his stay in Germany and which he introduced to Spain, he was expelled from the university in 1965. In 1966 he participated in the formation of the Barcelona Democratic Students' Union. It was not until after Franco's death with the restoration of democracy that he was again admitted. After having had to bear a bitter and humiliating period he was appointed professor of Methodology of Social Sciences at the University of Barcelona. During the academic year 1982-1983 he taught at the National Autonomous University of Mexico. It was in Mexico that he met María Ángeles Lizón, from whom he never parted until his death.

From 1947 he was the creator and driving force behind different periodical publications of a political-cultural nature. Along with Juan Carlos García-Borrón, he ran the magazine Qvadrante, he was editor of the Laye magazine and Quaderns de Cultura (an underground PSUC journal ). He directed and collaborated in Nous Horitzons, and in 1977 was a founder member of the magazine Materiales. In 1979, in collaboration with Giulia Adinolfi, he set up a new magazine, Mientras Tanto. This aimed to reconsider communist-emancipationist ideology through ecologist and feminist criticism and within the original Marxist matrix.

Throughout his life he was extremely active as editor and translator for different publishing houses. He translated more than 80 works by several authors: most notably Mario Bunge, Karl Marx, Friedrich Engels, Antonio Gramsci (who may be regarded as one of his main intellectual references), Theodor W. Adorno, Karl Korsch, Lukács, Galvano Della Volpe, Galbraith, E. Fisher, Labriola, Marcuse, Ágnes Heller, G. Markus, and E. P. Thompson. Of special interest among his work as an author are Introducción a la lógica y al análisis formal (Barcelona, Ariel, 1969) and numerous articles and short texts posthumously collected in several volumes of Panfletos y materiales (Barcelona, Icaria, 1983–1985).

In 1975 he began the project of publishing a critical edition in Spanish of the complete works of Marx and Engels in 68 volumes, under the imprint of Editorial Grijalbo. Only twelve of the volumes of this venture appeared, among them Sacristán's translations of Das Kapital, books 1 and 2, and the Anti-Dühring. Sacristán also edited and translated Antonio Gramsci's anthology of texts in the publishing house Siglo XXI. His editorial work was always underpinned by a long and sustained commitment to research and teaching in the philosophical, methodological and critical-cultural fields, and a commitment to intervention in the ideological debate of his time.

His first contacts with the Communist Party of Spain (PCE) took place during his first stay in Germany. He was a clandestine member of the governing bodies of the PSUC and PCE, developing over many years an intense political activity, both at the university and on the cultural front. Since the May 1968 crisis (the events of May in Paris and the Soviet invasion of Czechoslovakia), his differences with the official line of the PCC and PSUC led him to resign from nearly all his posts, though he stayed with the party until the end of the 1970s. It was not until 1979 that he declared publicly that he did not belong to any political party.

In 1978 he joined the Antinuclear Committee of Catalonia and was part of the eco-pacifist and anti-NATO movement. He was also a major influence in the formation of the Federación de Enseñanza, an educational branch of the Comisiones Obreras trade union.

Until his death, on 27 August 1985, at the age of 59, Manuel Sacristán carried out an intense intellectual and political struggle, becoming one of the most prominent Spanish political philosophers of the twentieth century.

== Bibliography ==
- The Marxism of Manuel Sacristán: From Communism to the New Social Movements. Translated and edited by Renzo Llorente, Leiden & Boston: Brill (2014)
