= Associazione per la donna =

Italian women's organization

The Associazione per la donna (Association for Women), also Associazione Nazionale per la donna, was an early Italian women's organization. Founded in Rome in 1896 by a group of women, including Elisa Agnini, Giacinta Martini Marescotti, Alina Albani, Virginia Nathan, Maria Montessori and Eva De Vincentiis, it was among the first to deal with women's civic and political rights.

The organization published several papers including an informative pamphlet titled L'oppressione legale della donna (Legal Oppression of Women) in which articles of law were examined and explained for the benefit of women. In particular, attention was given to laws regulating family relationships.

The association was dissolved following the riots of 1898 but was re-established in 1900. It played a major role in developing emancipation in Italy and functioned until the advent of fascism. During the First World War, under the leadership of Alice Schiavoni Bosio, the association operated a legal service for refugees. In October 1917, it organized the Convegno nazionale femminile (Women's National Convention) in Rome which brought together all Italy's women's organizations with a programme of wide legislative reform. At the convention, Margherita Ancona presented a paper on the state of suffrage in Italy.

By 1920, there were branches throughout Italy, helping women to use all legal means to enjoy the same rights as men.

Other women who were active in the organization included Valeria Benetti Brunelli, Teresa Labriola, Anna Maria Mozzoni, Irma Melany Scodnik and Adele Albani Tondi.
