= Lega promotrice degli interessi femminili =

Lega promotrice degli interessi femminili ('League for the Promotion of the Interests of Women') was an Italian organization for women's rights, founded in Milan in December 1880. It was the first organization for women's right in Italy. Short-lived, it nevertheless played a pioneering role in the history of the organized women's movement in Italy.

== History ==
Feminist activities as such was not new in Italy, but had previously only been performed by individual activists, and the League was the first organization in Italy. From the 1860s, a feminist press developed in Italy and feminist issues became a topic of public debate, but it did not yet have an organization to campaign for its causes. The League was founded in Milan in December 1880 by the feminist Anna Maria Mozzoni, contributor to the La Donne feminist magazine, and Paolina Schiff.

It was allied with the Unione delle Lavoranti (Female Worker's Union) for petty bourgeois and working-class women and included both upper class and working-class women in its Executive Committee. The League campaigned for legal code and working conditions and included such issues as equal pay and paternity searches, and campaigned unsuccessfully for the introduction of local suffrage in Milan.

The League became a pioneer role model, and was swiftly followed by new women's organizations formed in other Italian cities. National Women's Union 1897, the National Women's Association in 1899 and the National Council of Italian Women in 1910, and has been referred to as the predecessor of the prominent Unione Donne Italiane (Udi).
