= Antonio Labriola =

Italian Marxist theoretician and philosopher (1843–1904)

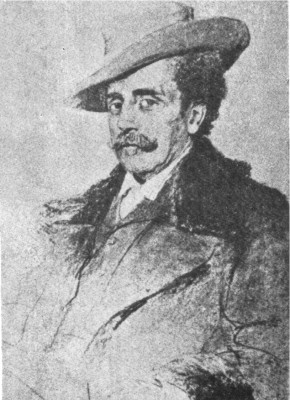
- Antonio Labriola
- Born: Antonio Maria Marziale Labriòla; 2 July 1843; Cassino, Papal States
- Died: 12 February 1904 (aged 60); Rome, Kingdom of Italy
- Spouse: Rosalia Carolina von Sprenger (m. 1867)
- Children: 3, including Teresa

Education
- Education: University of Naples Federico II (attended)
- Academic advisor: Bertrando Spaventa

Philosophical work
- Era: 19th-century philosophy
- Region: Western philosophy
- School: Marxism
- Institutions: Sapienza University of Rome
- Notable students: Benedetto Croce
- Main interests: Political philosophy
- Notable ideas: Marxist theory as a theory critical of ideology Marxism as a philosophy of praxis

Antonio Labriola (Italian: [anˈtɔːnjo labriˈɔːla]; 2 July 1843 – 12 February 1904) was an Italian Marxist theoretician and philosopher. Although an academic philosopher and never an active member of any Marxist political party, his thought exerted influence on many political theorists in Italy during the early 20th century, including the founder of the Italian Liberal Party, Benedetto Croce, as well as the leaders of the Italian Communist Party, Antonio Gramsci and Amadeo Bordiga. He also influenced the Russian revolutionary and Soviet politician Leon Trotsky.

== Biography ==
Labriola was born in Cassino (then in the Papal States), the son of a schoolteacher. In 1861, he entered the University of Naples,Upon graduating, he remained in Naples and became a schoolteacher. During this period, he pursued an interest in philosophy, history and ethnography. One of his teachers was Bertrando Spaventa, a prominent Italian Hegelian (whose brother was the politician and parliamentarian Silvio Spaventa). The early 1870s saw Labriola take up journalism, and his writings from this time expressed liberal and anticlerical views.

In 1874, Labriola was appointed as a professor in Rome, where he would spend the rest of his life teaching, writing, and debating. Although he had been critical of liberalism since 1873, his move towards Marxism was gradual, and he did not explicitly express a socialist viewpoint until 1889. Benedetto Croce met Labriola at the home of Silvio Spaventa in Rome, and later attended Labriola’s lectures at the University of Rome. Under Labriola's influence, He also wrote several works on historical materialism. Labriola died in Rome on 2 February 1904.

== Philosophical work ==
Heavily influenced by Georg Wilhelm Friedrich Hegel and Johann Friedrich Herbart, Labriola's approach to Marxist theory was more open-ended than that of theorists such as Karl Kautsky. He saw Marxism not as a final, self-sufficient schematisation of history, but rather as a collection of pointers to the understanding of human affairs.

These pointers needed to be somewhat imprecise if Marxism was to take into account the complicated social processes and variety of forces at work in history. Marxist theory was to be understood as a theory critical of ideology, in that it sees no truths as everlasting, and was ready to drop its own ideas if experience should so dictate. His description of Marxism as a "philosophy of praxis" would appear again in Gramsci's Prison Notebooks.
