= Giulia Civita Franceschi =

Italian educator

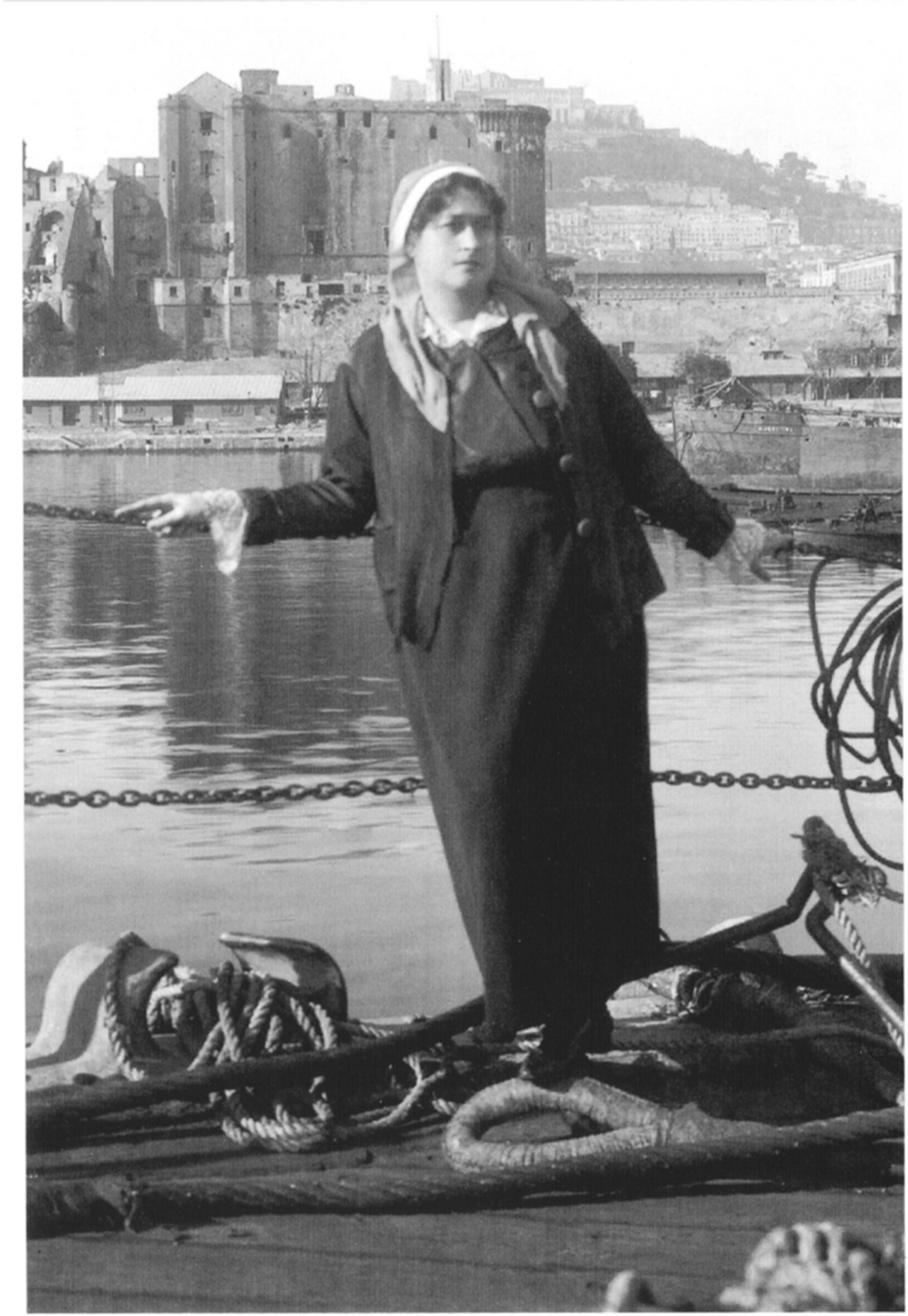
Giulia Civita Franceschi on kindergarten ship Caracciolo, in Naples port

Giulia Civita Franceschi (Naples, 1870 – 27 October 1957) was an Italian educator. From 1913 to 1928, she founded and educated street children of Naples on the kindergarten ship Caracciolo. 750 scugnizzi (underclass Neapolitan street children) were rescued and educated with her own method, becoming "citizens".

Her experience, before being shut down by fascism, in 1928, was studied worldwide, including a visit from a Japan state delegation in the twenties; she's also called "the Montessori of the sea". An exhibition was opened on her story at the Sea Museum of Naples in 2009.

The Caracciolo was a corvette built in 1869 and donated by the Italian navy in 1913.
