= Elisa Agnini Lollini =

Italian women's rights activist, suffragist and pacifist

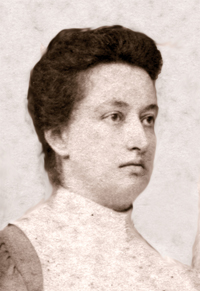
Elisa Agnini Lollini

Elisa Agnini Lollini (22 March 1858 – 22 June 1922) was a pioneering Italian feminist, pacifist, suffragist and politician. In 1896, she was a co-founder of the Associazione per la Donna (Women's Association) which not only supported women's civic and political rights but called for the withdrawal of Italian troops from the African continent. A member of the Comitato Pro Suffragio (Committee for Women's Suffrage), in 1910 she urged the socialist party to support votes for women. She also fought for improved women's rights, especially in the areas of education, divorce, equal pay, and working conditions.

== Biography ==
Born on 22 March 1858 in Finale Emilia to the north of Bologna, Elisa Agnini was the daughter of Tommaso Agnini and Elisabetta Kostner. In August 1885, she married the lawyer and politician Vittorio Lollini (1860–1924), with whom she had four children.

In 1896, together with four other young women (Giacinta Martini, Alina Albani, Virginia Nathan and Eva De Vincentiis), she founded the Associazione per la Donna which became an important exponent of the Italian feminist movement. She was also active in the Comitato Pro Suffragio, supporting votes for women from an apolitical viewpoint. A staunch pacifist, Agnini was firmly opposed to Italy's participation in the First World War.

Elisa Agnini Lollini died in Rome on 22 June 1922 from an esophageal tumor.
