= Paradise of Fools =

The Paradise of Fools is a literary and historical topic and theme found in many Christian works. A traditional train of thought held that it is the place where fools or idiots were sent after death: intellectually incompetent to be held responsible for their deeds, they cannot be punished for them in hell, atone for them in purgatory, or be rewarded for them in heaven. It is usually to be read allegorically, though what precisely is allegorized differs from author to author, and often its location is in the lunar sphere.

== Milton ==
One of the most notable examples of the Paradise of Fools is found in Book 3 of John Milton's Paradise Lost, where Milton, in the narrative of Satan's journey to Earth, reserves a space for future fools (Milton also calls it the "Limbo of Vanity"), specifically Catholic clergy and "fleeting wits". Milton's satirical allegory in turn was inspired by Ludovico Ariosto's Orlando Furioso (1516); Samuel Johnson, in Lives of the Most Eminent English Poets, stated that the allegory "disgraced" Milton's epic.

The ancestry of Milton's Paradise of Fools includes Canto XXXIV of Orlando and Dante Alighieri's Divine Comedy. As John Wooten argued, that canto in Orlando contains a summarizing critique of Dante's entire Comedy—a descent into Hell, followed by an ascent to a mountain top (Dante's Earthly Paradise) and a flight to the Moon: "with the greatest ironic debunking, the moon ... is Ariosto's allegorical substitute for the complex theology and metaphysics of Dante's Paradiso". In turn, Milton's Paradise of Fools builds on Ariosto's mock version of Dante's Comedy, but adds a specifically anti-Catholic aspect by making fun of hermits, friars, Dominicans, Franciscans—those equipped with "Reliques, Beads, / Indulgences, Dispenses, Pardons, Bulls". Central is the punishment of vanity; it is the place for "all things transitory and vain, when Sin / With vanity had fill'd the works of men: / Both all things vain, and all who in vain things / Built thir fond hopes of Glory or lasting fame" (III.446-49). Milton also "corrects" Ariosto; the Paradise of Fools is "Not in the neighboring Moon, as some have dream'd" (III.459)--a "mock correction", as Wooten calls it.

== Bibliography ==
- Brewer, E. C. (2001). The Wordsworth Dictionary of Phrase & Fable. Wordsworth Editions. p. 669. ISBN 9781840223101.
- Johnson, Samuel (1832). "Lives of the Most Eminent English Poets: Milton". In Murphy, Arthur (ed.). The Works of Samuel Johnson, LL. D.: With an Essay on His Life and Genius. G. Dearborn.
- Treip, Mindele A. (1994). Allegorical poetics and the epic: the Renaissance tradition to Paradise lost. UP of Kentucky. ISBN 9780813118314.
- Wooten, John (1982). "From Purgatory to the Paradise of Fools: Dante, Ariosto, and Milton". ELH. 49 (4): 741–50. doi:10.2307/2872895. JSTOR 2872895.
