= Alice Schiavoni Bosio =

Italian suffragette, editor (1871–1931)

- Born: Alice Bosio; 12 March 1871; Florence, Kingdom of Italy
- Died: 24 January 1931 (aged 59); Rome, Italy
- Other names: Alice Schiavoni
- Occupation: suffragette
- Years active: 1913-1931

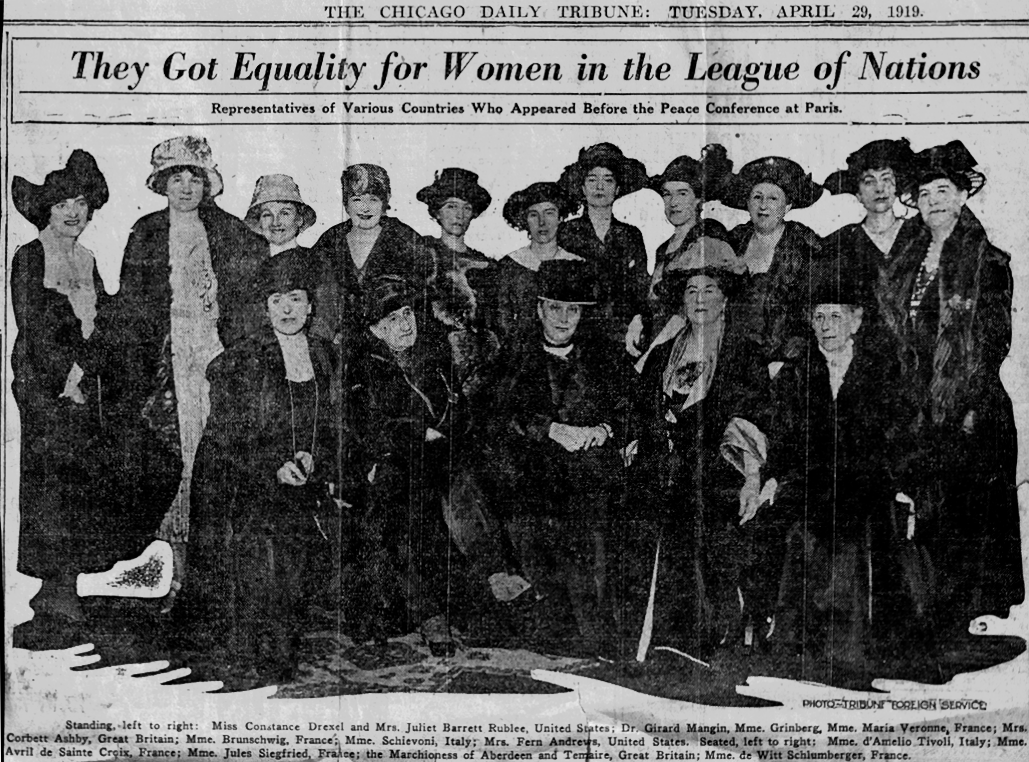
Alice Schiavoni, back row, at the Inter-Allied Women’s Conference in 1919

Alice Schiavoni Bosio (12 March 1871 – 24 January 1931) was an Italian suffragette. She served as the director of the journal Attività Femminile Sociale from its founding in 1913 through 1916. Affiliated with the Consiglio Nazionale delle Donne Italiane (National Council of Italian Women, CNDI), a member of the International Council of Women, Schiavoni was one of the participants in both the Women at the Hague Conference of 1915 and the Inter-Allied Women's Conference of 1919.

== Biography ==
Alice Bosio was born on 12 March 1871 in Florence. She married a doctor, Schiavoni, and moved to Rome, becoming involved in women's issues. Joining the Consiglio Nazionale delle Donne Italiane (National Council of Italian Women), Schiavoni was one of the upper-class women who worked for women's suffrage, along with Sofia Bisi-Albini, Maria Grassi Koenen, Jacinta Martini Marescotti, Maria Montessori, Virginia Nathan, Maria Pasolini Ponti, Lavinia Taverna, and Angelica Devito Tommasi.

In 1913, when the CNDI established a journal, Attività Femminile Sociale (Women's Social Activity) as its journal to disseminate information on the various groups working throughout Italy on women's issues, Schiavoni acted as its director for the first three years of operation. She not only managed Attività Femminile Sociale for the CNDI, but during World War I, served as manager of the Associazione per la donna, which operated a legal service for refugees. She maintained staunchly that the women's movement must remain apolitical to benefit all women. As one of the section leaders of the CNDI, Schiavoni was one of the Italian women who attended and spoke at the 1915 International Congress of Women at The Hague.

Schiavoni was one of the delegates to the Inter-Allied Women's Conference, which convened in Paris on 10 February 1919, as a parallel congress to the Paris Peace Conference. The conference marked the first time women had been allowed to officially participate in an international treaty organization, and Schiavoni was with the delegation who made the historic presentation to the League of Nations on 10 April. In 1921, she undertook a study with other women of prostitution. Their aim, as announced in an article written by Schiavoni in Giornale della Donna (The Woman's Journal) was to determine if regulating prostitution unjustly targeted women involved in the sex trade, without providing adequate health regulations or controls to vice, as legalization of the trade did not equally focus on clients.

Schiavoni remained active in the CNDI until her death on 24 January 1931 in Rome. She was buried in a joint tomb with Fannie Louise Bosio Bolens at the Protestant Cemetery.
