= Linda Malnati =

Italian women's rights activist, suffragist and pacifist

Linda Malnati (19 August 1855 – 22 October 1921) was an influential Italian women's rights activist, trade unionist, suffragist, pacifist and educator. She is remembered for her efforts to improve the working conditions of teachers from the 1890s, for her contributions to magazines calling for improved conditions for working women and, in the 1900s, for her support for votes for women. She was an active member of various women's organizations.

== Early life and education ==
Born on 19 August 1855 in Milan, Linda Malnati was the daughter of Giacomo and Carolina Pedrioli. Educated in the city's democratic environment, she acquired an interest in social justice and women's emancipation, strongly influenced by the feminists Laura Solera Mantegazza, Alessandrina Massini Ravizza and Anna Maria Mozzoni.

== Professional life ==
Her first article, published in the Republican journal Libertà e associazione was Alle donne e specialmente alle donne italiane (To Women and Specially to Italian Women). In 1875, she was employed by the Municipality of Milan as a schoolteacher for the lower grades, and in 1888 for the higher grades. She was dedicated to teaching, believing that education and emancipation were behind the regeneration of society, leading to democratic development. She was also committed to improving the living and working conditions of teachers, including equal pay for men and women, a topic she wrote about in a variety of journals and newspapers.

With a view to encouraging women workers to organize themselves, together with Anna Kuliscioff and Carlotta Clerici, in 1890 she established a women's section at Milan's Camera del lavoro, forming a kind of trade union. In 1893, she established a section for schoolteachers while revitalizing and chairing the Lega per la tutela degli interessi femminili (League for Protecting Women's Interests) which had been created by Mozzoni in 1881. In the late 1890s, she took part in the workers demonstrations, especially in the events of May 1898.

Writing in Vita femminile (Women's Life), she commented on the relationship between socialism and feminism, calling on women to combine the class struggle with the gender struggle. Among the women's organizations in which she was active, in 1903 she established a Comitato per il risveglio dell'attività femminile (Committee for Awakening Women's Activity) under Milan's Teachers' Association. This caused a number of male teachers to form their own Men's Society. She also promoted pre-school education and supported the Milan Popular University as a member of the steering committee.

In contrast to the dogma of the socialist party, Malnati considered women's suffrage the cornerstone of women's emancipation and development. After Roberto Mirabelli had raised the matter of universal suffrage in parliamentary discussions in 1904, together with Mozzoni she established the Comitato milanese Pro Suffragio (Milan Suffrage Committee) in 1906 as well as a national coordination committee. At the Milan Convention in April 1907 organized by the Catholics, she stressed the importance of votes for women. The following year, at the National Congress of Italian Women, she went as far as tabling a motion to ban religious education in primary schools, replacing it with comparative religion classes. After the motion was adopted, the Catholics broke off their collaboration with secular women's associations, creating their own women's organization.

In 1914, together with Clerci she proposed establishing a league for neutrality. During the First World War, she helped with civil assistance work and cared for refugees. From 1914 to 1920, she ran the Le Stelline orphanage with which she had long been associated. In 1917, she once again took up the cause of peace, promoting international involvement.

Suffering from a serious illness, Linda Malnati retired to Blevio on the eastern shore of Lake Como where she died on 22 October 1921.
