= Adele Schreiber-Krieger =

Austrian-German politician, writer and feminist

Adele Schreiber
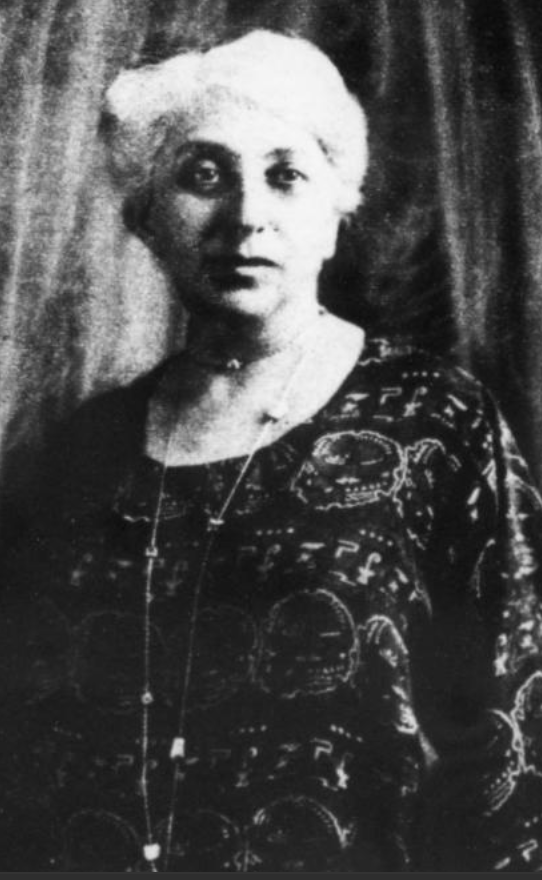
- Adele Schreiber, from a 1924 publication
- Born: 29 April 1872; Vienna
- Died: 18 February 1957 (aged 84); Herrliberg
- Occupations: Politician, writer, feminist

Adele Georgina Schreiber-Krieger (29 April 1872 – 18 February 1957) was an Austrian-German politician, writer and feminist. An activist for the rights of women and children, she sat in the Reichstag of the Weimar Republic for a total of eight years under the Social Democratic Party of Germany. She fled the nascent Nazi Germany in 1933 and settled in the United Kingdom and later Switzerland, where she died.

== Early life ==
Schreiber was born in Vienna in 1872 to Joseph Schreiber, a physician, and Clara Hermann, a writer. Although both parents were Jewish, she was raised as a Catholic. She attended boarding schools in Stuttgart and Paris, and began writing from a young age about social issues especially women's rights. She married Richard Krieger, a school doctor, in 1898. In 1900 she studied economics at the University of Berlin for a semester, and later travelled to England and France, where she made contacts within the women's movements of both countries and attended the London School of Economics.

== Career ==
Schreiber began writing articles about social and political issues for Austrian and international publications in the late 1890s. She wrote most often about the feminist movement, and argued for the rights of single mothers and for women's suffrage. She took up an editorial position at the magazine Die Staatsbürgerin (The Female Citizen) in 1910, and she wrote the script for the 1917 silent film Die im Schatten leben (Those Who Live in the Shadows) about illegitimate children.

In 1904 Schreiber co-founded the Weltbundes für Frauenstimmrecht und staatsbürgerliche Frauenarbeit (World Federation for Women's Suffrage and Civic Women's Work) and became the organisation's first vice-president, holding the position until 1933. From 1905 until 1909 she worked for the Bund für Mutterschutz und Sexualreform (Federation for the Protection of Mothers and Social Reform) and she served on the board of the Deutschen Gesellschaft für Mutter- und Kindesrecht (German Society for Mothers' and Children's Rights) from 1911 to 1918. From 1920 to 1924 she headed the "Mother and Child" department of the German Red Cross in Berlin. She toured in the United States in 1924. During her time at the Red Cross, she established recreation centres for children and represented the organisation at international conferences. Although she was involved in numerous causes for mothers' and children's rights, she never had any children herself.

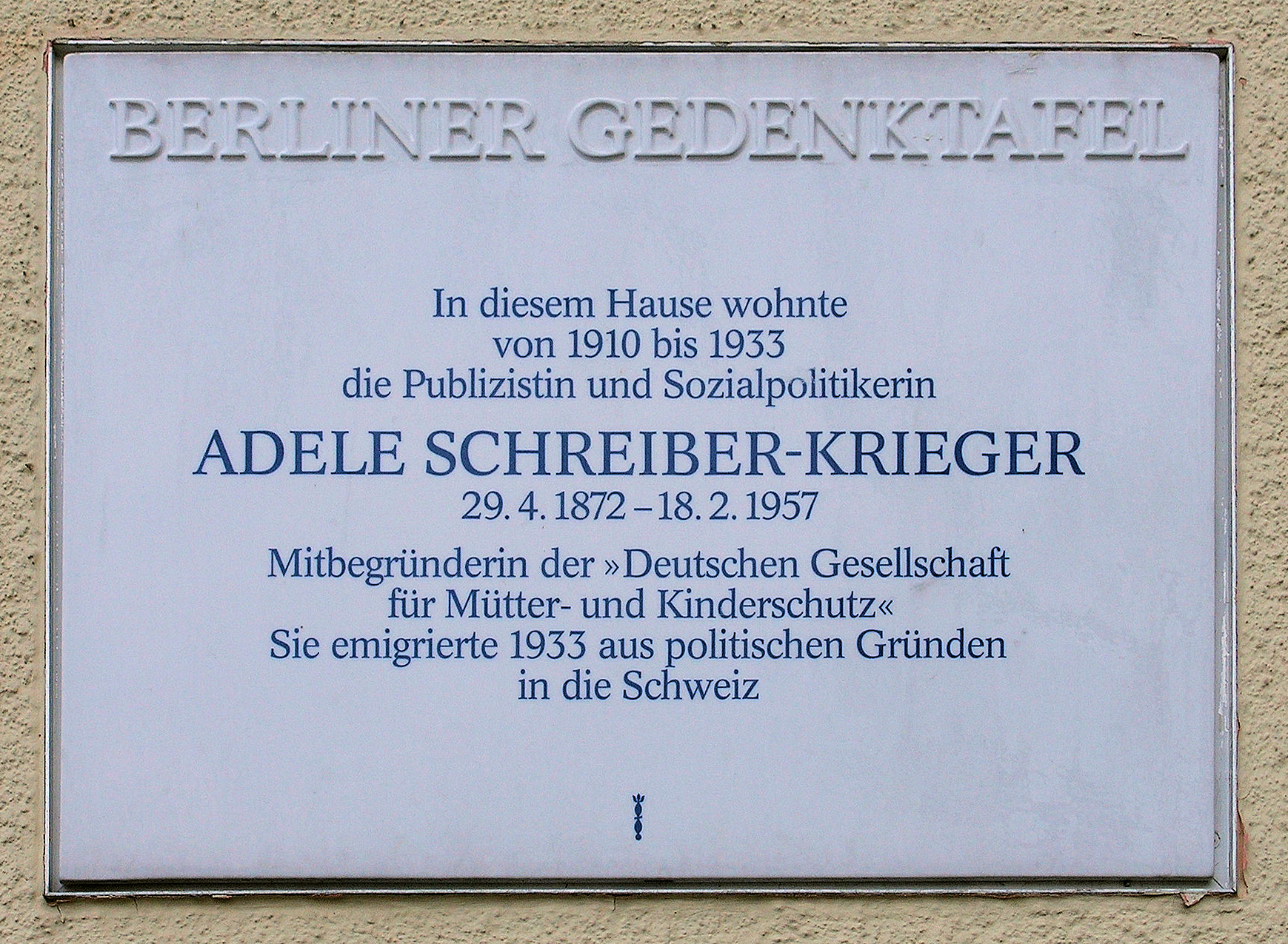
Memorial plaque for Adele Schreiber-Krieger in Westend, Berlin

Schreiber joined the Social Democratic Party of Germany in 1918, after the First World War had ended. She, along with 33 other women, was elected a member of the German Reichstag for the periods 1920–1924 and 1928–1932; in the intervening years she undertook an extensive lecture tour in the United States and France. In the Reichstag she advocated mainly for the rights of women and fought against Paragraph 218, an anti-abortion law.

== Exile and later life ==
On 5 March 1933, the day of the parliamentary elections that brought the Nazi Party into power, Schreiber fled Germany to Switzerland. She lived in Geneva as a political refugee until 1939, at which point she migrated to England; her German citizenship was withdrawn in the same year. She remained active in the women's rights movement, as well as a member of the British Labour Party, and was commissioned by the British government in 1944 to give lectures to German prisoners of war in English camps. She returned to Switzerland in 1947, and died in Herrliberg in 1957.
