= Teresa Labriola =

Italian writer, jurist and feminist (1873–1941)

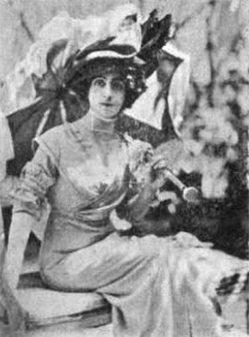
- Teresa Labirola in 1921
- Born: 17 February 1873; Naples, Kingdom of Italy
- Died: 6 February 1941 (aged 67); Rome, Kingdom of Italy
- Occupations: Writer, jurist, feminist
- Father: Antonio Labriola

Teresa Labriola (17 February 1873 – 6 February 1941) was an Italian writer, jurist, and feminist. The daughter of Antonio Labriola, a renowned Marxist thinker, Labriola served as the first Italian woman lawyer.

== Life ==
Labriola was born on 17 February 1873 in Naples.

From the time she was a student, Labriola was passionately involved in the nascent Italian feminist movement. Upon graduating, she held the position of Professor of Law at the University of Rome, making her the first female lawyer in Italy. Since 1906, Labriola was working with organizations who helped all women no matter of their economic or cultural status get the power to vote.

With the outbreak of World War I, Labriola embraced interventionist and nationalist positions, distancing herself from her family's Marxist convictions and becoming highly critical of socialism and communism.

During the fascist period in Italy before the Second World War, Labriola was one of the regime's most perseverant propagandists, stating that a woman's primary role was to be a mother and that education was secondary. She rationalised her support for fascism by calling a supposedly Italian reformulation of feminism "Latin feminism."

Labriola eventually became disillusioned with the fascist regime after women became increasingly excluded from public life in Italy. She died in poverty in Rome after a long illness.
