= Anna Maria Mozzoni =

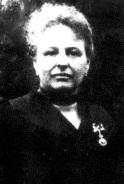
- Born: May 5, 1837; Milan, Kingdom of Lombardy–Venetia
- Died: 14 June 1920 (aged 83); Rome, Kingdom of Italy
- Occupations: Writer, Activist

Anna Maria Mozzoni (5 May 1837 – 14 June 1920) is commonly held as the founder of the woman's movement in Italy. One of the roles she is most known for is her pivotal involvement in gaining women's suffrage in Italy.

== Biography ==
Mozzoni was born in Milan in 1837. Early in her career, Mozzoni embraced the utopian socialism of Charles Fourier. She later defended the poor and championed women's equality, arguing that women needed to enter the workplace to develop the female personality outside of the "monarcato patriarcale" (patriarchal family).

In 1864, she wrote Woman and her social relationships on the occasion of the revision of the Italian Civil Code (La donna e i suoi rapporti sociali in occasione della revisione del codice italiano), a feminist critique of Italian family law. In 1877 Mozzoni presented a petition to parliament for woman suffrage. In 1878 Mozzoni represented Italy at the International Congress on Women's Rights in Paris.

In 1879, she published her translation from English into Italian of The Subjection of Women by John Stuart Mill. In 1881 Mozzoni joined with other republicans, radicals, and socialists in a call for universal suffrage, including woman suffrage. In 1881, she also founded the League for the Promotion of the Interests of Women (Lega promotrice degli interessi femminili) in Milan to promote a variety of causes of interest to women.

Mozzoni died in Rome on 14 June 1920.

== See also ==
- History of feminism
- List of suffragists and suffragettes
