= 21st Infantry Regiment "Cremona" =

Inactive Italian Army infantry unit

- 21° Reggimento Fanteria "Cremona"
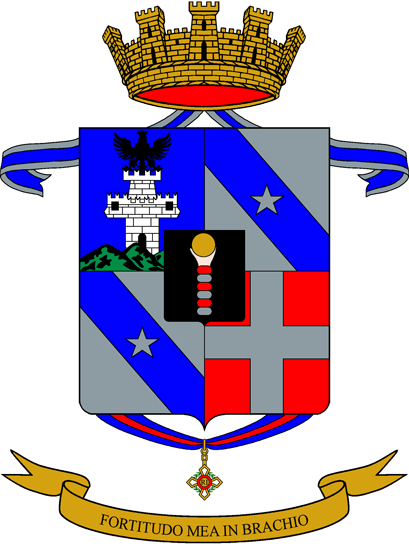
- Regimental coat of arms
- Active: 1 Oct. 1848 – May 1849; 1 Nov. 1859 – 10 Nov. 1917; 22 Nov. 1917 – 13 Oct. 2003
- Country: Italy
- Branch: Italian Army
- Part of: Cavalry Brigade "Pozzuolo del Friuli"
- Garrison/HQ: Alessandria
- Motto: "Fortitudo mea in brachio"
- Anniversaries: 1 November 1916 – Battle of Jamiano
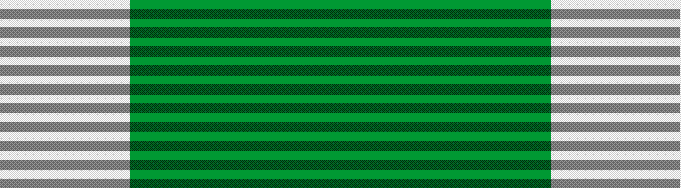
- Decorations: 1× Military Order of Italy; 2× Silver Medals of Military Valor; 1× Silver Medal of Merit; 1× Bronze Medal of Civil Merit

Insignia
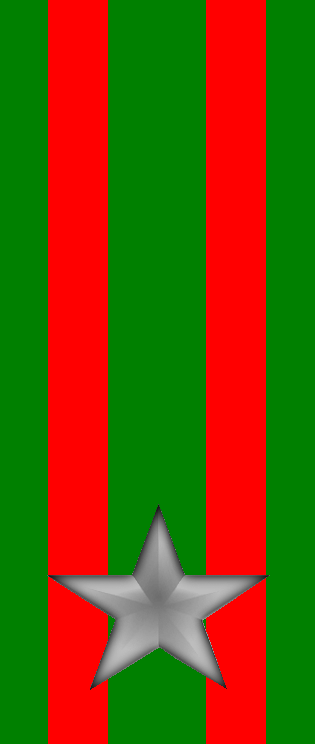
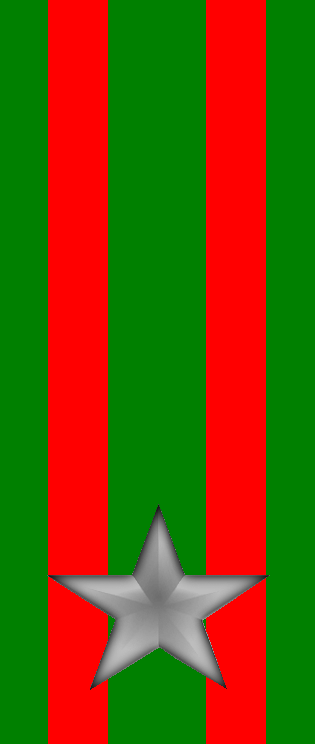
- Regimental gorget patches

The 21st Infantry Regiment "Cremona" (Italian: 21° Reggimento Fanteria "Cremona") is an inactive unit of the Italian Army last based in Alessandria in Piedmont. The regiment is named for the city of Cremona and part of the Italian Army's infantry arm. The regiment was formed in 1848 by the Royal Sardinian Army during the First Italian War of Independence. After the war the regiment was disbanded. In 1859, the regiment was reformed after the Kingdom of Sardinia annexed Lombardy after the Second Italian War of Independence. In 1866, the regiment fought in the Third Italian War of Independence. During World War I the regiment fought on the Italian front.

During World War II, the regiment was assigned to the 44th Infantry Division "Cremona", with which it fought in the Italian invasion of France. In November 1942, the division participated in the occupation of Corsica. After the announcement of the Armistice of Cassibile on 8 September 1943, the "Cremona" division fought German units retreating through Corsica. The division then joined the Italian Co-belligerent Army and fought in the Italian campaign on the allied side.

During the Cold War the regiment was assigned to the Infantry Division "Cremona". In 1975, the regiment was disbanded and its flag and traditions assigned to the 21st Motorized Infantry Battalion "Alfonsine". The battalion was assigned to the Motorized Brigade "Cremona". In 1991, the battalion was reorganized as a mechanized unit and one year later the battalion entered the reformed 21st Infantry Regiment "Cremona". In 1996, the regiment was transferred to the Armored Brigade "Centauro" and in 2002 to the Cavalry Brigade "Pozzuolo del Friuli". In 2003, the regiment was disbanded and its flag transferred to the Shrine of the Flags in the Vittoriano in Rome. The regiment's anniversary falls on 1 November 1916, the day during the Ninth Battle of the Isonzo the Brigade "Cremona" attacked Austro-Hungarian positions at Jamiano on the Karst plateau.

== History ==
=== First Italian War of Independence ===
On 12 January 1848, the people of Palermo in Sicily rebelled against the rule of Ferdinand II of the House of Bourbon, King of the Two Sicilies. The Sicilian revolution was the first of the revolutions of 1848. After the news of the February Revolution in Paris, which had led to the abdication of King Louis Philippe on 24 February, reached Turin, the King of Sardinia Charles Albert ordered on 1 March 1848 the mobilization of the Royal Sardinian Army. Initially the King's intention was to use the army against his own citizens, if they would rise against the Savoyard dynasty, but on 18 March 1848, the people of Milan, which was the capital of the Habsburg ruled Kingdom of Lombardy–Venetia, rose up and in five days of fighting drove the Austrian forces out of the city. On 23 March 1848, King Charles Albert declared war on the Austrian Empire in the hope that he could use the rebellions in Lombardy–Venetia to expand his own kingdom. Thus began the First Italian War of Independence.

On 25 and 26 March 1848, two Sardinian advance guards crossed the Ticino (river) Ticino river, which formed the border between the Kingdom of Sardinia and the Austrian Empire. On 29 March, the main body of the Royal Sardinian Army crossed the Ticino river and marched directly towards the Quadrilatero fortresses at Mantua, Peschiera del Garda, Verona, and Legnano, in whose vicinity the First Campaign of the war was fought. On 22–27 July 1848, Sardinia lost the Battle of Custoza and the Battle of Volta Mantovana. On the evening of 27 July, King Charles Albert ordered a retreat towards Milan. By 19h in the evening of 4 August 1848, the Sardinian troops had retreated within the walls of Milan, where one hour later King Charles Albert held a war council, which decided to abandon the city due to a lack of munitions and food. The next morning the Sardinians were informed that the Austrian commander Field Marshal Joseph Radetzky von Radetz had agreed to allow the Sardinians to retreat and by 6 August the Sardinians had left Milan and retreated over the Ticino. With the Sardinian troops also thousands of Milanese civilians and many of the Lombard volunteers, who had enrolled in the provisional Lombard battalions of the Provisional Government of Milan, crossed the Ticino. Three days later, on 9 August, the Austrian General Heinrich von Heß and the Sardinian General Carlo Canera di Salasco signed an armistice, which stated that Charles Albert's troops would withdraw from the whole of the Kingdom of Lombardy–Venetia, and the Duchy of Parma and Piacenza and Duchy of Modena and Reggio, whose rulers would be restored to their thrones. Thus ended the First Campaign of the war.

After the armistice the Austrians sent troops to occupy the duchies of Parma and Piacenza and Duchy of Modena and Reggio, while King Charles Albert began to expand his army with the intent to resume the war at the earliest opportunity. On 16 September 1848, the Royal Sardinian Army formed the 19th Infantry Regiment and 20th Infantry Regiment with the Lombard volunteers, who had retreated with the Royal Sardinian Army over the Ticino river after the signing of the armistice. The 19th Infantry Regiment was formed with the I, III, V, IX, X, XI provisional Lombard battalions, while the 20th Infantry Regiment was formed with the II, IV, VI provisional Lombard battalions, the 1st Brescian Jäger Regiment, the 2nd Lombard Legion, and the Cremonese Volunteer Battalion. The two regiments formed the 1st Brigade of the Lombard Division, which was commanded by General Girolamo Ramorino. On 1 October 1848, the 19th Infantry Regiment ceded two battalions to help form the 21st Infantry Regiment, which also received the XXII Provisional Lombard Battalion, while on the same date the 20th Infantry Regiment ceded three battalions to help form the 22nd Infantry Regiment. The two new regiments formed the 2nd Brigade of the Lombard Division.

On 1 March 1849, the Sardinian Chamber of Deputies voted for the resumption of the war, with 94 votes in favour and 24 against. King Charles Albert decided that hostilities would resume on 20 March and, as stipulated in the 1848 armistice, the Austrians were informed about the continuation of the war eight days before the hostilities resumed. Charles Albert massed his army near Novara, while the Lombard Division under General Ramorino was sent to guard the Ticino river crossings at Pavia. On 20 March, the Lombard division was at La Cava, from where it was possible to observe the Ticino river from Pavia to its confluence with the Po river. In the event the Lombard Division was attacked it was to retreat North through Sannazzaro towards Mortara. However, early on 20 March General Ramorino abandoned La Cava and moved his division South across the Po river, leaving only the 21st Infantry Regiment at La Cava with orders to retreat across the Po river if the regiment was attacked. At noon on the same day the whole Austrian Army crossed the Ticino river at Pavia and, even though the 21st Infantry Regiment led Major Luciano Manara resisted for six hours, the Austrians fixed the 21st Infantry Regiment in place with a screening forces, while the main body of the army marched North towards Mortara and Vigevano.

Ultimately the 21st Infantry Regiment was forced to retreat across the Po river, where it joined with the rest of the Lombard Division, which played no role in the remaining events of the war. On 22–23 March 1849, Field Marshal Radetzky decisively defeated the Sardinians in the Battle of Novara and on the evening of the same day King Charles Albert abdicated in favour of his son Victor Emmanuel. On 24 March, the new king met with Radetzky at Vignale and agreed to an armistice, which ended the short Second Campaign of the First Italian War of Independence. As a consequence of the Sardinian defeat the Lombard Division and its four regiments were disbanded in May 1849.

=== Second Italian War of Independence ===
In fall 1859, after the Second Italian War of Independence, the armies of the Second French Empire and the Kingdom of Sardinia occupied Lombard part of the Kingdom of Lombardy–Venetia, as well as the Duchy of Modena and Reggio, the Duchy of Parma and Piacenza, and the Papal Legations of the Romagne. On 1 November 1859, the Royal Sardinian Army formed eight new infantry regiments to garrison the occupied territories. Each existing infantry regiment, with the exception of the 1st Infantry Regiment and 2nd Infantry Regiment of the Brigade "Re", ceded its III Battalion and three depot companies with recruits, to help form the new infantry regiments. Consequently on 1 November 1859, the 5th Infantry Regiment and 6th Infantry Regiment of the Brigade "Aosta" ceded their III Battalion and three depot companies to form the 21st Infantry Regiment, while the 9th Infantry Regiment and 10th Infantry Regiment of the Brigade "Regina" ceded their III Battalion and three depot companies to form the 22nd Infantry Regiment. On the same day the Brigade "Cremona" was formed and the 21st and 22nd infantry regiments assigned to it. The brigade was then sent to garrison Brescia.

On 1 March 1860, the 21st Infantry Regiment ceded two companies to help form the 27th Infantry Regiment (Brigade "Pavia"), while the 22nd Infantry Regiment ceded two companies to help form the 28th Infantry Regiment (Brigade "Pavia"). On 5 May 1860, Giuseppe Garibaldi's Expedition of the Thousand set off, with the support of the Sardinian government, from Genoa and landed on 11 May in Marsala in Sicily. On 15 May 1860, Garibaldi won the Battle of Calatafimi and the Sardinian government decided to send reinforcements to Sicily. This triggered the Sardinian campaign in central and southern Italy. After the successful conclusion of Garibaldi's Expedition of the Thousand the Kingdom of Sardinia annexed the Kingdom of the Two Sicilies and most of the Papal Legations. On 17 March 1861, King Victor Emmanuel II proclaimed himself King of Italy.

On 16 April 1861, the 21st Infantry Regiment and 22nd Infantry Regiment ceded both one battalion to help form the 59th Infantry Regiment (Brigade "Calabria"). On 1 August 1862, the 21st Infantry Regiment and 22nd Infantry Regiment ceded both their 17th Company and 18th Company to help form the 71st Infantry Regiment (Brigade "Puglie"). On the same date the 22nd Infantry Regiment also ceded a company to help form the 7th Grenadiers Regiment (Grenadiers of Tuscany Brigade). From 1862 to 1866, the Brigade "Cremona" was deployed to the South of Italy to suppress the anti-Sardinian revolt, which had erupted in Southern Italy after the annexation of the Kingdom of the Two Sicilies. From 1862 to 1863 the 21st Infantry Regiment was based in Naples and then until 1866 in Potenza, while the 22nd Infantry Regiment was based from 1862 to 1864 in Potenza and then moved to Salerno.

=== Third Italian War of Independence ===
In 1866, the Brigade "Cremona" participated in the Third Italian War of Independence. On 25 October 1871, the brigade level was abolished, and the two regiments of the Brigade "Cremona" were renamed 21st Infantry Regiment "Cremona", respectively 22nd Infantry Regiment "Cremona". On 2 January 1881, the brigade level was reintroduced, and the two regiments were renamed again as 21st Infantry Regiment (Brigade "Cremona") and 22nd Infantry Regiment (Brigade "Cremona"). On 1 November 1884, the 21st Infantry Regiment ceded some of its companies to help form the 83rd Infantry Regiment (Brigade "Venezia"), while the 22nd Infantry Regiment ceded some of its companies to help form the 84th Infantry Regiment (Brigade "Venezia"). In 1887–88 the 21st Infantry Regiment's 1st Company deployed to Massawa for the Italo-Ethiopian War of 1887–1889, which led to the establishment of the Italian colony of Eritrea. In 1895–96, the regiment provided four officers and 146 enlisted for units deployed to Italian Eritrea for the First Italo-Ethiopian War. In December 1908, the regiment was deployed to the area of the Strait of Messina for the recovery efforts after the 1908 Messina earthquake. For its service the regiment was awarded a Silver Medal of Merit, which was affixed to the regiment's flag. In 1911–12, the regiment provided 32 officers and 1,151 enlisted for units deployed to Libya for the Italo-Turkish War.

=== World War I ===
At the outbreak of World War I, the Brigade "Cremona" formed, together with the Brigade "Friuli" and the 32nd Field Artillery Regiment, the 16th Division. At the time the 21st Infantry Regiment consisted of three battalions, each of which fielded four fusilier companies and one machine gun section. On 1 March 1915, the depot of the 21st Infantry Regiment in La Spezia formed the command of the Brigade "La Spezia" and the 125th Infantry Regiment for the new brigade, while the depot of the 22nd Infantry Regiment in Pisa formed the 126th Infantry Regiment for the new brigade. On 24 May 1915, the day after Italy's entry into the war, the Brigade "Cremona" was in Bassano in reserve. On 21 August 1915, the brigade was sent into the first line in Monfalcone at the base of the Karst plateau. On 21–22 October 1915, during the Third Battle of the Isonzo, the brigade attacked the heights above Monfalcone, but due to heavy enemy artillery fire the brigade failed to achieve its goals, and had to be taken out of the front as it had lost almost 2,600 men in two days. On 14 November 1915, the brigade returned to the first trench line for the Fourth Battle of the Isonzo. This time the brigade attacked towards San Martino del Carso on the Karst plateau and suffered more than 1,100 casualties for limited gains. On 12 December 1915, the depots of the 21st Infantry Regiment, 22nd Infantry Regiment, and 88th Infantry Regiment (Brigade "Friuli") began with the formation of the 210th Infantry Regiment, which on 24 March 1916 was assigned to the newly formed Brigade "Bisagno".

On 15 May 1916, Austro-Hungarian troops launched a surprise attack on the Italian trenches running from the Karst plateau to the Adriatic Sea and the next day the Regiment "Nizza Cavalleria" (1st) and the 22nd Infantry Regiment's IV Battalion counterattacked and drove the enemy troops back. On 18 May 1916, the depot of the 22nd Infantry Regiment in Pisa formed the I Battalion of the newly formed 226th Infantry Regiment, which was assigned to the newly formed Brigade "Arezzo". In June 1916, the depot of the 22nd Infantry Regiment in Pisa formed the 98th Infantry Regiment for the newly formed Brigade "Genova". In August 1916, during the Sixth Battle of the Isonzo, the brigade initially remained inactive at Vermegliano, but after Italian forces conquered the Austro-Hungarian summit positions on Monte San Michele on 10 August, the Austro-Hungarians had to fall back and the Brigade "Cremona" pursued them on the Karst plateau to the hills overlooking the Doberdò lake: the 21st Infantry Regiment towards Črni hrib hill and the 22nd Infantry Regiment towards Debeli hill. On 12 August 1916, the Brigade "Cremona" and Brigade "Chieti" pushed the Austro-Hungarians off both hills. On 14 September 1916, the first day of the Seventh Battle of the Isonzo, the 22nd Infantry Regiment, the Brigade "Lazio", and the Regiment "Genova Cavalleria" (4th) attacked Height 144 East of Debeli hill. After making slow progress, and spending the night under enemy artillery fire, the next day, 15 September, the attacking units were reinforced by the III Cyclists Battalion and V Cyclists Battalion and again made only limited advances. On 16 September, the attacking units were reinforced by the 21st Infantry Regiment and the VIII Cyclists Battalion, and XI Cyclists Battalion, and by late afternoon the III and XI Cyclist battalions took the summit of Height 144. The Brigade "Cremona" suffered some 1,200 casualties in these three days. On 31 October 1916, the Ninth Battle of the Isonzo began and on 1 November the Brigade "Cremaon" attacked from Doberdò lake towards Jamiano.

On 25 January 1917, the depot of the 21st Infantry Regiment in La Spezia formed the 233rd Infantry Regiment for the newly formed Brigade "Lario", while the depot of the 22nd Infantry Regiment in Pisa formed the command of the Brigade "Grosseto" and the 237th Infantry Regiment for the newly formed brigade. On 9 March 1917, the Brigade "Cremona" was transferred to the Asiago plateau, where it entered the frontline at Cesuna. The brigade returned to the Isonzo front for the Eleventh Battle of the Isonzo, during which the brigade fought on the Banjšice plateau. On 24 October 1917, Austro-Hungarian forces, reinforced by German units, commenced the Battle of Caporetto. The German forces were able to break into the Italian front line at Caporetto and rout the Italian forces opposing them, which forced the Italian armies along the Isonzo river and in the Julian Alps to retreat behind the Piave river. The Brigade "Cremona", which at the time was in the first line at Podlaka, began the retreat to the Piave river on 25 October. The 21st Infantry Regiment, which formed the Italian rearguard, blocked the pursuing enemy from crossing the Isonzo at Ložice. On 27 October, the 21st Infantry Regiment joined up with the rest of the brigade, which retreated towards Cormons. After arriving in Carpeneto, the brigade was ordered to march to Campoformido and establish a blocking line North of it between Colloredo di Prato and Faugnacco. However, the brigade found Campoformido already occupied by the enemy and therefore continued its retreat. On 1 November 1917, the remnants established a loose defense line on the Western bank of the Tagliamento river Southeast of Valvasone. On 5 November, the brigade continued the retreat and on 9 November the survivors cross the Piave river at Ponte della Priula.

On 10 November 1917, the Brigade "Cremona", which had suffered more than 2,300 casualties during the retreat, was disbanded. The brigade's survivors were assigned to the 257th Infantry Regiment and 258th Infantry Regiment of the Brigade "Tortona". On 22 November 1917, the Brigade "Tortona" was renamed Brigade "Cremona", with the brigade's regiments renumbered as 21st Infantry Regiment respectively 22nd Infantry Regiment. On 25 November 1917, the Brigade "Cremona" was again in the first line, with the 21st Infantry Regiment on Monte Tomba in the Monte Grappa massif, and the 22nd Infantry Regiment in the nearby village of Possagno in reserve. On 29 November 1917, also the Brigade "La Spezia", which had been formed in March 1915 by the depots of the 21st and 22nd infantry regiments, was disbanded due to the heavy losses the brigade had suffered in the retreat to the Piave river.

On 14 January 1914, the 22nd Infantry Regiment attacked and took the summit of Monte Asolone on the Monte Grappa massif, but the regiment had to fall back to the Italian lines on 16 January after having suffered more than 900 casualties in the attacks and counterattacks of the preceding three days. On 15 June 1918, the first day of the Second Battle of the Piave River the brigade held the line on Monte Pertica, where in a day of heavy fighting the brigade lost more than 900 men, before falling back to Monte Oro. The next day the brigade defeated a second attack by the Austro-Hungarians, after which the enemy did not attack the Brigade "Cremona" again. On 15 October 1918, the Brigade "La Spezia" was reformed with Italian units fighting on the Macedonian front, with the depots of the Brigade "Cremona" responsible to mobilize replacements for the reformed brigade. On 24 October 1918, the first day of the decisive Battle of Vittorio Veneto, the brigade attacked the Austro-Hungarian lines on Monte Prassolan and Monte Pertica. The next day, the 21st Infantry Regiment's II Battalion managed to take the summit of Monte Pertica, and on 27 October the battalion, together with the II Battalion of the 239th Infantry Regiment (Brigade "Pesaro") defeated an enemy counterattack. By evening of 27 October the Brigade "Cremona" had lost more than 1,500 men and was sent to man the trenches of the second Italian line, where the brigade remained until the Armistice of Villa Giusti came into effect.

For its conduct on the Karst plateau in August, September and November 1916, and for the bravery of its II Battalion on Monte Pertica on 25–27 October 1918, the 21st Infantry Regiment was awarded a Silver Medal of Military Valor, while the 22nd Infantry Regiment was awarded a Silver Medal of Military Valor for its conduct on the Karst plateau in August, September and November 1916, and for its bravery on Monte Asolone on 14 January 1918. The medals were affixed to the flags of the two regiments and added to their coat of arms.

=== Interwar years ===
On 15 November 1926, the Brigade "Friuli" and the 87th Infantry Regiment "Friuli" were disbanded, while the 88th Infantry Regiment "Friuli" was transferred to the Brigade "Cremona". On 28 December 1926, the Brigade "Cremona" was renamed XX Infantry Brigade. The brigade was the infantry component of the 20th Territorial Division of Livorno, which also included the 7th Field Artillery Regiment. At the same time the brigade's original two infantry regiments were renamed 21st Infantry Regiment "Cremona" and 22nd Infantry Regiment "Cremona".

In 1934, the 20th Territorial Division of Livorno changed its name to 20th Infantry Division "Curtatone e Montanara". A name change that also extended to the division's infantry brigade. In 1935–36, the 21st Infantry Regiment "Cremona" provided two officers and 22 troops to units deployed to East Africa for the Second Italo-Ethiopian War. On 9 March 1937, the 87th Infantry Regiment "Friuli" was reformed in Arezzo and assigned to the XIX Infantry Brigade "Gavinana", which was the infantry component of the 19th Infantry Division "Gavinana". On 15 April 1939, the XIX Infantry Brigade "Gavinana" was disbanded and the brigade's regiments came under direct command of the 19th Infantry Division "Gavinana", which on the same date was renamed 19th Infantry Division "Venezia". On 24 August 1939, the XX Infantry Brigade "Curtatone e Montanara" was disbanded and the 21st Infantry Regiment "Cremona" and 22nd Infantry Regiment "Cremona" were transferred to the newly formed 44th Infantry Division "Cremona". On the same date the 87th Infantry Regiment "Friuli" was transferred from the 19th Infantry Division "Venezia" to the 20th Infantry Division "Curtatone e Montanara", which on the same date was renamed 20th Infantry Division "Friuli". Also on the same date the 7th Artillery Regiment "Curtatone e Montanara" was transferred from the 20th Infantry Division "Friuli" to the 44th Infantry Division "Cremona" and renamed 7th Artillery Regiment "Cremona".

=== World War II ===
At the outbreak of World War II, the 21st Infantry Regiment "Cremona" consisted of a command, a command company, three fusilier battalions, and a support weapons battery equipped with 65/17 infantry support guns. The regimental mortar company, which was equipped with 81mm Mod. 35 mortars was formed in September 1940. On 10 June 1940, Italy entered World War II by invading France and the "Cremona" division was deployed near Ventimiglia in the invasion force's second echelon behind the 5th Infantry Division "Cosseria". On 24 June 1940, the Franco-Italian Armistice was signed and the "Cremona" division returned to its garrisons.

In February 1941, the "Cremona" division was ordered to transfer to northern Sardinia on coastal defense duty. On 15 November 1941, the depot of the 22nd Infantry Regiment in Pisa reformed the 126th Infantry Regiment "La Spezia" for the 80th Infantry Division "La Spezia", while on 15 February 1942 the depot of the 7th Artillery Regiment "Cremona" in Pisa formed the 80th Artillery Regiment "La Spezia" for the new division. On 10 December 1940, the "Cremona" division received the 90th CC.NN. Legion "Pisa" of the fascist militia as reinforcement. On 8 November 1942, Allied forces landed in French North Africa and Germany and Italy reacted by occupying Vichy France. On 11 November 1942, the "Cremona" division was ferried from Sardinia to Southern Corsica, while its sister division, the 20th Infantry Division "Friuli", was ferried from Livorno to Northern Corsica.

On 8 September 1943, the Armistice of Cassibile between Italy and the Allies was announced and the "Cremona" and "Friuli" divisions, together with French partisans, fought the German Sturmbrigade Reichführer-SS, which was located in Southern Corsica, and the 90th Panzergrenadier Division, which had crossed over from Sardinia. The two German units moved along Corsica's Eastern coast towards the harbor of Bastia in the island's North, with the two Italian divisions attempting to block their escape. On 13 September 1943, elements of the Free French 4th Moroccan Mountain Division landed in Ajaccio to support the Italian efforts to block the German's escape, but in the night of 3–4 October 1943 the last German units were embarked in Bastia leaving behind 700 dead and 350 POWs.

After the end of operations on Corsica all Italian units were transferred to Sardinia, where they joined the Italian Co-belligerent Army. On 15 November 1943, the 90th CC.NN. Legion was renamed 321st Infantry Regiment "Cremona". On 10 May 1944, the two battalions of the 321st Infantry Regiment "Cremona" were disbanded and their fascists personnel discharged. On the same day the 21st Infantry Regiment "Cremona" and 22nd Infantry Regiment "Cremona" ceded both their III Battalion to the 321st Infantry Regiment "Cremona". In July 1944, the "Cremona" division was transferred to Southern Italy, where on 15 September 1944, the 321st Infantry Regiment "Cremona" was disbanded and its two battalions returned to their original regiments. On 25 September 1944, the 44th Infantry Division "Cremona" was reorganized in Altavilla Irpina as Combat Group "Cremona". The combat group consisted of the 21st Infantry Regiment "Cremona", 22nd Infantry Regiment "Cremona", 7th Artillery Regiment "Cremona", and CXLIV Engineer Battalion. The combat group was equipped with British weapons and materiel and assigned to the British V Corps, with which it participated in the Italian campaign.

On 12 January 1945, the Combat Group "Cremona" entered the frontline between the railroad from Alfonsine to Ravenna and the Adriatic Sea. On 2–3 March 1945, the 22nd Infantry Regiment "Cremona" eliminated a dangerous German salient at Torre Primaro on the lower Reno river. On 6 April 1945, the allied 1945 spring offensive began and the combat group crossed the Senio river and liberated Alfonsine. Next the combat group crossed the Santerno river and advanced North, liberating Adria, Chioggia, Mestre, and Venice.

For their conduct in Corsica between 9 September and 3 October 1943, and for their conduct between 12 January and 8 May 1945, the 21st Infantry Regiment "Cremona" and 22nd Infantry Regiment "Cremona" were both awarded a Silver Medal of Military Valor, while the 7th Artillery Regiment "Cremona" was awarded a Bronze Medal of Military Valor. The medals were affixed to the regiments' flags and added to their coat of arms.

=== Cold War ===
After the war the Combat Group "Cremona" was garrisoned in Turin, while the 21st Infantry Regiment "Cremona" was based in Asti. On 15 October 1945, the combat group was renamed Infantry Division "Cremona". On 1 January 1946, the regiment consisted of a command, a command company, three fusilier battalions, an anti-tank cannons company with British QF 6-pounder anti-tank guns, and a mortar company with British ML 3-inch mortars.

In December 1958, the Regiment "Nizza Cavalleria" transferred its II Tank Squadrons Group in Pinerolo to the 21st Infantry Regiment "Cremona", which disbanded its II Fusilier Battalion and integrated the II Tank Squadrons Group as II Tank Battalion. In 1964, the II Tank Battalion was renamed XIV Tank Battalion and transferred to the Infantry Division "Cremona". In November 1968 the regiment was deployed in the Province of Vercelli to help rescue efforts after heavy floods had devastated the area. For its work in Vercelli the regiment was awarded a Bronze Medal of Civil Merit, which was affixed to the regiment's flag. On 1 October 1969, the 22nd Infantry Regiment "Cremona" was reorganized as 22nd Armored Infantry Regiment "Cremona" ceded two of its fusilier battalions to the 21st Infantry Regiment "Cremona". Afterwards the regiment consisted of the following units:

- 21st Infantry Regiment "Cremona", in Asti
  - Command and Services Company, in Asti
  - I Battalion, in Alessandria
  - II Battalion, in Alessandria
  - III Battalion, in Asti
  - IV Mechanized Battalion, in Fossano, with M113 armored personnel carriers and M47 Patton tanks
  - Anti-tank Company, in Asti

During the 1975 army reform the army disbanded the regimental level and newly independent battalions were granted for the first time their own flags. On 29 October 1975, the 21st Infantry Regiment "Cremona" and the regiment's I Battalion were disbanded. On the same day the 22nd Armored Infantry Regiment "Cremona" and the Infantry Division "Cremona" were disbanded. The next day, on 30 October 1975, the 21st Infantry Regiment's II Battalion in Alessandria became an autonomous unit and was renamed 21st Motorized Infantry Battalion "Alfonsine", while the regiment's IV Mechanized Battalion in Fossano became an autonomous unit and was renamed 22nd Infantry Battalion "Primaro". On the same date the regiment's III Battalion in Asti was reduced to a detachment of the 23rd Infantry Battalion "Como". The 21st Motorized Infantry Battalion "Alfonsine" and 22nd Infantry Battalion "Primaro" were assigned to the Motorized Brigade "Cremona", whose command had been formed on the same date, 30 October 1975, with the personnel of the command of the disbanded Infantry Division "Cremona".

The 21st Motorized Infantry Battalion "Alfonsine" consisted of a command, a command and services company, three motorized companies, and a heavy mortar company equipped with towed 120mm Mod. 63 mortars. At the time the battalion fielded 844 men (41 officers, 94 non-commissioned officers, and 709 soldiers). The 22nd Infantry Battalion "Primaro", which was tasked with training the recruits destined for the Motorized Brigade "Cremona", consisted of a command, a command platoon, and two recruit companies. On 12 November 1976, the President of the Italian Republic Giovanni Leone assigned with decree 846 the flag and traditions of the 21st Infantry Regiment "Cremona" to the 21st Motorized Infantry Battalion "Alfonsine".

From 14 June to 10 November 1983, the battalion's 3rd Motorized Company was attached to the 67th Mechanized Infantry Battalion "Montelungo" for that battalion's deployment to Lebanon with the Multinational Force in Lebanon.

=== Recent times ===
On 1 June 1991, the 21st Motorized Infantry Battalion "Alfonsine" was equipped with M113 armored personnel carriers and renamed 21st Mechanized Infantry Battalion "Alfonsine". On 28 August 1992, the 21st Mechanized Infantry Battalion "Alfonsine" lost its autonomy and the next day entered the reformed 21st Infantry Regiment "Cremona". On 5 November 1996, the 21st Infantry Regiment "Cremona" was transferred from the Mechanized Brigade "Cremona" to the Armored Brigade "Centauro", as the "Cremona" brigade was disbanded 10 days later.

On 5 October 2002, the Armored Brigade "Centauro" was disbanded and 21st Infantry Regiment "Cremona" was transferred to the Cavalry Brigade "Pozzuolo del Friuli". One year later, on 13 October 2003, the 21st Infantry Regiment "Cremona" was disbanded and its flag transferred to the Shrine of the Flags in the Vittoriano in Rome.
