= 6th General Support Logistic Regiment =

Active Italian Army logistics unit

- 6° Reggimento Logistico di Supporto Generale
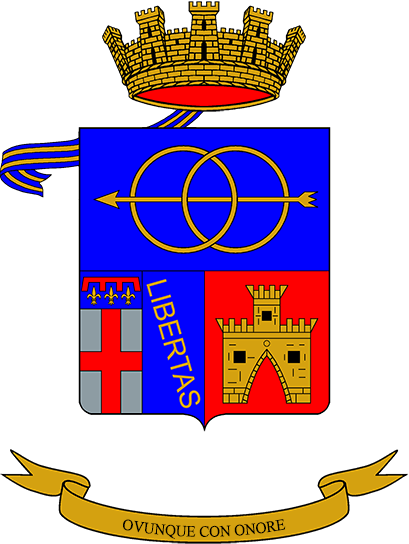
- Regimental coat of arms
- Active: 23 Sept. 1975 — today
- Country: Italy
- Branch: Italian Army
- Role: Military logistics
- Part of: Logistic Support Command
- Garrison/HQ: Budrio
- Motto: "Ovunque con onore"
- Anniversaries: 22 May 1916 - Battle of Asiago
- Decorations: 1× Bronze Medal of Army Valor

Insignia
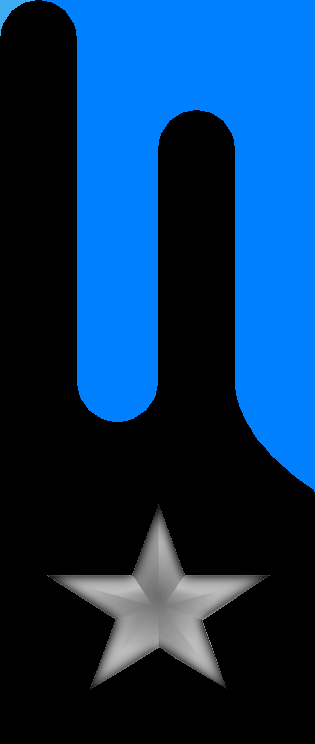
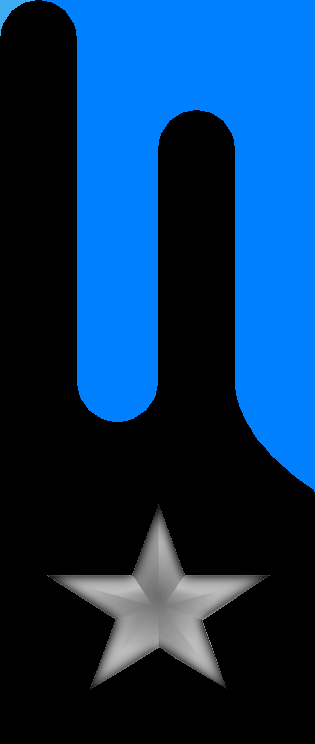
- Unit gorget patches

The 6th General Support Logistic Regiment (Italian: 6° Reggimento Logistico di Supporto Generale) is a military logistics regiment of the Italian Army based in Budrio in the Emilia Romagna. The regiment is assigned to the Logistic Support Command and manages the transport of equipment, personnel, and materiel from the logistic transit areas to military units in operations. The regiment provides, together with the Transit Areas Management Regiment, third line logistic support for the army's brigades and Rapid Deployable Corps – Italy. The regiment's anniversary falls, as for all units of the Italian Army's Transport and Materiel Corps, on 22 May, the anniversary of the Royal Italian Army's first major use of automobiles to transport reinforcements to the Asiago plateau to counter the Austro-Hungarian Asiago Offensive in May 1916.

== History ==
=== World War II ===
The battalion is the spiritual successor of the logistic units of the 20th Infantry Division "Friuli", which was formed in 1939. In April 1941, the division participated in the Invasion of Yugoslavia. On 11 November 1942, after the Allies had landed in French North Africa Italy and Germany occupied Vichy France in Operation Anton. As part of the operation the "Friuli" division was ferried from Tuscany to Corsica, where the division occupied the northern half of the island. In the evening of 8 September 1943, the Armistice of Cassibile, which ended hostilities between the Kingdom of Italy and the Anglo-American Allies, was announced by General Dwight D. Eisenhower on Radio Algiers and by Marshal Pietro Badoglio on Italian radio. The next day the "Friuli" division and its sister division, the 44th Infantry Division "Cremona", fought the German Sturmbrigade Reichsführer SS and 90th Panzergrenadier Division, which were retreating through Corsica to the harbour of Bastia in the island's North.

After operations in Corsica concluded, the "Friuli" division was transferred to Sardinia, where it joined the Italian Co-belligerent Army. In July 1944, the division was shipped to San Giorgio del Sannio in southern Italy, where it was equipped with British weapons and materiel. On 20 September 1944, the division was reorganized and renamed Combat Group "Friuli". On 5 February 1945, the combat group replaced the Polish 5th Infantry Division "Kresowa" of the II Polish Corps on the frontline along the Senio river near Brisighella. From there the combat group advanced with the allied armies and liberated Imola, Castel San Pietro and Bologna.

=== Cold War ===
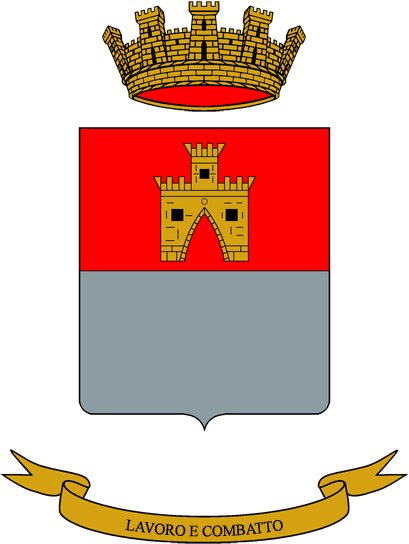
Coat of arms of the Logistic Battalion "Friuli"

On 15 October 1945, the combat group was renamed Infantry Division "Friuli". Initially the division was based in the city of Bolzano, but in 1949 the division returned to Tuscany, where it was based in Florence. On 20 February 1957, the division's logistic units were assigned to the newly formed Service Units Command "Friuli", which was formed on the same date in Sesto Fiorentino. The command consisted of a medical section, a provisions section, a mobile vehicle park, a mobile workshop, and an auto unit. On 20 March 1960, the Service Units Command "Friuli" was disbanded as the following 15 April the division was reduced to Infantry Brigade "Friuli". On 1 July 1960, the mobile vehicle park and mobile workshop merged to form the Resupply, Repairs, Recovery Unit "Friuli".

On 23 September 1975, as part of the 1975 army reform, the Resupply, Repairs, Recovery Unit "Friuli" and Auto Unit "Friuli" merged to form the Logistic Battalion "Friuli", which received the traditions of all preceding logistic, transport, medical, maintenance, and supply units bearing the name "Friuli". The battalion was assigned to the Motorized Brigade "Friuli" and consisted of a command, a command platoon, a supply and transport company, a medium workshop, a vehicle park, and a medical company. At the time the battalion fielded 651 men (37 officers, 82 non-commissioned officers, and 532 soldiers).

On 12 November 1976, the President of the Italian Republic Giovanni Leone granted with decree 846 the battalion a flag.

In 1981, the battalion was reorganized and consisted afterwards of the following units:

- Logistic Battalion "Friuli", in Florence
  - Command and Services Company
  - Supply Company
  - Maintenance Company
  - Medium Transport Company
  - Medical Unit (Reserve)

=== Recent times ===
After the end of the Cold War the Italian Army began to draw down its forces. Consequently, the Motorized Brigade "Friuli" and Mechanized Brigade "Trieste" were ordered to merge into one brigade. On 31 May 1991, the Mechanized Brigade "Trieste" and Logistic Battalion "Friuli" were disbanded. The next day the Logistic Battalion "Trieste" in Budrio was renamed Logistic Battalion "Friuli" and joined the Mechanized Brigade "Friuli". Subsequently, the flag of the Logistic Battalion "Trieste" was transferred to the Shrine of the Flags in the Vittoriano in Rome for safekeeping.

From December 1992 to March 1994, the Logistic Battalion "Friuli" provided personnel to augment the Logistic Battalion "Folgore", which deployed as part of the Unified Task Force to Somalia.

On 27 June 2001, the Logistic Battalion "Friuli" was reorganized and renamed 6th Transport Regiment and transferred to the Logistic Projection Brigade. The regiment received a new coat of arms and consisted of a command, a command and logistic support company, the Transport Battalion "Friuli", and the Movement Control Battalion "Trieste".

From 8 October 2003 to 29 January 2004, the regiment deployed to Iraq as part of the Italian contribution to the Multi-National Force – Iraq. For its work and conduct in Iraq the regiment was awarded a Bronze Medal of Army Valor, which was affixed to the regiment's flag and added to the regiment's coat of arms.

On 1 January 2015, the 6th Transport Regiment was renamed Logistic Regiment "Friuli" and assigned to the Airmobile Brigade "Friuli". Already one year later, on 1 January 2016, the regiment left the brigade and was assigned to the army's Logistic Support Command and renamed 6th General Support Logistic Regiment.

== Organization ==
As of 2024 the 6th General Support Logistic Regiment is organized as follows:

- 6th General Support Logistic Regiment, in Budrio
  - Command and Logistic Support Company
  - Transport Battalion
  - Movement Control Battalion

== See also ==
- Military logistics
