= 20th Infantry Division "Friuli" =

Former infantry division of the Royal Italian Army

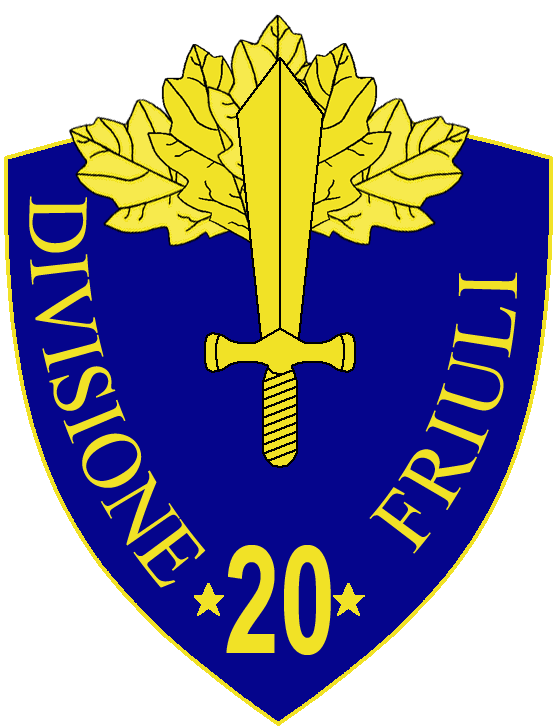
- 20th Infantry Division "Friuli" insignia
- Active: 1939 - 20 September 1944; 20th Infantry Division "Friuli"; 21 September 1944 - 15 October 1945; Combat Group "Friuli"; 16 October 1945 - 15 April 1960; Infantry Division "Friuli"; 16 July 2013 - 1 July 2019; Division "Friuli"
- Country: Kingdom of Italy; Italian Republic
- Branch: Royal Italian Army; Italian Army
- Type: Infantry
- Size: Division
- Garrison/HQ: Livorno / Florence
- Engagements: World War II

Commanders
- Current commander: Major General Flaviano Godio
- Notable commanders: General Giacomo Carboni

Insignia
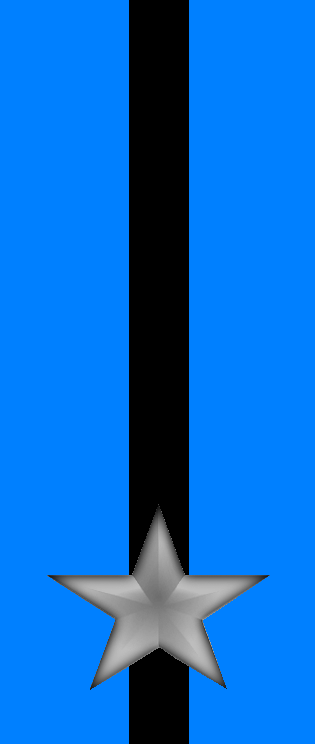
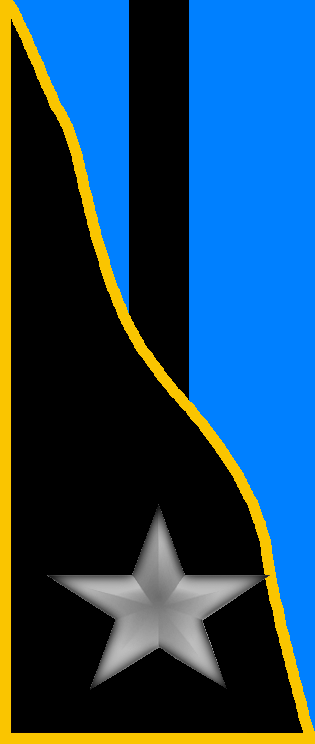
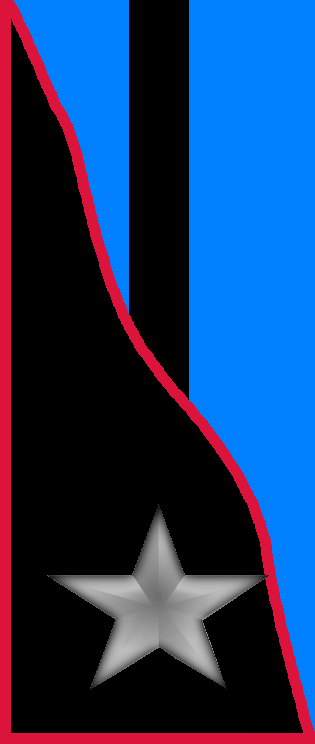
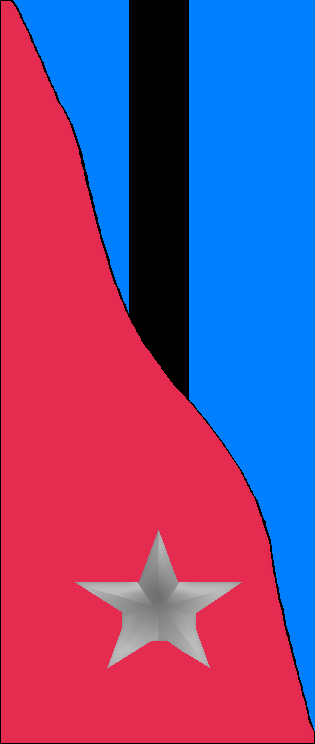
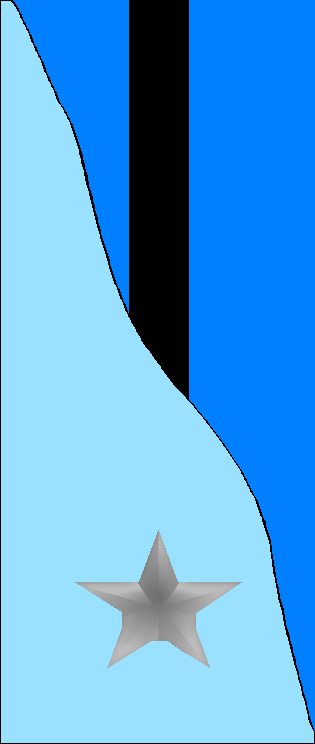
- Identification symbol: Friuli Division gorget patches

The 20th Infantry Division "Friuli" (Italian: 20ª Divisione di fanteria "Friuli") was an infantry division of the Royal Italian Army during World War II. The Friuli was formed on 24 August 1939 by splitting the 20th Infantry Division "Curtatone e Montanara" into the Friuli and the 44th Infantry Division "Cremona". The Friuli was named for the region of Friuli, but based in Tuscany, where it also recruited most of its troops. The division's headquarter and its regiments, with the exception of the 87th Infantry Regiment located in Siena, were based in Livorno. The division served as occupation force on Corsica and fought German units after the Armistice of Cassibile was announced on 8 September 1943. The division then served with the Italian Co-belligerent Army and remained active into the early stages of the Cold War.

== History ==
The division's lineage begins with the Brigade "Friuli" established on 1 November 1884 in Milan with the 87th and 88th infantry regiments.

=== World War I ===
The brigade fought on the Italian front in World War I. On 15 November 1926 the 87th Infantry Regiment was disbanded, followed by the brigade command on 28 December 1926. The 88th Infantry Regiment "Friuli" was transferred to the XX Infantry Brigade, which also included the 21st Infantry Regiment "Cremona" and the 22nd Infantry Regiment "Cremona". The XX Infantry Brigade was the infantry component of the 20th Territorial Division of Livorno, which also included the 7th Artillery Regiment. In 1934 the division changed its name to 20th Infantry Division "Curtatone e Montanara".

On 24 August 1939 the division ceded all its regiments, except the 88th Infantry Regiment "Friuli", to the newly activated 44th Infantry Division "Cremona" and received the 87th Infantry Regiment "Friuli" from the 19th Infantry Division "Venezia". On the same day the XX Infantry Brigade was dissolved, the two remaining infantry regiments came under direct command of the division, and the division received the 35th Artillery Regiment, which had been reactivated on 4 September 1939 and received the name "Friuli" upon entering the division.

=== World War II ===
The Friuli was a reserve force in the Germanasca and Pellice valleys during the Italian invasion of France in June 1940. In April 1941 the division participated in the Invasion of Yugoslavia as part of the VI Army Corps. The division entered combat on 6 April 1941 and advanced into Yugoslavia on 11 April 1941. It reached Loška Dolina and Loški Potok on 12 April 1941. The fighting ceased on 18 April 1941, and on 5 May 1941 the Friuli returned to Italy.

On 5 November 1941 the regimental depot of the 88th Infantry Regiment "Friuli" of the Friuli raised the 125th Infantry Regiment "La Spezia" in Livorno, which was assigned to the newly formed 80th Infantry Division "La Spezia". The remainder of the La Spezia was raised by the regimental depots of the Cremona division.

==== Corsica ====
On 6 October 1942 the division was reformed as a Type 43 Infantry Division, which included the addition of a self-propelled anti-tank battalion, an additional artillery group, increased air-defense capabilities, and more modern field guns. After the Allied landings in French North Africa Italy and Germany occupied Vichy France on 11 November 1942 and the Friuli was ferried from Tuscany to northern Corsica. The division completed the transfer by 20 November 1942 and had its headquarter in Belgodère, while its sister division the 44th Infantry Division "Cremona" occupied southern Corsica and based its headquarter at Cauro. The defense of the island's beaches was the task 225th Coastal Division and 226th Coastal Division.

After the Armistice of Cassibile was announced on 8 September 1943 the Italian forces and French partisans on Corsica fought the German Sturmbrigade Reichführer-SS, 90th Panzergrenadier Division, and Italian XII Paratroopers Battalion of the 184th Infantry Regiment "Nembo", which had crossed over from Sardinia and retreated through Corsica towards the harbor of Bastia in the island's north.

On 13 September elements of the Free French 4th Moroccan Mountain Division landed in Ajaccio to support the Italian efforts to stop the 30,000 retreating German troops, but during the night of 3–4 October the last German units were evacuated from Bastia leaving behind 700 dead and 350 POWs. After the end of operations on Corsica the Friuli was transferred with all other Italian units from Corsica to Sardinia. On 24 November the 88th CC.NN. Legion was renamed as 387th Infantry Regiment "Friuli".

==== Italian Co-belligerent Army ====
Now part of the Italian Co-belligerent Army the Friuli was transferred in July 1944 to San Giorgio del Sannio in southern Italy. On 20 August 1944 the third battalions of the 87th and 88th infantry regiments were replaced by two Granatieri di Sardegna battalions and on 31 August the 387th Infantry Regiment "Friuli" was disbanded. On 20 September 1944 the division was reorganized as Combat Group "Friuli" and equipped with British weapons and materiel. The group entered combat on 5 February 1945 as replacement for the Polish 5th Infantry Division "Kresowa" of the II Polish Corps on the Senio river near Brisighella. From there the Friuli advanced with the allied armies to liberate Imola, Castel San Pietro and Bologna.

=== Cold War ===
On 15 October 1945 the Combat Group "Friuli" was renamed Infantry Division "Friuli", which included the 87th and 88th infantry regiments, the 35th Artillery Regiment, the CXX Mixed Engineer battalion and minor support units. Initially the division was based in the city of Bolzano as part of the IV Military Territorial Command, but in 1949 the division moved to Florence and joined the VII Military Territorial Command. There the division was augmented with the 78th Infantry Regiment "Lupi di Toscana", 8th Field Artillery Regiment and 3rd Light Anti-Air Artillery Regiment. Later the 3rd Light Anti-Air Artillery Regiment was replaced by the 2nd Armored Cavalry Regiment "Piemonte Cavalleria".

On 15 April 1960, the division was reduced to brigade, losing its traditional regiments and receiving new units. See Infantry Brigade "Friuli" for the brigade's history after 1960.

=== Reactivation ===
As part of the 2013 reform of the Italian Army the Airmobile Brigade "Friuli" was to merge with the Cavalry Brigade "Pozzuolo del Friuli". In preparation for the merger the Friuli brigade ceded its name and flag on 16 July 2013 to the newly activated Division "Friuli" in Florence. At its inception the Division "Friuli" commanded the following brigades in Northern Italy:

- Division "Friuli", in Florence
  - Armored Brigade "Ariete", in Pordenone
  - Cavalry Brigade "Pozzuolo del Friuli", in Gorizia
  - Airmobile Brigade "Friuli", in Bologna
  - Paratroopers Brigade "Folgore", in Livorno

However the merger between the two brigades was later canceled and on 1 July 2019 the Division "Friuli" changed its name to Division "Vittorio Veneto" and the name, flag and traditions of the Friuli reverted to the Airmobile Brigade "Friuli".

== Organization ==
=== 20th Infantry Division "Friuli" ===
20th Infantry Division "Friuli" organization in 1940

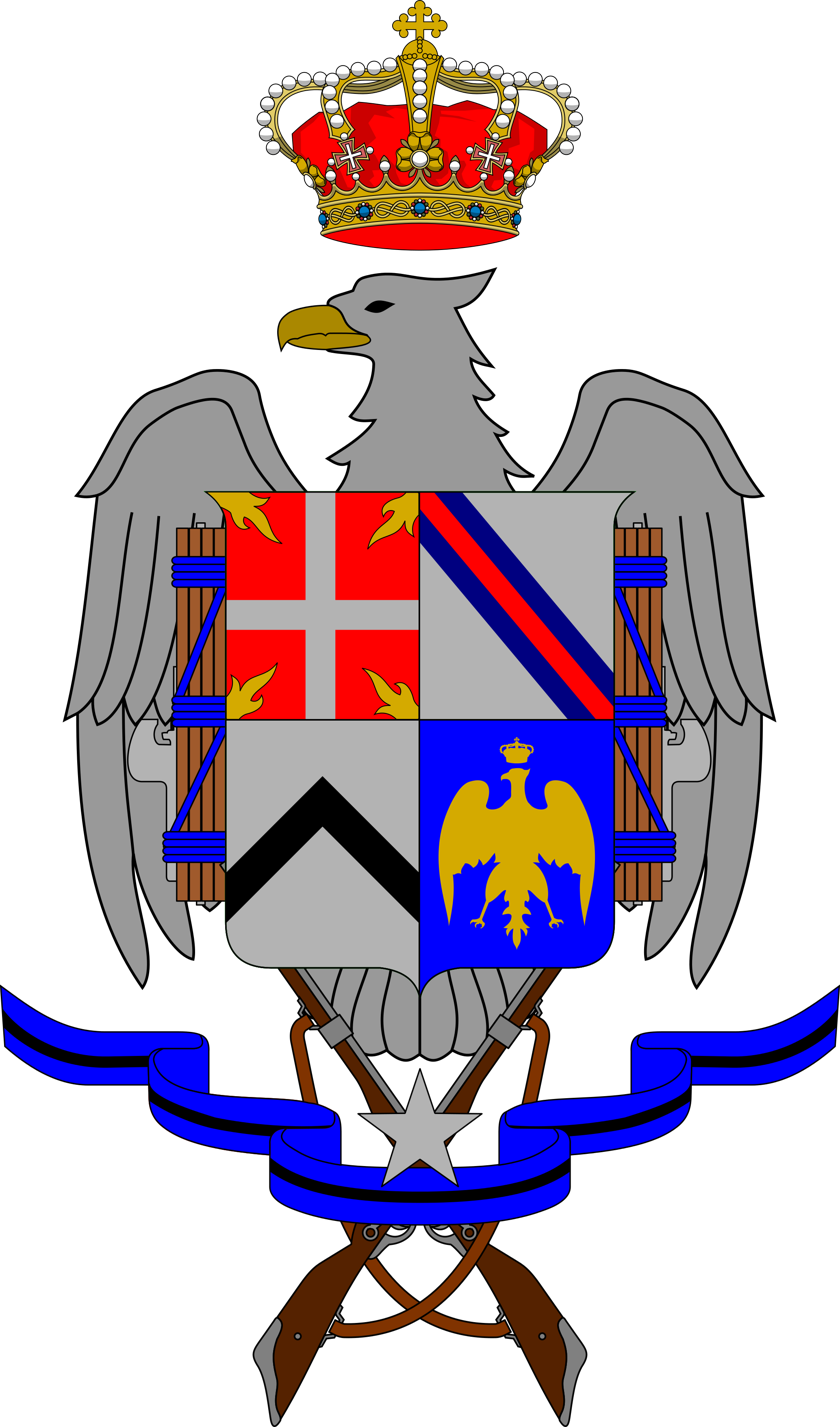
Coat of Arms of the 88th Infantry Regiment "Friuli", 1939

- 20th Infantry Division "Friuli", in Livorno
  - Headquarters
    - Command Company
    - 58th Carabinieri Section
    - 59th Carabinieri Section
    - 79th Field Post Office
    - 20th Infantry Division Command Transport Squad
  - 87th Infantry Regiment "Friuli", in Siena
    - Command Company
    - 3 × Fusilier battalions
    - Support Weapons Battery (65/17 mod. 13 infantry support guns)
    - Mortar Company (81mm mod. 35 mortars)
  - 88th Infantry Regiment "Friuli", in Livorno
    - Command Company
    - 3 × Fusilier battalions
    - Support Weapons Battery (65/17 mod. 13 infantry support guns)
    - Mortar Company (81mm mod. 35 mortars)
  - 35th Artillery Regiment "Friuli", in Livorno
    - Command Unit
    - I Group (100/17 mod. 14 howitzers; transferred from the 19th Artillery Regiment "Venezia")
    - II Group (75/13 mod. 15 mountain guns; transferred from the 19th Artillery Regiment "Venezia"; re-equipped in fall 1942 with 75/18 mod. 34 mountain guns and renumbered III Group in December 1942)
    - III Group (75/13 mod. 15 mountain guns; transferred from the 7th Artillery Regiment "Cremona"; transferred in April 1941 to the 41st Artillery Regiment "Firenze")
    - III Group (75/27 mod. 11 field guns; transferred in April 1941 from the 41st Artillery Regiment "Firenze"; renumbered II Group in December 1942)
    - IV Group (75/18 mod. 34 mountain guns; formed in February 1943)
    - V Anti-Aircraft Group (formed in 1943)
      - 320th Anti-aircraft Battery (20/65 mod. 35 anti-aircraft guns)
      - 356th Anti-aircraft Battery (20/65 mod. 35 anti-aircraft guns)
    - 35th Anti-aircraft Battery (20/65 mod. 35 anti-aircraft guns, entered the V Anti-Aircraft Group in 1943)
    - Ammunition and Supply Unit
  - XX Mortar Battalion (81mm mod. 35 mortars)
  - XX Self-propelled Anti-tank Battalion (Semovente da 47/32 self-propelled guns; formed in 1943)
  - CXX Mixed Engineer Battalion (activated in 1943)
  - 20th Anti-tank Company (47/32 mod. 35 anti-tank guns; disbanded in 1943)
  - 20th Telegraph and Radio Operators Company (entered the CXX Mixed Engineer Battalion in 1943)
  - 52nd Engineer Company (entered the CXX Mixed Engineer Battalion in 1943)
  - 26th Medical Section
    - 81st Field Hospital
    - 82nd Field Hospital
    - 83rd Field Hospital
    - 491st Field Hospital
    - 1 × Surgical unit
  - 14th Supply Section
  - 20th Autocarrette Section
  - 156th Transport Section
  - 577th Transport Section (joined the division in 1943)

Attached from 10 December 1940:

- 88th CC.NN. Legion "Cappellini" (renamed 387th Infantry Regiment "Friuli" on 24 November 1943; disbanded 31 August 1944)
  - Command Company
  - LXXXVIII CC.NN. Battalion
  - XCVI CC.NN. Battalion
  - 96th CC.NN. Machine Gun Company

Attached in Corsica:

- DX Mobile Territorial Battalion

=== Combat Group "Friuli" ===
Combat Group "Friuli" organization

- Combat Group "Friuli"
  - Command Company
  - British X Corps Liaison Squad
  - 87th Infantry Regiment "Friuli"
    - Command Company
    - I Fusilier Battalion
    - II Fusilier Battalion
    - III Grenadier Battalion
    - Anti-tank Company (QF 6-pounder anti-tank guns)
    - Mortar Company (ML 3-inch mortars)
  - 88th Infantry Regiment "Friuli"
    - Command Company
    - I Fusilier Battalion
    - II Fusilier Battalion
    - III Grenadier Battalion
    - Anti-tank Company (QF 6-pounder anti-tank guns)
    - Mortar Company (ML 3-inch mortars)
  - 35th Artillery Regiment "Friuli"
    - Command Unit
    - I Group (QF 25-pounder field guns)
    - II Group (QF 25-pounder field guns)
    - III Group (QF 25-pounder field guns)
    - IV Group (QF 25-pounder field guns)
    - V Anti-tank Group (QF 17-pounder anti-tank guns)
    - VI Anti-aircraft Group (QF 40mm anti-aircraft guns)
  - CXX Mixed Engineer Battalion
    - 2 × Engineer companies
    - 1 × Teleradio company
  - Transport and Supply Company
  - 2 × Engineer field materiel companies
  - Mobile Artillery and Engineer Materiel Depot
  - 26th Medical Section
    - 519th Field Hospital
    - 960th Field Hospital
    - 130th Surgical Unit
  - 316th Bakers Section
  - 13th Maintenance Workshop
  - 3 × Carabinieri sections (316th, and two more)

== Commanding officers ==
The division's commanding officers were:

20th Infantry Division "Friuli":

- Generale di Divisione Vittorio Sogno (1938 - 31 August 1940)
- Generale di Divisione Vito Ferroni1 (1 September 1940 - 30 November 1941)
- Generale di Divisione Giacomo Carboni (1 December 1941 - 30 November 1942)
- Generale di Divisione Ettore Cotronei (1 December 1942 - 20 September 1943)
- Generale di Brigata Ugo De Lorenzis (21 September 1943 - 2 February 1944)
- Generale di Brigata Bartolomeo Pedrotti (3 February 1944 - 20 September 1944)

Combat Group "Friuli":

- Generale di Brigata Bartolomeo Pedrotti (21 September 1944 - 20 October 1944)
- Generale di Brigata Arturo Scattini (21 October 1944 - 15 October 1945)

Division "Friuli":

- Generale di Divisione Flaviano Godio
- Generale di Divisione Carlo Lamanna
