= 78th Infantry Regiment "Lupi di Toscana" =

Active Italian Army infantry unit

- 78° Reggimento Fanteria "Lupi di Toscana"
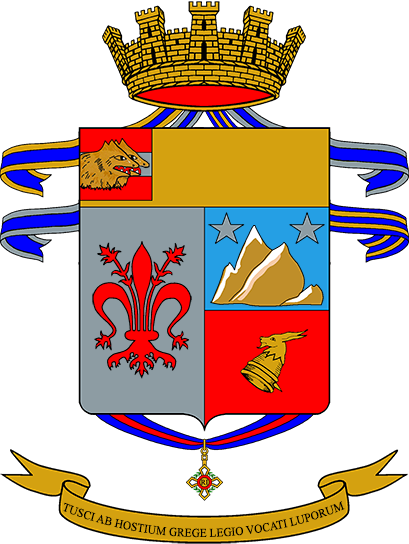
- Regimental coat of arms
- Active: 1 Aug. 1862 – 13 Sept. 1943; 1 April 1947 – 5 Sept. 1995; 1 July 1998 – 31 March 2008; 1 Oct. 2022 – today
- Country: Italy
- Branch: Italian Army
- Part of: Division "Vittorio Veneto"
- Garrison/HQ: Florence
- Motto: "Tusci ab hostium grege legio vocati luporum"
- Anniversaries: 3 November 1916 – Battle of Fajtji hrib
- Engagements: Third Italian War of Independence; Italo-Ethiopian War of 1887–1889; First Italo-Ethiopian War; Italo-Turkish War; World War I Italian Invasion of Albania; World War II
- Decorations: 1× Military Order of Italy; 1× Gold Medal of Military Valor; 2× Silver Medals of Military Valor; 1× Silver Medal of Army Valor

Insignia
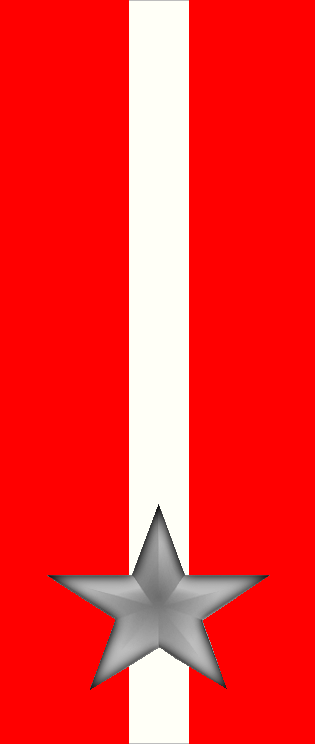
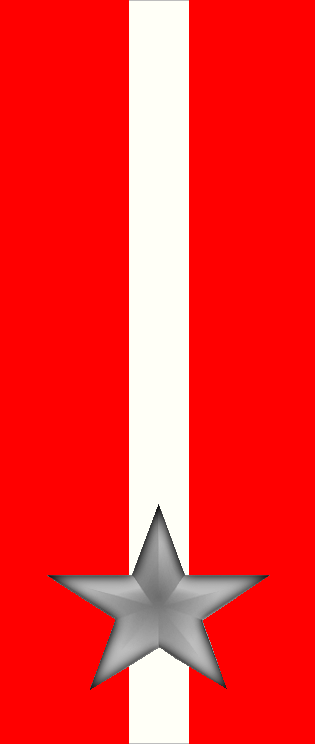
- Regimental gorget patches

The 78th Infantry Regiment "Lupi di Toscana" (Italian: 78° Reggimento Fanteria "Lupi di Toscana" English: "Wolves of Tuscany" ) is an active unit of the Italian Army based in Florence in Tuscany. The regiment is named for the region of Tuscany and part of the Italian Army's infantry arm. On 1 October 2022 the name, flag and traditions of the regiment were assigned to the Command and Tactical Supports Unit "Vittorio Veneto" of the Division "Vittorio Veneto".

The regiment was formed 1862 as a Grenadier regiment, but was transferred to the line infantry in 1871. In 1866 the regiment fought in the Third Italian War of Independence. In World War I the regiment fought on the Italian front. For its conduct in World War I the regiment was awarded Italy's highest military honor the Gold Medal of Military Valor. In 1939 the regiment participated in the Italian invasion of Albania. During World War II the regiment was assigned to the 7th Infantry Division "Lupi di Toscana", which fought in the Italian invasion of France and the Greco-Italian War. In 1942 the division participated in Axis invasion of Vichy France. The division was moving from occupied France to Rome, when it was informed of the Armistice of Cassibile on 8 September 1943. The division's units already in Rome resisted invading German forces until 12 September, but division and regiment's were overcome and disbanded. In 1947 the regiment was reformed and based in Tuscany. In 1975 the regiment was reduced to a battalion sized unit, which in 1992 was reformed as regiment. In 1995 the regiment was disbanded. In 2022 the regiment was reformed as a command and tactical supports unit.

== History ==
=== Formation ===
In 1859, after the conclusion of the Second Italian War of Independence, the Austro-Hungarian Empire was forced to cede the Western half of the Kingdom of Lombardy–Venetia, the region of Lombardy, to the Second French Empire, which transferred the region to the Kingdom of Sardinia. In 1860 the Kingdom of Sardinia annexed the United Provinces of Central Italy, which included the Grand Duchy of Tuscany. In 1861, after Giuseppe Garibaldi's Expedition of the Thousand the Kingdom of Sardinia annexed the Kingdom of the Two Sicilies, which allowed the Sardinians to proclaim the Kingdom of Italy on 17 March 1861.

With the Unification of Italy nearly complete the Royal Italian Army began to form new regiments in the annexed territories. On 1 August 1862 the 1st Grenadiers Regiment (Grenadiers of Sardinia Brigade), 3rd Grenadiers Regiment (Grenadiers of Lombardy Brigade), and 5th Grenadiers Regiment (Grenadiers of Naples Brigade) ceded each two companies to help form the 7th Grenadiers Regiment (Grenadiers of Tuscany Brigade). To complete the new regiment the 19th Infantry Regiment and 20th Infantry Regiment of the Brigade "Brescia" and the 22nd Infantry Regiment of the Brigade "Cremona" and 34th Infantry Regiment of the Brigade "Livorno" ceded each one company, while the 27th Infantry Regiment of the Brigade "Pavia" ceded a depot company. On the same date the 2nd Grenadiers Regiment (Grenadiers of Sardinia Brigade), 4th Grenadiers Regiment (Grenadiers of Lombardy Brigade), and 6th Grenadiers Regiment (Grenadiers of Naples Brigade) ceded each two companies to help form the 8th Grenadiers Regiment (Grenadiers of Tuscany Brigade). To complete the new regiment the 55th Infantry Regiment and 56th Infantry Regiment of the Brigade "Marche" and the 57th Infantry Regiment and 58th Infantry Regiment of the Brigade "Abruzzi" ceded each one company, while the 49th Infantry Regiment of the Brigade "Parma" ceded a depot company. The two new regiments were mustered and initially based in Milan.

After the formation of the 7th and 8th grenadier regiments of the Grenadiers of Tuscany Brigade the army the Royal Italian Army fielded eight grenadier regiments, which all consisted of a staff and three battalions, with six grenadier companies per battalion.

In 1864–65 the regiment operated in the area of Naples and then Sant'Angelo dei Lombardi to suppress the anti-Sardinian revolt in Southern Italy, which had erupted after the Kingdom of Sardinia had annexed the Kingdom of Two Sicilies. In 1866 the brigade participated in the Third Italian War of Independence.

On 1 April 1871 the Grenadiers of Tuscany Brigade and its two regiments were transferred from the Grenadiers speciality to the line infantry. On the same date the brigade was renamed Brigade "Toscana", and its two regiments became the 77th Infantry Regiment and 78th Infantry Regiment. On 25 October of the same year the brigade level was abolished and the two regiments of the Brigade "Toscana" were renamed 77th Infantry Regiment "Toscana", respectively 78th Infantry Regiment "Toscana".

On 2 January 1881 the brigade level was reintroduced and the two regiments were renamed again as 77th Infantry Regiment (Brigade "Toscana") and 78th Infantry Regiment (Brigade "Toscana").

On 1 November 1884 the regiment ceded some of its companies to help form the 84th Infantry Regiment (Brigade "Venezia"). In 1887 the regiment's 4th Company participated in the Italo-Ethiopian War of 1887–1889. In 1895–96 the regiment provided nine officers and 280 enlisted for units deployed to Italian Eritrea for the First Italo-Ethiopian War. In 1911–12 the regiment provided 23 officers and 1,306 enlisted to augment units fighting in the Italo-Turkish War.

=== World War I ===
At the outbreak of World War I, the Brigade "Toscana" formed, together with the Brigade "Sicilia" and the 16th Field Artillery Regiment, the 6th Division. At the time the 78th Infantry Regiment consisted of three battalions, each of which fielded four fusilier companies and one machine gun section. In January 1915 the regimental depot of the 78th Infantry Regiment in Bergamo formed the 160th Infantry Regiment (Brigade "Milano"). After Italy's entry into the war on 23 May 1915 the Brigade "Toscana" was deployed to the Italian front: in 1915 the regiment operated against Austro-Hungarian forces in the Giudicarie sector and on Monte Melino. In August 1916 the regiment fought in the Sixth Battle of the Isonzo on the slopes of Monte Sabotino. In fall of the same year the brigade was on the Karst plateau, where it fought in October in the Eighth Battle of the Isonzo for control of the summit of Veliki Hribach, and in November in the Ninth Battle of the Isonzo on the slopes of Fajtji hrib. On 28 December 1916 both regiments of the brigade were awarded a Silver Medal of Military Valor for their conduct during the Sixth Battle of the Isonzo on Monte Sabotino.

In February 1917 the infantry regiments of the Brigade "Toscana" ceded both two companies to help from the infantry regiments of the newly formed Brigade "Murge". In May 1917 the brigade fought in the Tenth Battle of the Isonzo in the Monfalcone sector and in August of the same year in the Eleventh Battle of the Isonzo along the Timavo river near Duino. In December 1917 the brigade operated on the Sette Comuni plateau on the slopes of Col d'Echele and Col de Rosso. In June 1918 the brigade was in the Adamello sector and fought on the slopes of the Cornone di Blumone. In October 1918 the brigade was deployed on the Piave river for the Battle of Vittorio Veneto and after the breakthrough of the Austro-Hungarian lines the brigade advanced to the Tagliamento river.

After the war the two regiments of the brigade were both awarded a Gold Medal of Military Valor for their conduct during the war, and the 78th Infantry Regiment was awarded a second Silver Medal of Military Valor for its conduct on Col d'Echele and Col de Rosso. The royal decree awarding the two regiments the Gold Medal of Military Valor also officialized the brigade's nickname "Lupi" (Wolves), which the brigade had gained during the war.

=== Interwar years ===
On 1 November 1926 the Brigade "Toscana" was renamed VII Infantry Brigade. The brigade was the infantry component of the 7th Territorial Division of Brescia. On the same date the brigade's two infantry regiments were renamed 77th Infantry Regiment "Toscana", respectively 78th Infantry Regiment "Toscana". The VII Infantry Brigade also included the 50th Infantry Regiment "Parma" from the disbanded Brigade "Parma".

In 1934, the 7th Territorial Division of Brescia changed its name to 7th Infantry Division "Leonessa". A name change that also extended to the division's infantry brigade. In 1935–36 the regiment provided eight officers and 515 enlisted to the 62nd Infantry Regiment "Sicilia", which was deployed to East Africa for the Second Italo-Ethiopian War. The regiment also provided personnel for the formation of the LXX Replacements Battalion and the X Special Battalion, which were deployed to East Africa in support roles.

On 15 December 1938 the division disbanded the VII Infantry Brigade "Leonessa" and changed its name to 7th Infantry Division "Lupi di Toscana" – a name change that also applied to the 77th and 78th infantry regiments. In April 1939 the division participated in the Italian invasion of Albania. On 12 September 1939 the division ceded the 50th Infantry Regiment "Parma" to the newly activated 49th Infantry Division "Parma".

=== World War II ===
At the outbreak of World War II the regiment consisted of a command, a command company, three fusilier battalions, a support weapons battery equipped with 65/17 infantry support guns, and a mortar company equipped with 81mm Mod. 35 mortars. In June 1940 the division participated in the invasion of France. In fall of 1940 the division was sent to Albania, where Italian units were heavily engaged against Greek forces in the Greco-Italian War. There the division defended Tepelenë and then fought in the Zagori valley. After the German invasion of Greece the division remained in Epirus until October 1941 as occupation force.

On 3–9 November 1942 the division participated in Case Anton the Axis invasion of Vichy France. Afterwards the division remained on garrison duty in occupied France. On 3 September 1943 the division was ordered to move to Rome. Between 6–8 September three infantry battalions and some minor units of the division arrived in Lazio. The battalions were ordered to defend the airfields at Furbara and Cerveteri, where the Italian government hoped the American 82nd Airborne Division would land to support the Royal Italian Army's defense of Rome once the Armistice of Cassibile would be announced. After the armistice was announced on 8 September 1943 the Lupi di Toscana units in Lazio resisted invading German forces until 12 September, while the main body of the division was caught and disbanded by German forces in Liguria on 9 September 1943.

=== Cold War ===
On 1 April 1947 the 78th Infantry Regiment "Lupi di Toscana" was reformed in Florence. The regiment consisted of a command, a command company, three fusilier battalions, a mortar company equipped with 81mm Mod. 35 mortars, and an anti-tank cannons company equipped with QF 6-pounder anti-tank guns. In 1949 the regiment was assigned to the Infantry Division "Friuli", which also included the 87th Infantry Regiment "Friuli" and 88th Infantry Regiment "Friuli".

On 30 November 1958 the 87th Infantry Regiment "Friuli" and 88th Infantry Regiment "Friuli" were disbanded. Their remaining personnel was merged into two battalions, which were then assigned to the 78th Infantry Regiment "Lupi di Toscana" as II Battalion and III Battalion. On 15 April 1960 the Infantry Division "Friuli" was reduced to Infantry Brigade "Friuli" with the 78th Infantry Regiment "Lupi di Toscana" as the brigade's only infantry regiment. Afterwards the regiment was organized as follows:.

- 78th Infantry Regiment "Lupi di Toscana", in Scandicci
  - Command Company, in Scandicci
  - I Battalion, in Scandicci
  - II Battalion, in Pistoia
  - III Battalion, in Scandicci
  - Anti-tank Company, in Scandicci

During the 1975 army reform the Italian Army disbanded the regimental level and newly independent battalions were granted for the first time their own flags. On 22 September 1975 the 78th Infantry Regiment "Lupi di Toscana" was disbanded. The next day the regiment's I Battalion in Scandicci was renamed 78th Motorized Infantry Battalion "Lupi di Toscana" and assigned the flag and traditions of the 78th Infantry Regiment "Lupi di Toscana", while the II Battalion in Pistoia was renamed 87th Motorized Infantry Battalion "Senio" and assigned the flag and traditions of the 87th Infantry Regiment "Friuli". Both battalions were assigned to the Motorized Brigade "Friuli" and consisted of a command, a command and services company, three motorized companies, and a heavy mortar company equipped with towed 120mm Mod. 63 mortars. The regiment's III Battalion was put into reserve status and its equipment stored in Arezzo with the 225th Infantry Regiment "Arezzo", which was the training battalion of the Motorized Brigade "Friuli". In case of war the battalion would have been activated as 35th Motorized Infantry Battalion "Pistoia", which would have received the flag and traditions of the 35th Infantry Regiment "Pistoia". At the time the 78th Motorized Infantry Battalion "Lupi di Toscana" fielded 844 men (41 officers, 94 non-commissioned officers, and 709 soldiers).

=== Recent times ===
On 1 January 1991 battalion was reorganized as a mechanized unit and renamed 78th Mechanized Infantry Battalion "Lupi di Toscana". The battalion consisted now of a command, a command and services company, three mechanized companies equipped with M113 armored personnel carriers, and a mortar company equipped with M106 mortar carriers with 120mm Mod. 63 mortars. On 14 September 1992 the 78th Mechanized Infantry Battalion "Lupi di Toscana" lost its autonomy and the next day the battalion entered the reformed 78th Infantry Regiment "Lupi di Toscana" as I Mechanized Battalion.

From 20 August to 5 December 1993 one company of the regiment participated in the United Nations Operation in Somalia II. After the company's return to Italy the regiment was awarded a Silver Medal of Army Valor for the company's conduct in Somalia. On 5 September 1995 the 78th Infantry Regiment "Lupi di Toscana" was disbanded and the flag of the regiment was transferred on 6 September to the Shrine of the Flags in the Vittoriano in Rome.

On 1 July 1998 the regiment was reformed in Scandicci as 78th Volunteer Training Regiment "Lupi di Toscana", but it was once more disbanded on 31 March 2008.

=== Reactivation ===
On 1 October 2022, the name, flag and traditions of the 78th Infantry Regiment "Lupi di Toscana" were assigned to the Command and Tactical Supports Unit "Vittorio Veneto" of the Division "Vittorio Veneto". On the same day the unit was renamed 78th Command and Tactical Supports Unit "Lupi di Toscana".

== Organization ==
As of 2026 the unit is organized as follows:

- 78th Command and Tactical Supports Unit "Lupi di Toscana", in Florence
  - Support Company
  - Logistic and Tactical Support Battalion
    - Deployment Support Company
    - Transport Company

== See also ==
- Division "Vittorio Veneto"
