= 87th Infantry Regiment "Friuli" =

Active Italian Army infantry unit

- 87° Reggimento Fanteria "Friuli"
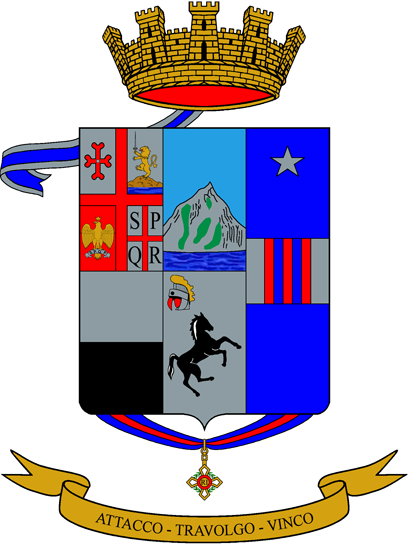
- Regimental coat of arms
- Active: 1 Nov. 1884 – 15 Nov. 1926; 9 March 1937 – 30 Nov. 1958; 23 Sept. 1975 – 31 Jan. 1991; 1 Oct. 2022 – today
- Country: Italy
- Branch: Italian Army
- Part of: Airmobile Brigade "Friuli"
- Garrison/HQ: Bologna
- Mottos: "Attacco, travolgo, vinco"
- Anniversaries: 29 June 1916 – Battle of Monte Mosciagh
- Decorations: 1× Military Order of Italy; 1× Silver Medal of Military Valor

Insignia
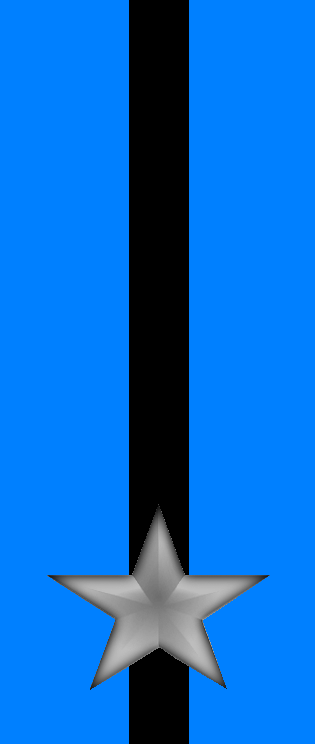
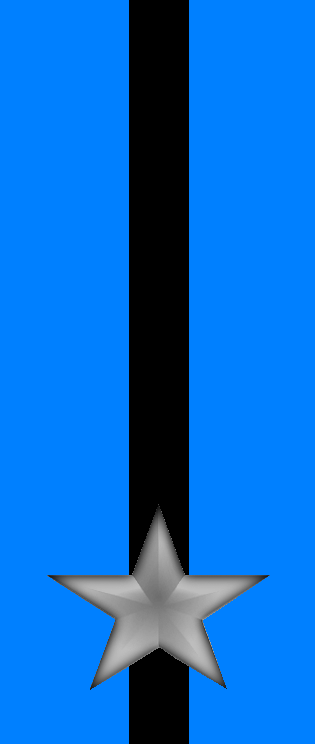
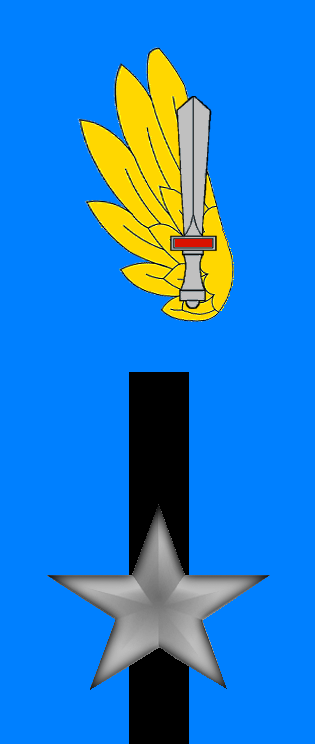
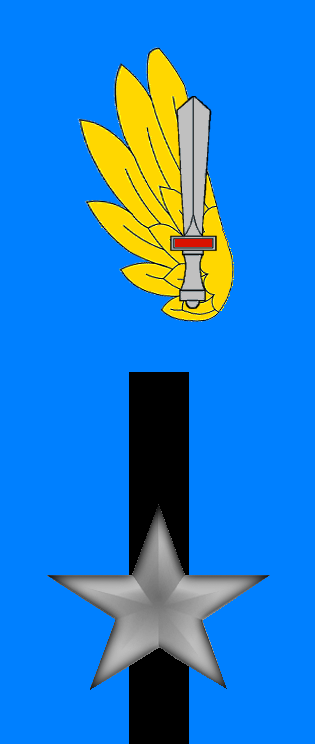
- Regimental gorget patches

The 87th Infantry Regiment "Friuli" (Italian: 87° Reggimento Fanteria "Friuli") is an active unit of the Italian Army based in Bologna in the Emilia-Romagna. The regiment is named for the region of Friuli and part of the Italian Army's infantry arm. On 1 October 2022 the name, flag and traditions of the regiment were assigned to the Command and Tactical Supports Unit "Friuli" of the Airmobile Brigade "Friuli".

The regiment was one of sixteen infantry regiments formed on 1 November 1884. During World War I the regiment fought on the Italian front. The regiment was disbanded in 1926 and reformed in March 1937. During World War II the regiment was assigned to the 20th Infantry Division "Friuli", with which it participated in the invasion of Yugoslavia. In late 1942 the Friuli division was sent as occupation force to the island of Corsica, where the division was informed of the Armistice of Cassibile on 8 September 1943. The division immediately engaged German forces in combat and joined the Italian Co-belligerent Army. Reorganized as Combat Group "Friuli" and assigned to the II Polish Corps group and regiment fought in the Italian Campaign. The regiment was disbanded in 1958 and reformed in 1975 as a battalion sized motorized unit. Disbanded again in 1991 the regiment was reformed in 2022 as a command and tactical supports unit.

== History ==
=== Formation ===
On 1 November 1884 the 87th Infantry Regiment (Brigade "Friuli") was formed in Milan with companies ceded by the 23rd Infantry Regiment (Brigade "Como"), 24th Infantry Regiment (Brigade "Como"), 45th Infantry Regiment (Brigade "Reggio"), 51st Infantry Regiment (Brigade "Alpi"), and 67th Infantry Regiment (Brigade "Palermo"). On the same day the 88th Infantry Regiment (Brigade "Friuli") was formed in Milan with companies ceded by the 46th Infantry Regiment (Brigade "Reggio"), 52nd Infantry Regiment (Brigade "Alpi"), 68th Infantry Regiment (Brigade "Palermo"), and by the 63rd Infantry Regiment and 64th Infantry Regiment of the Brigade "Cagliari". Both regiments consisted of a staff and three battalions, with four companies per battalion. Together the two regiments formed the Brigade "Friuli".

In 1895–96 the regiment provided 13 officers and 242 enlisted for units deployed to Italian Eritrea for the First Italo-Ethiopian War. In 1911–12 the regiment provided three officers and 1,030 enlisted to augment units fighting in the Italo-Turkish War. In 1913, after the end Italo-Turkish War, the regiment was deployed to Libya on occupation duty. In 1914 the regiment returned to its base in Siena.

=== World War I ===
At the outbreak of World War I, the Brigade "Friuli" formed, together with the Brigade "Cremona" and the 32nd Field Artillery Regiment, the 16th Division. At the time the 87th Infantry Regiment consisted of three battalions, each of which fielded four fusilier companies and one machine gun section. After Italy's entry into the war on 23 May 1915 the Brigade "Friuli" was deployed to the Italian front: in 1915 the regiment operated against Austro-Hungarian forces at the Monfalcone. On 30 November 1915 the regimental depot of the 87th Infantry Regiment in Siena formed the 214th Infantry Regiment (Brigade "Arno"). In June 1916 the brigade was transferred to the Sette Comuni plateau as reinforcements during the Battle of Asiago, where the regiment battled for control of Monte Mosciagh. In October 1917 the brigade fought in the Battle of Caporetto near Bovec. In 1918 the brigade operated in the Vallagarina.

=== Interwar years ===
On 15 November 1926 the 87th Infantry Regiment was disbanded and its two battalions transferred to the 90th Infantry Regiment "Salerno" and the 91st Infantry Regiment "Basilicata". On 28 December 1926 the command of the Brigade "Friuli" was disbanded and on 31 December the 88th Infantry Regiment, now renamed 88th Infantry Regiment "Friuli", was assigned to the XX Infantry Brigade, which was the infantry component of the 20th Territorial Division of Livorno.

On 9 March 1937 the 70th Infantry Regiment "Ancona" was transferred from the 19th Infantry Division "Gavinana" to the 61st Infantry Division "Sirte" in Libya. On the same day the "Gavinana" division reformed the 87th Infantry Regiment "Friuli" in Arezzo as replacement for the 70th Infantry Regiment "Ancona". On 1 November 1937 the 87th Infantry Regiment "Friuli" was reorganized as a training unit tasked with training infantry reserve officer cadets. On 15 September 1939 the regiment was transferred to the 20th Infantry Division "Friuli". In early 1940 the regiment transferred its training functions to the newly formed Infantry Reserve Officer Cadets School in Arezzo.

=== World War II ===
At the outbreak of World War II the regiment consisted of a command, a command company, three fusilier battalions, a support weapons battery equipped with 65/17 infantry support guns, and a mortar company equipped with 81mm Mod. 35 mortars. In the course of the war the regiment replaced the World War I era 65/17 infantry support guns with modern 47/32 anti-tank guns.

During the Italian invasion of France in June 1940 the Friuli division was in the Army reserve. In April 1941 the division participated in the Invasion of Yugoslavia as part of the VI Army Corps. After the Allied landings in French North Africa Italy and Germany occupied Vichy France on 11 November 1942 and the Friuli was transferred to northern Corsica.

After the announcement of the Armistice of Cassibile on 8 September 1943 the Italian forces and French partisans on Corsica fought the German Sturmbrigade Reichführer-SS, 90th Panzergrenadier Division, and Italian XII Paratroopers Battalion of the 184th Paratroopers Regiment "Nembo", which had crossed over from Sardinia and retreated through Corsica towards the harbor of Bastia in the island's north. After the end of operations on Corsica the Friuli was transferred to Sardinia and then in July 1944 to San Giorgio del Sannio in southern Italy.

On 20 September 1944 the division was reorganized as Combat Group "Friuli". Now part of the Italian Co-belligerent Army and the combat group received British weapons, uniforms and materiel. On 5 February 1945 the Friuli entered combat and replaced the Polish 5th Infantry Division "Kresowa" of the II Polish Corps on the Senio river near Brisighella. From there the Friuli advanced with the allied armies to liberate Imola, Castel San Pietro and Bologna. For its service during the Italian Campaign the 87th Infantry Regiment "Friuli" was awarded a Silver Medal of Military Valor.

=== Cold War ===
On 15 October 1945 the Combat Group "Friuli" was renamed Infantry Division "Friuli". In 1946 the division moved to South Tyrol and the 87th Infantry Regiment "Friuli" was based in Bolzano. Already in 1947 the regiment moved from Bolzano to Bologna and in 1949 to Livorno in Tuscany. The same year the Friuli division moved to Florence, where it was augmented with the 78th Infantry Regiment "Lupi di Toscana". On 1 September 1950 the 87th Infantry Regiment "Friuli" ceded its II Battalion to the 82nd Infantry Regiment "Torino", which was reformed on that date in the city of Forlì. On 30 November 1958 the 87th Infantry Regiment "Friuli" and 88th Infantry Regiment "Friuli" were disbanded. Their remaining personnel was merged into two battalions, which were then assigned to the 78th Infantry Regiment "Lupi di Toscana" as II Battalion and III Battalion. On 15 April 1960 the Infantry Division "Friuli" was reduced to Infantry Brigade "Friuli" with the 78th Infantry Regiment "Lupi di Toscana" as the brigade's only infantry regiment.

During the 1975 army reform the Italian Army disbanded the regimental level and newly independent battalions were granted for the first time their own flags. On 22 September 1975 the 78th Infantry Regiment "Lupi di Toscana" was disbanded and the next day the regiment's II Battalion in Pistoia was renamed 87th Motorized Infantry Battalion "Senio". To avoid confusion with support units of the Motorized Brigade "Friuli" the battalion's name was changed from "Friuli" to "Senio", the river, where the regiment had distinguished itself in February 1945. The battalion was assigned to the Motorized Brigade "Friuli" and consisted of a command, a command and services company, three motorized companies, and a heavy mortar company with towed with 120mm Mod. 63 mortars. At the time the battalion fielded 844 men (41 officers, 94 non-commissioned officers, and 709 soldiers). On 12 November 1976 the President of the Italian Republic Giovanni Leone assigned with decree 846 the flag and traditions of the 87th Infantry Regiment "Friuli" to the battalion.

With the end of the Cold War the Italian Army began to draw down its forces and on 31 January 1991 the 87th Motorized Infantry Battalion "Senio" was disbanded and on 6 March 1991 the flag of the 87th Infantry Regiment "Friuli" was transferred to the Shrine of the Flags in the Vittoriano in Rome.

=== Reactivation ===
On 1 October 2022, the name, flag and traditions of the 87th Infantry Regiment "Friuli" were assigned to the Command and Tactical Supports Unit "Friuli" of the Airmobile Brigade "Friuli". On the same day the unit was renamed 87th Command and Tactical Supports Unit "Friuli".

== Organization ==
As of 2024 the 87th Command and Tactical Supports Unit "Friuli" is organized as follows:

- 87th Command and Tactical Supports Unit "Friuli", in Bologna
  - Command and Logistic Support Company
  - Signal Company

== See also ==
- Airmobile Brigade "Friuli"
