= Airmobile Brigade "Friuli" =

- Brigata Aeromobile "Friuli"
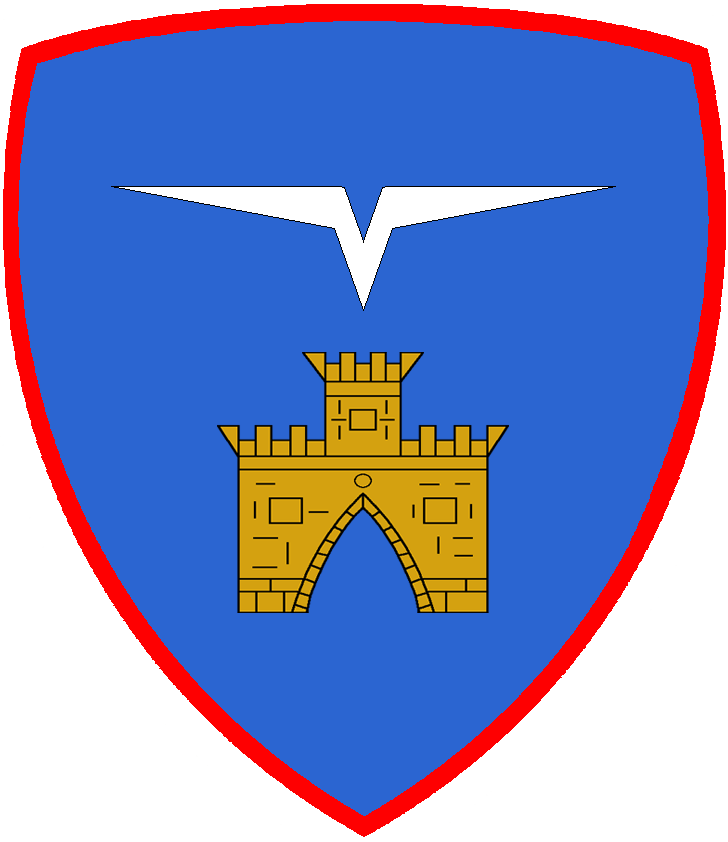
- Coat of Arms of the Airmobile Brigade "Friuli"
- Active: 1 November 1884 - 28 December 1926; Infantry Brigade "Friuli"; 15 April 1960 - 23 September 1975; Infantry Brigade "Friuli"; 24 September 1975 - 1 June 1991; Motorized Brigade "Friuli"; 2 June 1991 - 1 May 2000; Mechanized Brigade "Friuli"; 2 May 2000 - today Airmobile Brigade "Friuli"
- Country: Italy
- Branch: Italian Army
- Role: Air Assault
- Size: Brigade
- Part of: Division "Vittorio Veneto"
- Garrison/HQ: Bologna
- Colors: light blue
- Engagements: World War I Somalia UNITAF; Bosnia SFOR; Kosovo KFOR; Iraq MNF-I; Afghanistan ISAF

Commanders
- Current commander: Brigadier Luigi Francavilla

The Airmobile Brigade "Friuli" (Italian: Brigata Aeromobile "Friuli") is an airmobile brigade of the Italian Army, based mainly in the Emilia-Romagna region. The brigade was part of the 1st Defence Forces Command until it was transferred to the Division "Friuli". The brigade's coat of arms depicts a stylized version of the Rocca di Monfalcone castle near the city of Monfalcone in the Friuli region, where the brigade distinguished itself during World War I. Since 1 July 2019 the brigade is part of the Division "Vittorio Veneto".

== History ==
The Infantry Brigade "Friuli" was formed on 1 November 1884 in Milan and consisted of the 87th Infantry Regiment "Friuli" and the 88th Infantry Regiment "Friuli". At the outbreak of hostilities between Kingdom of Italy and the Austrian Empire in 1915 the Friuli along with the Infantry Brigade "Cremona" formed the 16th Division of the Line. The brigade fought bravely in World War I but was dissolved after the war on 28 December 1926.

=== World War II ===
The 20th Infantry Division "Friuli" was formed on 24 August 1939 by renaming the existing 20th Infantry Division "Curtatone e Montanara" in Livorno. The division was immediately split to create the 44th Infantry Division "Cremona", but it retained its traditional regiments: the 87th and 88th infantry regiments. To bring the "Friuli" division to full strength it received the 35th Artillery Regiment on 4 September 1939.

After the armistice between Italy and the Allies on 3 September 1943 the "Friuli" fought on the allied side as part of the Italian Co-Belligerent Army and liberated Bologna towards the war's end.

=== Cold War ===
After World War II the division was the only division of the IV Military Territorial Command and based in the city of Bolzano. In 1949 the division moved to Florence where it joined the VII Military Territorial Command. There the division was augmented with the 78th Infantry Regiment "Lupi di Toscana", 8th Field Artillery Regiment and 3rd Light Anti-Aircraft Artillery Regiment. Later the 3rd Light Anti-Air Artillery Regiment was replaced by the 2nd Armored Cavalry Regiment "Piemonte Cavalleria".

In September 1956 the Infantry Division "Friuli" and the Infantry Division "Trieste" entered the newly raised VI Army Corps.

==== Infantry Brigade "Friuli" ====
On 15 April 1960, the Infantry Division "Friuli" was reduced to brigade, losing its traditional regiments. The brigade was headquartered in Florence and most of its units stationed in the surrounding region of Tuscany. By 1964 the structure of the Infantry Brigade "Friuli" was:

- Infantry Brigade "Friuli", in Florence
  - 78th Infantry Regiment "Lupi di Toscana", in Scandicci
    - Command and Services Company, in Scandicci
    - I Infantry Battalion, in Scandicci
    - II Infantry Battalion, in Pistoia
    - III Infantry Battalion, in Scandicci
    - Regimental Anti-tank Company, in Scandicci (anti-tank guided missiles and M47 tanks)
  - Armored Battalion "Friuli", in Florence (M26 Pershing tanks and M113 armoured personnel carriers)
  - Field Artillery Group "Friuli", in Pistoia (M14/61 105 mm towed howitzers)
  - Light Aviation Unit "Friuli", at Florence-Peretola Air Base (L-21B Super Cub)
  - Engineer Company "Friuli", in Florence
  - Signal Company "Friuli", in Florence
  - Supply, Repairs, Recovery Unit "Friuli", in Coverciano
  - Transport Unit "Friuli", in Coverciano

The brigade stored materiel and equipment, including M1 40/56 anti-aircraft cannons, for the Light Anti-aircraft Artillery Group "Friuli" in Pistoia, which in case of war would have been activated and filled with reservists from Tuscany.

==== Motorized Brigade "Friuli" ====
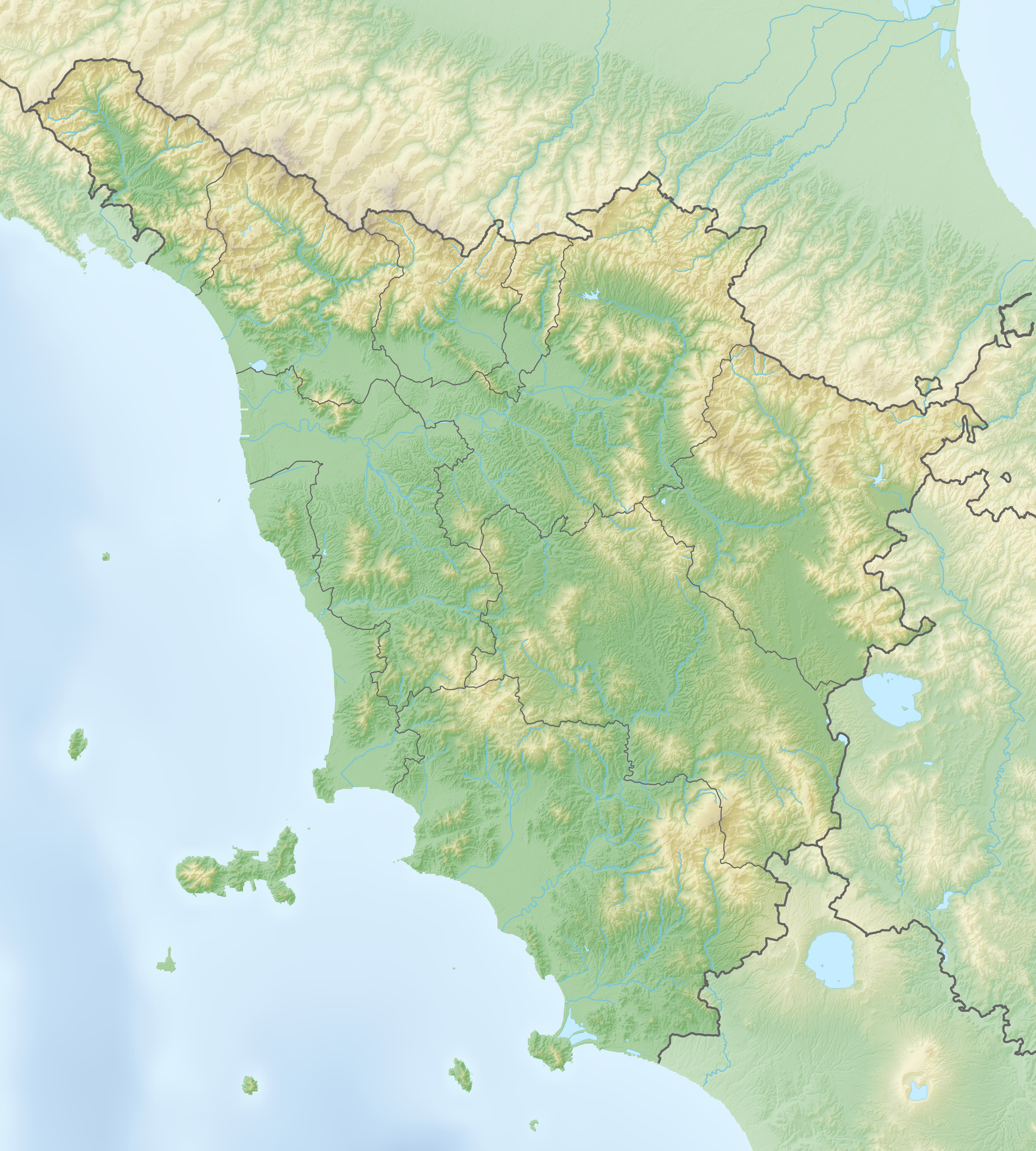
Friuli units in 1989

With the abolishment of the regimental level during the 1975 army reform the 78th Regiment was disbanded on 23 September 1975, and the brigade changed its name to Motorized Brigade "Friuli". The new structure was:

- Motorized Brigade "Friuli", in Florence
  - Command and Signal Unit "Friuli", in Florence
  - 78th Motorized Infantry Battalion "Lupi di Toscana", in Scandicci
  - 87th Motorized Infantry Battalion "Senio", in Pistoia
  - 225th Infantry Battalion "Arezzo" (Recruits Training), in Arezzo
  - 19th Armored Battalion "M.O. Tumiati", in Florence (M47 Patton tanks and M113 APCs)
  - 35th Field Artillery Group "Riolo", in Pistoia (M114 155 mm towed howitzers)
  - Logistic Battalion "Friuli", in Coverciano
  - Anti-tank Company "Friuli", in Scandicci (BGM-71 TOW anti-tank guided missiles)
  - Engineer Company "Friuli", in Florence

The brigade also stored the equipment for a third maneuver battalion in Arezzo, which in case of war would have been filled with reservists, and recruits from the 225th Infantry (Recruits Training) Battalion "Arezzo", and would have been named 35th Motorized Infantry Battalion "Pistoia".

On 1 January 1986, the "Friuli" Brigade and the Paratroopers Brigade "Folgore", in conjunction with some units of the Light Army Aviation and the Navy's San Marco Regiment, became the Rapid Intervention Forces of the Italian Military, deployable on short notice for out of area missions.

==== Mechanized Brigade "Friuli" ====
After the end of the Cold War and the subsequent reduction of the Italian Army the Friuli merged with the Mechanized Brigade "Trieste" on 1 June 1991. Although the new brigade was named Mechanized Brigade "Friuli", it was headquartered in Bologna in the building of the Trieste's staff. Before the merger the 87th Motorized Infantry Battalion "Senio" had been disbanded on 31 January 1991, and the 35th Field Artillery Group "Riolo" and the 19th Armored Battalion on 6 May 1991.

After the reintroduction of the regimental level in 1992 the brigade was composed of the following units on 1 January 1993:

- Mechanized Brigade "Friuli", in Bologna
  - Command and Signal Unit "Friuli", in Bologna (renamed Command and Tactical Supports Unit after merging with the Engineer Company "Friuli" in 1993)
  - 4th Tank Regiment, in Ozzano dell'Emilia (Leopard 1A2 main battle tanks; renamed 33rd Tank Regiment on 1 September 1993)
  - 6th Bersaglieri Regiment, in Bologna (VCC-2 armoured personnel carriers)
  - 66th Mechanized Infantry Battalion "Valtellina", in Forlì (VCC-2 armoured personnel carriers; later renamed 66th Infantry Regiment "Trieste")
  - 78th Infantry Regiment "Lupi di Toscana", in Scandicci (VCC-2 armoured personnel carriers)
  - 225th Regiment "Arezzo", in Arezzo (replaced by the 121st Infantry Regiment "Macerata" on 15 September 1993)
  - 21st Self-propelled Artillery Group "Romagna", in Bologna (M109 155 mm self-propelled howitzers; later renamed 21st Self-propelled Field Artillery Regiment "Trieste")
  - Logistic Battalion "Friuli", in Budrio
  - Engineer Company "Friuli", in Bologna (merged in September 1993 into the Command and Signal Unit)

==== Airmobile Brigade "Friuli" ====
On 7 October 1995 the brigade received a cavalry regiment: the 4th Alpine Army Corps' Regiment "Savoia Cavalleria" (3rd) based in Meran in South Tyrol was disbanded and the name transferred to the Regiment "Lancieri di Firenze" (9th) based in Grosseto in Tuscany. On 5 September of the same year the 78th Infantry Regiment "Lupi di Toscana" was disbanded. During the late 1990s the brigade was earmarked to become Italy's only Air Assault brigade and therefore the 33rd Tank Regiment was transferred to the Armored Brigade "Ariete", the 121st Infantry Regiment "Macerata" to the Mechanized Brigade "Legnano", and the 21st Self-propelled Artillery Regiment "Trieste" to the Armored Brigade "Pinerolo". On 1 January 1999 the 7th Air Cavalry Regiment "Vega" and on 1 May 2000, the 5th Air Cavalry Regiment "Rigel" joined the brigade, which on the latter date changed its name to Airmobile Brigade "Friuli". On 27 June 2001 the Logistic Battalion "Friuli" became the 6th Transport Regiment and was transferred to the Logistic Projection Brigade. In 2003 the army's aviation left the cavalry arm and became a corps of its own and consequently the brigade's two air cavalry regiments changed their names to army aviation regiment. On 1 January 2005 the 6th Bersaglieri Regiment was transferred to the Mechanized Brigade "Aosta" on Sicily.

== Organization ==
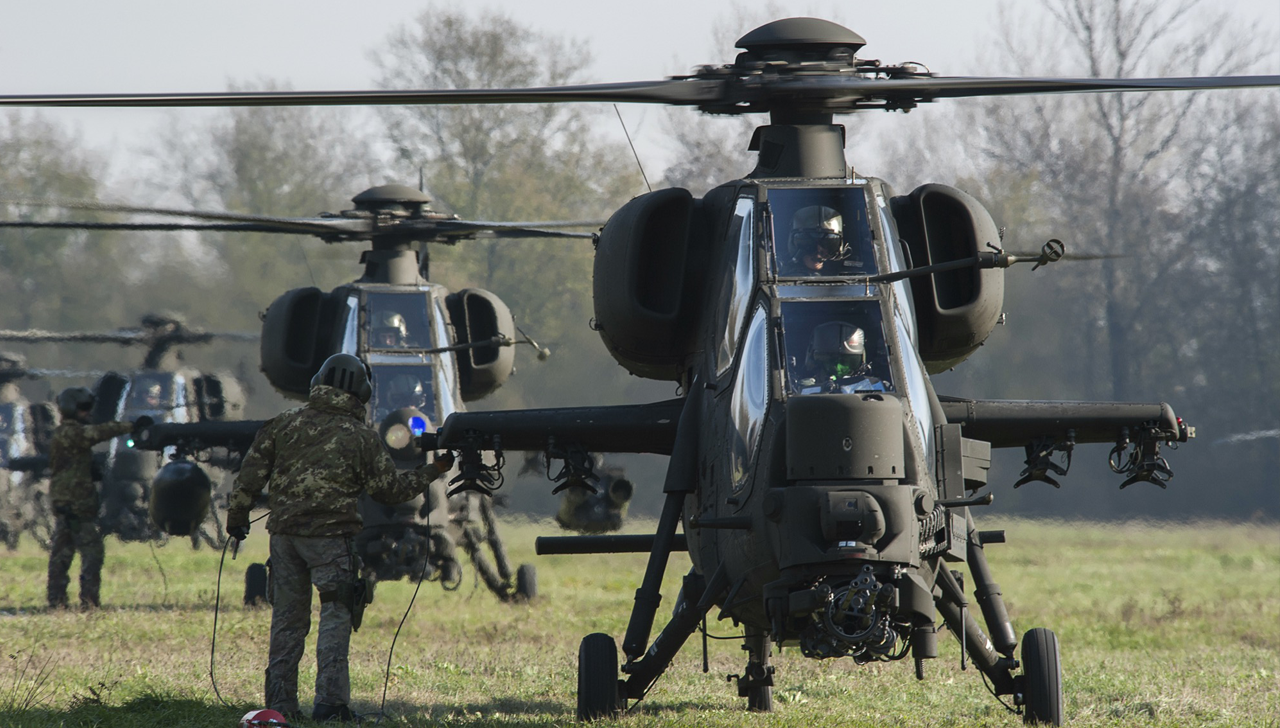
5th Army Aviation Regiment "Rigel" A129D Mangusta attack helicopters

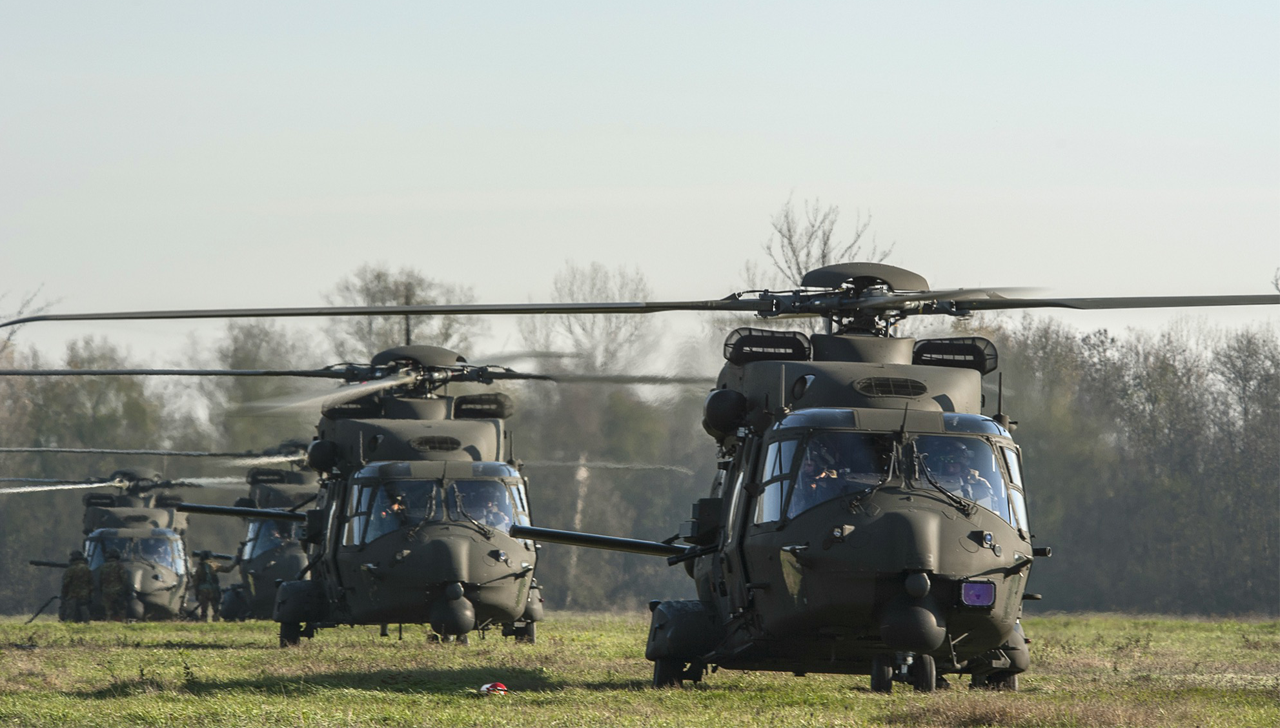
7th Army Aviation Regiment "Vega" NH90 transport helicopters

During the 2013 reform the Friuli ceded the Regiment "Savoia Cavalleria" (3rd) to the Paratroopers Brigade "Folgore". In turn the Friuli was destined to merge with the Cavalry Brigade "Pozzuolo del Friuli". In preparation for the merger the Friuli ceded its name on 16 July 2013 to the Division "Friuli" in Florence so that the name and traditions of the Cavalry Brigade "Pozzuolo del Friuli" could be passed to the former Airmobile Brigade "Friuli". However the merger was later canceled and on 1 July 2019 the Division "Friuli" changed its name to Division "Vittorio Veneto" and all traditions of the name Friuli returned to the brigade.

On 1 October 2023 the units of the Army Aviation Brigade were merged into the Friuli, which is organized since then as follows:

- Airmobile Brigade "Friuli", in Bologna (Emilia-Romagna)
  - 87th Command and Tactical Supports Unit "Friuli", in Bologna (Emilia-Romagna)
  - 1st Army Aviation Regiment "Antares", at Viterbo Airport (Lazio)
    - 11th Squadrons Group "Ercole", with CH-47F Chinook helicopters
    - 28th Squadrons Group "Tucano", at Viterbo Airport (Lazio)
      - Regional Transport and Liaison Planes Squadron, with P180 Avanti II planes
      - Light Transport and Liaison Planes Squadron, with Dornier 228-212 planes
      - UAV squadron, with RQ-7 Shadow 200 drones
    - 51st Squadrons Group "Leone", at Viterbo Airport (Lazio), with three NH90 transport helicopter squadrons
    - Support Squadrons Group
  - 2nd Army Aviation Regiment "Sirio", at Lamezia Terme Airport (Calabria)
    - Command and Logistic Support Squadron
    - 21st Detachment "Orsa Maggiore", at Elmas Airport (Sardinia), with AB 412HP helicopters
    - 30th Squadrons Group "Pegaso", at Lamezia Terme Airport, with AB 412HP and AW169D helicopters
    - Maintenance Squadron
  - 3rd Special Operations Helicopter Regiment "Aldebaran", at Viterbo Airport (Lazio)
    - 26th Squadrons Group "Giove", with one CH-47F Chinook, one AB AB 412HP, and one NH90 squadron
    - Support Squadrons Group
  - 4th Army Aviation Regiment "Altair", at Bolzano Airport (South Tyrol)
    - Command and Logistic Support Squadron
    - 34th Detachment "Toro", at Venaria Reale Airport (Piedmont), with AB 205A helicopters (being replaced by AW169D helicopters)
    - 54th Squadrons Group "Cefeo", at Bolzano Airport, with AB 205A helicopters (being replaced by AW169D helicopters)
    - Maintenance Squadron
  - 5th Army Aviation Regiment "Rigel", at Casarsa Airport (Friuli-Venezia Giulia)
    - 27th Squadrons Group "Mercurio", with two NH90 transport helicopter squadrons and one A109A EOA reconnaissance helicopter squadron
    - 49th Squadrons Group "Capricorno", with three A129D Mangusta Attack Helicopter squadrons
    - Support Squadrons Group "Lupo"
  - 7th Army Aviation Regiment "Vega", at Rimini Airport (Emilia-Romagna)
    - 25th Squadrons Group "Cigno", with three NH90 transport helicopter squadrons
    - 48th Squadrons Group "Pavone", with three A129D Mangusta attack helicopter squadrons
    - Support Squadrons Group
  - 66th Airmobile Infantry Regiment "Trieste", in Forlì (Emilia-Romagna), with VTLM Lince vehicles
  - Training Range "Foce Reno", in Casal Borsetti

== Equipment ==
The "Trieste" infantry regiment is equipped with Lince light multirole vehicles. The regiment's maneuver support company is equipped with 120 mm mortars and Spike anti-tank guided missiles. The "Rigel" army aviation regiment fields two A129D attack helicopter squadrons, two NH90 utility helicopter squadrons, and one A109A EOA reconnaissance helicopter squadron. The "Vega" army aviation regiment fields two A129D attack helicopter and three NH90 utility helicopter squadrons.

== Gorget patches ==
The personnel of the brigade's units wears the following gorget patches:

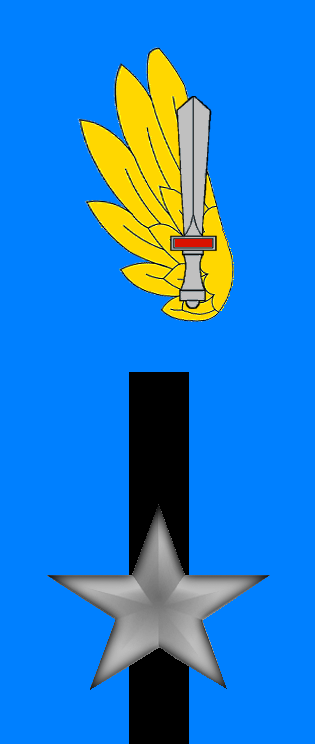
87th Command and Tactical Supports Unit "Friuli"

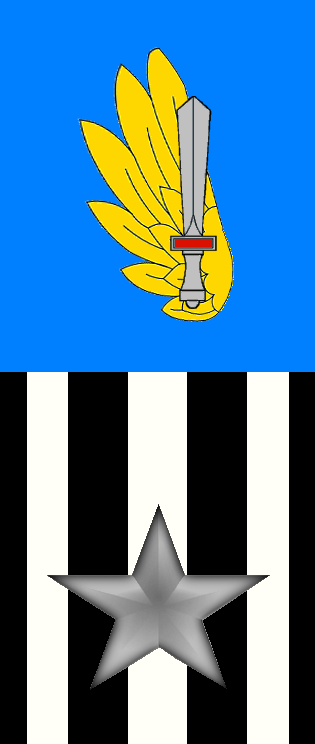
66th Airmobile Infantry Regiment "Trieste"

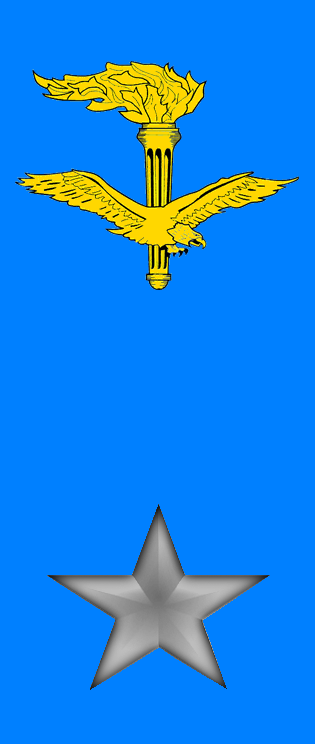
Army Aviation Regiments
