= 52nd Field Artillery Regiment "Torino" =

Active Italian Army self-propelled artillery unit

- 52° Reggimento Artiglieria Terrestre "Torino"
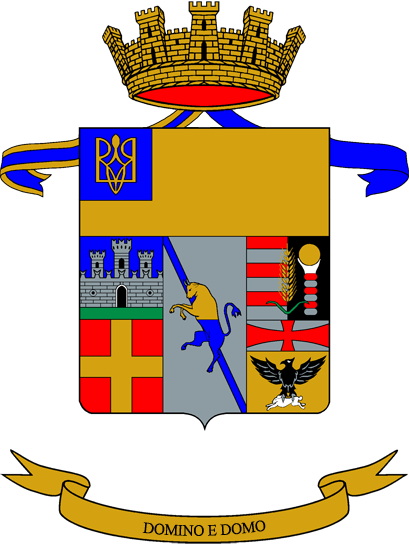
- Regimental coat of arms
- Active: June 1916 – Dec. 1918; 25 Feb. 1935 – 9 Dec. 1936; 1 Oct. 1938 – 13 Sept. 1943; 1 Jan. 1947 – today
- Country: Italy
- Branch: Italian Army
- Part of: Artillery Command
- Garrison/HQ: Persano
- Motto: "Domino e domo"
- Anniversaries: 15 June 1918 – Second Battle of the Piave River
- Decorations: 1× Gold Medal of Military Valor; 1× Bronze Medal of Military Valor

Insignia
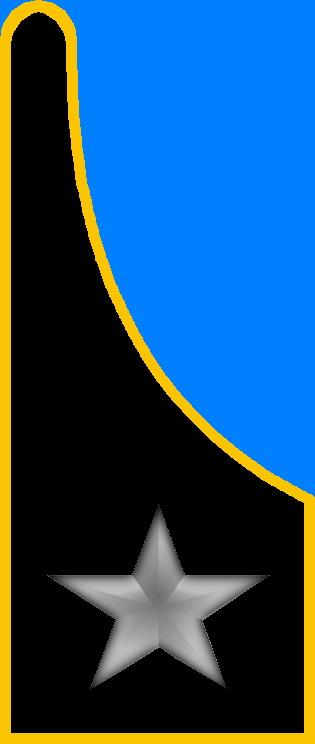
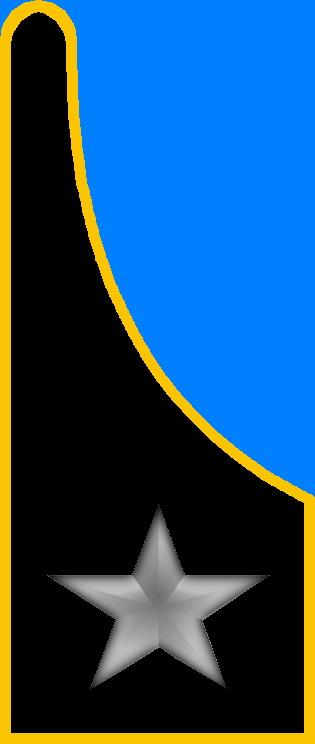
- Regimental gorget patches

The 52nd Field Artillery Regiment "Torino" (Italian: 52° Reggimento Artiglieria Terrestre "Torino") is an artillery regiment of the Italian Army trained for divisional artillery support. Since September 2020 the regiment is based together with the 8th Field Artillery Regiment "Pasubio" in Persano in Campania. The regiment is assigned to the army's Artillery Command.

Originally an artillery regiment of the Royal Italian Army, the regiment was formed during World War I and disbanded after the war. The regiment was reformed in 1935 during the Second Italo-Ethiopian War, but disbanded after the war in 1936. The regiment was reformed in 1938 and assigned in World War II to the 52nd Infantry Division "Torino", with which the regiment was deployed to the Eastern Front, where division and regiment were destroyed during Operation Little Saturn. After the division's survivors were repatriated to Italy the 159th Infantry Division "Veneto" was used to reform the 52nd Infantry Division "Torino" and its regiments. The division and its regiments were disbanded by invading German forces after the announcement of the Armistice of Cassibile on 8 September 1943.

The regiment was reformed in 1947 and assigned to the Infantry Division "Cremona". In 1957 the regiment was transferred to the III Army Corps. In 1975 the regiment was reduced to 52nd Field Artillery Group "Venaria" and assigned to the Mechanized Brigade "Brescia". After the end of the Cold War the group was assigned to the Mechanized Brigade "Legnano" and reorganized as a regiment. In 1995 the regiment took over the personnel, materiel, and base of the 131st Self-propelled Field Artillery Regiment "Centauro" and then joined the Mechanized Brigade "Centauro". In 2001 the regiment was assigned to the Cavalry Brigade "Pozzuolo del Friuli" and in 2005 to the Artillery Brigade. In 2016 the regiment left Vercelli in Lombardy and moved to Bracciano in Lazio and in 2019 from there to Persano in Campania. The regimental anniversary falls, as for all Italian Army artillery regiments, on June 15, the beginning of the Second Battle of the Piave River in 1918.

== History ==
=== World War I ===
In June 1916 the 52nd Field Artillery Regiment was formed in Naples by the depot of the 24th Field Artillery Regiment. The 24th Field Artillery Regiment formed the regimental command, the command of the I Group, and the 2nd Battery, while the regiment's remaining units were formed by the following regiments:

- 2nd Field Artillery Regiment: 6th Battery
- 8th Field Artillery Regiment: command of the II Group and 4th Battery
- 14th Field Artillery Regiment: 1st Battery and 5th Battery
- 27th Field Artillery Regiment: 3rd Battery

The new regiment consisted of a command and two groups, each of which fielded three batteries with 75/27 mod. 11 field guns. Most of the personnel for the regiment had been repatriated from units serving in Italian Libya.

During the war the regiment served on the Italian front, where it fought on Monte San Marco during the Sixth Battle of the Isonzo in August 1916. The rest of the year the regiment was deployed on Monte Sober, at Vrtojba, and again on Markov Hrib. In 1917 the regiment fought in the Tenth Battle of the Isonzo and was then deployed on the Banjšice Plateau, where the regiment fought in the Eleventh Battle of the Isonzo. After the Battle of Caporetto the regiment retreated with the army to the Piave, where the regiment was on the Montello during the First Battle of the Piave River. In June 1918 the regiment was again on the Montello for the Second Battle of the Piave River. During the decisive Battle of Vittorio Veneto the regiment was initially on the Montello before advancing to Fadalto and then Vittorio where the news of the Armistice of Villa Giusti reached the regiment.

After the war the regiment was disbanded in December 1918.

=== Interwar years ===
In February 1935 the 24th Artillery Regiment of the 29th Infantry Division "Peloritana" departed Messina for Eritrea for the Second Italo-Ethiopian War. On 25 February 1935 the depot of the 24th Artillery Regiment reformed the 52nd Artillery Regiment as replacement. The regiment was assigned to the 129th Infantry Division "Peloritana II" and consisted of a command, a command unit, the I Group with 100/17 mod. 14 howitzers, the II Group with 75/27 mod. 06 field guns, and the III Group with 65/17 mod. 13 mountain guns. In December 1936 the 24th Artillery Regiment returned to Messina and the 52nd Artillery Regiment was disbanded, while its groups entered the 24th Artillery Regiment.

On 1 October 1938 52nd Artillery Regiment "Torino" was reformed as a training formation in Civitavecchia. The regiment was assigned to the Central Military Schools Command – Infantry Division "Torino", which also included the 81st Infantry Regiment "Torino" and 82nd Infantry Regiment "Torino". The regiment consisted of a command, a command unit, the II Group with 75/27 mod. 11 field guns, the III Group with 75/13 mod. 15 mountain guns, and an anti-aircraft battery with 20/65 mod. 35 anti-aircraft guns. The II Group had been ceded by the 13th Artillery Regiment "Granatieri di Sardegna" and was detached to the Central Artillery School in Bracciano, while the III Group had been ceded by the 1st Artillery Regiment "Cacciatori delle Alpi". The two groups were renumbered I and II group and on 1 January 1939 the regiment formed the III Group with 100/17 mod. 14 howitzers. From 5 April to 15 July 1939 the regiment's anti-aircraft battery participated in the Italian invasion of Albania.

=== World War II ===
On 1 October 1940 the regiment was reorganized to bring its group in line with the army's standard numbering for artillery groups: therefore the III Group with 100/17 mod. 14 howitzers was renumbered as I Group, while the I Group with 75/27 mod. 11 field guns was renumbered III Group. On the same date the II Group with 75/13 mod. 15 mountain guns was transferred to the 22nd Artillery Regiment "Aosta" and a new II Group with 75/27 mod. 11 field guns was formed.

On 5 June 1940 the division split from the Central Military Schools Command and activated as 52nd Infantry Division "Torino" and on 10 June, the day Italy entered World War II, the regiment consisted of a command, a command unit, the I Group with 100/17 mod. 14 howitzers, the II and III groups with 75/27 mod. 11 field guns, the 352nd Anti-aircraft Battery with 20/65 mod. 35 anti-aircraft guns, and a depot. In April 1941 the division participated in the invasion of Yugoslavia, during which it moved along the Dalmatian coast to Split and Dubrovnik.

In July 1941 the division was assigned to the Italian Expeditionary Corps in Russia. In August of the same year the division assembled in Southern Ukraine and was assigned to the German 1st Panzer Group. On 1 September 1941 the regiment received the 361st Anti-aircraft Battery with 20/65 mod. 35 anti-aircraft guns. In late September, the division participated in the Battle of Petrikowka. In October, the division assaulted the city of Stalino (today Donetsk) and occupied the neighbouring towns of Horlivka and Yenakiieve.

In July 1942 the division was assigned to the newly arrived Italian 8th Army and received the 74th Anti-tank Battery with 75/39 anti-tank guns. On 16 December 1942 the Red Army commenced Operation Little Saturn, which destroyed most of the Italian 8th Army. The remnants of the Torino division were repatriated in April 1943.

For its conduct and service with the Italian Expeditionary Corps in Russia between August 1941 and May 1942 the regiment was awarded a Bronze Medal of Military Valor, which was affixed on the regiment's flag and is depicted on the regiment's coats of arms. For its conduct and sacrifice with the 8th Army between July 1942 and January 1943 the regiment was awarded Italy's highest military honor a Gold Medal of Military Valor, which was affixed on the regiment's flag and is depicted on the regiment's coats of arms.

The survivors of the division returned to Italy, where on 1 June 1943 the 159th Infantry Division "Veneto" was renamed 52nd Infantry Division "Torino", and on the same date the 159th Artillery Regiment "Veneto" was renamed 52nd Artillery Regiment "Torino". The regiment consisted of a command, a command unit, the I Group with 100/17 mod. 14 howitzers, the II Group with 75/27 mod. 11 field guns, the 7th Anti-aircraft Battery with 20/65 mod. 35 anti-aircraft guns, and the depot in Civitavecchia. On 8 September 1943 the Armistice of Cassibile was announced and the regiment, which was still in the process of being reformed, was disbanded by invading German forces on 13 September 1943.

=== Cold War ===
On 1 January 1947 the regiment was reformed in Acqui as 52nd Anti-tank Artillery Regiment. The regiment was assigned to the Infantry Division "Cremona" and initially consisted of a command, the I Group with QF 17-pounder anti-tank guns, which had been ceded by 7th Field Artillery Regiment, and the III Group with QF 6-pounder anti-tank guns. On 1 June of the same year the regiment formed its command unit. In March 1948 the regiment completed its organization by forming the II Group with QF 17-pounder anti-tank guns and the IV Group with QF 6-pounder anti-tank guns. On 1 August of the same year the regiment was renamed 52nd Anti-tank Field Artillery Regiment.

On 1 January 1951 the Infantry Division "Cremona" included the following artillery regiments:

- Infantry Division "Cremona", in Turin
  - 7th Field Artillery Regiment, in Turin
  - 17th Field Artillery Regiment, in Novara
  - 52nd Anti-tank Field Artillery Regiment, in Acqui
  - 1st Light Anti-aircraft Artillery Regiment, in Albenga

On 30 November 1951 the III and IV groups with QF 6-pounder anti-tank guns were disbanded and the next day the regiment was renamed 52nd Field Artillery Regiment. The regiment now consisted of the following units:

- 52nd Field Artillery Regiment, in Acqui
  - Command Unit
  - I Group with M101 105 mm towed howitzers
  - II Group with M101 105mm towed howitzers
  - III Light Anti-aircraft Group with 40/56 anti-aircraft autocannons
  - Anti-tank Sub-grouping, in Fossano
    - IV Group with QF 17-pounder anti-tank guns
    - V Group with QF 17-pounder anti-tank guns

On 3 June 1953 Anti-tank Sub-grouping was transferred to the 7th Field Artillery Regiment and on 1 July 1953 the regiment moved from Acqui to Alessandria, where it was reorganized. The regiment now consisted of a command, a command unit, and four groups with M59 155 mm field guns. However the IV Group existed only on paper and was never filled with men and materiel. On the same date the regiment was renamed 52nd Heavy Artillery Regiment and assigned to the I Territorial Military Command in Turin.

In May 1955 the regiment's II Group was equipped with M115 203 mm howitzers and in April 1956 this group was renumbered as IV Group. On 1 December 1956 the regiment formed a new II Group with M59 155 mm field guns and fielded now three groups with M59 155 mm field guns and one with M115 203 mm howitzers. On 1 July 1957 the regiment was assigned to the III Army Corps. In 1962 the regiment moved from Alessandria to Brescia. In June 1973 the regiment's III Group was placed in reserve status and on 1 October of the same year the regiment received the III Group of the disbanded 9th Heavy Artillery Regiment. Upon entering the regiment the new group was designated as V Group with M115 203 mm howitzers and placed in reserve status.

As part of the 1975 army reform the regiment's III and V groups were disbanded on 1 June, while the II Group was placed in reserve status on 20 September. On 30 September the 52nd Heavy Artillery Regiment was disbanded and the next day the regiment's II Group and IV Group joined the Horse Artillery Regiment, while the regiment's I Group was renamed 52nd Field Artillery Group "Venaria". To avoid confusion with the 82nd Mechanized Infantry Battalion "Torino" the group was named for Venaria, where on 1 January 1851 the first Field Artillery Regiment of the Royal Sardinian Army had been formed. The group was assigned to the Mechanized Brigade "Brescia" and consisted of a command, a command and services battery, and three batteries with towed M114 155 mm howitzers.

On 12 November 1976 the President of the Italian Republic Giovanni Leone assigned with decree 846 the flag and traditions of the 52nd Artillery Regiment "Torino" to the group. At the time the group fielded 485 men (37 officers, 58 non-commissioned officers, and 390 soldiers).

=== Recent times ===
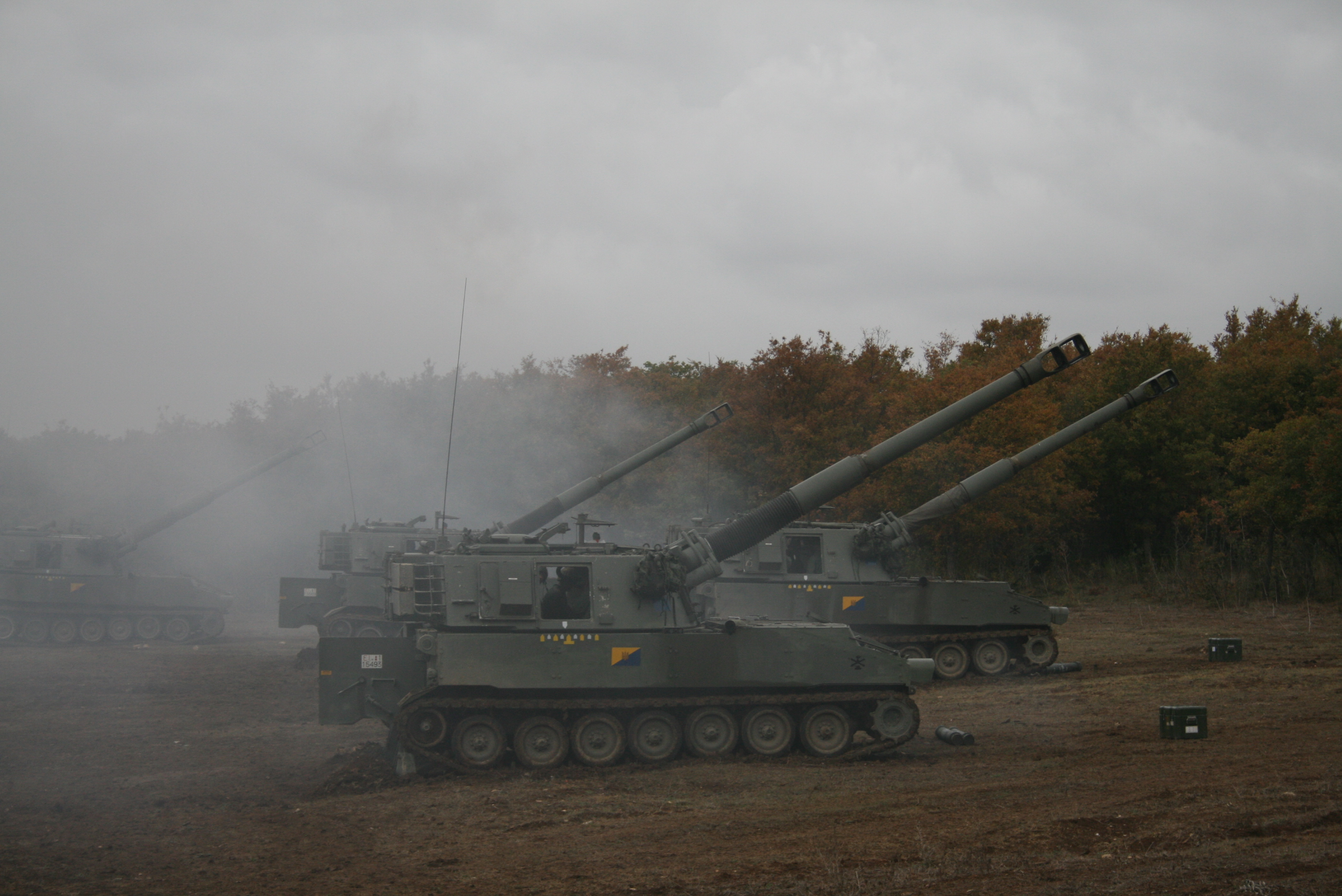
52nd Field Artillery Regiment "Torino" M109L self-propelled howitzers during an exercise

After the end of the Cold War the Mechanized Brigade "Brescia" was disbanded and consequently the group was transferred on 1 March 1991 to the Mechanized Brigade "Legnano". On 2 September of the same year the group was equipped with M109G self-propelled howitzers and reorganized provisionally as 52nd Self-propelled Field Artillery Regiment "Venaria". On 1 August 1992, the reorganization to regiment was approved and the regiment was renamed 52nd Self-propelled Field Artillery Regiment "Torino".

On 10 October 1995 the batteries of the 52nd Self-propelled Field Artillery Regiment "Torino" in Brescia were disbanded and the flag of the regiment was transferred to Vercelli, where it supplanted the flag of the 131st Self-propelled Field Artillery Regiment "Centauro", which departed Vercelli for Barletta. The 52nd Self-propelled Field Artillery Regiment "Torino" was now assigned to the Mechanized Brigade "Centauro" and equipped with M109L self-propelled howitzers.

On 1 October 2001 the regiment was transferred to the Cavalry Brigade "Pozzuolo del Friuli" and on 1 January 2005 to the army's Artillery Brigade. On 8 September 2016 the regiment moved from Vercelli to Bracciano in Lazio and in October 2019 from there to Persano in Campania.

== Organization ==
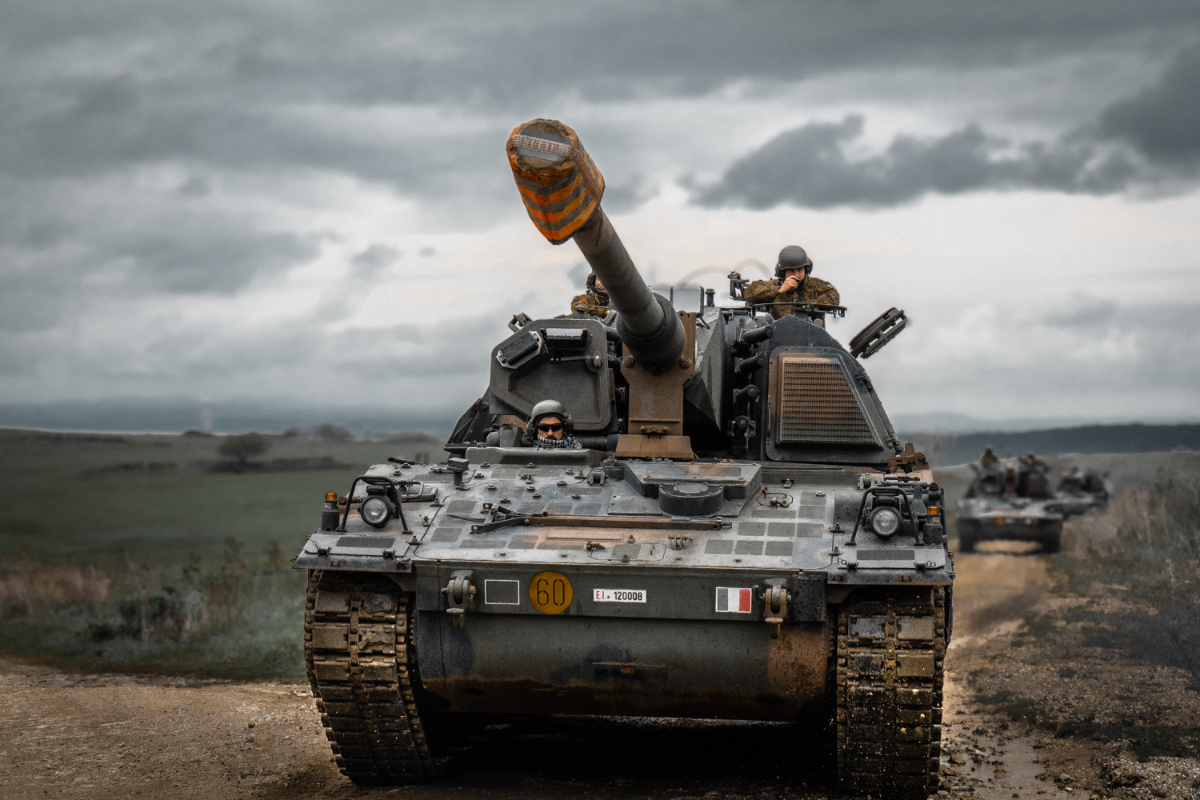
52nd Artillery Regiment "Torino" PzH 2000 self-propelled howitzer during

As of 2023 the 52nd Field Artillery Regiment "Torino" is organized as follows:

- 52nd Field Artillery Regiment "Torino", in Persano
  - Command and Logistic Support Battery "Pièmont"
  - Surveillance, Target Acquisition and Tactical Liaison Battery "Vercelli"
  - 1st Self-propelled Group "M.O. Nicola Russo"
    - 1st Howitzer Battery "Piave"
    - 2nd Howitzer Battery "Arbusow"
    - 3rd Howitzer Battery "Tscherkow"
    - Fire and Technical Support Battery "Divisione Torino"

The Command and Logistic Support Battery fields the following sections: C3 Section, Transport and Materiel Section, and Commissariat Section. The regiment is equipped with PzH 2000 self-propelled howitzers. The Surveillance, Target Acquisition and Tactical Liaison Battery is equipped with RQ-11B Raven unmanned aerial vehicles and ARTHUR counter-battery radars.
