= 12th Artillery Regiment "Savona" =

Inactive Italian Army artillery unit

- 12° Reggimento Artiglieria "Savona"
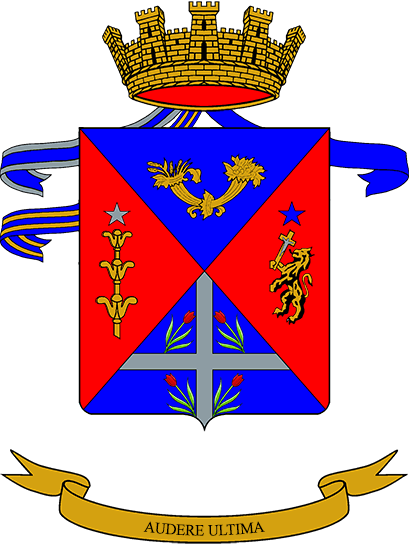
- Regimental coat of arms
- Active: 1 Nov. 1884 — 17 Jan. 1942; 1 Oct. 1975 — 31 March 1991
- Country: Italy
- Branch: Italian Army
- Part of: 32nd Armored Brigade "Mameli"
- Garrison/HQ: Vacile
- Motto: "Audere ultima"
- Anniversaries: 15 June 1913 - Second Battle of the Piave River
- Decorations: 1x Silver Medal of Military Valor; 1x Bronze Medal of Military Valor; 1x Bronze Medal of Army Valor

Insignia
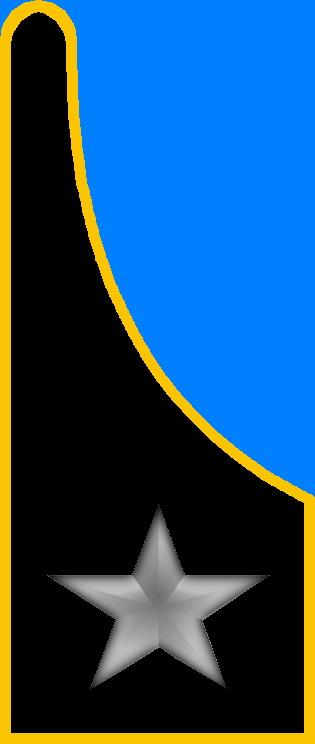
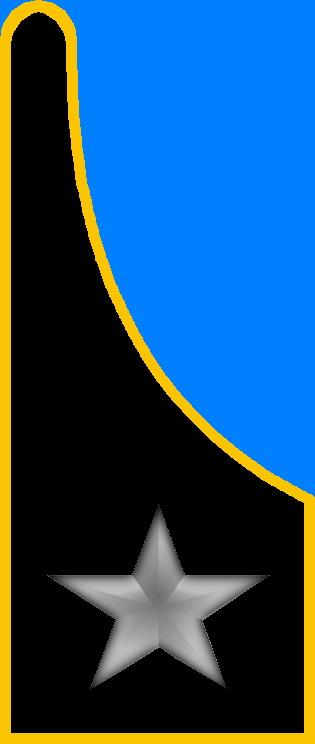
- Regimental gorget patches

The 12th Artillery Regiment "Savona" (Italian: 12° Reggimento Artiglieria "Savona") is an inactive field artillery regiment of the Italian Army, which was based in Vacile in Friuli-Venezia Giulia. The regiment was formed in 1884 by the Royal Italian Army. During World War I the regiment served on the Italian front. In 1935 the regiment was assigned to the 27th Infantry Division "Sila", with which the regiment participated in the Second Italo-Ethiopian War. In 1939 the regiment was transferred to the 55th Infantry Division "Savona", which was deployed to Libya at the outbreak of World War II. The division participated in the Western Desert campaign, during which the division and its regiments were overwhelmed by British forces during Operation Crusader and declared lost due to wartime events on 17 January 1942.

The unit was reformed in Vacile as 12th Self-propelled Field Artillery Group "Capua" and assigned to the 32nd Armored Brigade "Mameli". With the end of the Cold War the group was disbanded in 1991. The regimental anniversary falls, as for all Italian Army artillery regiments, on June 15, the beginning of the Second Battle of the Piave River in 1918.

This article is about the Royal Italian Army's 12th Field Artillery Regiment, which was a support unit assigned to a division-level command. This regiment is unrelated to the 12th Heavy Field Artillery Regiment, which was a support unit assigned to a corps-level command.

== History ==
On 1 November 1884 the 12th Field Artillery Regiment was formed in Capua with ten batteries, that had been ceded by the 1st Field Artillery Regiment, 2nd Field Artillery Regiment, 3rd Field Artillery Regiment, 7th Field Artillery Regiment and 10th Field Artillery Regiment. On 1 November 1888 the regiment ceded eight batteries and one train company to help form the 24th Field Artillery Regiment.

On 1 March 1895 the regiment ceded one field battery to the 5th Field Artillery Regiment, which on the same date ceded its six mountain batteries to the Mountain Artillery Regiment. In 1895-96 the regiment provided five officers and 75 troops to augment units deployed to Eritrea for the First Italo-Ethiopian War. During the Italo-Turkish War in 1911-12 the regiment mobilized one of its group commands and provided the personnel to form three batteries, which were deployed to Libya. The regiment also provided six officers and 217 troops for other deployed units. On 1 January 1915 the regiment ceded its II Group to help form the 34th Field Artillery Regiment.

=== World War I ===
At the outbreak of World War I the regiment was assigned to the X Army Corps as the corps' artillery regiment. At the time the regiment consisted of a command, three groups with a combined eight batteries equipped with 75/27 mod. 11 field guns, two reserve pack batteries with 70/15 mountain guns, and a depot. During the war the regiment's depot in Capua formed the command of the 49th Field Artillery Regiment. In 1915 the regiment fought initially at Sagrado, before being deployed to Monte Sei Busi and Doberdò for the Second Battle of the Isonzo. In the September of that year the regiment was deployed at Marcottini and on Monte San Michele. In 1916 the regiment fought in the Fifth Battle of the Isonzo at Oslavia and on the Sabotin. In June the regiment was transferred to the Asiago plateau to shore up Italian lines after the Battle of Asiago. Deployed in the Val Frenzela the regiment fought for control of Monte Fior and then Monte Zebio. In June 1917 the regiment was transferred to Monte Ortigara for the Battle of Mount Ortigara, while in August and September the regiment was on the Banjšice plateau for the Eleventh Battle of the Isonzo. During the Second Battle of the Piave River the regiment was in the Val Lagarina and afterwards deployed to help try conquer the Dosso Alto di Zures. During the decisive Battle of Vittorio Veneto the regiment pursued the fleeing Austro-Hungarian troops to Mori and then further up the Adige Valley to Trento. After the war the regiment dispatched its 9th Battery to Tripolitania to help quell local resistance against Italian rule.

In 1926 the regiment was assigned to the 27th Territorial Division of Catanzaro and consisted of a command, one group with 100/17 mod. 14 howitzers, two groups with 75/27 mod. 11 field guns, one group with mule-carried 75/13 mod. 15 mountain guns, and a depot. In January 1935 the 27th Territorial Division of Catanzaro was renamed 27th Infantry Division "Sila" and consequently the regiment was renamed 12th Artillery Regiment "Sila".

=== Second Italo-Ethiopian War ===
In late summer 1935 the division was sent to Eritrea for the Second Italo-Ethiopian War. The regiment deployed to East Africa with three groups with 75/13 mod. 15 mountain guns, one of which was transferred for the war from the 2nd Artillery Regiment "Metauro" and one from the 7th Artillery Regiment "Curtatone e Montanara". In October 1935 the division participated in the capture of Mek'ele. From 4 November 1935 the division was stationed in the Adigrat and in December 1936 it fought in the Ādī K’edawīt - Doghea Pass area. The division undertook reconnaissance raids towards Ziban Debrī Bota and Celecot. On 19 January 1936 the division broke through the Ethiopian defenses and captured several towns in Tembien Province. It did not participate in the nearby First Battle of Tembien and acted only in the final stages of Battle of Amba Aradam, capturing Āmba Ālagē on 26 February 1936. The regiment then fought in the Second Battle of Tembien, before the entire division moved in March 1936 to the Finarwa - Sek'ot'a region, where it remained until the end of war.

During the regiment's absence its depot in Capua formed a group with 100/17 mod. 14 howitzers for the 45th Artillery Regiment "Sila II", which replaced the regiment during its time in East Africa and incorporated the regiment's units left in Italy. When the 12th Artillery Regiment "Sila" returned in November 1936 from the war the 45th Artillery Regiment "Sila II" was disbanded. For its conduct and service in Ethiopia between August 1941 and May 1942 the regiment was awarded a Bronze Medal of Military Valor, which was affixed on the regiment's flag and is depicted on the regiment's coats of arms.

The regiment consisted now of a command, a command unit, the I Group with 100/17 mod. 14 howitzers, the II Group with 75/27 mod. 06 field guns, the IV Group with 75/13 mod. 15 mountain guns, an anti-aircraft battery with 20/65 mod. 35 anti-aircraft guns, and a depot. On 27 April 1939 the regiment was transferred to the newly formed 55th Infantry Division "Savona" and consequently changed its name to 12th Artillery Regiment "Savona". On 1 September of the same year the regiment formed the III Group with 75/27 mod. 06 field guns, while transferring its IV Group with 75/13 mod. 15 mountain guns to the 9th Artillery Regiment "Brennero". Ten days later the regiment was sent to Libya.

=== World War II ===
On 10 June 1940, the day Italy entered World War II, the regiment consisted of a command, command unit, the I Group with 100/17 mod. 14 howitzers, the II Group with 75/27 mod. 06 field guns, the III Group with 75/27 mod. 06 field guns, and the 13th Anti-aircraft Battery with 20/65 mod. 35 anti-aircraft guns. The regiment was assigned to the 55th Infantry Division "Savona", which also included the 15th Infantry Regiment "Ferrara" and 16th Infantry Regiment "Savona". Since September 1939 the division was garrisoned in ʽAziziya south-west of Tripoli.

In September 1940, during the Italian invasion of Egypt, and in December 1940, during the British Operation Compass counteroffensive, the "Savona" division remained at its bases. Due to the losses suffered by the Italian 10th Army during the British Operation Compass, the 12th Artillery Regiment "Savona" had to cede some of its units to help rebuild regiments, which had escaped the British advance. By March 1941 the regiment consisted of a command, command unit, one group with 100/17 mod. 14 howitzers, one group with 105/28 cannons, and a battery with 20/65 mod. 35 anti-aircraft guns. Only in June 1941, the "Savona" division joined the Western Desert campaign and moved East to participate in the Siege of Tobruk. In August 1941, the division took up positions along the road from Bardia to Sollum and the Halfaya Pass. In November 1941, the "Savona" division added defensive positions at Sīdī ‘Umar in the Libyan desert, where the division's troops clashed with British Eighth Army patrols.

On 18 November 1941, the British Eighth Army began Operation Crusader and attacked Axis positions from Bi’r Qirbah to Halfaya. On 22 and 23 November 1941, nearly 1,500 troops of the "Savona" division surrendered to British forces and two of the division's strong points were lost. The same day the "Savona" division counter-attacked and regained one of its two lost strong points. On 4 December 1941, as the Afrika Korps prepared to retreat to the Gazala Line, the "Savona" division was ordered to cover the Axis withdrawal by tying up British forces in the Bardia—Sollum—Halfaya sector for as long as possible. During the rest of the month the "Savona" division's supply situation deteriorated, with food, water and ammunition becoming scarce. On 2 January 1942, the garrison in Bardia surrendered and the remaining units of the division were now cut off from any possible retreat. Due to the lack of food and water and the impossibility to supply the "Savona" division by air the Italian General Staff allowed the remnants of the division in Sollum and Halfaya to surrender. On 17 January 1942, the 55th Infantry Division "Savona" and its regiments were declared lost due to wartime events.

For its conduct and sacrifice between 18 November 1941 and 17 January 1942 the regiment was awarded a Silver Medal of Military Valor, which was affixed on the regiment's flag and is depicted on the regiment's coats of arms.

=== Cold War ===
During the 1975 army reform the army disbanded the regimental level and newly independent battalions and groups were granted for the first time their own flags. On 1 October 1975 the 132nd Armored Artillery Regiment's I Self-propelled Field Artillery Group in Vacile was renamed 12th Self-propelled Field Artillery Group "Capua". To avoid confusion with the 16th Infantry Battalion "Savona" the group was named for the city of Capua, where the 12th Artillery Regiment "Savona" had been based from 1884 to 1940. The group was assigned to the 32nd Armored Brigade "Mameli" and consisted of a command, a command and services battery, and three batteries equipped with M109G 155 mm self-propelled howitzers. At the time the group fielded 477 men (38 officers, 62 non-commissioned officers, and 377 soldiers).

On 12 November 1976 the President of the Italian Republic Giovanni Leone assigned with decree 846 the flag and traditions of the 12th Artillery Regiment "Savona" to the group. For its conduct and work after the 1976 Friuli earthquake the group was awarded a Silver Medal of Army Valor, which was affixed to the group's flag and added to the group's coat of arms.

=== Recent times ===
With the end of the Cold War the Italian Army began to draw down its forces and on 31 March 1991 the 12th Self-propelled Field Artillery Group "Capua" was disbanded and on 8 May of the same year the flag of the 12th Artillery Regiment "Savona" was transferred to the Shrine of the Flags in the Vittoriano in Rome.
