= 159th Infantry Division "Veneto" =

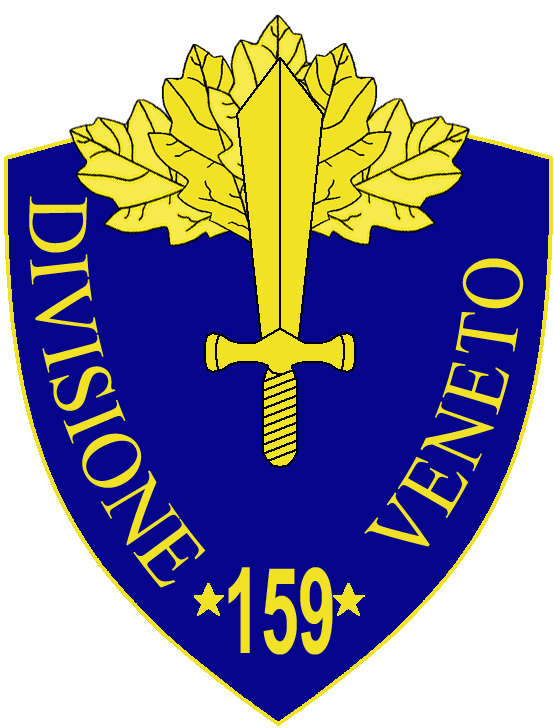
- 159th Infantry Division "Veneto" insignia
- Active: 1 March 1942–1 June 1943
- Country: Kingdom of Italy
- Branch: Royal Italian Army
- Type: Infantry
- Size: Division
- Garrison/HQ: Udine / Gorizia
- Engagements: World War II

Insignia
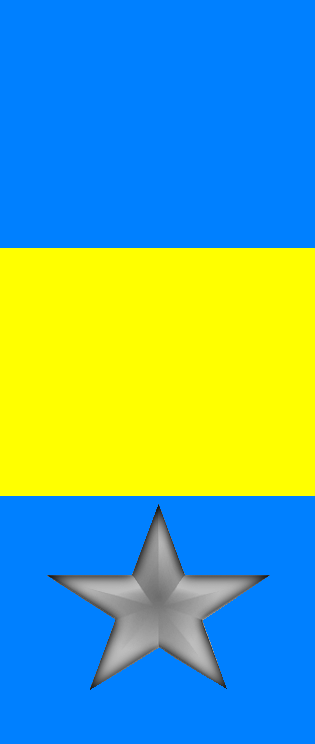
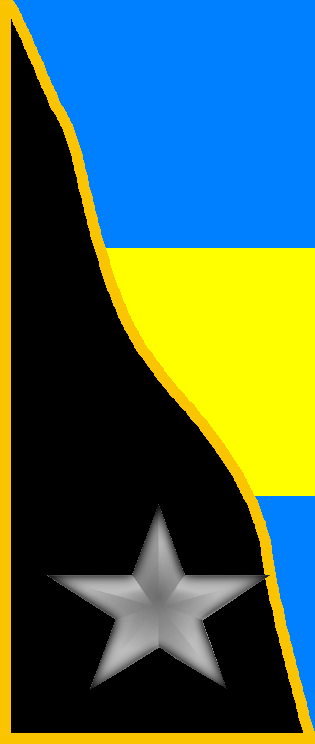
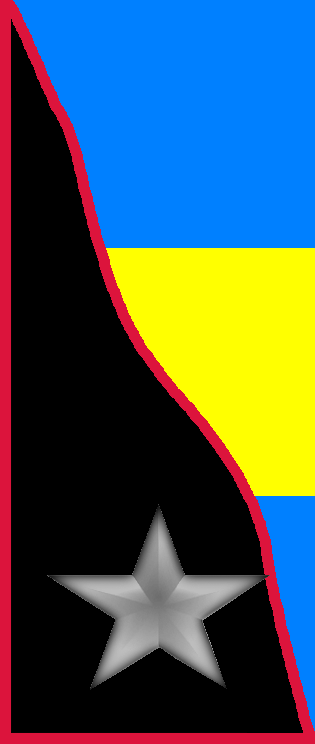
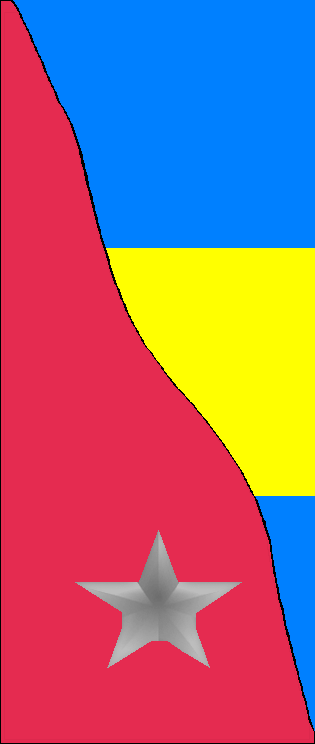
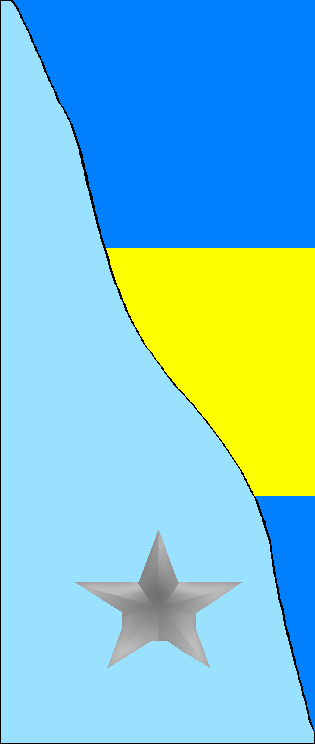
- Identification symbol: Veneto Division gorget patches

The 159th Infantry Division "Veneto" (Italian: 159ª Divisione di fanteria "Veneto") was an infantry division of the Royal Italian Army during World War II. The Veneto was formed on 1 March 1942 and named for the Veneto region. The Veneto was classified as an occupation infantry division, which meant, that the division's artillery regiment consisted of two artillery groups instead of the three artillery groups of line infantry divisions and that the divisional mortar battalion was replaced by a divisional machine gun battalion. On 1 June 1943 the Veneto was disbanded and its units used to reform the 52nd Infantry Division "Torino".

== History ==
=== World War I ===
The division's lineage begins with the Brigade "Veneto" raised on 12 March 1917 with the 255th and 256th infantry regiments. The brigade fought on the Italian front in World War I and together with its regiments was disbanded after the war in September 1919.

=== World War II ===
The 159th Infantry Division "Veneto" was activated in Udine on 1 March 1942 and consisted of the 255th and 256th infantry regiments, and the 159th Artillery Regiment. As a division raised during the war the Veneto did not have its own regimental depots and therefore its regiments were raised by the depots of the 13th Infantry Division "Re": the 255th Infantry Regiment "Veneto" was raised in Udine on 1 January 1942 by the 2nd Infantry Regiment "Re" and the 256th Infantry Regiment "Veneto" was raised in Tolmin on 1 January 1942 by the 1st Infantry Regiment "Re", while the 159th Artillery Regiment "Veneto" was raised by the 17th Artillery Regiment "Sforzesca" in Novara.

Initially the Veneto was based in Udine with its units in Cividale del Friuli, Tarcento, and San Pietro al Natisone in the upper Venezia Giulia region along the Italy-Yugoslav border. In May–June 1942 the division moved to Gorizia with its units in the Vipava-Postojna area. There the division operated against Yugoslav partisans. The division continued its anti-partisan activities until April 1943, when it was recalled to Udine, where it was disbanded on 1 June 1943 and its units used to reform the 52nd Infantry Division "Torino", which had been destroyed during winter 1942/43 on the Eastern Front.

The 255th Infantry Regiment "Veneto" became the 81st Infantry Regiment "Torino", the 256th Infantry Regiment "Veneto" became the 82nd Infantry Regiment "Torino", and the 159th Artillery Regiment "Veneto" became the 52nd Artillery Regiment "Torino".

== Organization ==
159th Infantry Division "Veneto" organization

- 159th Infantry Division "Veneto"
  - Headquarters
    - Command Company
    - 144th Carabinieri Section
    - 145th Carabinieri Section
    - 159th Field Post Office
    - 159th Infantry Division Command Transport Squad
  - 255th Infantry Regiment "Veneto"
    - Command Company
    - 3 × Fusilier battalions
    - Cannons Company (47/32 mod. 35 anti-tank guns)
    - Mortar Company (81mm mod. 35 mortars)
  - 256th Infantry Regiment "Veneto"
    - Command Company
    - 3 × Fusilier battalions
    - Cannons Company (47/32 mod. 35 anti-tank guns)
    - Mortar Company (81mm mod. 35 mortars)
  - 159th Artillery Regiment "Veneto"
    - Command Unit
    - I Group (75/13 mod. 15 mountain guns; transferred on 7 May 1942 to the 117th Artillery Regiment "Rovigo")
    - II Group (75/13 mod. 15 mountain guns; transferred on 7 May 1942 to the 117th Artillery Regiment "Rovigo")
    - I Group (100/17 mod. 14 howitzers; transferred in May 1942 from the 19th Artillery Regiment "Venezia")
    - II Group (75/27 mod. 11 field guns; formed in May 1942 by the depot of the 19th Artillery Regiment "Venezia")
    - 1 × Anti-aircraft battery (20/65 mod. 35 anti-aircraft guns)
    - Ammunition and Supply Unit
  - CLIX Machine Gun Battalion
  - CLIX Mixed Engineer Battalion
    - 159th Engineer company
    - 259th Telegraph and Radio Operators Company
  - 159th Anti-tank Company (47/32 mod. 35 anti-tank guns)
  - 159th Medical Section
    - 2 × Field hospitals
    - 1 × Surgical unit
  - 159th Supply Section
  - 1124th Transport Section

== Commanding officers ==
The division's commanding officers were:

- Generale di Divisione Luigi Krall (1 March 1942 - 1 June 1943)
