= 7th CBRN Defense Regiment "Cremona" =

Active Italian Army CBRN-defense unit

- 7° Reggimento Difesa CBRN "Cremona"
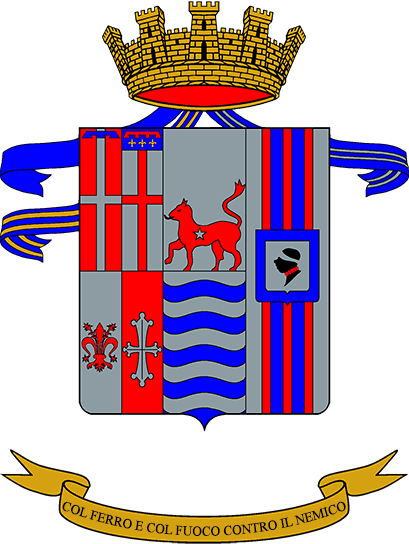
- Regimental coat of arms
- Active: 1 July 1860 – today
- Country: Italy
- Branch: Italian Army
- Part of: Artillery Command
- Garrison/HQ: Civitavecchia
- Motto: "Col ferro e col fuoco contro il nemico"
- Anniversaries: 15 June 1918 – Second Battle of the Piave River; 1 July 1923 – Military Chemical Service founding
- Decorations: 1× Bronze Medal of Military Valor; 1× War Cross of Military Valor; 1× Silver Medal of Army Valor; 1× Gold Cross of Army Merit

Insignia
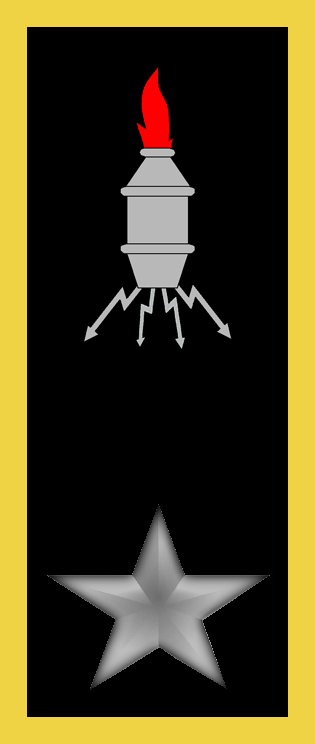
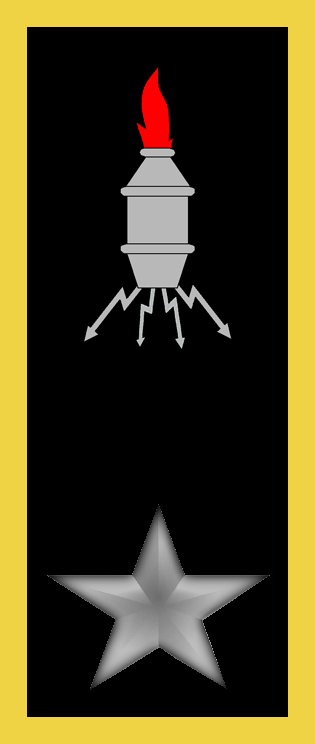
- Regimental gorget patches

The 7th CBRN Defense Regiment "Cremona" (Italian: 7° Reggimento Difesa CBRN "Cremona") is the Italian Army's CBRN defense unit. Today the regiment is based in Civitavecchia in Lazio and assigned to the Artillery Command. The regiment was formed in 1860 by the Royal Sardinian Army and its batteries participated in the same year in the Sardinian campaign in Central and Southern Italy. In 1861 the regiment joined the Royal Italian Army and in 1866 it fought in the Third Italian War of Independence. During World War I the regiment served on the Italian front. In 1939 the regiment was assigned to the 44th Infantry Division "Cremona", which was deployed in Corsica when the Armistice of Cassibile was announced on 8 September 1943. The division immediately went on the offensive against German forces trying to retreat through the island. The division then joined the Italian Co-belligerent Army and was reorganized as Combat Group "Cremona". Equipped with British weapons and materiel the group was assigned to the British V Corps and fought in the Allied 1945 spring offensive.

After the war the regiment was based in Turin and remained the artillery unit of the Infantry Division "Cremona". In 1975 the regiment was reduced to 7th Field Artillery Group "Adria" and assigned to the Motorized Brigade "Cremona". In 1992 the group was reorganized as a regiment and in 1995 the regiment took over the personnel, materiel, and base of the 13th Self-propelled Field Artillery Regiment "Granatieri di Sardegna" in Civitavecchia and joined the Mechanized Brigade "Granatieri di Sardegna". In 1997 the regiment left the Mechanized Brigade "Granatieri di Sardegna" and was reorganized as a CBRN defense unit. On 31 December 1998 the regiment was renamed 7th NBC Defense Regiment "Cremona" and designated as a multi-arms unit, and consequently exited the Italian Army's Artillery Arm. In 2019 the regiment was renamed 7th CBRN Defense Regiment "Cremona". The regimental anniversary falls, as for all Italian Army artillery regiments, on June 15, the beginning of the Second Battle of the Piave River in 1918. This article is about the Italian Army's 7th Field Artillery Regiment, which is a support unit assigned to a division-level command. This regiment is unrelated to the 7th Heavy Field Artillery Regiment, which was a support unit assigned to a corps-level command.

== History ==
=== Italian Wars of Independence ===
After the Second Italian War of Independence the Kingdom of Sardinia annexed on 22 March 1860 the Royal Provinces of Emilia and the Grand Duchy of Tuscany. Consequently, on 25 March 1860, the artillery units of the annexed territories were integrated into the Royal Sardinian Army: six field batteries, six fortress companies, and one workers company from the Tuscan Army, and nine field batteries, six fortress companies, and one workers company from the Emilian Army. The influx of artillery units and the growth of units in the runup to and during the war necessitated a new organization of the Piedmontese artillery, which at the time consisted of the Workers Regiment, the Fortress Artillery Regiment, the 1st Field Artillery Regiment, and the 2nd Field Artillery Regiment.

On 17 June 1860, which today is celebrated as the founding date of the Italian Army's Artillery Arm, four new regiments were ordered to be formed on 1 July 1860: the 3rd Regiment — Fortress Regiment, the 4th Regiment — Fortress Regiment, the 7th Regiment — Field Regiment, and the 8th Regiment — Field Regiment; while on the same day the Workers Regiment was to be renamed 1st Regiment — Workers Regiment, with the Fortress Artillery Regiment destined to become the 2nd Regiment — Fortress Regiment, and the 1st Field Artillery Regiment and 2nd Field Artillery Regiment, slated to be renamed 5th Regiment — Field Regiment and 6th Regiment — Field Regiment.

On 1 July 1860 the 7th Regiment — Field Regiment was formed in Modena and received nine field batteries from the former Piedmontese 1st Field Artillery Regiment, as well as one Tuscan field battery and two Emilian field batteries. Some of the Piedmontese batteries had participated in 1848 in the First Italian War of Independence and two batteries had been part of the Sardinian Expeditionary Corps, which was deployed to Crimea during the Crimean War in 1855–56. The Piedmontese batteries had also participated in 1859 in the Second Italian War of Independence.

In 1861 the regiment consisted of 16 field batteries. During the same year the regiment moved from Modena to Florence and in 1862 from Florence to Pisa. On 8 March September 1863 the regiment ceded four batteries to help form the 10th Artillery Regiment — Field Regiment. In 1866 the regiment participated with three companies in the Third Italian War of Independence. In September 1870 the regiment participated in the capture of Rome and on 13 November of the same year the regiment was renamed 7th Artillery Regiment and fielded now a mix of fortress companies and field batteries. On 1 January 1871 the regiment ceded two field batteries to help form the 11th Artillery Regiment. On 30 September 1873 the regiment ceded its remaining four fortress companies to help form the 11th Fortress Artillery Regiment. On 29 June 1882 the regiment was renamed 7th Field Artillery Regiment.

On 1 November 1884 the regiment ceded two batteries to help from the 12th Field Artillery Regiment and on 1 November 1888 the regiment ceded eight batteries and one train company to help form the 19th Field Artillery Regiment. In 1895–96 the regiment provided personnel and materiel to form the 7th Battery, which was deployed to Eritrea for the First Italo-Ethiopian War. The regiment also provided two officers and 178 troops to augment other units deployed for the war. During the Italo-Turkish War in 1911–12 the regiment's 6th Battery participated in May 1912 in the occupation of Rhodes in the Dodecanese and was then transferred to Libya. On 1 March 1912 the regiment ceded its II Group to help form the 32nd Field Artillery Regiment.

=== World War I ===
At the outbreak of World War I the regiment was assigned to the VIII Army Corps as the corps' artillery regiment. At the time the regiment consisted of a command, three groups with a combined eight batteries equipped with 75/27 mod. 11 field guns, and a depot. During the war the regiment's depot in Pisa helped form the 43rd Field Artillery Regiment and 54th Field Artillery Regiment. The depot also formed a group command and five batteries with 75/27 mod. 11 field guns. During the war the regiment was deployed initially on the Karst plateau, before being transferred to the Tolmin sector. In August 1916 the regiment was moved to the area of Gorizia for the Battle of Gorizia. In 1917 the regiment was deployed on Monte Vodice and the Banjšice plateau, but after the Battle of Caporetto the regiment was transferred to the Monte Grappa massif, where it fought on Monte Tomba and Monfenera during the Battle of Monte Grappa. In 1918 the regiment was in the Montello hill and in fall of the year at Vidor during the Battle of Vittorio Veneto.

In 1926 the regiment was assigned to the 20th Territorial Division of Livorno and consisted of a command, one group with 100/17 mod. 14 howitzers, two groups with 75/27 mod. 06 field guns, one group with mule-carried 75/13 mod. 15 mountain guns, and a depot. On 1 October 1934 the regiment's III Group was disbanded and replaced by a group with 75/27 mod. 06 field guns of the Complement Officer Cadets School in Lucca. In January 1935 the 20th Territorial Division of Livorno was renamed 20th Infantry Division "Curtatone e Montanara" and consequently the regiment was renamed 7th Artillery Regiment "Curtatone e Montanara".

In October 1935 the regiment transferred its IV with 75/13 mod. 15 mountain guns to the 12th Artillery Regiment "Sila" for the Second Italo-Ethiopian War. The regiment also formed the III Group with 65/17 mod. 13 mountain guns and the XXXIII Train Unit for the war. The III Group distinguished itself in the Battle of Shire, for which the group was awarded a War Cross of Military Valor, which was affixed to the regiment's flag and is depicted on the regiment's coat of arms.

In May 1939 the division was renamed 20th Infantry Division "Cremona" and consequently the regiment was renamed 7th Artillery Regiment "Cremona". On 4 September 1939 the regiment ceded its III Group with 75/13 mod. 15 mountain guns to help reform the 35th Artillery Regiment "Friuli", which had been formed so that on 15 September 1939 the 20th Infantry Division "Cremona" could be split into the 20th Infantry Division "Friuli" and the 44th Infantry Division "Cremona". The 7th Artillery Regiment "Cremona", together with the 21st Infantry Regiment "Cremona" and 22nd Infantry Regiment "Cremona", was transferred to the 44th Infantry Division "Cremona".

=== World War II ===
On 10 June 1940, the day Italy entered World War II, the regiment consisted of a command, command unit, one group with 100/17 mod. 14 howitzers, two groups with 75/18 mod. 35 howitzers, and an anti-aircraft battery with 20/65 mod. 35 anti-aircraft guns. The regiment was assigned to the 44th Infantry Division "Cremona", which also included the 21st Infantry Regiment "Cremona" and 22nd Infantry Regiment "Cremona". On 25 December 1940 the regiment transferred one of its groups with 75/18 mod. 35 howitzers to the 58th Artillery Regiment "Legnano" and received a group with 75/27 mod. 06 field guns in return. In February 1941 the division was ordered to move to northern Sardinia for coastal defense duties. On 2 August 1941 the regiment transferred its group with 75/27 mod. 06 field guns to the 40th Artillery Regiment "Calabria" and received a group with 75/13 mod. 15 mountain guns in return. On 12 January 1942 the regiment was reorganized and now consisted of a command, command unit, two groups with 100/17 mod. 14 howitzers, one group with 75/13 mod. 15 mountain guns, and an anti-aircraft battery with 20/65 mod. 35 anti-aircraft guns. On 15 February of the same year the regiment's depot in Pisa formed the 80th Artillery Regiment "La Spezia" for the 80th Infantry Division "La Spezia".

In November 1942 Germany and Italy occupied Vichy France and the 44th Infantry Division "Cremona" was ferried from Sardinia to southern Corsica, while the Cremona's sister division the 20th Infantry Division "Friuli" was ferried from Livorno to northern Corsica. The two divisions, together with the 225th Coastal Division and 226th Coastal Division, were tasked with the occupation and defense of the island. After the Armistice of Cassibile was announced on 8 September 1943 the two infantry divisions and French partisans immediately went on the offensive against the German Sturmbrigade Reichführer-SS and 90th Panzergrenadier Division, which had crossed over from Sardinia and retreated through Corsica towards the harbor of Bastia in the island's north. After the Germans escaped from the island the Italian units were transferred to Sardinia.

The division joined the Italian Co-belligerent Army and on 25 September 1944 it was reorganized in Altavilla Irpina as Combat Group "Cremona", which was equipped with British weapons and materiel. The regiment was now organized as follows:

- 7th Artillery Regiment "Cremona"
  - Command Unit
  - I Group with QF 25-pounder field guns
  - II Group with QF 25-pounder field guns
  - III Group with QF 25-pounder field guns
  - IV Group with QF 25-pounder field guns
  - V Group with QF 17-pounder anti-tank guns
  - VI Group with 40/56 anti-aircraft autocannons
  - 2 × mobile workshops

The combat group entered the front on 12 January 1945 as part of British V Corps and participated in the liberation of Ravenna, Alfonsine, and Torre Primaro. When allied forces achieved a major breakthrough during the 1945 spring offensive the combat group advanced towards Venice and liberated Adria, Cavarzere, Chioggia, Mestre, and finally Venice on 30 April 1945. For its conduct and service on Corsica in September 1943 and for its participation in the liberation of the Ravenna and Venice in April 1945 the regiment was awarded a Bronze Medal of Military Valor, which was affixed to the regiment's flag and is depicted on the regiment's coat of arms.

=== Cold War ===
After the war the regiment was based in Turin. On 15 October 1945 the Combat Group "Cremona" was reorganized as Infantry Division "Cremona". On 1 January 1947 the regiment was renamed 7th Field Artillery Regiment and ceded its III and IV groups with QF 25-pounder field guns to help reform the 17th Field Artillery Regiment and its V Group with QF 17-pounder anti-tank guns to help reform the 52nd Anti-tank Artillery Regiment. On 1 July 1947 the regiment ceded its VI Anti-aircraft Group and newly formed VI/bis Anti-aircraft Group, both equipped with 40/56 autocannons, to help reform the 1st Light Anti-aircraft Artillery Regiment. Afterwards the regiment consisted of a command, a command unit, and the I and II groups with QF 25-pounder field guns, and reformed in course of the year the III Group with QF 25-pounder field guns. On 1 January 1951 the Infantry Division "Cremona" included the following artillery regiments:

- Infantry Division "Cremona", in Turin
  - 7th Field Artillery Regiment, in Turin
  - 17th Field Artillery Regiment, in Novara
  - 52nd Anti-tank Field Artillery Regiment, in Acqui
  - 1st Light Anti-aircraft Artillery Regiment, in Albenga

On 1 July 1951 the 1st Light Anti-aircraft Artillery Regiment was reorganized as 1st Heavy Anti-aircraft Artillery Regiment and transferred its I Light Anti-aircraft Group with 40/56 autocannons to the 7th Field Artillery Regiment, which renumbered the new group as IV Group. The same year regiment disbanded its III Group with QF 25-pounder field guns. In 1952–53 the regiment's groups replaced their British materiel with American materiel. On 3 June 1953 the regiment received the Anti-tank Sub-grouping in Fossano from the 52nd Field Artillery Regiment. Afterwards the 7th Field Artillery Regiment consisted of the following units:

- 7th Field Artillery Regiment, in Turin
  - Command Unit
  - I Group with M101 105 mm howitzers
  - II Group with M101 105 mm howitzers
  - III Group with M101 105 mm howitzers
  - IV Group with M114 155 mm howitzers
  - V Light Anti-aircraft Group with 40/56 anti-aircraft autocannons
  - Anti-tank Sub-grouping, in Fossano
    - VI Anti-tank Group with QF 17-pounder anti-tank guns (from the 18th Anti-tank Field Artillery Regiment)
    - VII Anti-tank Group with QF 17-pounder anti-tank guns (from the 18th Anti-tank Field Artillery Regiment)

In 1954 the VI and VII anti-tank groups were renumbered CIX and CX anti-tank groups. On 21 June 1955 the regiment formed a Light Aircraft Section with L-21B artillery observation planes, which on 1 March 1957 was expanded to Light Aircraft Unit. In 1956 the Infantry Division "Cremona" transferred its Artillery Specialists Unit to the regiment, which expanded the unit in 1958 to Artillery Specialists Battery. On 30 April 1957 the regiment transferred the Anti-tank Sub-grouping, whose two anti-tank groups had been equipped by then with M36 tank destroyers, to the 35th Army Corps Self-propelled Artillery Regiment. On 25 February 1963 the Light Aircraft Unit was merged into the divisional Light Aircraft Unit. On 31 October 1965 the V Light Anti-aircraft Group was placed in reserve status.

During the 1975 army reform the army disbanded the regimental level and newly independent battalions and groups were granted for the first time their own flags. On 1 June 1975 the regiment's I Group was disbanded, followed on 10 September by the II and III groups. On 29 October 1975 the 7th Field Artillery Regiment, the Artillery Specialists Battery, and the reserve V Light Anti-aircraft Artillery Group were disbanded. The next day the regiment's IV Group in Turin was renamed 7th Field Artillery Group "Adria". To avoid confusion with the support units of the Motorized Brigade "Cremona" the group was named for the city of Adria, which the 7th Artillery Regiment "Cremona" had liberated in April 1945. The group was assigned to the Motorized Brigade "Cremona" and consisted of a command, a command and services battery, and three batteries with M114 155 mm howitzers.

On 12 November 1976 the President of the Italian Republic Giovanni Leone assigned with decree 846 the flag and traditions of the 7th Field Artillery Regiment "Cremona" to the group. At the time the group fielded 485 men (37 officers, 58 non-commissioned officers, and 390 soldiers).

=== Recent times ===
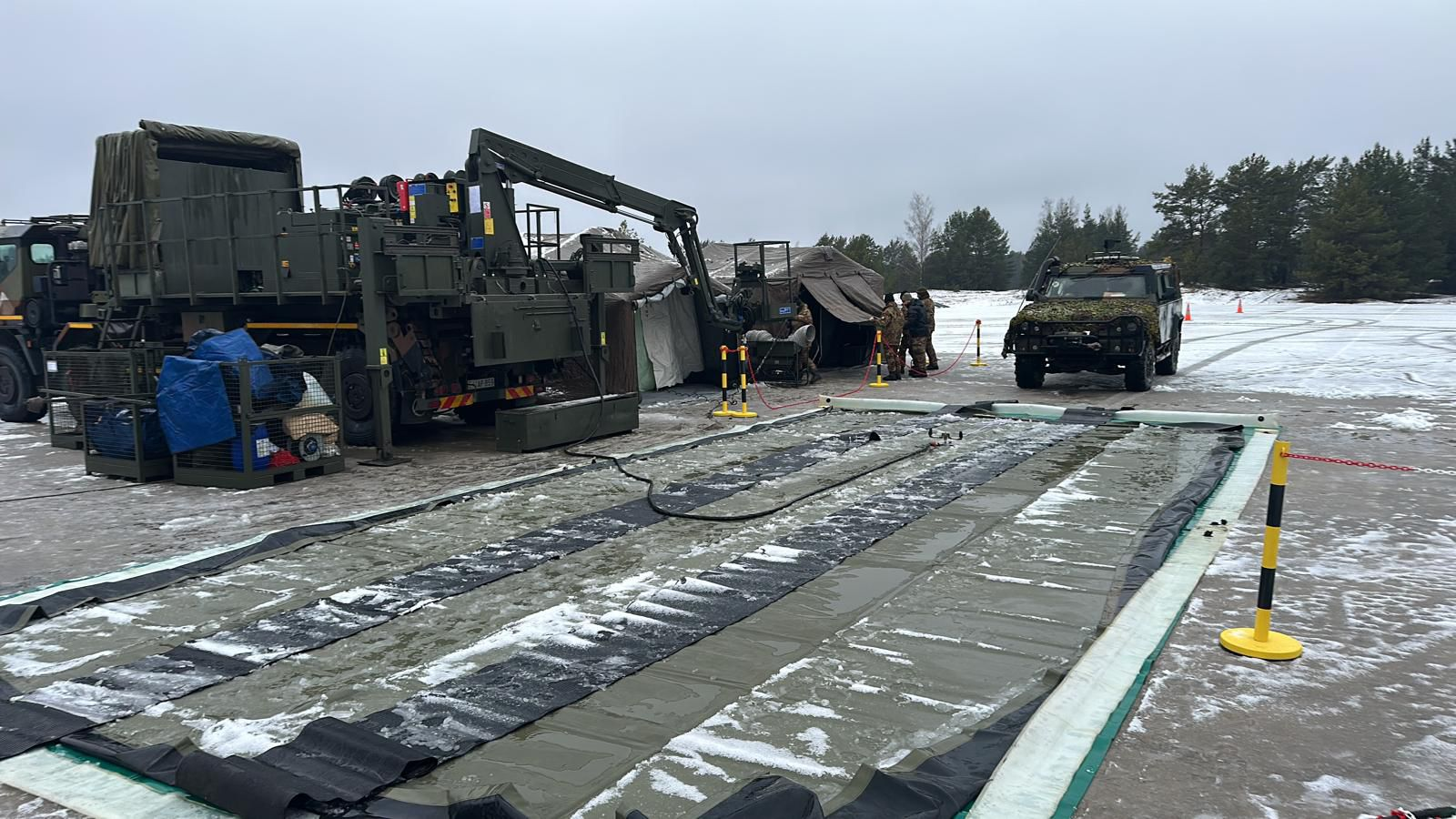
7th CBRN Defense Regiment "Cremona" decontamination station during the NATO exercise War Horse Forge in Latvia in January 2025

On 11 September 1992 the 7th Field Artillery Group "Adria" lost its autonomy and the next day entered the reformed 7th Heavy Field Artillery Regiment "Cremona". The regiment was assigned to the Mechanized Brigade "Cremona". On 20 September 1995 the batteries of the 7th Heavy Field Artillery Regiment "Cremona" in Turin were disbanded and the flag of the regiment was transferred to Civitavecchia, where on the same day the flag of the 13th Self-propelled Field Artillery Regiment "Granatieri di Sardegna" was prepared for the transfer to Shrine of the Flags in the Vittoriano in Rome. The next day, on 21 September 1995, the personnel and materiel of the 13th Self-propelled Field Artillery Regiment "Granatieri di Sardegna" were used to form the 7th Self-propelled Field Artillery Regiment "Cremona", which was assigned to the Mechanized Brigade "Granatieri di Sardegna".

On 15 May 1996 the 33rd Self-propelled Field Artillery Regiment "Acqui" joined the Mechanized Brigade "Granatieri di Sardegna", which now fielded two artillery regiments. Consequently on 25 July 1996 the 7th Self-propelled Field Artillery Regiment "Cremona" was transferred to the NBC-defense and Artillery Command of the Central Military Region and began its conversion to a CBRN defense unit. On 1 December 1997 the regiment was transferred to the army's Artillery Grouping and on 31 December 1998 the regiment's conversion was completed and the regiment was renamed 7th NBC Defense Regiment "Cremona". In 2019 the regiment was renamed 7th CBRN Defense Regiment "Cremona". For its conduct and work during the COVID-19 pandemic the regiment was awarded a Silver Medal of Army Valor, which was affixed to the regiment's flag and is depicted on the regiment's coat of arms.

== Organization ==
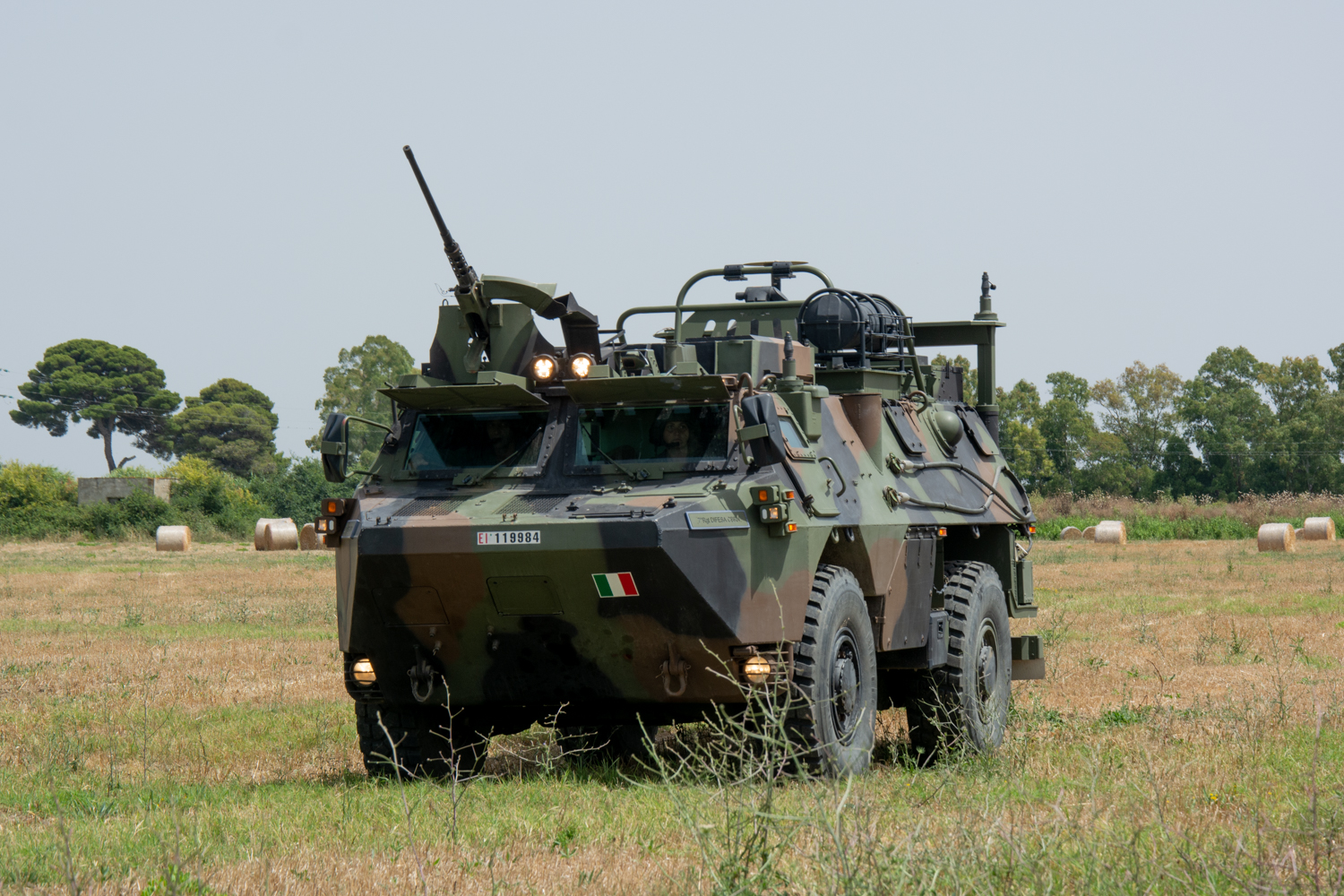
7th CBRN Defense Regiment "Cremona" VBR NBC Plus vehicle during an exercise

As of 2023 the 7th CBRN Defense Regiment "Cremona" is organized as follows:

- 7th CBRN Defense Regiment "Cremona", in Civitavecchia
  - Command and Logistic Support Company
  - 1st CBRN Defense Battalion
    - 1st CBRN Defense Company
    - 2nd CBRN Defense Company
    - 3rd CBRN Defense Company
    - 4th CBRN Defense Company
    - 5th CBRN Defense Company

The regiment is equipped with VBR NBC Plus armoured personnel carriers in the CBRN configuration.
