= 13th Artillery Regiment "Granatieri di Sardegna" =

Inactive Italian Army artillery unit

- 13° Reggimento Artiglieria "Granatieri di Sardegna"
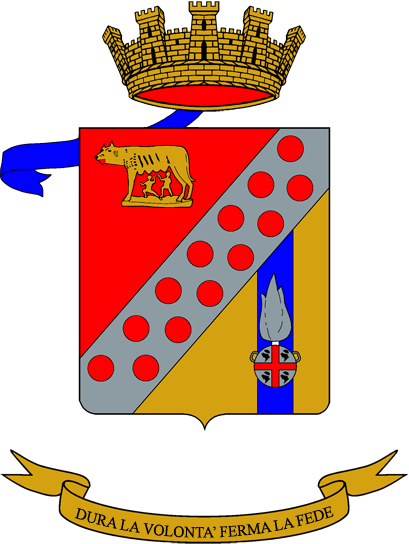
- Regimental coat of arms
- Active: 1 Nov. 1888 — 12 Sept. 1943; 1 April 1947 — 20 Sept. 1995
- Country: Italy
- Branch: Italian Army
- Part of: Mechanized Brigade "Granatieri di Sardegna"
- Garrison/HQ: Civitavecchia
- Motto: "Dura la volontà ferma la fede"
- Anniversaries: 15 June 1918 - Second Battle of the Piave River
- Decorations: 1x Bronze Medal of Military Valor

Insignia
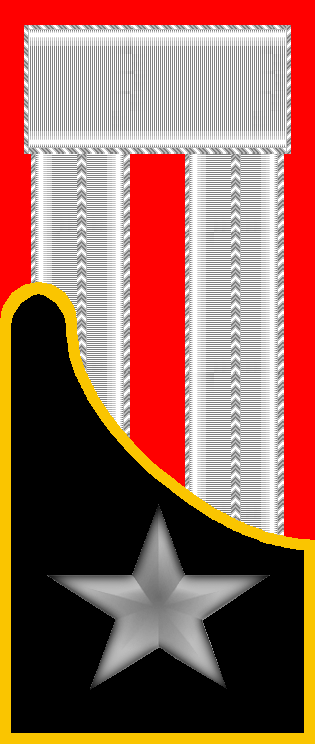
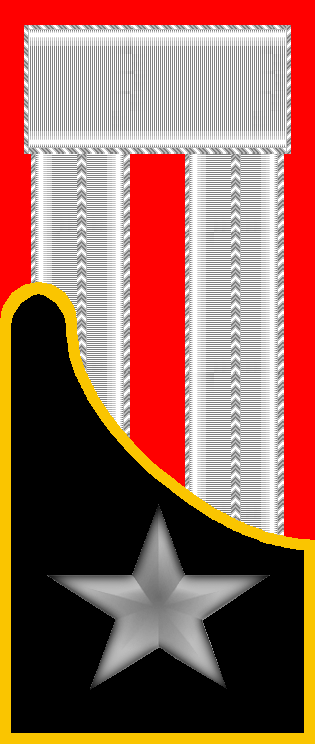
- Regimental gorget patches

The 13th Artillery Regiment "Granatieri di Sardegna" (Italian: 13° Reggimento Artiglieria "Granatieri di Sardegna") is an inactive field artillery regiment of the Italian Army, which was based in Civitavecchia in Lazio. Originally an artillery regiment of the Royal Italian Army, the regiment was formed in 1888 and served in World War I on the Italian front. In 1935 the regiment was assigned to the 21st Infantry Division "Granatieri di Sardegna", with which the regiment served in World War II. After the Armistice of Cassibile was announced on 8 September 1943, the division and its regiments defended Rome against invading German forces until 10 September. However the flight of the Italian King Victor Emmanuel III made further resistance senseless and after handing their weapons over to civilian resistance fighters the division surrendered to the Germans, which disbanded the division and its units on 12 September.

The regiment was reformed in 1947 and one year later assigned to the Infantry Division "Granatieri di Sardegna". In 1975 the regiment was reduced to 13th Field Artillery Group "Magliana". In 1992 group was equipped with M109G self-propelled howitzers and renamed 13th Self-propelled Field Artillery Group "Magliana". By the end of the same year the group was reorganized as 13th Self-propelled Field Artillery Regiment "Granatieri di Sardegna". The regiment was disbanded in 1995. The regimental anniversary falls, as for all Italian Army artillery regiments, on June 15, the beginning of the Second Battle of the Piave River in 1918.

== History ==
On 1 November 1888 the 13th Field Artillery Regiment was formed in Rome. The new regiment consisted of eight batteries and one train company ceded by the 1st Field Artillery Regiment. During the First Italian War of Independence the ceded batteries had fought in 1848 in the Battle of Goito and in 1849 in the Battle of Novara. During the Second Italian War of Independence in 1859 the batteries fought in the Battle of Solferino, while during the Piedmontese invasion of Central and Southern Italy they participated in the Siege of Gaeta in 1860–61. In 1866 the batteries participated in the Third Italian War of Independence and in 1870 in the capture of Rome.

During the Italo-Turkish War in 1911-12 the regiment provided two batteries, one train company, and three officers and 116 troops for other deployed units. On 1 January 1915 the regiment ceded its III Group to help form the 33rd Field Artillery Regiment.

=== World War I ===
At the outbreak of World War I the regiment was assigned, together with the Brigade "Reggio" and Brigade "Torino", to the 17th Division. At the time the regiment consisted of a command, three groups with a combined eight batteries equipped with 75/27 mod. 11 field guns, a reserve pack battery with 70/15 mountain guns, and a depot. During the war the regiment's depot formed the command of the 51st Field Artillery Regiment, the 3rd Mixed Artillery Grouping, the anti-aircraft artillery groupings 1st to 7th, and some mountain batteries and siege batteries. During the war the regiment fought on the Lagazuoi, Sass de Stria, Col di Lana, and Monte Piana in 1915, on the Col di Lana and in Val Travignolo in 1916. The following year the regiment fought in the sector of the Kreuzberg Pass and in the Val Costeana, before falling back to the Monte Grappa after the disastrous Battle of Caporetto. In 1918 the regiment fought in the Battles of Monte Grappa, until the Battle of Vittorio Veneto, during which the regiment fought initially at Spresiano, before crossing the Piave and advancing to Conegliano and Livenza.

In 1926 the regiment was assigned to the 21st Territorial Division of Rome and consisted of a command, one group with 100/17 mod. 14 howitzers, two groups with 75/27 mod. 11 field guns, one group with mule-carried 75/13 mod. 15 mountain guns, and a depot. As the artillery regiment based in the capital of Italy the regiment became on 11 November 1926 the custodian of the flag of the Artillery Arm. On 30 September 1934 the regiment's III Group with 75/27 mod. 11 field guns was disbanded and replaced by the existing group with 75/27 mod. 11 field guns of the Central Artillery School in Civitavecchia. On 10 April 1935 the regiment's IV Group with 75/13 mod. 15 mountain guns was assigned to the 18th Artillery Regiment "Gran Sasso" for the duration of the Second Italo-Ethiopian War.

In January 1935 the 21st Territorial Division of Rome was renamed 21st Infantry Division "Granatieri di Sardegna" and consequently the regiment was renamed 13th Artillery Regiment "Granatieri di Sardegna". On 12 January 1936 the regiment transferred the flag of the Artillery Arm to the 8th Army Corps Artillery Regiment. On 1 October 1938 the regiment ceded its III Group with 75/27 mod. 11, which was based at the Central Artillery School, to help reform the 52nd Artillery Regiment "Torino".

=== World War II ===
On 10 June 1940, the day Italy entered World War II, the regiment consisted of a command, command unit, one group with 100/17 mod. 14 howitzers, one group with 75/27 mod. 11 field guns, one group with 75/13 mod. 15 mountain guns, and an anti-aircraft battery with 20/65 mod. 35 anti-aircraft guns. The regiment was assigned to the 21st Infantry Division "Granatieri di Sardegna", which also included the 1st Regiment "Granatieri di Sardegna" and 2nd Regiment "Granatieri di Sardegna". In December 1940 the regiment transferred its group with 75/13 mod. 15 mountain guns to the 30th Artillery Regiment "Lupi di Toscana" of the 7th Infantry Division "Lupi di Toscana", and received from the 30th Artillery Regiment "Lupi di Toscana" a group with 75/27 mod. 11 field guns. In 1941 the regiment's depot formed a second group with 100/17 mod. 14 howitzers for the regiment.

From May 1941 until November 1942 the division was on anti-partisan duty in occupied Yugoslavia and then returned to Rome. After the announcement of the Armistice of Cassibile on 8 September 1943 the division was tasked to defend Italy's capital from invading German forces. By nightfall units of the Granatieri division were engaged in fierce combat with the German 2nd Fallschirmjäger Division at the Magliana bridge in the Magliana neighborhood on the southern outskirts of Rome. The grenadiers of the Granatieri division, the lancers of the Regiment "Lancieri di Montebello" (8th) and thousands of civilians fought the Germans until 10 September, when the flight of King Victor Emmanuel III to Apulia made further resistance senseless. On 12 September 1943 the Germans disbanded the division and its regiments.

For its role in the defence of the Rome the 13th Artillery Regiment "Granatieri di Sardegna" was awarded a Bronze Medal of Military Valor, which was affixed to the regiment's flag and is depicted on the regiment's coat of arms.

=== Cold War ===
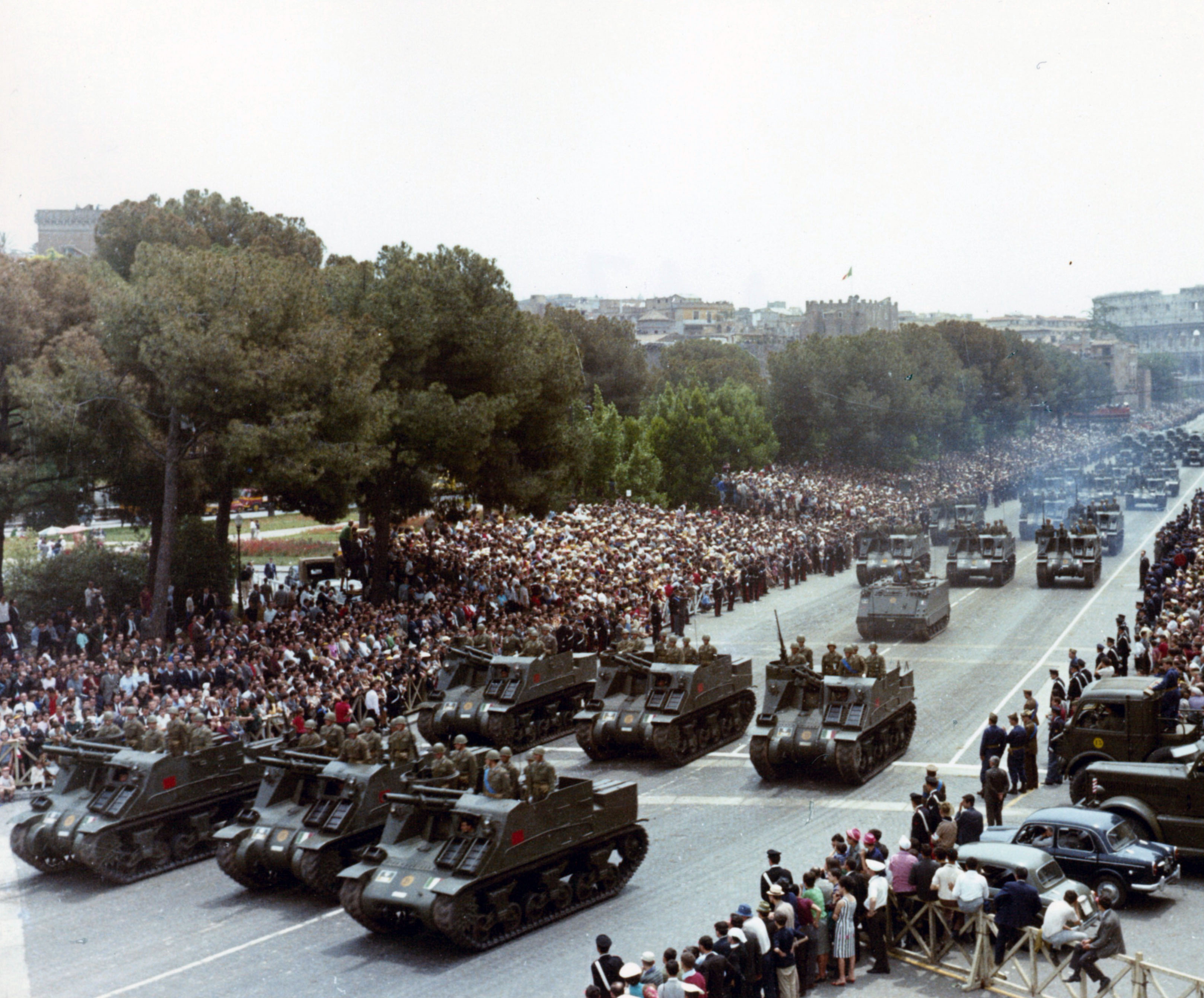
Italian Army M7 Priest self-propelled guns at the 2 June 1960 National Day parade in Rome

On 1 April 1947 the 11th Field Artillery Regiment ceded its V Group with QF 17-pounder anti-tank guns to help reform the 13th Anti-tank Field Artillery Regiment in Milan. The regiment was assigned to the Infantry Division "Legnano". By 29 February 1948 the regiment consisted of a command, a command unit, two groups with QF 17-pounder anti-tank guns, and two groups QF 6-pounder anti-tank guns, one of which was in reserve status. The next day, 1 March 1948, the regiment in Milan was renamed 27th Anti-tank Field Artillery Regiment, while in Rome the 13th Field Artillery Regiment was reformed. The regiment consisted of a command, a command unit, and two groups with QF 25-pounder field guns.

On 1 April 1948 the regiment was assigned to the reformed Infantry Division "Granatieri di Sardegna" and in August of the same year the regiment added a third group with QF 25-pounder field guns. On 1 June 1951 the regiment formed a light anti-aircraft group with 40/56 autocannons. In April 1953 the regiment received an anti-tank sub-grouping from the 1st Field Artillery Regiment and on 1 June 1953 the regiment added a group with M114 155 mm howitzers. Afterwards the regiment consisted of the following units:

- 13th Field Artillery Regiment, in Rome
  - Command Unit
  - I Group with QF 25-pounder field guns
  - II Group with QF 25-pounder field guns
  - III Group with QF 25-pounder field guns
  - IV Group with M114 155 mm howitzers
  - V Light Anti-aircraft Group with 40/56 autocannons
  - Anti-tank Sub-grouping, in L'Aquila
    - CXI Anti-tank Group with QF 17-pounder anti-tank guns
    - CXII Anti-tank Group with QF 17-pounder anti-tank guns

On 1 November 1954 the two anti-tank groups were re-equipped with M36 tank destroyers. On 2 February 1955 the regiment formed a Light Aircraft Section with L-21B artillery observation planes, which on 1 November 1956 was expanded to Light Aircraft Unit. In 1956 the Infantry Division "Granatieri di Sardegna" transferred its Artillery Specialists Unit to the regiment, which expanded the unit in 1958 to Artillery Specialists Battery. On 31 December 1956 the Self-propelled Anti-tank Sub-grouping left the regiment and the next day it joined the 9th Self-propelled Anti-tank Artillery Regiment in Lucca. In 1957 the 13th Field Artillery Regiment moved from Rome to L'Aquila, where on 1 January 1959 the regiment's first two groups were equipped with M101 105 mm howitzers. On the same day the regiment disbanded its III Group and received from the disbanded 1st Armored Artillery Regiment "Pozzuolo del Friuli" that regiment's III Group with M7 Priest self-propelled guns in Civitavecchia. On 1 February 1963 the regiment's Light Aircraft Unit was merged as 2nd Light Aircraft Section into the division's Light Aircraft Unit. On 31 August 1963 the regiment's detached I Group in Rome became a training unit assigned to the Artillery School in Bracciano. The group moved from Rome to Bracciano, but remained assigned to the 13th Field Artillery Regiment for operational use.

On 1 September 1964 the III Self-propelled Group in Civitavecchia with M7 Priest self-propelled guns was transferred to the 131st Armored Artillery Regiment, which renumbered the group was II Self-propelled Group. The regiment then formed a new III Self-propelled Group in L'Aquila. On 1 October 1965 the V Light Anti-aircraft Group was placed in reserve status.

During the 1975 army reform the army disbanded the regimental level and newly independent battalions and groups were granted for the first time their own flags. On 30 September 1975 the 13th Field Artillery Regiment and its II and III groups were disbanded, while the regiment's I and IV groups became autonomous units. The next day, on 1 October 1975, the regiment's IV Group in L'Aquila was renamed 48th Field Artillery Group "Taro" and assigned to the Motorized Brigade "Acqui". On the same the II Self-propelled Group of the 131st Armored Artillery Regiment in Civitavecchia was reorganized and renamed 13th Field Artillery Group "Magliana" and assigned to the Infantry Division "Granatieri di Sardegna". To avoid confusion with the support units of the Infantry Division "Granatieri di Sardegna" the group was named for the Magliana neighborhood in Rome, where the units of the Granatieri di Sardegna division had battled German troops from 8 to 10 September 1943.

On 2 May 1976 the regiment's I Group in Bracciano was reorganized and renamed 18th Field Artillery Group "Gran Sasso". On 1 November 1976 the Infantry Division "Granatieri di Sardegna" was reduced to Mechanized Brigade "Granatieri di Sardegna". The 13th Field Artillery Group "Magliana" was based in Civitavecchia and consisted of a command, a command and services battery, and three batteries with M114 155 mm howitzers. At the time the group fielded 485 men (37 officers, 58 non-commissioned officers, and 390 soldiers). On 12 November 1976 the President of the Italian Republic Giovanni Leone assigned with decree 846 the flag and traditions of the 13th Artillery Regiment "Granatieri di Sardegna" to the group.

=== Recent times ===
In 1991, after the end of the Cold War, the Italian Army disbanded many of its artillery units in the country's Northeast and transferred their equipment to the remaining artillery units. In 1992 the 13th Field Artillery Group "Magliana" received M109G 155 mm self-propelled howitzers. On 15 April 1992 the group was renamed 13th Self-propelled Field Artillery Group "Magliana". On 19 August 1992 the group lost its autonomy and the next day entered the 13th Self-propelled Field Artillery Regiment "Granatieri di Sardegna". On 20 September 1995 the batteries of the 7th Heavy Field Artillery Regiment "Cremona" in Turin were disbanded and the flag of that regiment was transferred to Civitavecchia, where on the same day the flag of the 13th Self-propelled Field Artillery Regiment "Granatieri di Sardegna" was prepared for the transfer to Shrine of the Flags in the Vittoriano in Rome. The next day, on 21 September 1995, the personnel and materiel of the 13th Self-propelled Field Artillery Regiment "Granatieri di Sardegna" were used to form the 7th Self-propelled Field Artillery Regiment "Cremona", and the day after the flag of the 13th Artillery Regiment "Granatieri di Sardegna" was deposited at the Shrine of the Flags.

== See also ==
- Mechanized Brigade "Granatieri di Sardegna"
