= 1st Anti-aircraft Artillery Regiment (Italy) =

Inactive Italian Army air defense unit

- 1° Reggimento Artiglieria Controaerei
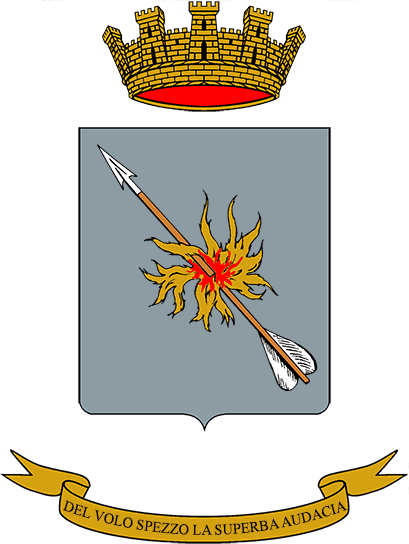
- Regimental coat of arms
- Active: 1 June 1930 — 8 Sept. 1943; 1 July 1947 — 31 May 1964
- Country: Italy
- Branch: Italian Army
- Garrison/HQ: Albenga
- Motto(s): "Del volo spezzo la superba audacia"
- Anniversaries: 15 June 1918 - Second Battle of the Piave River

Insignia
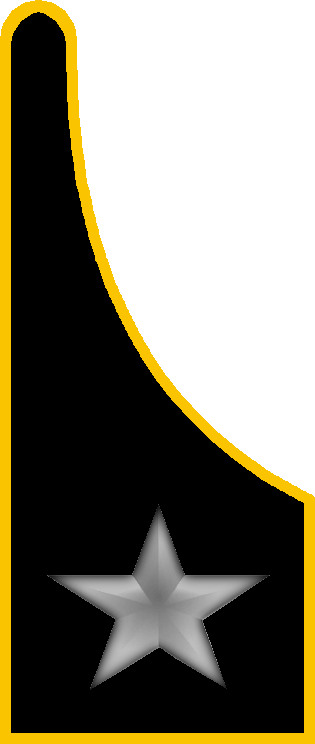
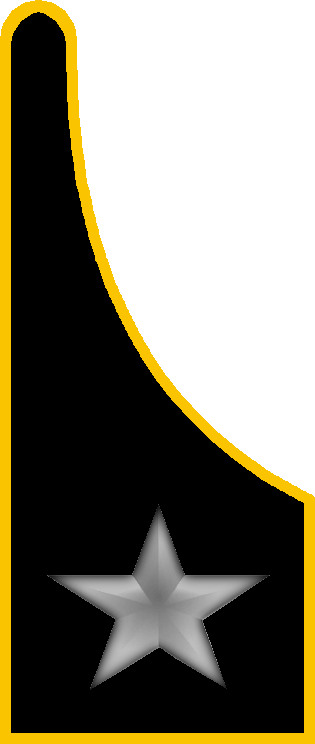
- Regimental gorget patches

The 1st Anti-aircraft Artillery Regiment (Italian: 1° Reggimento Artiglieria Controaerei) is an inactive air defense regiment of the Italian Army, which was based in Albenga in Liguria. Originally an air defense regiment of the Royal Italian Army, the unit was last active from 1947 to 1964. The regiment's anniversary falls, as for all Italian Army artillery regiments, on June 15, the beginning of the Second Battle of the Piave River in 1918.

== History ==
=== Interwar years ===
On 31 October 1926, the 8th Anti-aircraft Artillery Center was formed in Rome, which incorporated the existing 7th Anti-aircraft Group. On 1 January 1927, the center consisted of a command, a trucked group with 75/27 C.K. anti-aircraft guns, a positional group with 76/45 anti-aircraft guns, a photo-electricians unit, and a depot. The photo-electricians unit operated searchlights.

On 1 April 1930, the positional group was transferred to the 6th Anti-aircraft Artillery Center, while the 2nd Anti-aircraft Artillery Center ceded its trucked group with 75/27 C.K. anti-aircraft guns in Genoa to the 8th Anti-aircraft Artillery Center. At the same time the center formed a second photo-electricians unit. On 1 June of the same year, the center changed its name to 1st Trucked Anti-aircraft Artillery Regiment. In April 1931, the two photo-electricians units were disbanded and both of the regiment's trucked groups added a photo-electricians section and an acoustic locator squad with the personnel of the two disbanded units.

In 1933, the regiment moved from Rome to Rivoli in Piedmont. On 1 January 1934, the regiment changed its name to 1st Anti-aircraft Artillery Regiment. In 1935, the regiment was mobilized for the Second Italo-Ethiopian War: on 28 May 1935 the 4th Battery with 75/27 C.K. anti-aircraft guns, was sent to Asmara in Italian Eritrea, followed by the regiment's I Group with its three batteries in September of the same year. In October 1935, the regiment sent its II Group with its two remaining batteries to Italian Libya. An additional 350 troops were dispatched to East Africa to augment other deployed units. On 15 July 1936, the regiment was demobilized. After being demobilized the regiment moved from Rivoli to Vercelli.

=== World War II ===
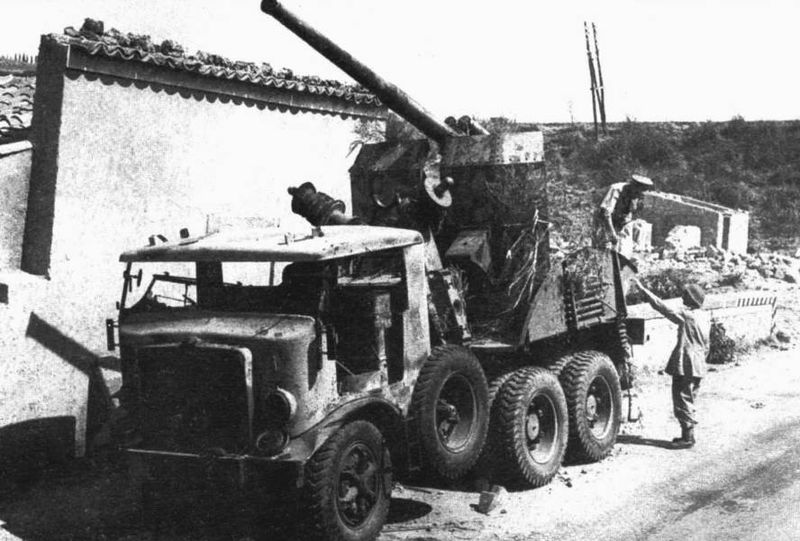
British troops in Sicily inspect an abandoned Breda 52 truck with 90/53 anti-aircraft gun

On 2 September 1939, the regiment was mobilized for service in World War II. On 10 June 1940, the day Italy entered the war, the regiment was assigned to the Artillery Command of the 4th Army and consisted of a command, a command unit, the VII and XV groups with 75/46 mod. 34 anti-aircraft guns, and the XII and XXI groups with 75/27 C.K. anti-aircraft guns. In June 1940, the 4th Army participated in the Italian invasion of France. On 24 June 1940, the Franco-Italian Armistice was signed and the following month the regiment was transferred to the 8th Army, while the regiment's XII Group moved to Sicily and the XV Group was assigned to the 6th Army.

In April 1942, the regiment's depot in Vercelli formed the XXXVIII trucked group with 75/46 mod. 34 anti-aircraft guns, and the 31st, 40th, and 42nd batteries with 20/65 mod. 35 cannons for the 4th Anti-aircraft Artillery Grouping. The grouping was assigned to the 8th Army, which was sent to the Eastern Front.

During the war the regiment's depot in Vercelli also mobilized the following units:

- XXXIX Trucked Group with 75/46 mod. 34 anti-aircraft guns
- LXXIX Trucked Group with 75/46 mod. 34 anti-aircraft guns
- DIV Trucked Group with 90/53 anti-aircraft guns on Breda 52 trucks
- X Positional Group with 75/27 A.V. anti-aircraft guns
- XLI Positional Group with 7.5cm PL vz.37 anti-aircraft guns
- XLIV Positional Group with 7.5cm PL vz.37 anti-aircraft guns
- XXV Positional Group with 7.5 cm Flak M35 (d) anti-aircraft guns
- DI Positional Group with 20/70 autocannons; the group was used to protect Italian naval transports

In the evening of 8 September 1943, the Armistice of Cassibile, which ended hostilities between the Kingdom of Italy and the Anglo-American Allies, was announced by General Dwight D. Eisenhower on Radio Algiers and by Marshal Pietro Badoglio on Italian radio. Germany reacted by invading Italy and the 1st Anti-aircraft Artillery Regiment and its depot were disbanded by German forces near Ormea soon thereafter.

=== Cold War ===
On 1 July 1947, the Italian Army reformed the regiment as 1st Light Anti-aircraft Artillery Regiment in Chieri with the personnel and materiel of the VI Anti-aircraft Group and VI/bis Anti-aircraft Group, which had both been transferred from the 7th Field Artillery Regiment. The regiment was assigned to the Infantry Division "Cremona" and consisted of a command, a command unit, the I Group with 40/56 autocannons, and the II Group with 40/56 autocannons. The following August the regiment moved from Chieri to Albenga. On 1 January 1951, the Infantry Division "Cremona" included the following artillery regiments:

- Infantry Division "Cremona", in Turin
  - 7th Field Artillery Regiment, in Turin
  - 17th Field Artillery Regiment, in Novara
  - 52nd Anti-tank Field Artillery Regiment, in Acqui
  - 1st Light Anti-aircraft Artillery Regiment, in Albenga

On 1 July 1951, the 1st Light Anti-aircraft Artillery Regiment was reorganized as 1st Heavy Anti-aircraft Artillery Regiment and transferred the I Light Anti-aircraft Group to the 7th Field Artillery Regiment and the II Light Anti-aircraft Group to the 17th Field Artillery Regiment. As replacement the regiment received the CIV Group with 90/53 anti-aircraft guns from the Anti-aircraft Artillery School.

In 1953, the regiment added a second group with 90/53 anti-aircraft guns and in 1954 a third group with 90/53 anti-aircraft guns. During the same year the regiment also added the V Light Anti-aircraft Group with 40/56 autocannons. On 1 January 1956, the regiment received the VI Light Anti-aircraft Group with 40/56 autocannons from the 1st Mountain Artillery Regiment of the Alpine Brigade "Taurinense". The next month the V and VI groups were renumbered and as IV and V groups. Also in 1956, the regiment replaced its 90/53 anti-aircraft guns with American 90/50 M1 anti-aircraft guns. At the end of the year the regiment consisted of the following units:

- 1st Heavy Anti-aircraft Artillery Regiment, in Albenga
  - Command Unit
  - I Heavy Anti-aircraft Group with 90/50 M1 anti-aircraft guns
  - II Heavy Anti-aircraft Group with 90/50 M1 anti-aircraft guns
  - III Heavy Anti-aircraft Group with 90/50 M1 anti-aircraft guns
  - IV Light Anti-aircraft Group with 40/56 autocannons
  - V Light Anti-aircraft Group with 40/56 autocannons

On 21 May 1960, the V Light Anti-aircraft Group was disbanded. On 1 November 1961, the III Heavy Anti-aircraft Group was disbanded, followed by the IV Light Anti-aircraft Group on 31 August 1963. On 31 May 1964, the regiment and the II Heavy Anti-aircraft Group were disbanded. Afterwards, the regiment's flag was transferred to the Shrine of the Flags in the Vittoriano in Rome for safekeeping. After the regiment had been disbanded, the I Heavy Anti-aircraft Group was renamed I Autonomous Heavy Anti-aircraft Artillery Group. One month later, on 30 June 1964, also the I Autonomous Heavy Anti-aircraft Artillery Group was disbanded.
