= 82nd Infantry Regiment "Torino" =

Active Italian Army infantry unit

- 82° Reggimento Fanteria "Torino"
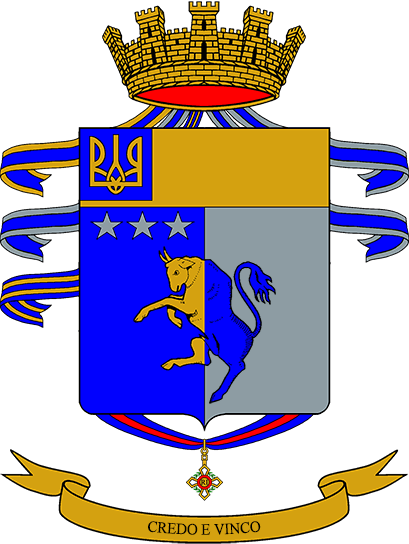
- Regimental coat of arms
- Active: 1 Nov. 1884 – 31 Oct. 1926; 1 July 1938 – Feb. 1943; 1 June 1943 – 13 Sept. 1943; 1 Sept. 1950 – today
- Country: Italy
- Branch: Italian Army
- Part of: Mechanized Brigade "Pinerolo"
- Garrison/HQ: Barletta
- Motto: "Credo e vinco"
- Anniversaries: 16 January 1943 – Battle of Tscherkovo
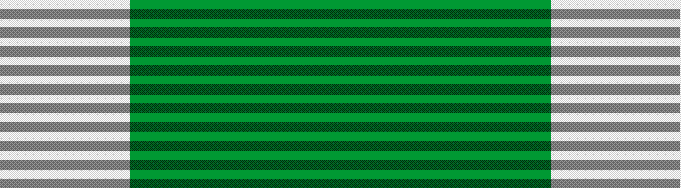
- Decorations: 1× Military Order of Italy; 1× Gold Medal of Military Valor; 3× Silver Medals of Military Valor; 1× Bronze Medal of Army Valor; 1× Gold Cross of Army Merit; 1× Italian Red Cross Bronze Medal of Merit; 1× Silver Medal of Merit

Insignia
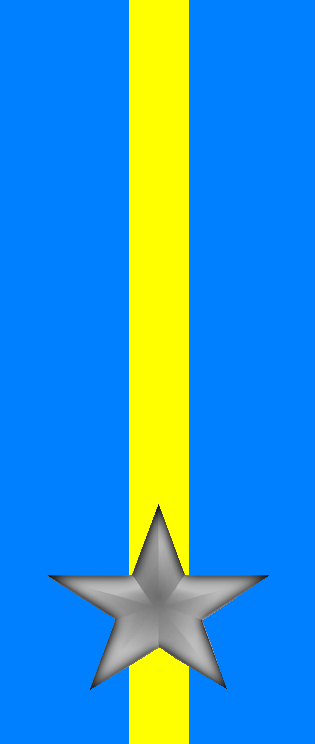
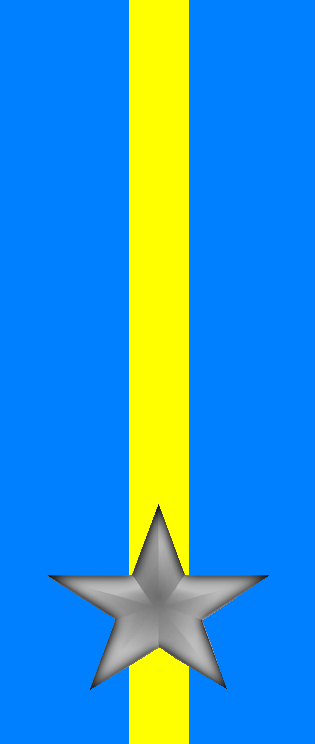
- Regimental gorget patches

The 82nd Infantry Regiment "Torino" (Italian: 82° Reggimento Fanteria "Torino") is an active unit of the Italian Army based in Barletta in Apulia. The regiment is named for the city of Turin and part of the Italian Army's infantry arm. As of 2023 the regiment is assigned to the Mechanized Brigade "Pinerolo".

The regiment was one of sixteen infantry regiments formed on 1 November 1884. In 1911–12 the regiment participated in the Italo-Turkish War. During World War I the regiment fought on the Italian front. The regiment was disbanded in 1926 and reformed in July 1938. During World War II the regiment was assigned to the 52nd Infantry Division "Torino", with which it participated in the invasion of Yugoslavia. In July 1941 the Torino division was assigned to the Italian Expeditionary Corps in Russia and the regiment fought in Donbas in Ukraine and along the Don river in southern Russia. In December 1942 the division and regiment were destroyed during the Soviet Operation Little Saturn. Reformed in June 1943 in Italy the regiment was disbanded by invading German forces after the announcement of the Armistice of Cassibile on 8 September 1943. For its conduct in Ukraine and Russia the regiment was awarded Italy's highest military honor the Gold Medal of Military Valor. Reformed in 1950 the regiment was reduced to a battalion sized unit in 1975. In 1992 the regiment was reformed and has been active as mechanized unit since then.

== History ==
=== Formation ===
On 1 November 1884 the 82nd Infantry Regiment (Brigade "Torino") was formed in Turin with companies ceded by the 26th Infantry Regiment (Brigade "Bergamo"), 56th Infantry Regiment (Brigade "Marche"), 58th Infantry Regiment (Brigade "Abruzzi"), and 60th Infantry Regiment (Brigade "Calabria"). On the same day the 81st Infantry Regiment (Brigade "Torino") was formed in Turin with companies ceded by the 25th Infantry Regiment (Brigade "Bergamo"), 55th Infantry Regiment (Brigade "Marche"), 57th Infantry Regiment (Brigade "Abruzzi"), and 59th Infantry Regiment (Brigade "Calabria"). Both regiments consisted of a staff and three battalions, with four companies per battalion. Together the two regiments formed the Brigade "Torino".

In 1895–96 the regiment provided eleven officers and 268 enlisted for units deployed to Italian Eritrea for the First Italo-Ethiopian War. In December 1908, the regiment was deployed to the area of the Strait of Messina for the recovery efforts after the 1908 Messina earthquake. For its service the regiment was awarded a Silver Medal of Merit, which was affixed to the regiment's flag.

=== Italo-Turkish War ===
In 1911 the regiment was deployed to Libya for the Italo-Turkish War. On 23 October 1911 the regiment fought in the Battle of Shar al-Shatt. Three days later regiment withstood a Turkish attack at Bu Meliana near Tripoli, for which the regiment was awarded a Silver Medal of Military Valor. On 4 December of the same year the regiment fought in the Battle of Ain Zara. In 1912 the regiment fought in the Battles of Zanzur.

=== World War I ===
At the outbreak of World War I, the Brigade "Torino" formed, together with the Brigade "Reggio" and the 13th Field Artillery Regiment, the 17th Division. At the time the 82nd Infantry Regiment consisted of three battalions, each of which fielded four fusilier companies and one machine gun section. In March 1915 the regimental depots of the 59th Infantry Regiment (Brigade "Calabria") and the 82nd Infantry Regiment formed the 131st Infantry Regiment (Brigade "Lazio"). After Italy's entry into the war on 23 May 1915 the Brigade "Torino" was deployed to the Italian front: in 1915 and 1916 the regiment operated against Austro-Hungarian forces on the Col di Lana. On 6 May 1916 the regimental depot of the 82nd Infantry Regiment formed the command of the Brigade "Avellino" and one battalion of the 231st Infantry Regiment (Brigade "Avellino"). In August 1917 the Brigade "Torino" was transferred to the Karst plateau and deployed in the area between the Vipava river and the Volkovniak hill. In October 1917, during the Austro-Hungarian Caporetto offensive the brigade repelled repeated enemy attacks from 24 to 27 October. However, due to the worsening general situation the Army Command ordered a withdrawal to the Tagliamento river and then to the Piave river, which was reached on 7 November. In the violent fighting and during the retreat the brigade lost 1,500 soldiers and 50 officers.

In June 1918 the brigade fought in the Second Battle of the Piave River in the area of the mouth of the Sile river, where the 82nd Infantry Regiment counterattacked Austro-Hungarian forces, which that had broken through the Italian lines at Caposile. On 22 June the regiment went on the offensive towards the mouth of the old Piave, fighting in marshy terrain and against a determined opponent. After 2 days of close quarter fighting, the Austro-Hungarians retreated to the northern bank of the Piave. In September 1918 the brigade was transferred to the Val Giudicarie near Stenico. In November 1918, after the Austro-Hungarian forces had been routed in the Battle of Vittorio Veneto, the regiment advanced to Mezzolombardo in Trentino. For their conduct on the Piave river the two regiments of the Brigade "Torino" were both awarded a Silver Medal of Military Valor.

=== Interwar years ===
On 31 October 1926 the brigade command and the 82nd Infantry Regiment were disbanded, while the 81st Infantry Regiment, now renamed 81st Infantry Regiment "Torino", was assigned on 25 November 1926 to the XXII Infantry Brigade, which was the infantry component of the 22nd Territorial Division of Perugia.

On 1 July 1938 the 82nd Infantry Regiment "Torino" was reformed in Civitavecchia with two battalions transferred from the 7th Infantry Regiment "Cuneo" and the 12th Infantry Regiment "Casale". The regiment also included a command company, a support weapons company equipped with 47/32 anti-tank guns, and a mortar company equipped with 81mm Mod. 35 mortars. The regiment, together with the 81st Infantry Regiment "Torino", was assigned to the Central Military Schools Command – Infantry Division "Torino" and tasked with training of personnel. On 9 April 1939 the 82nd Torino formed its III Battalion. On 5 June 1940 the division became an operational unit and separated from the Central Military Schools Command.

=== World War II ===
At the outbreak of World War II the regiment consisted of a command, a command company, three fusilier battalions, a support weapons battery equipped with 65/17 infantry support guns, and a mortar company equipped with 81mm Mod. 35 mortars. On 6 April 1941 the Torino division participated in the invasion of Yugoslavia. In early July 1941 the division returned to Civitavecchia.

In July 1941 the division was assigned to the Italian Expeditionary Corps in Russia and left Rome on 10 July 1941 for Ukraine. In fall of 1941 the division fought in Eastern Ukraine. For their conduct on the Eastern Front between August 1941 and May 1942 the two Torino infantry regiments were each awarded a Silver Medal of Military Valor. In 1942 the division was assigned to the Italian Army in Russia/8th Army, which suffered heavy losses on the Don river during the Soviet Operation Little Saturn in December 1942 and the Ostrogozhsk–Rossosh offensive, which began on 13 Januar 1943. By February 1943 the 8th Army had been destroyed and some 8,000 men of the Torino division were killed or missing, including 2,608 of the 3,300 men of 82nd Infantry Regiment "Torino". For their sacrifice on the Don river the 81st Infantry Regiment "Torino" and 82nd Infantry Regiment "Torino" were both awarded a Gold Medal of Military Valor.

The survivors of the division returned to Italy, where on 1 June 1943 the 159th Infantry Division "Veneto" was renamed 52nd Infantry Division "Torino", and the 256th Infantry Regiment "Veneto" was renamed 82nd Infantry Regiment "Torino". After the announcement of the Armistice of Cassibile on 8 September 1943 the Torino division resisted from 9 to 13 September invading German forces and Yugoslav partisans, but on 13 September the division surrendered to the Germans and was disbanded.

=== Cold War ===
On 1 September 1950 the 82nd Infantry Regiment "Torino" was reformed in Forlì with a battalion ceded by the 87th Infantry Regiment "Friuli". The regiment was assigned to the Infantry Division "Trieste", which also included the 40th Infantry Regiment "Bologna" and 21st Field Artillery Regiment. At the time the 82nd Infantry Regiment "Torino" consisted of the following units:

- 82nd Infantry Regiment "Torino", in Forlì
  - Command, and Command Company
  - I Battalion (ceded by the 87th Infantry Regiment "Friuli")
  - II Battalion (formed on 11 October 1950)
  - III Battalion (formed on 10 October 1951)
  - Mortar Company (formed in February 1951, with 81mm Mod. 35 mortars)
  - Anti-tank Cannons Company (formed in April 1951, with QF 6-pounder anti-tank guns)

On 15 July 1951, the 6th Armored Cavalry Regiment "Lancieri di Aosta" joined the Infantry Division "Trieste". In October 1954, the Trieste United States Troops and British Element Trieste Force began to depart from the city of Trieste, which was scheduled to return to Italian control on 26 October 1954. On 15 October, in preparation for the handover, the Italian Army formed the Grouping "Trieste" in Udine. The grouping consisted of units drawn from the Infantry Division "Trieste": part of the division's command, the 82nd Infantry Regiment "Torino" and the I Group of the 21st Field Artillery Regiment. On 23 October the Infantry Division "Trieste" was officially disbanded. The 40th Infantry Regiment "Bologna" and the 21st Artillery Regiment were assigned to the newly formed Grouping "Bologna", while the 6th Armored Cavalry Regiment "Lancieri di Aosta" was transferred to the VI Territorial Military Command.

On 26 October 1954, Trieste returned to Italian control and the Grouping "Trieste" moved to the city. In Trieste the 82nd Infantry Regiment "Torino" was based in the barracks at Opicina. On 15 September 1955, the Grouping "Trieste" was disbanded and the regiment was assigned to the Infantry Division "Folgore". On 1 October 1962 the regiment formed the IV Mechanized Battalion. In 1965 the regiment moved to Gorizia and the Regiment "Piemonte Cavalleria" (2nd) took over the barracks in Opicina.

During the 1975 army reform the Italian Army disbanded the regimental level and newly independent battalions were granted for the first time their own flags. On 19 October 1975 the 82nd Infantry Regiment "Torino" and three of its four battalions were disbanded. The next day the regiment's II Battalion in Cormons was renamed 82nd Mechanized Infantry Battalion "Torino" and assigned the flag and traditions of the 82nd Infantry Regiment "Torino". The battalion consisted of a command, a command and services company, three mechanized companies with M113 armored personnel carriers, and a heavy mortar company with M106 mortar carriers with 120mm Mod. 63 mortars. At the time the battalion fielded 896 men (45 officers, 100 non-commissioned officers, and 751 soldiers).

On 1 November 1975 the personnel of the regimental command of the 82nd Infantry Regiment "Torino" formed the command of the Mechanized Brigade "Gorizia" in the city of Gorizia. On the same date the 82nd Mechanized Infantry Battalion "Torino" was assigned to the brigade, which in turn was assigned to the Mechanized Division "Folgore".

For its conduct and work after the 1976 Friuli earthquake the battalion was awarded a Bronze Medal of Army Valor, which was affixed to the battalion's flag and added to the battalion's coat of arms.

=== Recent times ===
On 2 September 1992 the 82nd Mechanized Infantry Battalion "Torino" lost its autonomy and the next day the battalion entered the reformed 82nd Infantry Regiment "Torino" as I Mechanized Battalion. In 1993–94 the regiment participated in Operation Sicilian Vespers to maintain public order in Sicily and in Operation "Testuggine" to guard Italy's eastern border. After severe floods in the Province of Asti personnel of the regiment were dispatched between 11 November and 1 December 1994 to assist the affected population.

On 30 October 1996 the Mechanized Brigade "Gorizia" was disbanded and the 82nd Infantry Regiment "Torino" was assigned to the Mechanized Brigade "Mantova". The Mantova was disbanded on 30 August 1997 and the 82nd Infantry Regiment "Torino" now joined the 132nd Armored Brigade "Ariete". On 5 November 2001 the 82nd Regiment "Torino" moved from Cormons to Barletta in southern Italy, where the regiment joined the Armored Brigade "Pinerolo".

Since then the 82nd Infantry Regiment "Torino" took part in international missions in the Balkans, in 2004–2005 in Albania (Operation NHQT), in 2006 in Bosnia (Operation Althea), and in 2008 in Kosovo (Kosovo Force). In May 2009, the regiment was chosen to become the army's digitalization testbed and the received new vehicles and equipment.

== Organization ==
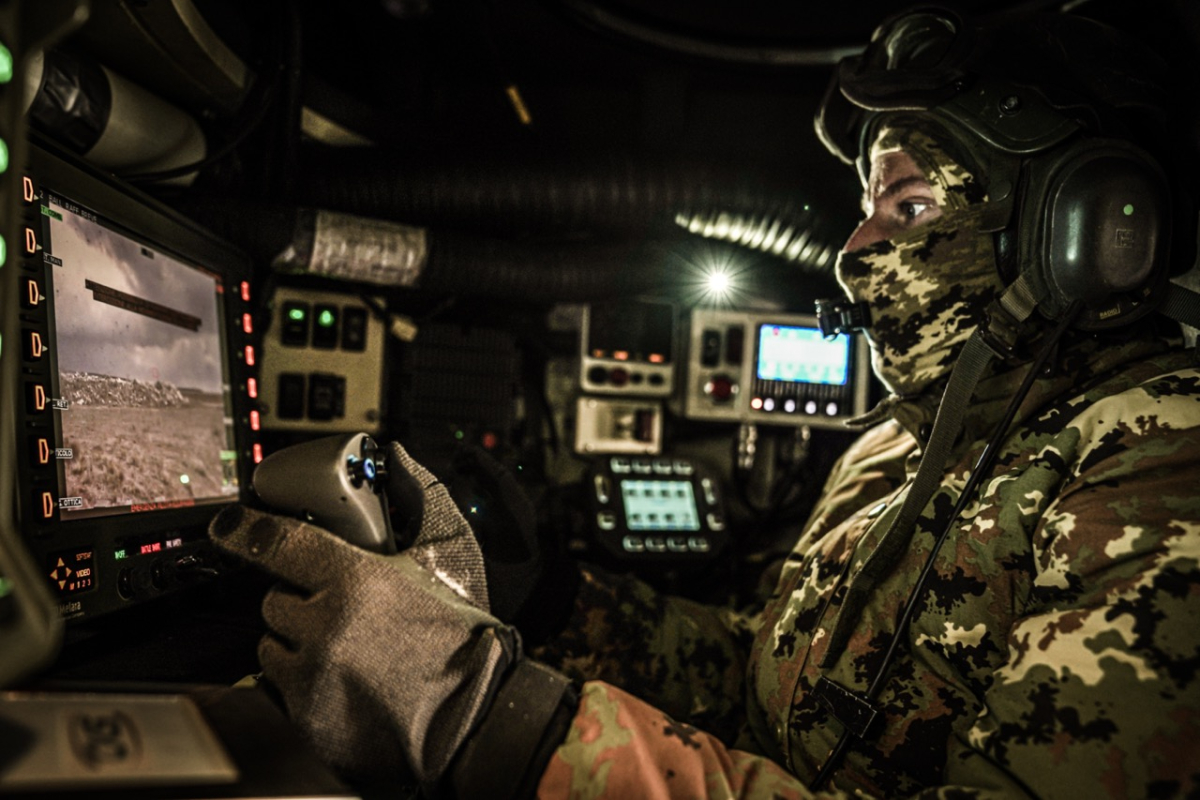
82nd Infantry Regiment "Torino" Freccia IFV commander at his station

As of 2024 the 82nd Infantry Regiment "Torino" is organized as follows:

- 82nd Infantry Regiment "Torino", in Barletta
  - Command and Logistic Support Company
  - 1st Mechanized Battalion
    - 1st Fusiliers Company
    - 2nd Fusiliers Company
    - 3rd Fusiliers Company
    - Maneuver Support Company

The regiment is equipped with Freccia wheeled infantry fighting vehicles. The Maneuver Support Company is equipped with Freccia mortar carries with 120mm mortars and Freccia IFVs with Spike LR anti-tank guided missiles. Each of the regiment's three fusilier companies consists of three platoons, which each field four Freccia IFVs and 44 soldiers: three of the Freccia IFVs carry a crew of three and a rifle squad of eight men, while the fourth Freccia IFV carries a crew of three, a maneuver support team of six and the platoon commander with his radio operator.

== See also ==
- Mechanized Brigade "Pinerolo"
