= 10 cm M. 14 Feldhaubitze =

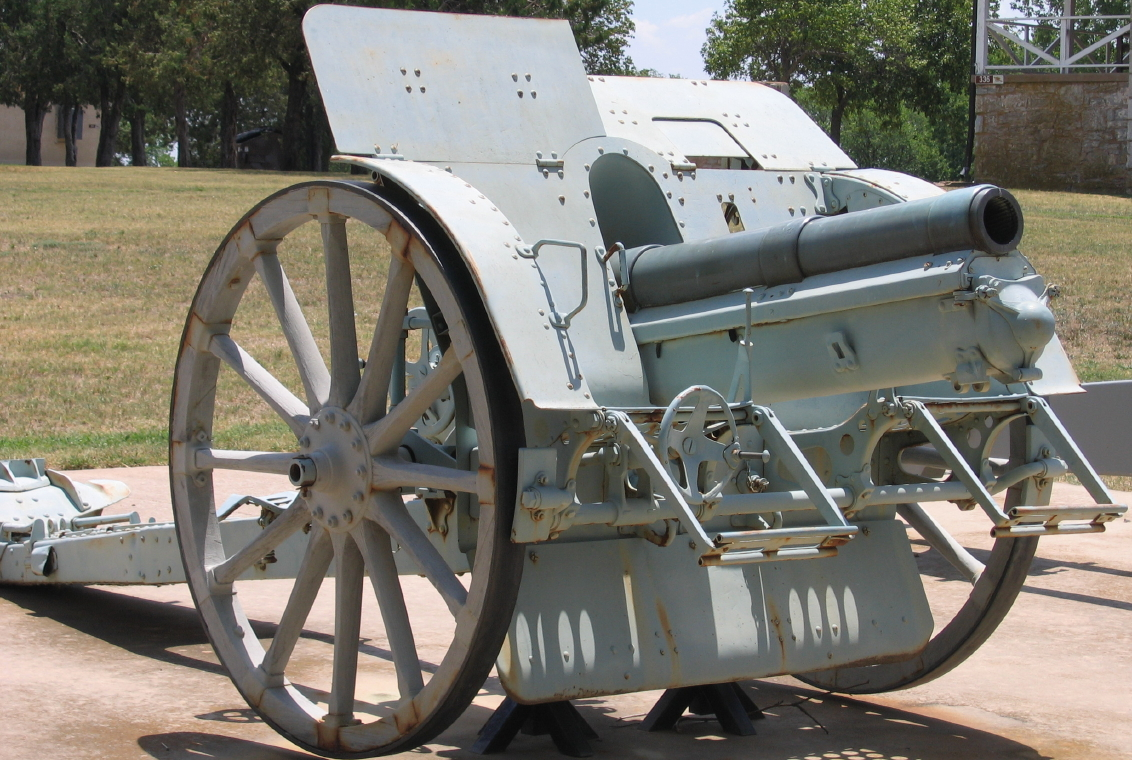
- Type: Howitzer
- Place of origin: Austria-Hungary

Service history
- In service: 1914–1945
- Used by: Austria-Hungary; Albania; Austria; Czechoslovakia; Nazi Germany; Greece; Italy; Hungary; Poland; Russia; Slovakia; Yugoslavia
- Wars: World War I Turkish War of Independence; Second Italo-Ethiopian War; Spanish Civil War; World War II

Production history
- Designer: Škoda
- Manufacturer: Škoda
- Produced: 1914–1918
- No. built: 6,458

Specifications
- Mass: 1,350 kg (2,970 lbs)
- Barrel length: 1.93 m (6 ft 4 in) L/19
- Crew: 6
- Shell: Separate loading, cased charge and projectile 100 x 183mm R 14 kg (31 lb)
- Caliber: 100 mm (3.93 in)
- Breech: horizontal sliding-block
- Recoil: hydro-spring variable recoil
- Carriage: box trail
- Elevation: -8° to +50°
- Traverse: 6°
- Rate of fire: 6-8 rpm
- Muzzle velocity: 407 m/s (1,335 ft/s)
- Maximum firing range: 8,400 m (9,100 yards)

The 10 cm M. 14 Feldhaubitze (Škoda houfnice vz 14) was a dual-purpose field and mountain gun used by Austria-Hungary during World War I, with variations of the 14 and improved 14/19 used by several countries afterwards, especially Italy. It was a conventional design, although the first versions used an obsolescent wrought bronze barrel liner and a cast bronze jacket. Later versions used a standard steel barrel.

== Royal Italian Army ==
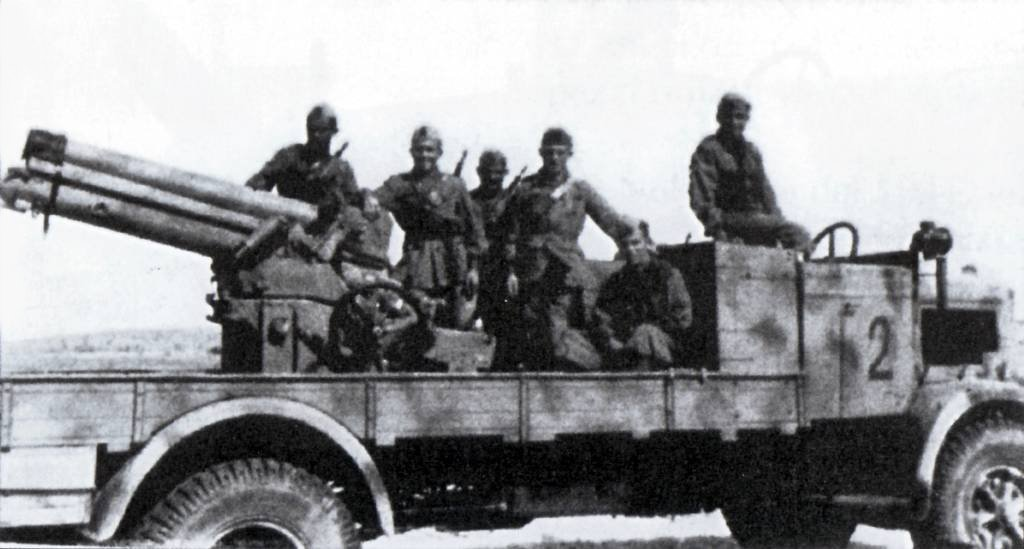
100/17 Lancia 3Ro anti-tank cannon during the North African Campaign

During World War I the Royal Italian Army had captured 1,222 10 cm Mod. 14/16 howitzers from the Austro-Hungarian Army. A further 1,472 were given to Italy as war reparations. In Italian service the guns were designated Obice da 100/17 Mod. 14 and Obice da 100/17 Mod. 16. The Royal Army Arsenal in Turin developed a new series of ammunition for the howitzers which were introduced in 1932 and included chemical warfare grenades.

The 100/17 was used in the Second Italo-Ethiopian War and the Spanish Civil War.

At the outbreak of World War II the Royal Army and the Guardia alla Frontiera were fielding 1,325 Mod. 14 in the original Austro-Hungarian configuration, 199 of the upgraded models which had their wooden wheels replaced with tires, and 181 Mod. 16s. During the North African Campaign Italian forces mounted the 100/17 Mod. 14 onto Lancia 3Ro heavy trucks and employed the gun as a mobile anti-tank/infantry support cannon. The 100/17 also served in Italian East Africa and the Russian Front.

== Italian Army ==
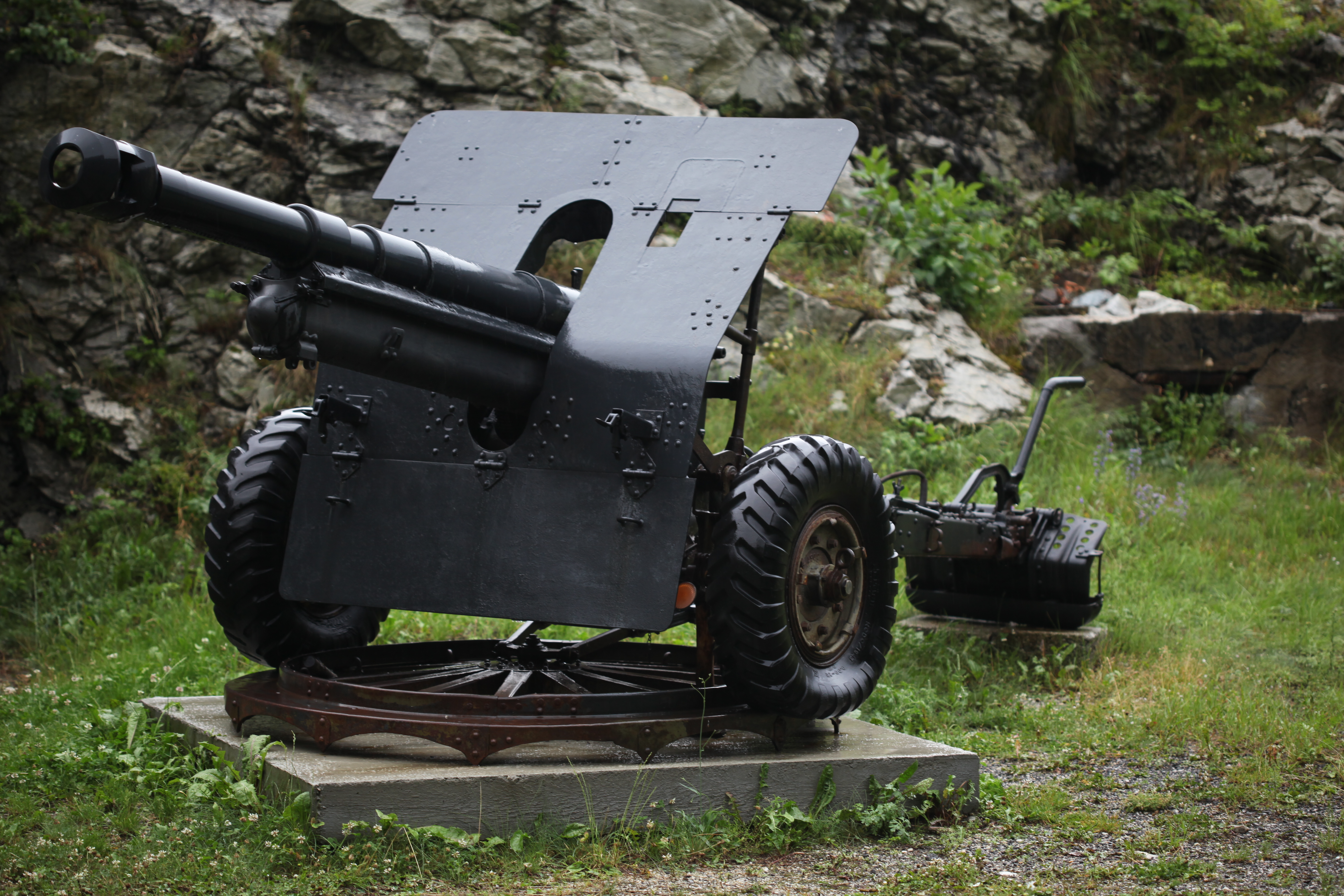
Italian Army 105/22 Mod. 14/61

After World War II some of the howitzers were modified by the Military Arsenal of Naples for use as mountain artillery, with the denominations 100/17 Mod. 14 mont. and 100/17 Mod. 16 mont. In the second half of the fifties the howitzers were further modified for the service in the Italian Army with the versions 100/17 Mod. 14/50 for field artillery units and 100/17 Mod. 14/16/50 for mountain artillery units. The modification of the field artillery version included a circular shooting platform, pneumatic wheels and a gun shield taken from reserve Ordnance QF 25-pounder howitzers, while the mountain artillery version omitted the circular shooting platform.

In 1961 the weapon was again modified by lengthening the barrel and recalibrating it for NATO ammunition, resulting in a barrel to caliber ratio of 105/22. Accordingly, the new version was named: 105/22 Mod. 14/61. With the Italian Army's 1975 reform the 105/22 Mod. 14/61 was taken out of service and stored as reserve until after the dissolution of the Warsaw Pact.

Today only one 105/22 Mod. 14/61 remains in service with the Italian Army: located in Rome on the Janiculum it is fired since 1991 at noon every day to indicate the time.

== Škoda houfnice vz 14/19 ==
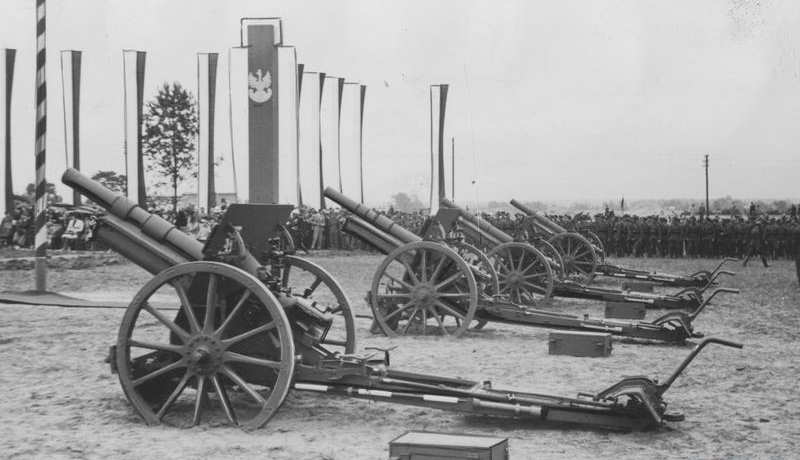
Polish 100 mm wz.1914/19P howitzers

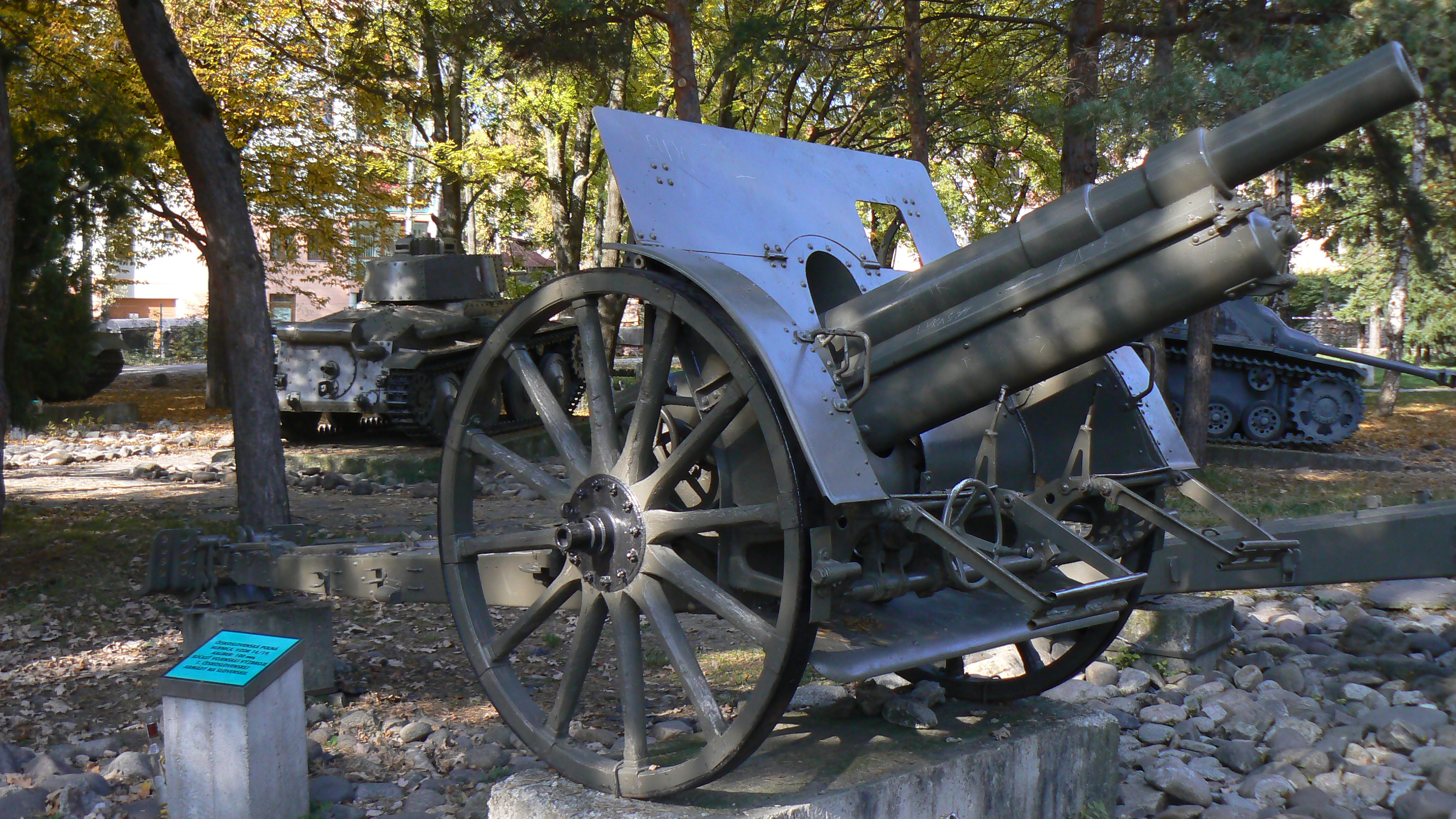
In the Museum of the Slovak National Uprising, Slovakia

An improved version of the howitzer was created in 1919. A longer barrel was fitted which, with new vz.21 shells, increased the range from 8,100 m to 9,900 m. Other minor improvements were also implemented such as a strengthened axle and camshaft along with modifications to other parts to work best with the new barrel and ordinance. 605 pieces were delivered to the Czechoslovak Army.

=== Statistics ===
Caliber: 100 mm
Length: 2.4 m [L/24 Calibres or 94.5 inches]
Weight: 2025 kg (when travelling); 1505 kg (in action)
Range: 9970 m
Traverse: 5.5°
Elevation: - 7.5° to + 48°
Weight of shell: 14 kg

== Use by other countries ==
Poland purchased several pieces and also produced around 900 pieces of their own licensed version of the 14/19, with minor modifications, as the haubica 100 mm wz. 1914/19A or wz. 1914/19P. Eight pieces had their wooden wheels replaced with rubber wheels to be towed by C4P artillery tractors for the 1st Motorized Regiment in 1937. Artillery units were equipped with 517 pieces in 1939. Thirteen pieces were used as armament for armored trains.

Romania owned over 200 model 14 howitzers which were used by the Third Division of the Light Artillery Regiment. These were modernized in 1934 and received the designation 19/34. A battery of 14/19 howitzers was used by the Croatian army against the partisan forces of Josef Tito.

After 1943 captured weapons were used by Nazi Germany's Wehrmacht under the designations 10 cm leFH 14(ö) for Austrian guns and 10 cm leFH 315(i) for Italian models. Czech 14/19 guns were given the designation 10 cm leichte Feld-Haubitze 14/19 (Tschechische) or 10 cm leFH 14/19(t) ("100m Light Field Howitzer 14/19 (Czechoslovak)") in German service. Captured Yugoslavian models were designated 10 cm leFH 316(j) and Greek models were designated 10 cm leFH 318(g).Captured Polish models were designated 10 cm leFH 14/19(p).

== Notes ==
Note: The data for this howitzer differs between sources, also considering how often it was modified, and cannot be considered definitive. Data provided has generally been for a steel-tubed howitzer as given at the U.S. Army Field Artillery Museum, Ft. Sill, Oklahoma.

- Englemann, Joachim and Scheibert, Horst. Deutsche Artillerie 1934-1945: Eine Dokumentation in Text, Skizzen und Bildern: Ausrüstung, Gliderung, Ausbildung, Führung, Einsatz. Limburg/Lahn, Germany: C. A. Starke, 1974
- Gander, Terry and Chamberlain, Peter. Weapons of the Third Reich: An Encyclopedic Survey of All Small Arms, Artillery and Special Weapons of the German Land Forces 1939-1945. New York: Doubleday, 1979 ISBN 0-385-15090-3
