= Cannone da 75/27 modello 11 =

Cannone da 75 modello 11
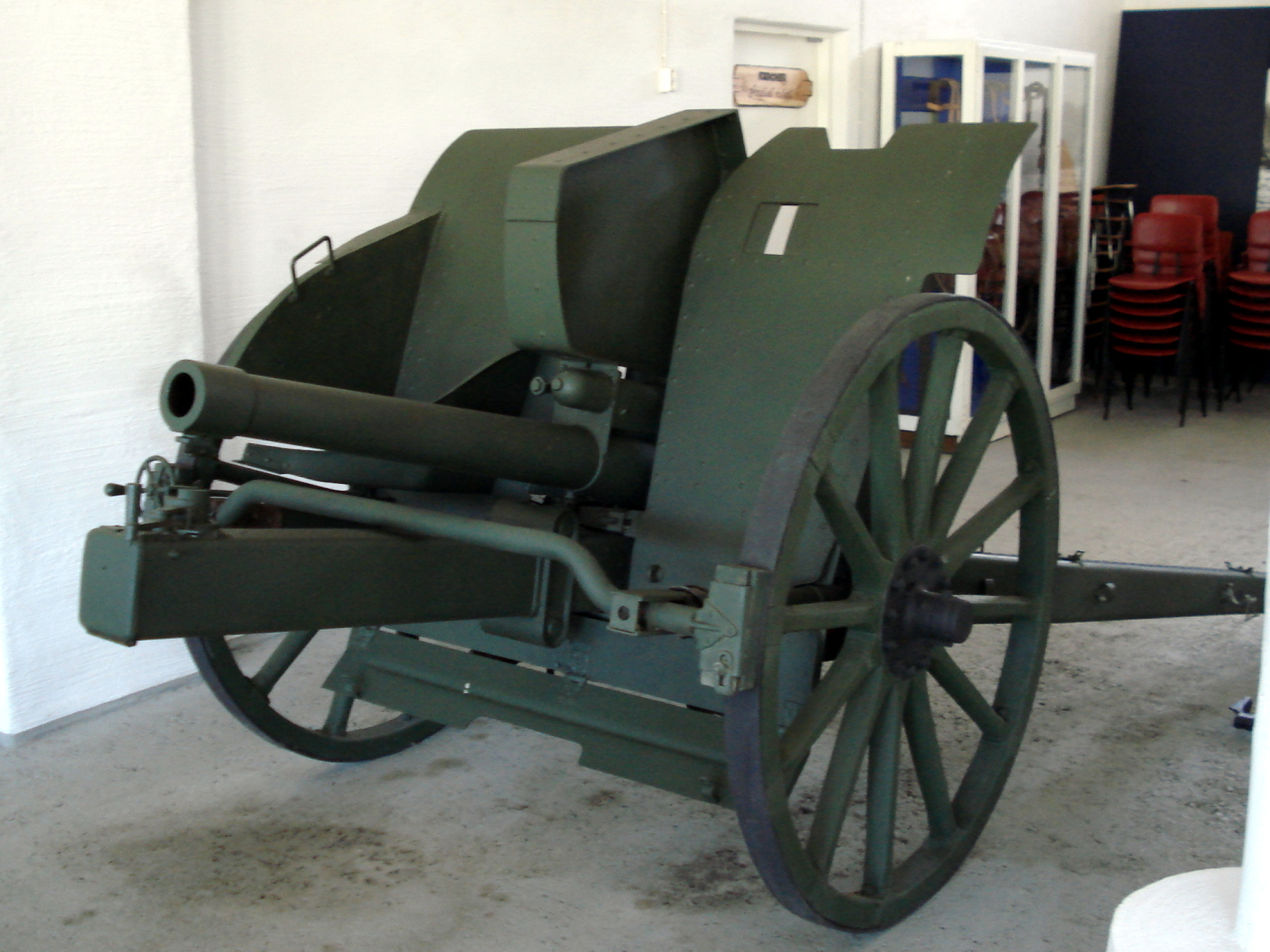
- Cannone da 75/27 modello 11, displayed in Hämeenlinna Artillery Museum.
- Type: Field gun
- Place of origin: France

Service history
- In service: 1912–45
- Used by: Kingdom of Italy; Nazi Germany; Finland
- Wars: World War I World War II

Production history
- Manufacturer: Vickers-Terni, Armstrong
- No. built: 1341

Specifications
- Mass: 1,076 kilograms (2,372 lb) (travel); 1,015 kilograms (2,238 lb) (combat)
- Barrel length: 2.13 m (7 ft) L/28.4p
- Shell: Fixed QF 75 x 185mm R
- Shell weight: 6.35 kg (14.0 lb)
- Caliber: 75 mm (2.95 in)
- Breech: Nordenfelt eccentric screw
- Recoil: hydro spring dual recoil
- Carriage: Split trail
- Elevation: -15° to +65°
- Traverse: 52° 9'
- Rate of fire: 4-6 rpm
- Muzzle velocity: 510 m/s (1,670 ft/s)
- Maximum firing range: 10,240 m (11,200 yd)

The Cannone da 75/27 modello 11 was a French-designed field gun produced in Italy prior to World War I. It was introduced in 1912, designed by Joseph-Albert Deport. It was taken into service by Italy for use with its infantry divisions into World War I, and was built there in large numbers. The gun was designed with two notable features. It was the first artillery piece to introduce the split trail, as well as the last to utilize its novel dual-recoil system. The former became a very popular feature on artillery pieces through to the modern day. The later, while functional, did not get repeated. The dual-recoil system consisted of a small tubular recoil under the barrel which in turn traveled in a traditional rectangular cradle. This lessened heat transfer from the gun barrel to the recoil mechanism effectively, but was not necessary for the added complexity.

Some guns had two crew seats on the front of the gun shield.

The gun was used by the Italian army throughout World War I and remained on strength well into World War II. Many pieces even saw service with German forces fighting in Northern Italy from 1943 until the end of the war, as the 7.5 cm Feldkanone 244(i). Modello 11s were retired from active service in 1950.

One cannon was also sold to Finland in 1929 where it was designated as "75 K 11".

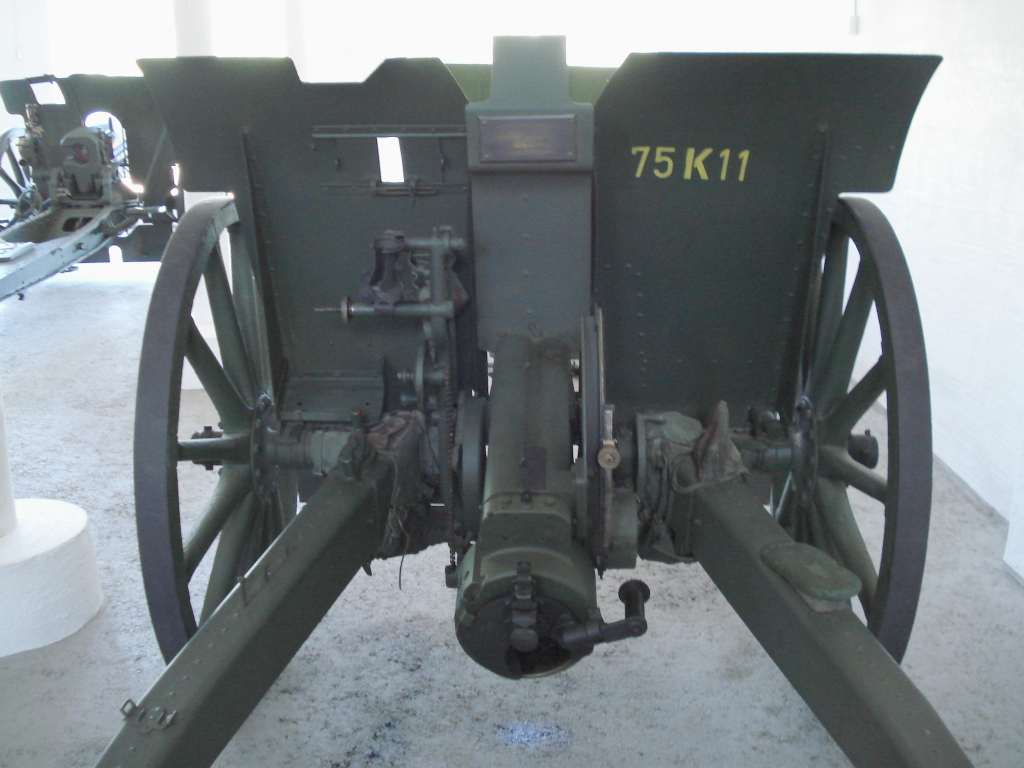
Rear view.

== Bibliography ==
- Chamberlain, Peter & Gander, Terry. Light and Medium Field Artillery. New York: Arco, 1975
- Gander, Terry and Chamberlain, Peter. Weapons of the Third Reich: An Encyclopedic Survey of All Small Arms, Artillery and Special Weapons of the German Land Forces 1939-1945. New York: Doubleday, 1979 ISBN 0-385-15090-3
