= Supreme Headquarters Allied Powers Europe =

NATO headquarters in Belgium

- Coat of arms
- Founded: 1951
- Branch: ACO
- Part of: North Atlantic Treaty Organization
- Location: Mons, Belgium; 50°30′01.6″N 3°58′59.7″E
- Mottos: "Vigilia Pretium Libertatis" (Latin) "Vigilance is the Price of Liberty"
- Website: shape.nato.int

Commanders
- Commander: General Alexus Grynkewich (USAF)
- Deputy Commander: Air Chief Marshal Sir John Stringer (Royal Air Force)
- Chief of Staff: General Markus Laubenthal (German Army)

Insignia
- Achievement

- Standard

The Supreme Headquarters Allied Powers Europe (SHAPE) is the military headquarters of the North Atlantic Treaty Organization's (NATO) Allied Command Operations (ACO) that commands all NATO operations worldwide. SHAPE is situated in the village of Casteau, near Mons, Belgium.

ACO's and SHAPE's commander is titled Supreme Allied Commander Europe (SACEUR), and is always a U.S. four-star general officer or flag officer who also serves as Commander, U.S. European Command.

From 1951 to 2003, SHAPE was the headquarters of Allied Command Europe (ACE). Since 2003 SHAPE has been the headquarters of ACO, controlling NATO also outside Europe. Even though the geographical scope of its activities was extended, SHAPE retained its traditional name with reference to Europe.

== History ==
=== Premises ===
==== 1 January 1951 – 2 April 1951: Hôtel Astoria, Paris, France ====
General Eisenhower arrived in Paris on 1 January 1951, and quickly set to work with a small group of planners to devise a structure for the new European command. The Planning Group worked in the Hotel Astoria in central Paris while construction of a permanent facility began.

==== 2 April 1951 – 31 March 1967: Rocquencourt, Yvelines, France ====
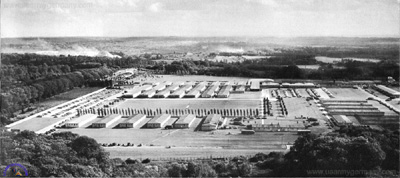
SHAPE premises in Rocquencourt (1965)

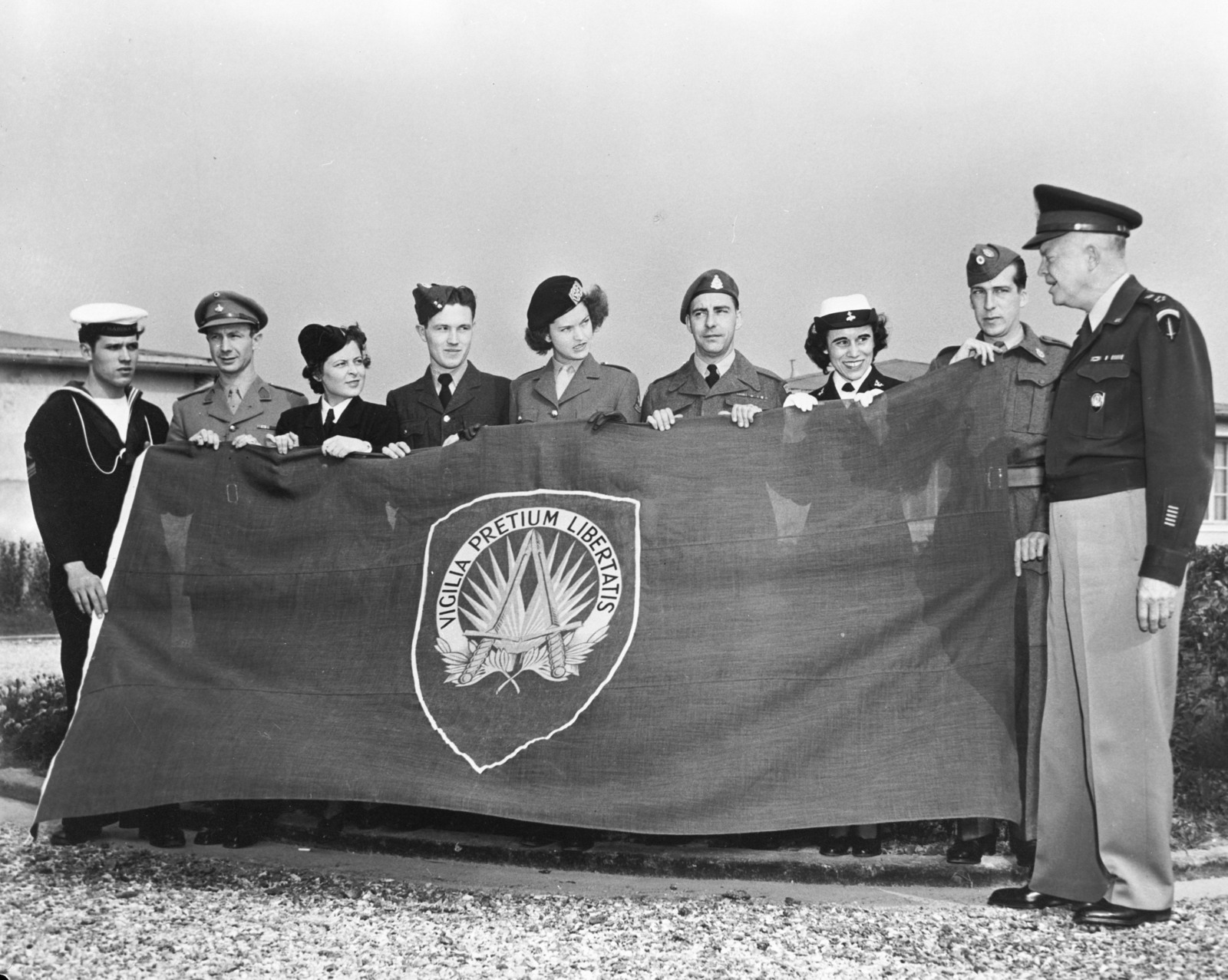
Gen. Eisenhower in front of the flag of SHAPE on 8 October 1951

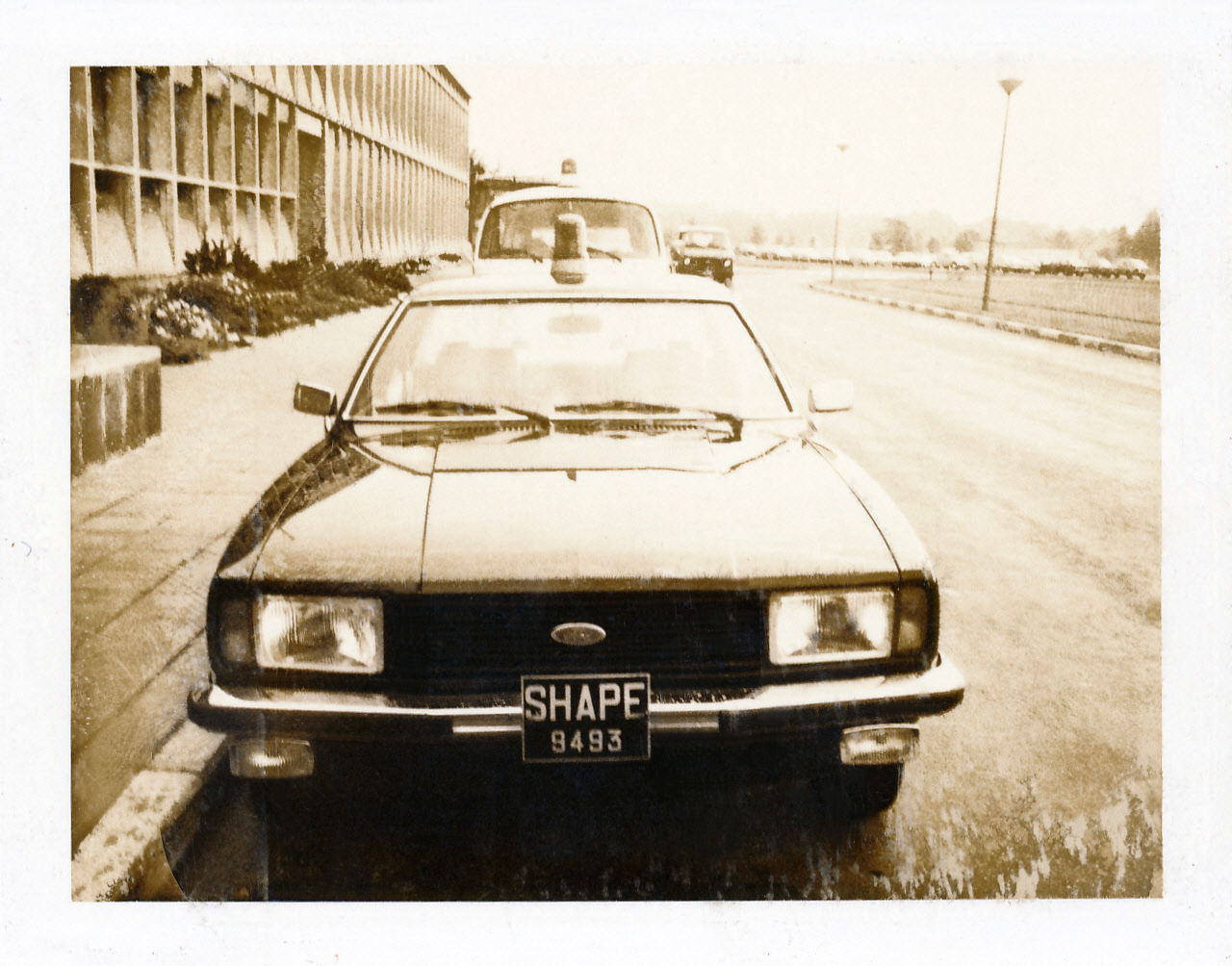
1979 military police and gendarmerie vehicles of the Supreme Headquarters Allied Powers Europe parked in front of the Main Building in Casteau (Belgium)

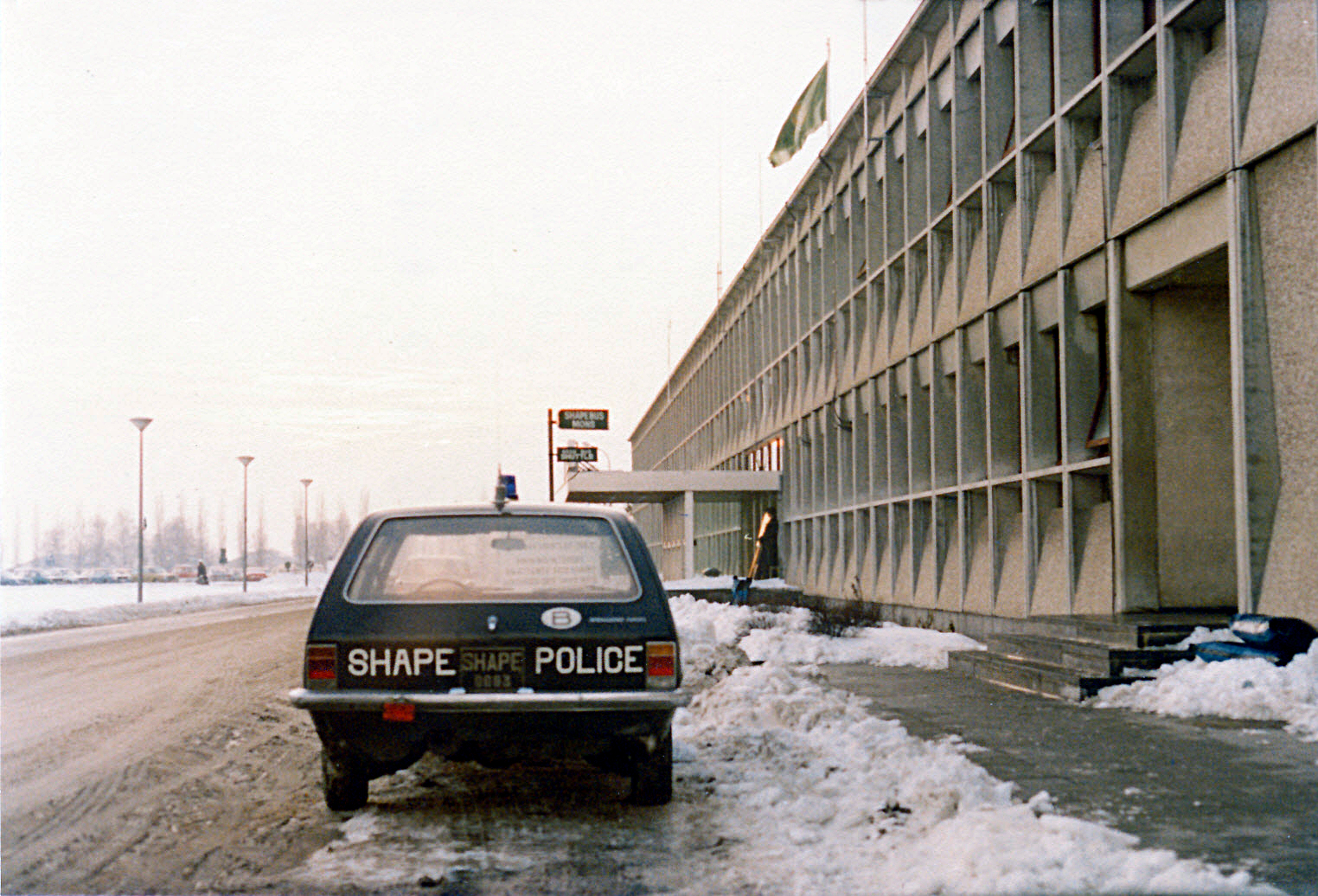
Façade of the Main Building in 1979

On 2 April 1951 SHAPE moved to its permanent facility at Rocquencourt, just west of the city, at Camp Voluceau next to Versailles.

France's resentment over NATO's military structure had been brewing for a number of years, as successive French governments had become increasingly incensed with Anglo-American domination of the command structure and insufficient French influence. In February 1966 President Charles de Gaulle stated that the changed world order had "stripped NATO of its justification" for military integration, and soon afterward, France stated that it was withdrawing from the NATO military structure. SHAPE and all the other NATO installations, including NATO Headquarters and Allied Forces Central Europe (AFCENT), were informed that they must leave French territory by April 1967.

France's withdrawal from NATO's integrated military structure forced SHAPE and several other ACE headquarters to leave French territory.

==== 31 March 1967 – present: Casteau, Wallonia, Belgium ====
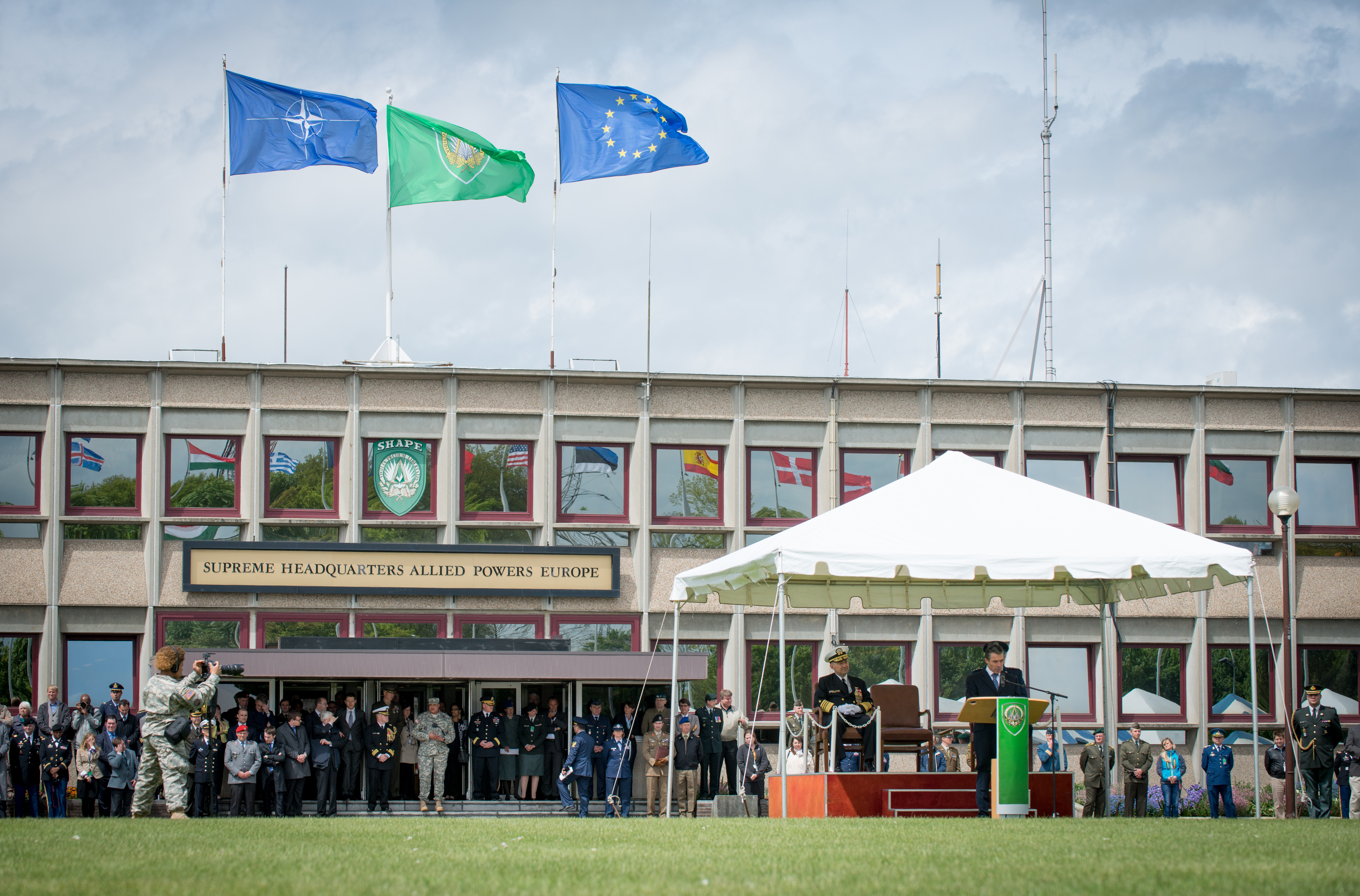
2013 SACEUR change of command, in front of SHAPE's main building

With France no longer available, Belgium was chosen as a new host nation for both NATO's political headquarters and SHAPE.

General Lyman Lemnitzer, SACEUR at the time, had hoped that SHAPE could be located near to NATO Headquarters, as had been the case in Paris, but the Belgian authorities decided that SHAPE should be located at least 50 kilometres from Brussels, NATO's new location, because SHAPE was a major wartime military target. The Belgian government offered Camp Casteau, a 2 km^{2} Belgian Army summer training camp north of the city of Mons, southwest of Brussels, which was an area in serious need of additional economic investment. In September 1966, NATO agreed that Belgium should host SHAPE at Casteau. SHAPE closed its facility at Rocquencourt near Paris on 30 March 1967, and the next day held a ceremony to mark the opening of the new headquarters at Casteau.

=== Changing role in NATO's command structure ===
==== 1951–2003: Headquarters of Allied Command Europe ====
From 1951 to 2003, SHAPE was the headquarters of Allied Command Europe (ACE).

An integrated military structure for NATO was first established after the Korean War raised questions over the strength of Europe's defenses against a Soviet attack. The first choice for commander in Europe was American General of the Army Dwight D. Eisenhower, as he had successfully directed the Allied landings in Normandy and subsequent march into Germany during World War II, amid many inter-Allied controversies over the proper conduct of the campaign on the Western Front. On 19 December 1950, the North Atlantic Council announced the appointment of General Eisenhower as the first SACEUR. British Field Marshal Sir Bernard L. Montgomery moved over from the predecessor Western Union Defence Organization (WUDO) to become the first Deputy SACEUR, who would serve until 1958. Volume 3 of Nigel Hamilton's Life of Montgomery of Alamein gives a good account of Montgomery's exacting, tireless approach to improving the command's readiness, which caused a good deal of bruised feelings in doing so. In establishing the command, the first NATO planners drew extensively on WUDO plans and personnel.

Devising command arrangements in the Central Region, which contained the bulk of NATO's forces, proved to be much more complicated. General Eisenhower considered naming an overall Commander-in-Chief (C-in-C) there as well but soon realized it would be difficult to find an arrangement that would satisfy all three major powers with forces in the Center—the United States, United Kingdom and France—as they had strongly differing views on the proper relationship of air and ground power. Drawing upon his World War II experience, General Eisenhower decided to retain overall control himself and did not appoint a C-in-C for the Central Region. Instead there would be three separate C-in-C's (air, land, and sea).

In December 1950 it was announced that the forces initially to come under General Eisenhower's command were to be the U.S. Seventh Army in Germany, the British Army of the Rhine (BAOR), with the 2nd Infantry and 7th Armoured Divisions, to be bolstered by the 11th Armoured Division and a further infantry division, three French divisions in Germany and Austria, the Danish, Belgian, and the Independent Norwegian Brigades in Western Germany, and the American and British garrisons in Austria, Trieste, and Berlin. Four days after Eisenhower's arrival in Paris, on 5 January 1951, the Italian defence minister, Randolfo Pacciardi, announced that three Italian divisions were to be formed as Italy's 'initial contribution to the Atlantic army', and that these divisions would also come under Eisenhower's control.

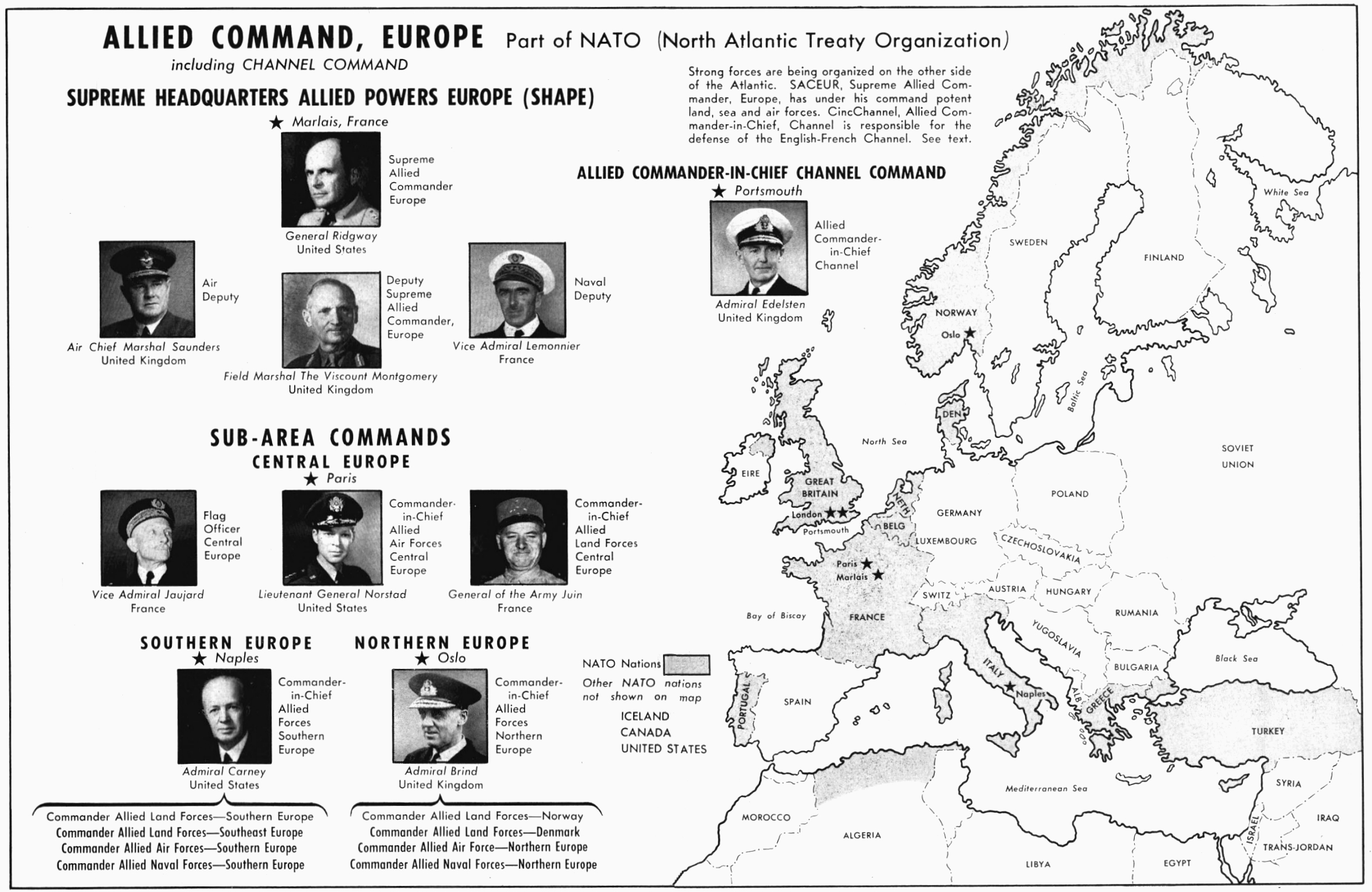
Organization of ACE in 1952

On 2 April 1951, General Eisenhower signed the activation order for Allied Command Europe and its headquarters at SHAPE. Headquarters, Allied Forces Central Europe (AFCENT) was activated in Fontainebleau, France in 1953. On the same day, ACE's subordinate headquarters in Northern and Central Europe were activated, with the Southern Region following in June.

By 1954 ACE's forces consisted of Allied Forces Northern Europe, at Oslo, Allied Forces Central Europe (Fontainebleau), Allied Forces Southern Europe (Paris/Naples) and Allied Forces Mediterranean at Malta.

The commanders and commands in 1957 were:

- Supreme Allied Commander Europe (SACEUR) – General Lauris Norstad, United States Air Force
  - Deputy Supreme Allied Commander Europe (DSACEUR) – Field Marshal The Viscount Montgomery of Alamein, British Army
    - Chief of Staff (COFS) – General Courtlandt Van Rensselaer Schuyler, United States Army
  - Allied Forces Northern Europe (AFNORTH) – Lieutenant General Sir Cecil Sugden, British Army
  - Allied Forces Central Europe (AFCENT) – Général d'Armée Jean-Étienne Valluy, French Army
    - Allied Air Forces Central Europe (AAFCE) – Air Chief Marshal Sir George Mills, Royal Air Force
    - Northern Army Group (NORTHAG) – General Sir Richard Gale, British Army
    - Central Army Group (CENTAG) – General Henry I. Hodes, United States Army
  - Allied Forces Southern Europe (AFSOUTH) – Admiral R.P.M. Bristol, United States Navy
    - Naval Striking and Support Forces Southern Europe (STRIKFORSOUTH) – Vice Admiral Charles R. Brown, United States Navy
  - Allied Forces Mediterranean (AFMED) – Admiral Sir Ralph Edwards, Royal Navy

Four exercises were conducted in the ACE area during the autumn 1952. Blue Alliance was a major allied air force exercise for the Allied Air Forces Central Europe (AAFCE) to achieve air supremacy over the Central European front and provide close air support to NORTHAG ground forces under the overall command of Lt. General Lauris Norstad, USAF. Two 1952 central region exercises involved air-ground combined forces. Equinox was a major air-ground exercise involving French-American tactical air units and a French airborne infantry unit under the command of Général d'Armée Alphonse Juin, French Army. Holdfast was a major allied air-ground exercise involving 150,000 British Army of the Rhine, Dutch, Belgian, and Canadian troops of NATO's Northern Army Group in coordination with the Allied Air Forces Central Europe. They maneuvered east of the Rhine River in the British Zone under the overall command of Lt. General Sir Richard Nelson Gale, British Army. Finally, Rosebud involved ground maneuvers by the U.S. Seventh Army in the American Zone of Occupation of Allied-occupied Germany.

The initial plans saw the defence of Western Europe from a Soviet invasion resting heavily on nuclear weapons ('Massive retaliation'), with conventional forces merely acting as a 'tripwire.' The policy enunciated in Military Committee document MC14/1, issued in December 1952, saw the defence of Germany as principally a delaying action, to allow a line of resistance to be established along the lines of the IJssel and Rhine rivers. The conventional forces would attempt to hold this line while the allied strategic air forces defeated the Soviets and their allies by destroying their economy and infrastructure.

What this strategy meant for the land battle in the central region was described for publicity purposes in January 1954 by then-Supreme Allied Commander Europe General Alfred Gruenther as:

We have... an air-ground shield which, although still not strong enough, would force an enemy to concentrate before attack. In doing so, the concentrating force would be extremely vulnerable to losses from atomic weapon attacks... We can now use atomic weapons against an aggressor, delivered not only by long-range aircraft, but also by the use of shorter-range planes, and by 280 mm. artillery... This air-ground team constitutes a very effective shield, and it would fight very well in case of attack.

In 1957, SACEUR General Lauris Norstad, USAF, noting the numerical superiority of Soviet and Warsaw Pact forces over NATO ground forces, called for "about 30" divisions to augment NATO's central European front. That year Allied Command Europe carried out Operation Counter Punch, which involved AFCENT forces on the European mainland, and two other major military exercises in September 1957. Operation Strikeback was a series of multilateral naval exercises that concentrated on NATO's eastern Atlantic/northern European flank. Operation Deep Water involved NATO carrier and amphibious assault forces operating along NATO's southern flank in the Mediterranean Sea.

To improve alliance military readiness and integration, NATO continued to hold annual alliance-wide military exercises each autumn (FALLEX) that was jointly planned and executed by SACEUR and SACLANT forces.

From 1967 however, under 'flexible response', the aim became to build up conventional forces so that, if possible, nuclear weapons might not be needed. However it was made clear that first use of nuclear weapons might be necessary if the conventional defenses were being overwhelmed. Eventually SACEUR was allocated planning control of a small number of US and British ballistic missile submarines, and some 7,000 tactical nuclear weapons were deployed in Europe.

The drawdown of the British Mediterranean Fleet, the military difficulties of the politically decided command structure, and the withdrawal of the French from the military command structure forced a rearrangement of the command arrangements in the southern region. Allied Forces Mediterranean was disbanded on 5 June 1967, and all forces in the south and the Mediterranean assigned to AFSOUTH in Naples. This left SHAPE and Allied Command Europe with three commands: AFNORTH covering Norway and Denmark, AFCENT most of Germany, and AFSOUTH Italy, Turkey, Greece, and the rest of the southern region.

===== 1970s – Haig and Rogers =====
The headquarters' new home in Mons, Belgium, was the center of international attention from time to time as new Supreme Allied Commanders came and went, with one of the more notable being General Alexander Haig. Haig, who had retired from military service in order to serve as White House Chief of Staff for President Richard Nixon during the depths of the Watergate crisis, was abruptly installed as SACEUR after Watergate's denouement. Haig arrived in 1974. Some scattered notes about his time at SHAPE are recorded by Colodny and Shachtman's book The Forty Years War. In addition, then-Lieutenant Colonel John Galvin (later to become SACEUR himself) served as speechwriter for both Goodpaster, Haig's predecessor, and Haig. Galvin wrote that 'Goodpaster was ... internationally minded, avuncular, philosophical, gentlemanly, thoughtful, warm, and measured in his ways. Haig was combative and suspicious, and conspiratorial in outlook.' While at SACEUR Haig felt that the large Warsaw Pact exercises were intimidating to observers, and, despite HQ staff disapproval, created the Exercise Autumn Forge exercise series, increasing the size of the event by holding all the NATO ACE exercises at the same time of year.

A creature of habit, Haig took the same route to SHAPE every day – a pattern of behavior that did not go unnoticed by terrorist groups. On 25 June 1979, Haig was the apparent target of an assassination attempt in Mons, Belgium. A land mine blew up under the bridge on which Haig's car was traveling, narrowly missing Haig's car, but wounding three of his bodyguards in a following car. Authorities later attributed responsibility for the attack to the German Red Army Faction.

Haig's successor, General Bernard W. Rogers, became somewhat of an institution in Europe as the former U.S. Army chief of staff occupied the office for nearly eight years; a brief outcry arose from the other NATO capitals when Rogers was slated for retirement by the U.S. administration in 1987. Rogers was replaced by General John R. Galvin after Galvin was being advised he was being picked by Secretary of Defense Caspar Weinberger in February–March 1987.

===== 1980s–1990s =====
ACE in 1986 had three major subordinate commands (MSCs), one each for Northern, Central, and Southern Europe, as well as smaller commands.

- Allied Forces Northern Europe, Kolsås, Norway
  - Allied Forces North Norway, Bodø, Norway
  - Allied Forces South Norway, Stavanger, Norway
  - Allied Forces Baltic Approaches, Karup, Denmark
    - Allied Land Forces, Schleswig-Holstein and Jutland, Rendsburg, Germany
    - Allied Land Forces, Zealand, Ringsted, Denmark
    - Allied Air Forces, Baltic Approaches, Karup, Denmark
    - Allied Naval Forces, Baltic Approaches, Karup, Denmark
- ACE Mobile Force, Seckenheim, Germany
- United Kingdom Air Forces, RAF High Wycombe, UK
- NATO Airborne Early Warning Force, HQ Maisieres, Belgium
- Allied Forces Central Europe, Brunssum, Netherlands
  - Northern Army Group (NORTHAG), JHQ Rheindahlen
  - Central Army Group (CENTAG), Campbell Barracks Heidelberg
  - Allied Air Forces Central Europe Ramstein Air Base
    - Second Allied Tactical Air Force, RAF Rheindahlen
    - Fourth Allied Tactical Air Force, Heidelberg
- Allied Forces Southern Europe, Naples, Italy
  - Allied Land Forces Southern Europe, Verona, Italy
  - Allied Land Forces South-Eastern Europe, Izmir, Turkey
  - Allied Air Forces Southern Europe, Naples, Italy
  - Naval Striking and Support Forces Southern Europe, Naples
  - Allied Naval Forces Southern Europe, Naples, Italy
    - Maritime Air Forces Mediterranean
    - Submarine Force Mediterranean
    - Naval On-Call Force Mediterranean
    - Commander Western Mediterranean
    - Commander Central Mediterranean
    - Commander Eastern Mediterranean
    - Commander Northeastern Mediterranean

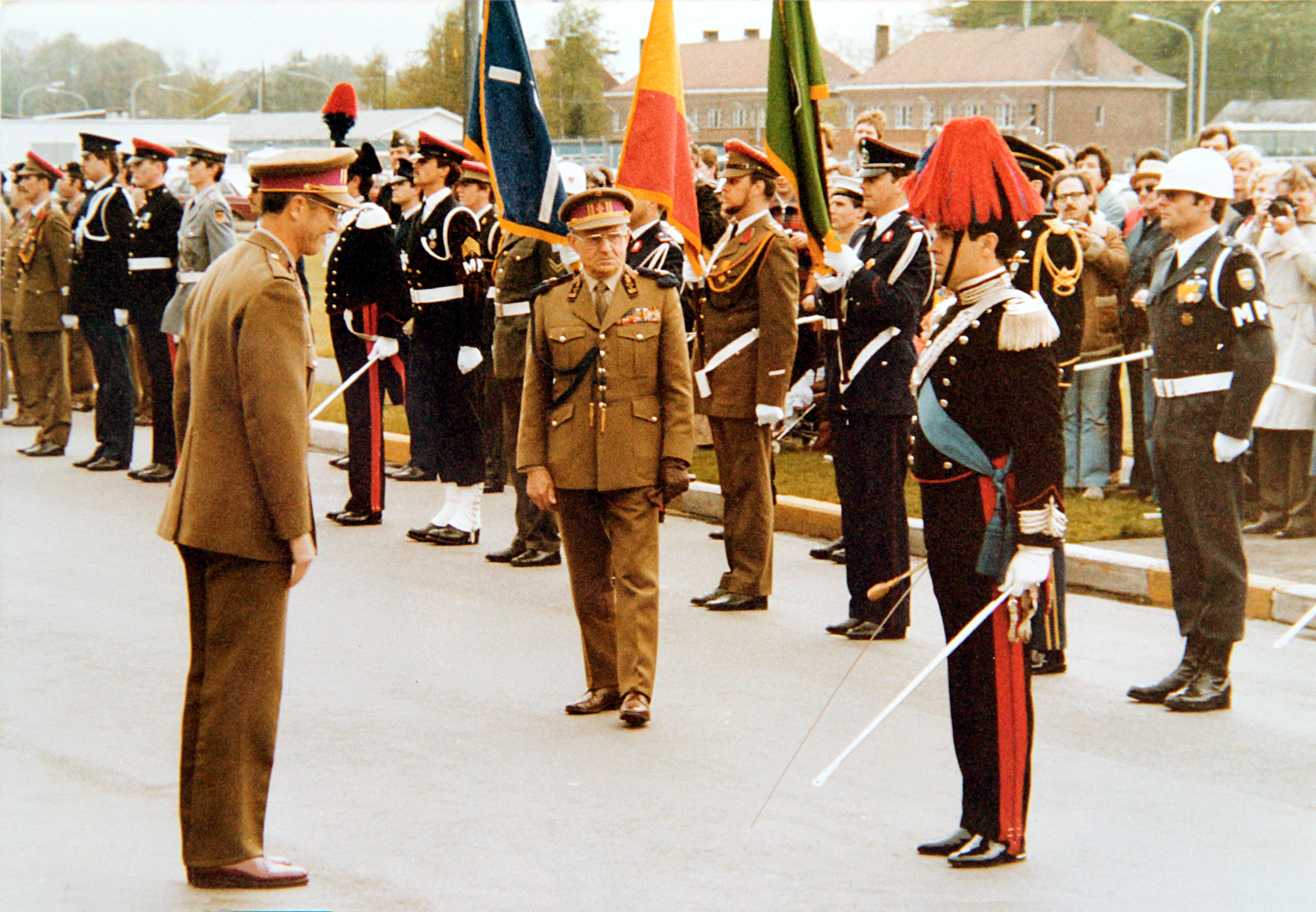
The SHAPE honor guard is presented to King Baudouin of Belgium during his visit to the Supreme Headquarters Allied Powers Europe in Maisières (Belgium) in 1981.

From 1993, the staffing of ACE was reduced in line with personnel reductions already in progress since 1990 and the Schaefer Plan, drafted by retired German general Shaefer. Shaefer's aim was to begin the first effort to streamline NATO's Cold War structure to meet the new circumstances. Personnel in the headquarters fell from 18,354 in 1990 to 12,919 in 1996. Costs fell from US$621m to $482m over the same period. From 1994-c.1999, there were three Major Subordinate Commands in ACE: Allied Forces Northwestern Europe at RAF High Wycombe, Allied Forces Central Europe at Brunssum, The Netherlands, and AFSOUTH in Naples.

After much discussion within the Alliance, ACE's three-command system was reduced to two commands covering the same area after 1996, one for north of the Alps and one for south of the Alps. The United States had wished to retain three commands, arguing that 'the span of control might be excessive.' It was feared by Pentagon officials at the time that if the two-command structure was adopted, some functions at the MSC level would have had to be moved 'downward' in the new structure. But while the United States eventually had to give in on a reduction to two commands, it was successful in that a European officer was not placed in charge of the new southern command (now Allied Joint Force Command Naples), a move which France and Germany supported. Despite French President Jacques Chirac exchanging letters with Bill Clinton personally over the issue in September–October 1997, the United States stood firm and today an American admiral remains in charge of the Naples command. In addition to the two continental commands AFNORTHWEST covered the United Kingdom and Scandinavia.

An early retirement again disrupted the Mons headquarters in 2000 as General Wesley Clark was shunted aside in favor of Air Force general Joseph Ralston. Although the move was publicly characterized as a purely administrative move necessitated by Clark's approaching retirement and the lack of an open four-star slot for the highly respected Ralston [a reality which would have compelled him to either accept a temporary demotion to two-star rank or retire from the service], Clark's relief has been often seen as a slap at the general on the part of a Pentagon leadership that had been very much at odds with him during the Kosovo war the previous spring.

From the early 2000s ACO as it became had more and more activities related to the NATO Response Force. Yet after Estonia, Latvia, and Lithuania joined the alliance, and especially after the 2008 Georgia-Russia war, more attention began to be paid to NATO's core Article 5 defence obligations. The three Baltic states' worries were specifically focused on a potential Russian threat. Thus while some exercises were ostentially run to prepare the NRF, sometimes they also included Article 5 aspects. Among these dual-purpose exercises was 'Steadfast Jazz', part of the NATO Exercise Steadfast series, which was run in November 2013 across a number of NATO countries, including Poland and the Baltic states.

==== Command structure of the majors commands of the Allied Command Europe (ACE) in 1989 ====
This is a gallery of the command structure of the majors commands of the Allied Command Europe (ACE), led by Supreme Allied Commander Europe (SACEUR), in 1989.

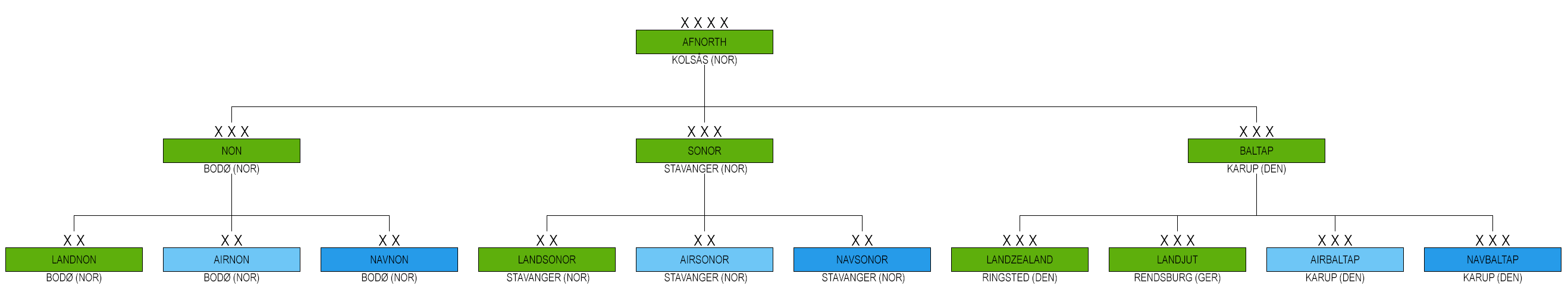
Command structure of AFNORTH in 1989 (click to enlarge)

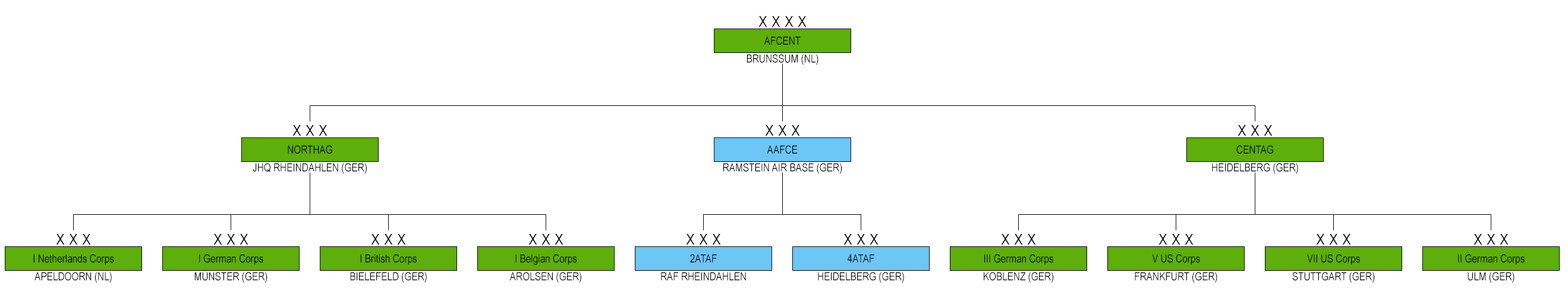
Command structure of AFCENT in 1989 (click to enlarge)

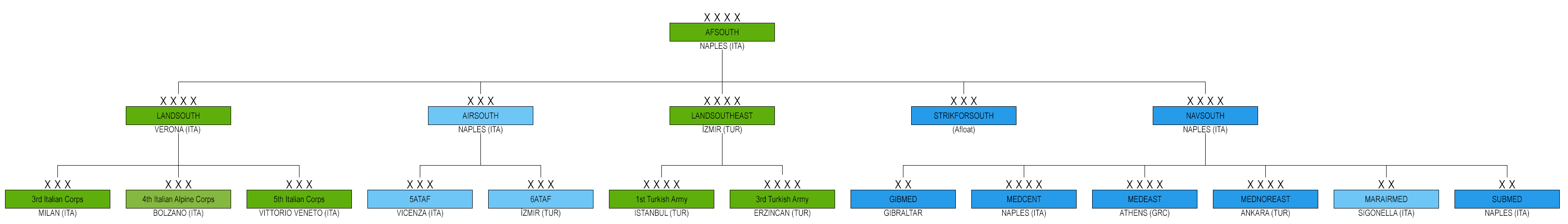
Command structure of AFSOUTH in 1989 (click to enlarge)

==== Badges of the majors commands in 1989 ====
This is a gallery of the badges of the Allied Command Europe (ACE), led by Supreme Allied Commander Europe (SACEUR), in 1989.

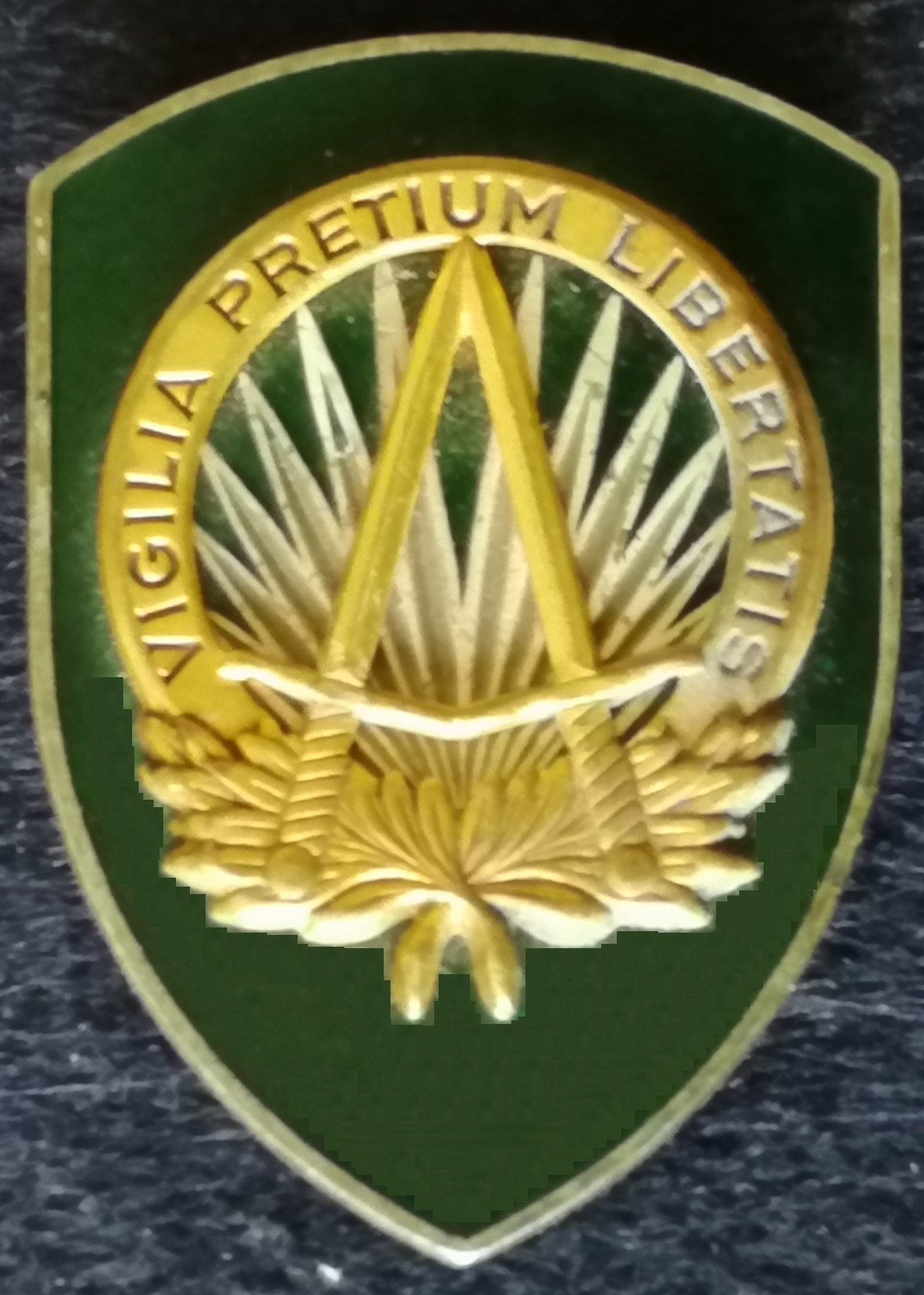
NATO SHAPE badge

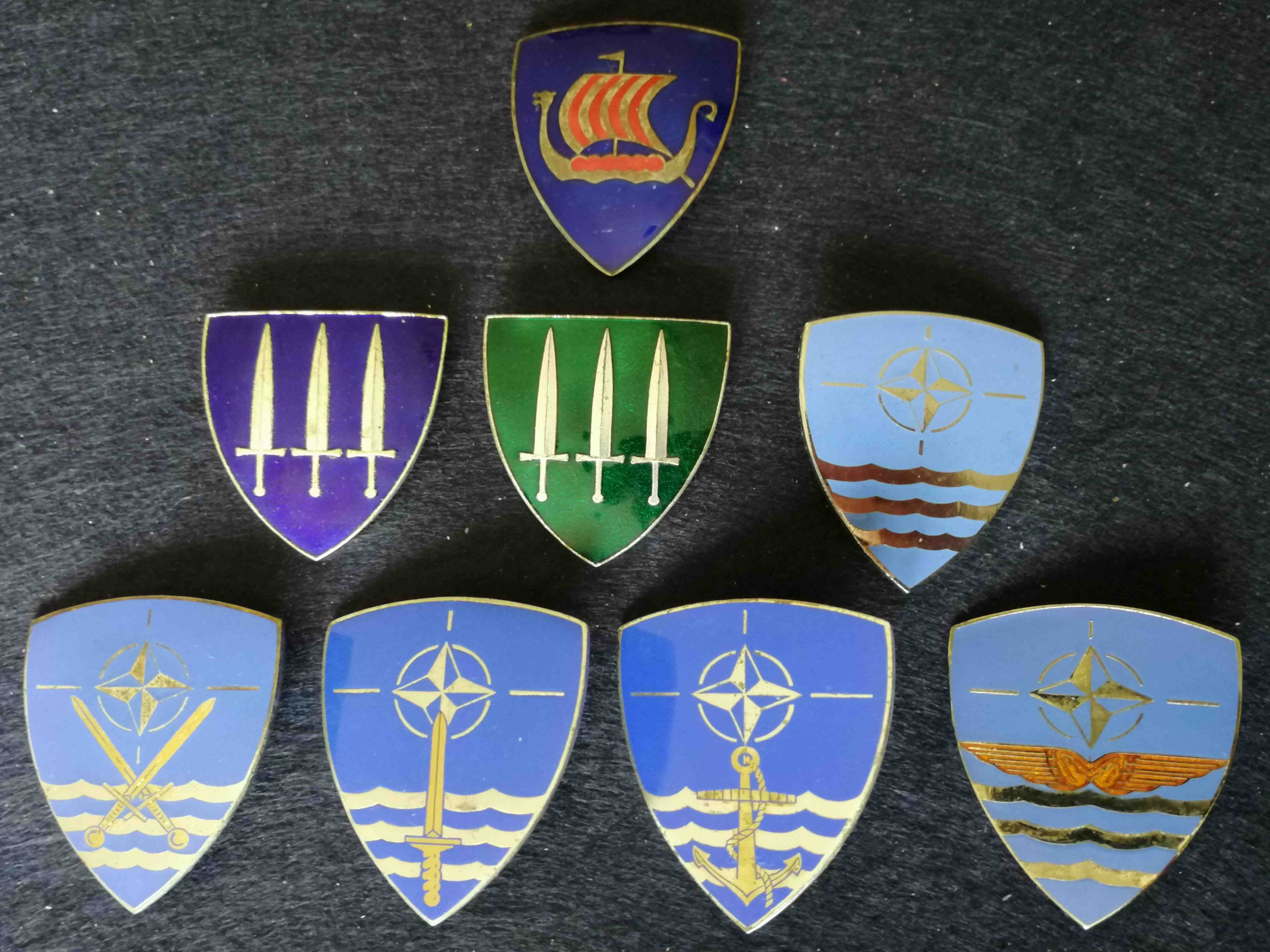
NATO Command AFNORTH badges

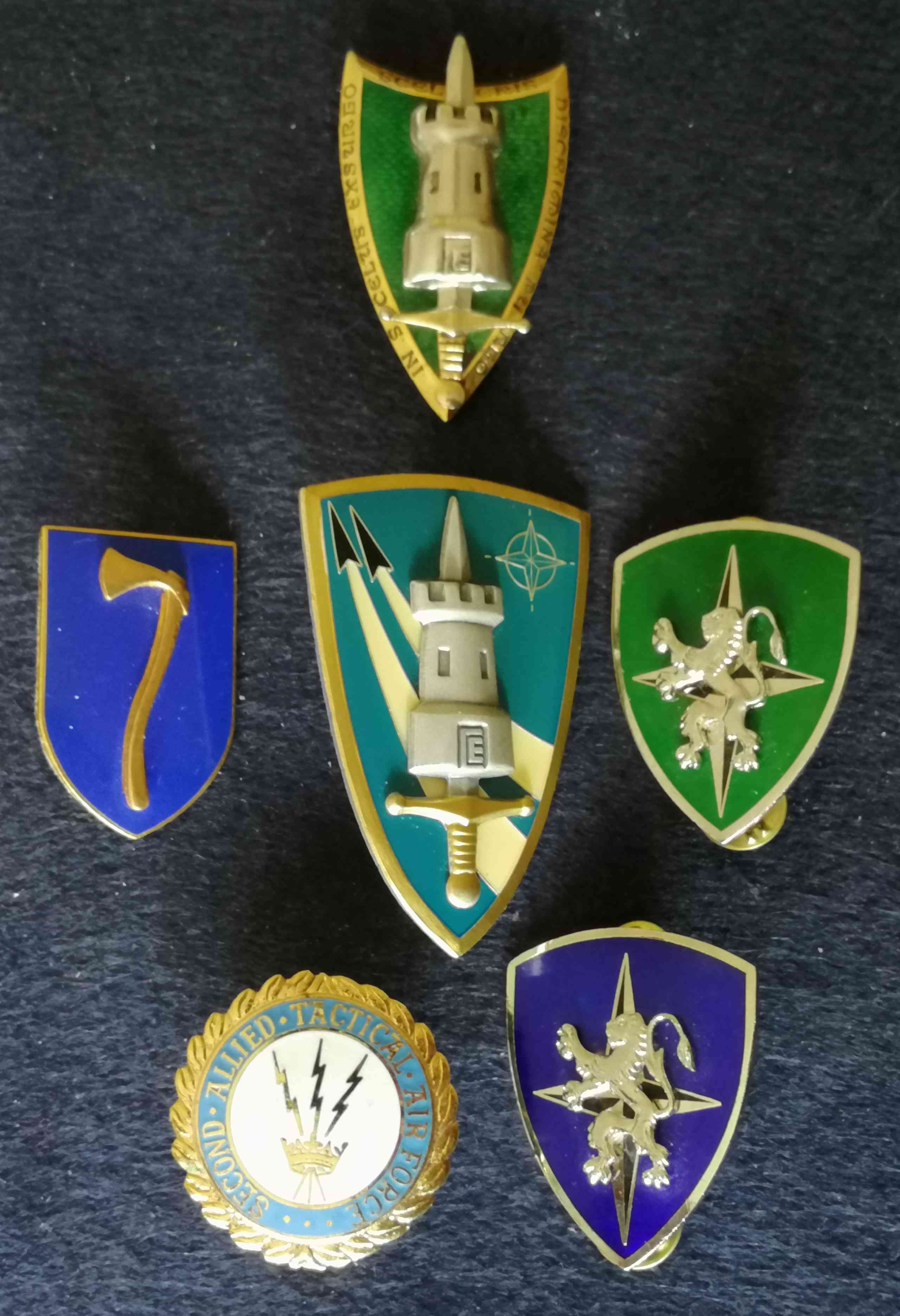
NATO Command AFCENT badges

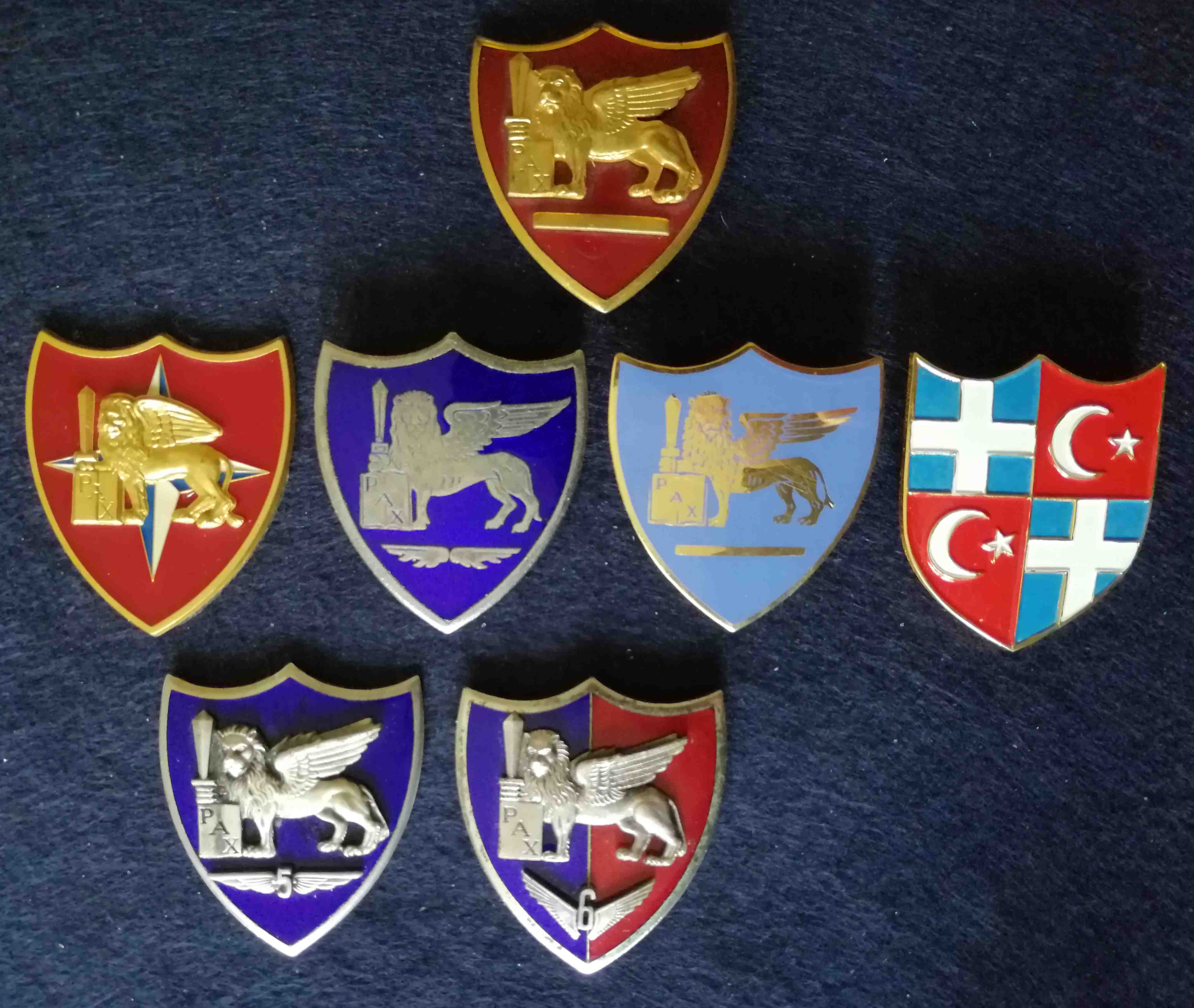
NATO Command AFSOUTH badges

==== 2003–present: Headquarters of Allied Command Operations ====
Since 2003 it has been the headquarters of Allied Command Operations, controlling all NATO operations worldwide. SHAPE retained its traditional name with reference to Europe for legal reasons although the geographical scope of its activities was extended in 2003. At that time, NATO's command in Lisbon, historically part of Allied Command Atlantic, was reassigned to ACO.

In 2003, a French flag was set up in the SHAPE headquarters in Mons following the return, after almost forty years, of French military officers to the HQ. Fifteen French military officers, including General Jean-Jacques Bart, work there, of a total number of 1,100 personnel. They are however considered as "inserted," and not as "integrated," as they cannot be ordered to move without previous French approval.

A new structure was developed with three main headquarters under Allied Command Operations:

- Allied Joint Force Command Brunssum, Netherlands
  - Component Command – Air, Ramstein
  - Component Command – Maritime, Northwood
  - Command Component – Land, Heidelberg
- Allied Joint Force Command Lisbon, Portugal
- Allied Joint Force Command Naples, Italy
  - Component Command – Air, Izmir
  - Component Command – Maritime, Naples
  - Component Command – Land, Madrid

NATO Rapid Deployable Corps headquarters (NRDC)

Between 2003 and 2006, a new category of forces was created, principally to improve the flexibility and reach of land forces. The structure incorporated six "NATO Rapid Deployable Corps headquarters". Formed from October 2003, the NATO Rapidly Deployable Corps are designated High Readiness Forces (HRF), designed to be able to react on short notice. Although these forces cannot deploy on five days warning like the NATO Response Force (NRF), they have a longer sustainment capability in combat than the NRF, which is limited to 30 days. As of 2025, there are nine NATO-assigned corps, two of which have regional tasks:

- Allied Command Operations (ACO), in Mons (Belgium)
  - Allied Rapid Reaction Corps (ARRC), in Innsworth (United Kingdom)
  - Rapid Reaction Corps – France (RRC-FR), in Lille (France)
  - 1 German-Netherlands Corps (1GNC), in Münster (Germany)
  - NATO Rapid Deployable Corps – Spain (NRDC-SP), in Bétera (Spain)
  - NATO Rapid Deployable Corps – Türkiye (NRDC-T), in Istanbul (Turkey)
  - NATO Rapid Deployable Corps – Greece (NRDC-GR), in Thessaloniki (Greece)
  - NATO Rapid Deployable Corps – Italy (NRDC-IT), in Solbiate Olona (Italy)
    - Multinational Division South (MND-S), in Florence (Italy)
  - Allied Joint Force Command Brunssum (JFC Brunssum), in Brunssum (Netherlands)
    - Multinational Corps Northeast (MNC-NE), in Szczecin (Poland)
      - Multinational Division North (MND-N), in Ādaži (Latvia)
      - Multinational Division North East (MND-NE), in Elbląg (Poland)
  - Allied Joint Force Command Naples (JFC Naples), in Naples (Italy)
    - Multinational Corps Southeast (MNC-SE), in Sibiu [Romania)
      - Multinational Division South East (MND-SW), in Bucharest (Romania)

Certification of the following High Readiness Forces (Maritime) Headquarters took place in 2004:

- Headquarters Commander Italian Maritime Forces on board Italy's INS Garibaldi;
- Headquarters Commander Spanish Maritime Forces (HQ COMSPMARFOR) on board SPS Castilla;
- Headquarters Commander United Kingdom Maritime Forces (HQ COMUKMARFOR)

Naval Striking and Support Forces NATO (STRIKFORNATO), homeported at Gaeta, Italy, whose lead nation is the United States, is commanded by Commander United States Sixth Fleet, and is also part of the NATO Force Structure. STRIKFORNATO is the only command capable of leading an expanded maritime task force.

The final formation is Commander French Maritime Forces, initially aboard the Charles de Gaulle, but now aboard the amphibious ship Mistral. The French naval component is drawn from the Force d'Action Navale, the French Navy's surface fleet.

Island Commander, Iceland, remains in existence as a detachment of HQ ACO, as does Allied Submarine Command, a NATO command based on the United States Navy's ComSubLant. A special operations coordination centre and an intelligence fusion centre have also recently been formed within SHAPE.

As more capable rapid reaction forces were established, earlier 'fire brigades', including the ACE Mobile Force (Land) ('AMF (L)'), were disbanded; AMF(L) was disbanded on 30 October 2002.

In addition to this Allied Command Operations has at its disposal standing forces such as:

- NATO Airborne Early Warning Force (NAEWF)
- Standing NATO Maritime Group 1 (SNMG1)
- Standing NATO Maritime Group 2 (SNMG2)
- Standing NATO Mine Countermeasures Group 1 (SNMCMG1)
- Standing NATO Mine Countermeasures Group 2 (SNMCMG2)

Airlift support for SACEUR's travels is provided by the USAF's 309th Airlift Squadron at Chièvres Air Base, Belgium.

In 2012 and 2013, NATO underwent a reorganization of the military command, and the land component commands at Heidelberg and Madrid were deactivated, the maritime component command at Naples was closed and the air component command at Izmir also shut down.

In 2026, a Canadian woman working as an intern at SHAPE was arrested for espionage after a search of her home and workplace.

== Present role ==
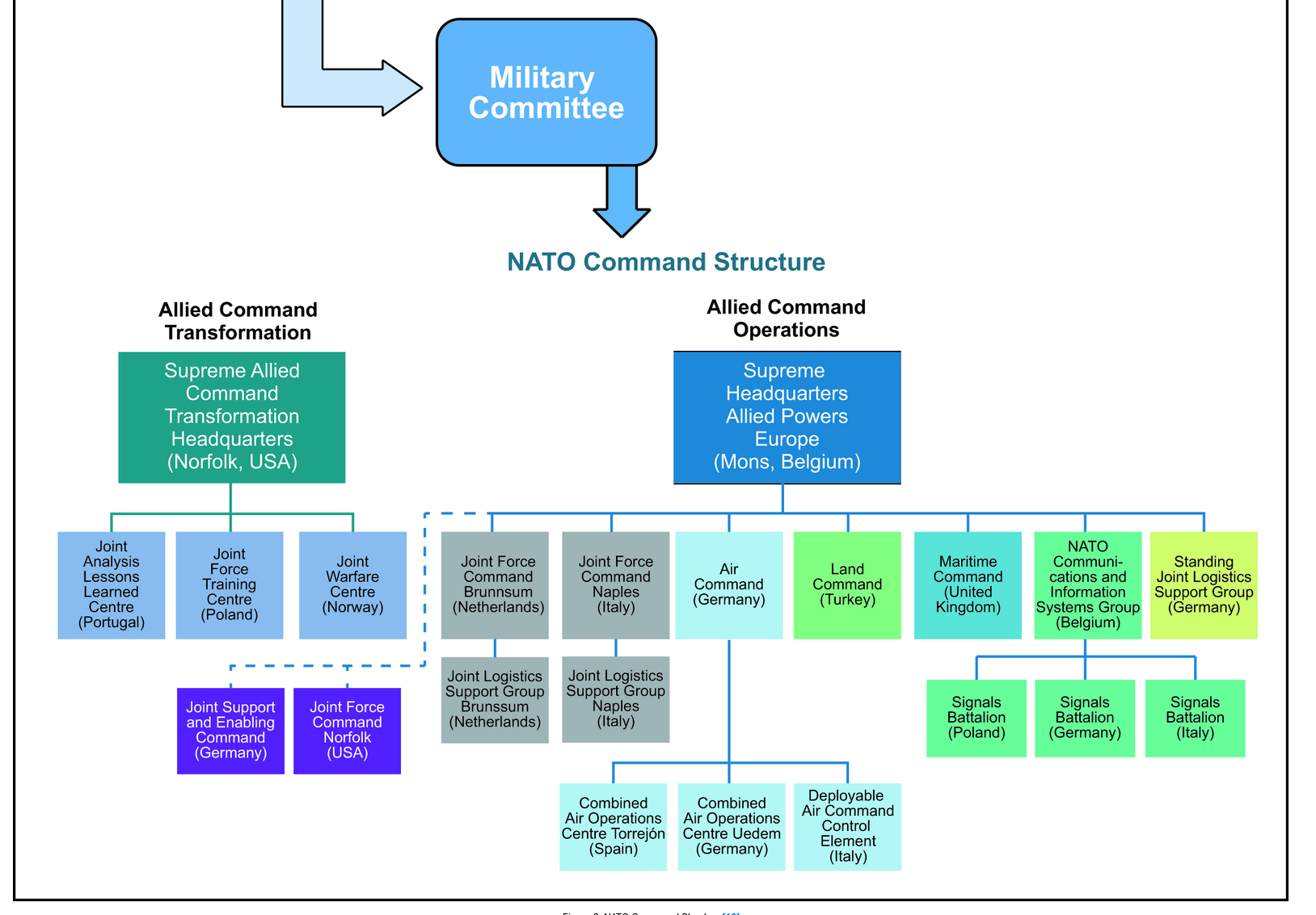
NATO Command Structure (2020–2021)

Since 1951, the Supreme Allied Commander Europe has served as the head of the topmost-level NATO command for Europe, now titled Allied Command Operations, and located at Casteau. The Deputy Commander is always a European officer.

There were initially two joint force operational headquarters and several single service commands under SHAPE, in its role as headquarters of Allied Command Operations:

- Allied Joint Force Command Brunssum (JFC BS), Netherlands
- Allied Joint Force Command Naples (JFC NP), Italy

In 2018, it was agreed that a new joint force operational headquarters in Norfolk would be created to conduct operations in the Atlantic. Joint Force Command Norfolk (JFC NF) was established due to the rising Russian threat, making the Atlantic sea routes more critical. A Joint Support and Enabling Command (JSEC) was also created in Ulm, Germany, to improve rear area logistical support.

There are three single-service commands:

- Allied Air Command (AIRCOM) at Ramstein, Germany
- Allied Land Command (LANDCOM) at Izmir, Turkey
- Allied Maritime Command (MARCOM) at Northwood Headquarters, London, United Kingdom

Other commands include:

- Naval Striking and Support Forces NATO (aka. Strike Force NATO, STRIKFORNATO) at Oeiras, Portugal
- Joint Support and Enabling Command, Ulm (announced 2018, operational September 2019)
- NATO Communications and Information Systems Services Agency (NCISG) at Mons, Belgium

== Role in European Union missions ==
Under the 2002 Berlin Plus agreement, SHAPE may also take part in the European Union's (EU) command and control structure as an operational headquarters (OHQ) for EU missions. In such an instance, the Deputy Supreme Allied Commander Europe (DSACEUR), who is always a European, would serve as Operation Commander (OpCdr). This use of SHAPE by the EU is however subject to a "right of first refusal", i.e. NATO must first decline to intervene in a given crisis.

The European Union Military Staff maintains a 'cell' at SHAPE.

== In popular culture ==
Ian Fleming referenced SHAPE in his short-story 'From a View to a Kill', collected as part of For Your Eyes Only.

In the film Private Benjamin, Goldie Hawn's character negotiates an assignment to SHAPE.

== Symbols ==
=== Coat of arms ===
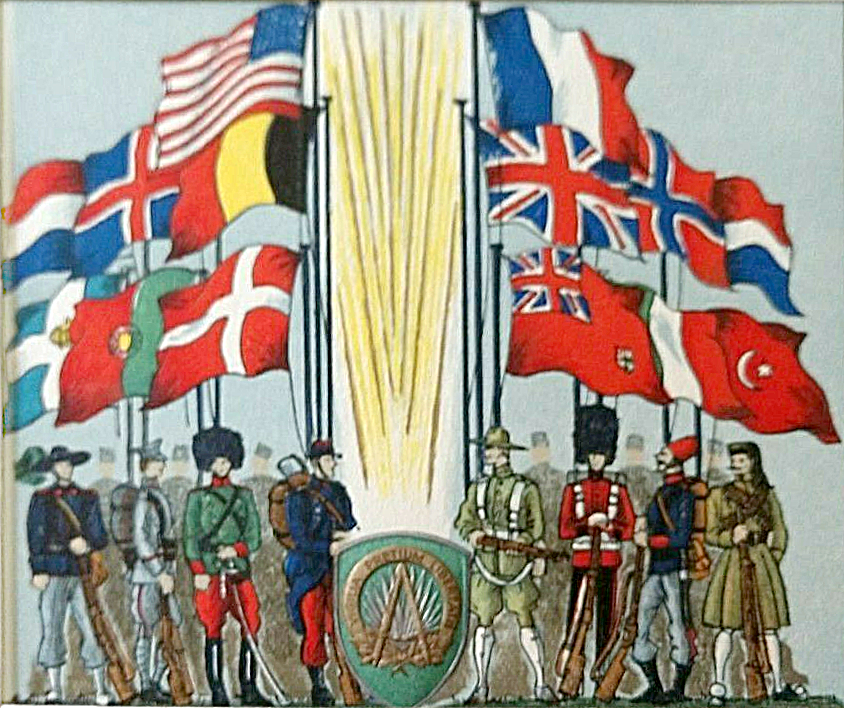
Christmas card, c. 1952–1955, depicting an alternative achievement in which both national flags and soldiers in traditional uniforms support SHAPE's escutcheon upon a compartment

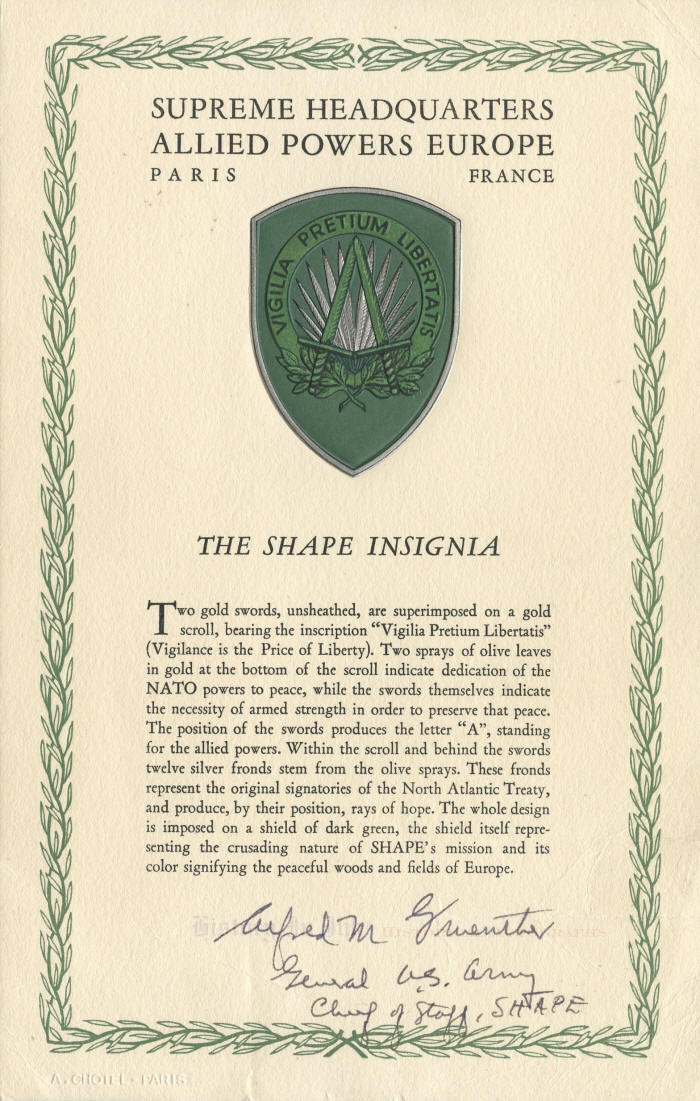
1953 brochure, signed by then Supreme Commander Alfred Gruenther

SHAPE Technical Centre (1955–1996)

A 1953 brochure on the arms reads:

Two gold swords, unsheathed, are superimposed on a gold scroll bearing the inscription "Vigilia pretium libertatis" (Vigilance is the Price of Liberty). Two sprays of olive leaves in gold at the bottom of the scroll indicate dedication of the NATO nations to peace, the swords show the armed strength necessary to preserve the peace. The position of the swords produces the letter "A", standing for the allied powers. Within the scroll, and behind the swords, are twelve silver fronds stemming from the olive sprays and denoting the original signatories of the North Atlantic Treaty. They produce by their position rays of hope. The whole design is superimposed on a shield of dark green. The shield represents the crusading nature of SHAPE's mission and its colour signifies the peaceful woods and fields of Europe.

==== Achievement ====
The full achievement is composed of the arms as well as member states' flags, serving as supporters. The number of supporters has risen steadily, reflecting NATO enlargement. An exception happened in 1966, with the withdrawal of France from NATO's integrated command structure.

Period	Achievement	Change of membership
1951–1952	?	Formation of SHAPE
1952–1955	?	Accession of Greece and Turkey
1955–1966	?	Accession of West Germany
1966–1982		Secession of France
1982–1999		Accession of Spain
1999–2004		Accession of the Czech Republic, Hungary and Poland
2004–2009		Accession of Bulgaria, Estonia, Latvia, Lithuania, Romania, Slovakia and Slovenia Reentry of France
2009–2017		Accession of Albania, Croatia and the reentry of France
2017–2020		Accession of Montenegro
2020–2023		Accession of North Macedonia
2023–2024		Accession of Finland
2024–present		Accession of Sweden

=== Standards ===
SHAPE standard

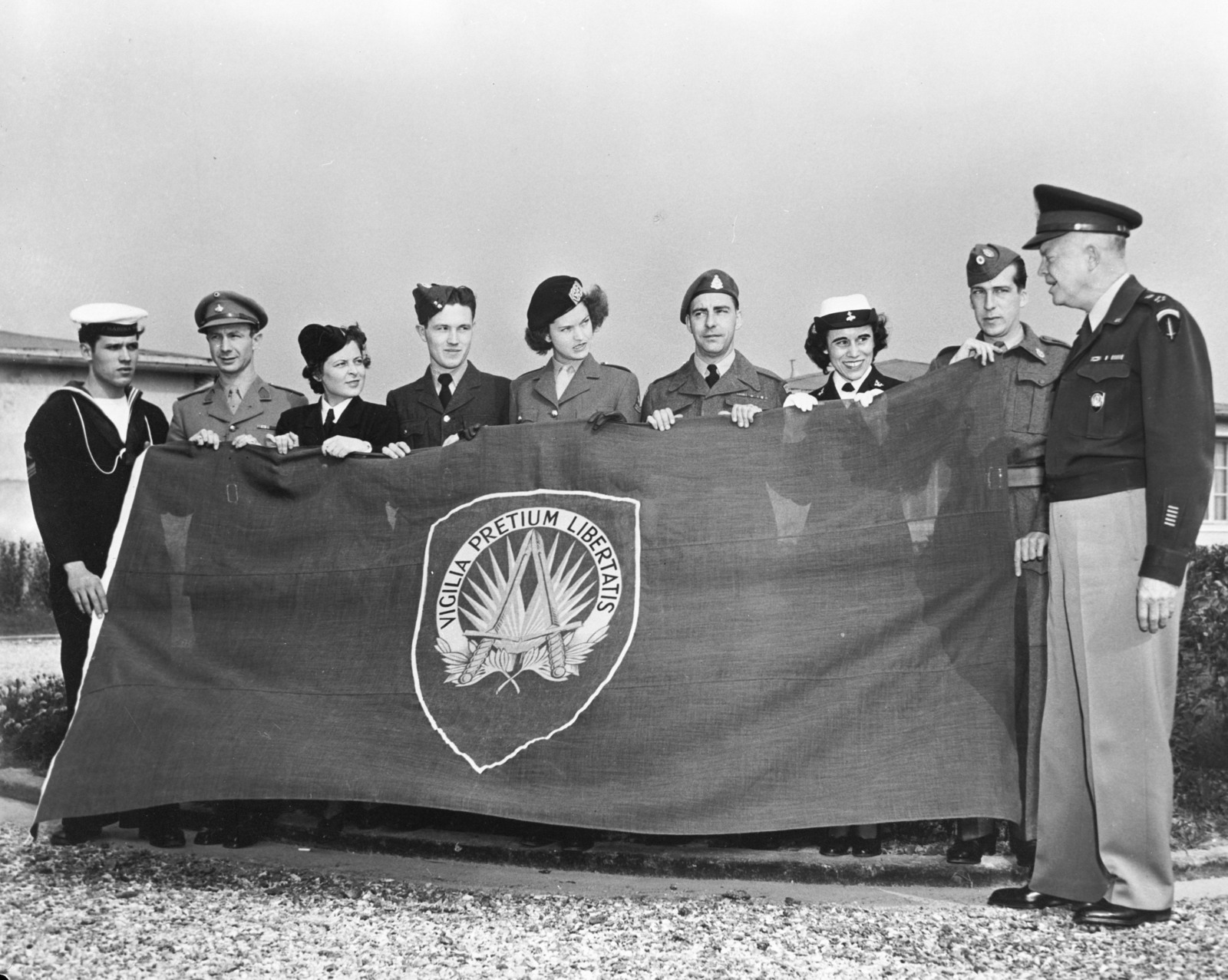
Gen. Dwight Eisenhower in front of the standard, 8 October 1951

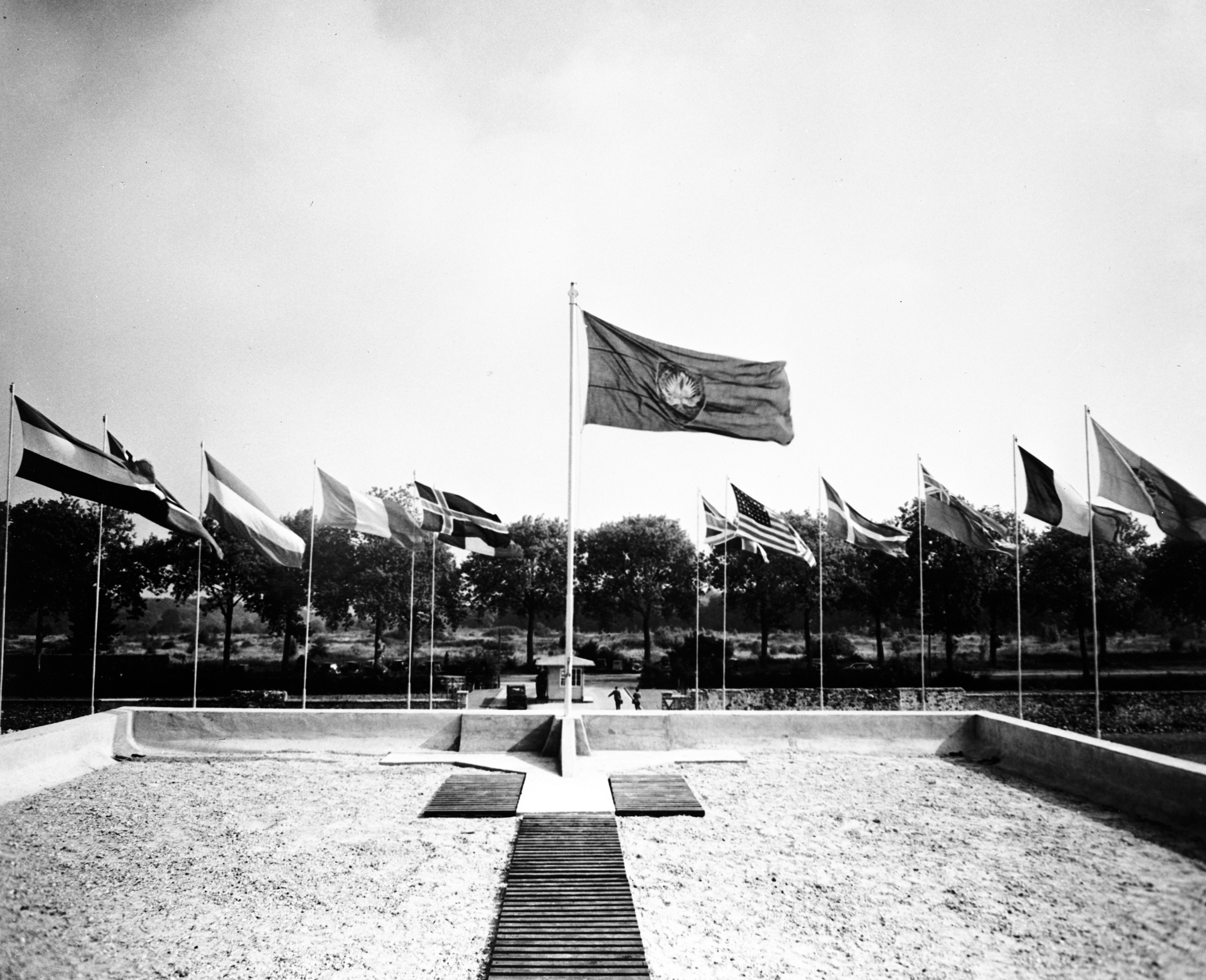
Standard flown at SHAPE in Rocquencourt, France
SACEUR standard

SACEUR standard

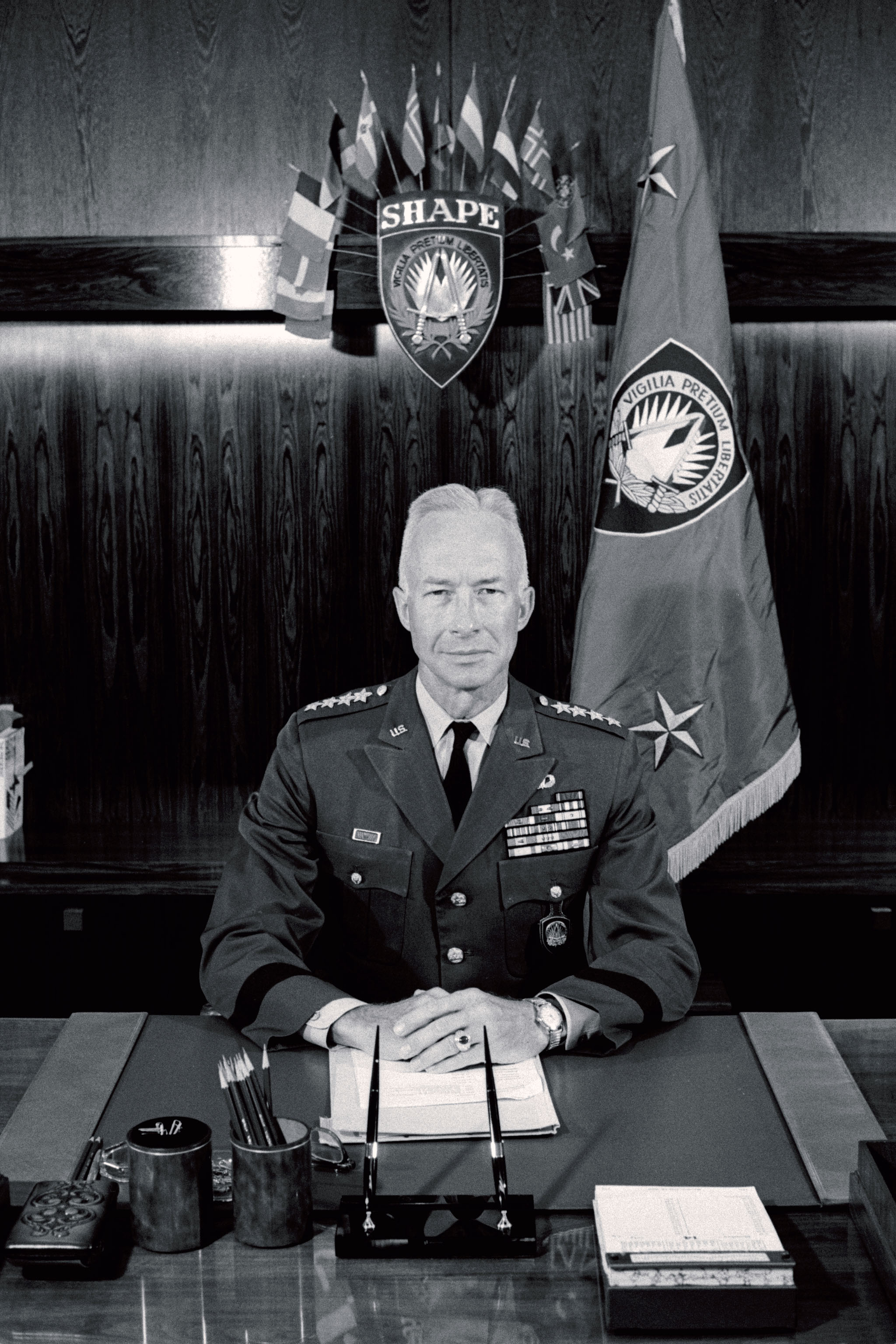
SACEUR standard displayed behind Andrew Goodpaster

== See also ==
- Operational headquarters of the European Union
- Berlin Plus agreement
- NATO Special Operations Headquarters (NSHQ)
