= Daddario =

D'addario or Daddario is a surname and may refer to:

- Alessandro D'Addario (born 1997), Sammarinese soccer-player
- Brian and Michael D'Addario, American musicians in The Lemon Twigs
- Emilio Q. Daddario (1918–2010), American politician, father of Richard, grandfather of Alexandra
  - Alexandra Daddario (born 1986), American actress and model
  - Matthew Daddario (born 1987), American actor, brother of Alexandra
- Gary D'Addario, American retired police commander, television technical advisor, and actor
- Lorenzo D'Addario (born 1964), Italian general
- Ray D'Addario (1920–2011), American photographer
- D'Addario, a manufacturer of musical instrument strings and accessories
- D'Addario Industries, a business group in Connecticut

== See also ==
- Addario
