= Lorenzo D'Addario =

Lorenzo D’Addario
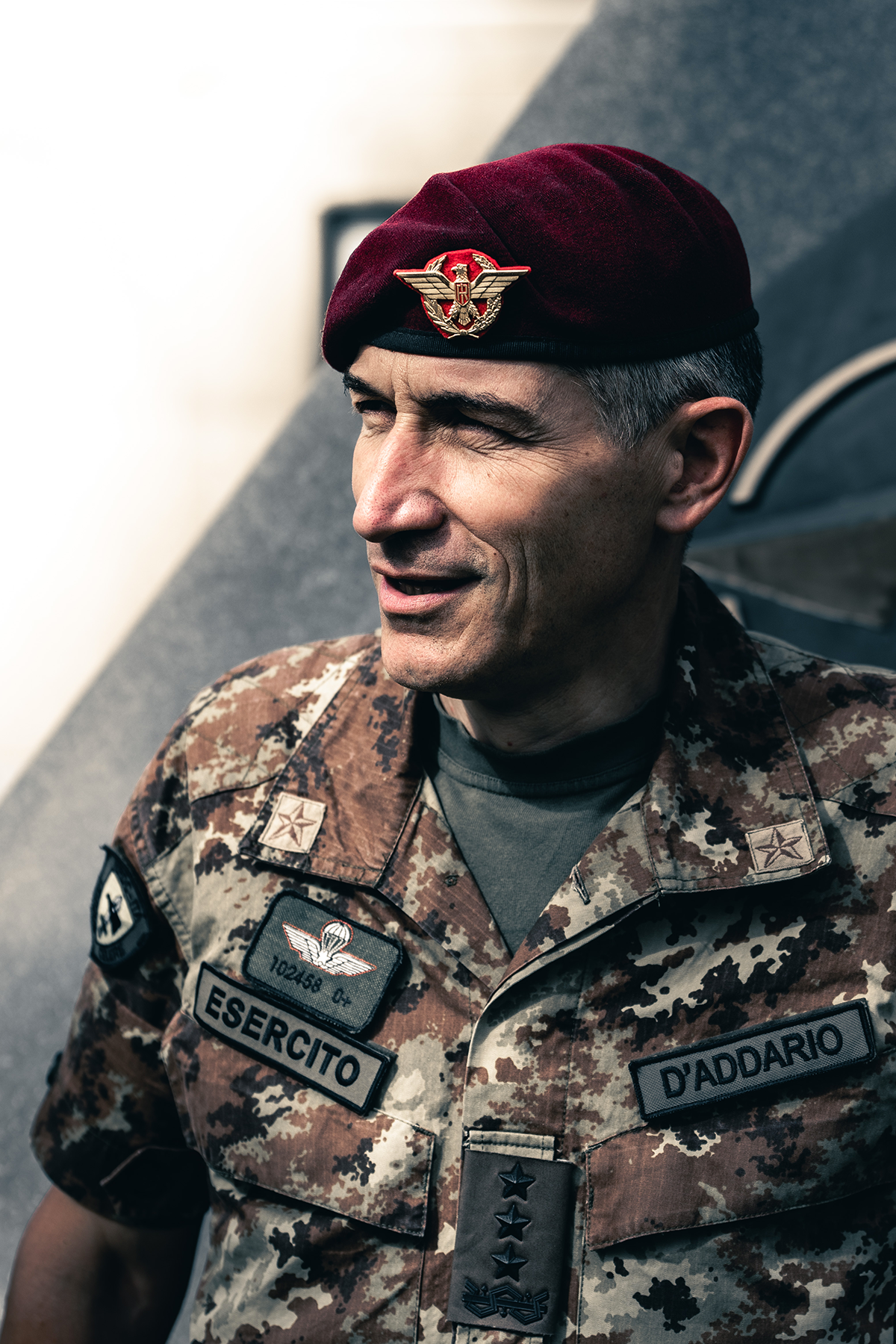
- Born: 1964 (age 61–62); Florence, Italy
- Military career
- Allegiance: Italy
- Branch: Army
- Rank: Lieutenant General
- Commands: Kosovo Force; Folgore Brigade

Lieutenant General Lorenzo D’Addario (born 1964) is a member of the Italian Armed Forces, 23rd Commander of the Kosovo Force and at present Commander of NATO Rapid Deployable Corps - Italy and of the new Allied Reaction Force (ARF).

== Military career ==
Lt. Gen. D’Addario entered the Nunziatella Military School in Naples in 1980 and was later admitted to the Military Academy of Modena in 1983. Assigned to the Folgore Brigade, the Airborne formation of the Italian Army, he held NATO Staff appointments in Italy, at the NATO Rapid Deployable Corps - Italy (NRDC-ITA), in Great Britain and in the United States. He served in the Italian Armed Forces Defence General Staff and the Italian Army General Staff. He is a graduate of the British Joint Services Command and Staff College.

He commanded 5th 'El Alamein' Parachute Battalion, 186th Parachute Regiment and the Folgore Brigade.

He deployed to Operation Provide Comfort in Iraq, Operation Vespri Siciliani in Palermo, United Nations Operation in Somalia II (UNOSOM II), NATO Operation International Security Assistance Force (ISAF) in Afghanistan. He served three tours in Kosovo with the Kosovo Force, to become its 23rd Commander on 28 November 2018, until 19 November 2019.

He served as Deputy Commander of the Allied Rapid Reaction Corps in the United Kingdom from April 2020 to March 2022. On 18 May 2022 he took Command of NRDC-ITA.
