= NATO Response Force =

High-readiness NATO rapid deployment force

- NRF emblem
- Active: 2003–2024
- Allegiance: (NATO) North Atlantic Treaty Organization
- Type: Rapid multi-national deployment force
- Size: 500,000
- Part of: Supreme Headquarters Allied Powers Europe
- Headquarters: JFC Brunssum, Netherlands; JFC Naples, Italy (annual rotation)
- Website: Official website

The NATO Response Force (NRF) was a high-readiness North Atlantic Treaty Organization (NATO) rapid multi-national deployment force comprising army, navy, air force, special forces, and special operations-capable forces units capable of being deployed quickly within short notice. The NRF comprises more than 500,000 troops. Its forces included units from several non-NATO member partners, including Ukraine (since 2014), and Georgia (since 2015).

The NRF was formed in June 2003 per endorsements at the 2002 Prague summit. Units assigned to the NRF were only used for disaster relief and security until February 2022, when it was activated for the first time in response to the Russian invasion of Ukraine. In 2024, it was replaced by Allied Reaction Force (ARF).

== Structure ==
The NRF structure consisted of four parts:

- Command and Control element: Based on a deployable Joint Task Force HQ. On 1 January 2022, the French Rapid Reaction Corps (CRR-FRA) assumed command of the NRF land component.
- Very High Readiness Joint Task Force (VJTF): High-readiness "spearhead force" that can deploy wherever needed at short notice.
- Initial Follow On Forces Group (IFFG): High-readiness forces that can deploy following the VJTF in response to a crisis.
- Response Forces Pool (RFP): A broad spectrum of military capabilities encompassing command and control, combat forces, and support units, drawn from the national forces of NATO members and non-member allies.

Rotating forces through the NRF required nations to meet the demanding standards needed for collective defense and expeditionary operations. As its standards were very high, participation in the NRF is preceded by a six-month NATO exercise program to integrate and standardize the various national contingents. Generally, nations carried out a pre-training period in preparation for the NATO exercises, lasting between 6–18 months. Obtaining NATO certification to lead the force's components required meeting 50 core criteria, divided into 375 sub-criteria. Once activated, Reconnaissance Teams deployed within 5 days. This was the first of a number of deployment phases that lead to the deployment of the entire HQ Joint Task Force and Immediate Reaction Forces within 30 days.

The NRF trained for various tasks, including:

- Acting as the rapid initial force deployment as a precursor to deployment of a much larger force
- Counterterrorism
- Crisis management
- Disaster relief
- Irregular warfare in support of an alliance nations or for security reasons if there is a risk of invasion
- Maritime interdiction
- Maritime security in the alliance nations
- Protection of critical infrastructures
- Providing immediate collective defence of Alliance members in the event of an Article V operations
- Support peacekeeping

== History ==
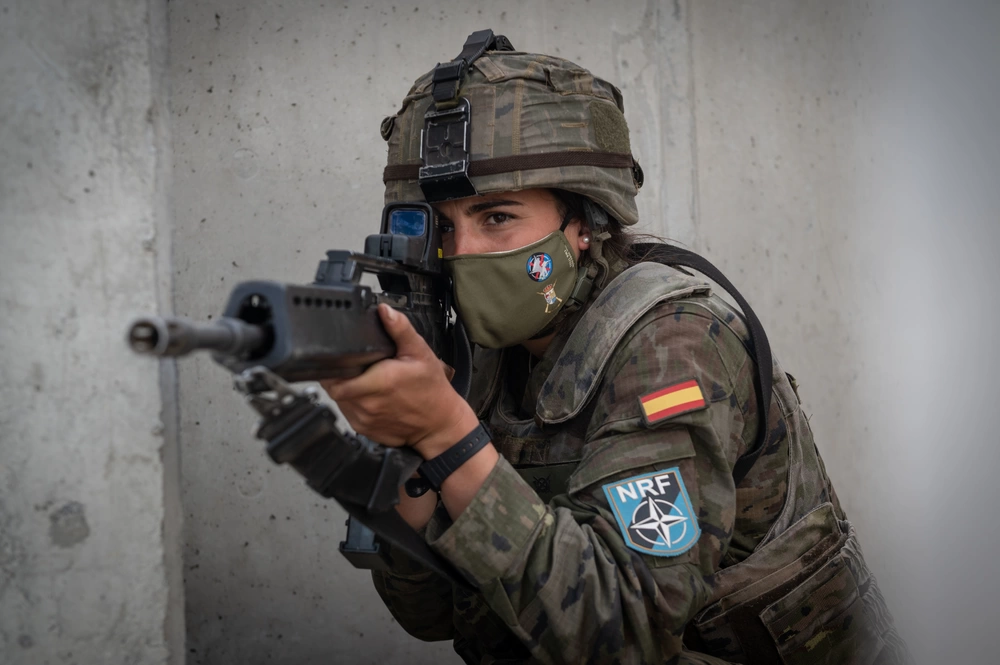
Spanish NRF soldier during a NATO FTX in Romania, May 2021

=== Creation and early years ===
The NRF concept was first endorsed with a declaration of NATO's Heads of State at the Prague Summit on 22 November 2002 and approved by NATO Defence Ministers in June 2003. Dual headquarters were created in Naples, Italy and Brunssum, Netherlands; command rotates annually between them. On 15 October 2003, the first actual rotation of NRF began with around 9,500 troops. In 2004 and 2005, NRF units were activated for a small number of civilian missions, including to provide security at the 2004 Summer Olympics in Athens and the Afghan presidential elections, as well as to provide humanitarian assistance in the United States after Hurricane Katrina and in Pakistan after the 2005 Kashmir earthquake. Due to equipment shortages, unfulfilled troop commitments and falling political support among member countries, the size of the NRF was cut in half in 2007 and not used again until 2022. The French Navy entered the NRF rotation system for the first time in January 2007, taking command of the force's amphibious component under Spanish overall naval command. During the 2014 Wales summit following the annexation of Crimea by the Russian Federation, NATO leaders agreed to reorganize the NRF's core troops into a "spearhead force" known as a "Very High Readiness Joint Task Force" (VJTF) designed to be able to deploy at 48 hours notice, although the actual level of readiness was generally several weeks. It was also for the first time linked explicitly to NATO's Article 5 obligations. Altogether, it amounted to around 30,000 troops.

For most of its existence, the lack of enthusiasm of NATO's member states for the NRF resulted in chronic equipment and personnel shortages. It was sometimes branded a wasteful failure and an insignificant force next to NATO's more established units. Nevertheless, some military scholars argue that it played a significant role in modernizing European militaries as their troops rotated through it.

=== Russo-Ukrainian War ===
As Russian troops built up around Ukraine in early 2022, various units attached to the NRF were alerted or deployed. On 11 February 2022, a U.S. Army brigade combat team of about 4,700 troops from the 82nd Airborne Division was ordered to Poland, while a Stryker squadron (battalion-sized cavalry unit) was sent from Vilseck's Rose Barracks to Romania. On 11 February 2022, F-35A squadrons of the 388th and 419th Fighter Wings deployed from the U.S. to patrol NATO's eastern flank.

On 16 February 2022, 8,500 troops in some of the units that make up the U.S. contribution to the NRF were put on alert for possible rotational deployment to EUCOM's area of responsibility. By 25 February 2022, 7,000 troops from this force, including the 1st Armored Brigade Combat Team, 3rd Infantry Division — 4700 troops, plus support units), were deployed to Germany. This marked the first time in decades that three U.S. heavy brigades deployed to EUCOM concurrently (the 1st Brigade of the 3rd ID, the 1st Brigade, 1st ID, and an Initial Brigade Combat Team of the 82nd Airborne Division, all to be deployed as needed for the situation). Two forward-deployed headquarters, one from V Corps (United States), and the capability for one from XVIII Airborne Corps, were positioned in Poznan, Poland, and Wiesbaden, Germany respectively, should any further need arise for a proportionate response to a threat to the member states of NATO.

After a NATO meeting on 25 February 2022, NATO Secretary-General Jens Stoltenberg stated that the NATO leadership had agreed to deploy part of the NRF to alliance members in Eastern Europe. Stoltenberg said that the Very High Readiness Joint Task Force, currently led by France, would be among the units sent. This was the first time the NRF had been activated for a military mission. In light of the Russian invasion of Ukraine, the NATO Response Force can activate up to 40,000 troops. Eight of NATO's thirty member nations have triggered urgent consultations under Article 4 of the NATO Washington Treaty. In advance of the 2022 Madrid summit, Jens Stoltenberg announced the plan to increase the NRF size to more than 300,000 troops, which was approved during the summit. This has since grown to over 500,000. Macron affirmed that France would deploy around 1,000 troops to Romania, and enhance its presence in Estonia with an additional 200 troops to support Operation Lynx.

== See also ==
- Anglo-French Combined Joint Expeditionary Force
- Eurocorps
- Franco-German Brigade
- Joint Expeditionary Force
