= Multinational Division South =

Italian army division

Multinational Division South (MND-S)
- Coat of Arms of the Multinational Division South
- Active: 31 Dec. 2002 - present
- Country: Multinational HQ
- Part of: Operational Land Forces Command
- Garrison/HQ: Florence, "Alessandro Predieri" Barracks
- Motto: "VICTORIA NOBIS VITA" (from latin: Victory is our life)

Commanders
- Current commander: Major General Giuseppe Scuderi

The Multinational Division South (MND-S) is an Italian Army NATO-assigned deployable division headquarters. The division is based in Florence in Tuscany and assigned to the Operational Land Forces Command. Originally the division was named Division "Vittorio Veneto" (Italian: Divisione "Vittorio Veneto") and carried the name and traditions of the Cold War Armored Brigade "Vittorio Veneto". Brigade and division were named for the decisive Italian World War I victory in the Battle of Vittorio Veneto.

On 15 June 2025, the division became a multinational, NATO-assigned deployable division headquarters and was renamed Multinational Division South (MND-S). On 1 July 2025, the division was assigned, as Land Component Command of NATO'S Allied Reaction Force (ARF) to the NATO Rapid Deployable Corps – Italy. Italy contributes approximately 70% of the division's personnel, with remaining the personnel coming from eleven other NATO members: Albania, Croatia, France,Greece, Hungary, Poland, Portugal, Romania, Slovenia, Spain, Turkey and United Kingdom. From 21 August 2025, the division's commander is Major General Giuseppe Scuderi.

== History ==
=== Division "Vittorio Veneto" ===
In 2002, the Italian Army formed three division commands, with one of the three always readily deployable for NATO missions. Each of the three divisions was given the name and traditions of a division that served with distinction during World War II. Consequently, on 31 December 2002, the 2nd Italian Division based in Vittorio Veneto was renamed "Mantova" Division.

In the 2013, the Italian Army underwent a structural reform, which included the plan to merge the Airmobile Brigade "Friuli" with the Cavalry Brigade "Pozzuolo del Friuli" into an air assault brigade carrying the name of the latter unit. As the Airmobile Brigade "Friuli" carried the name and traditions of the 20th Infantry Division "Friuli" and Combat Group "Friuli", which had both served with distinction on the allied side during the Italian campaign of World War II, the Italian Army decided to retain the name by renamed the Division Command "Mantova". On 16 July 2013, the Division Command "Mantova" moved from Vittorio Veneto to Florence, where the command was renamed Division "Friuli".

However, due to the 2014 Russian invasion of Ukraine the Italian Army's reform plans were reversed and the merger of the Airmobile Brigade "Friuli" and Cavalry Brigade "Pozzuolo del Friuli" canceled. Consequently, on 1 July 2019, the Division "Friuli" was renamed Division "Vittorio Veneto". The name was chose to commemorate the decisive Italian World War I victory in the Battle of Vittorio Veneto.

=== Multinational Division South ===
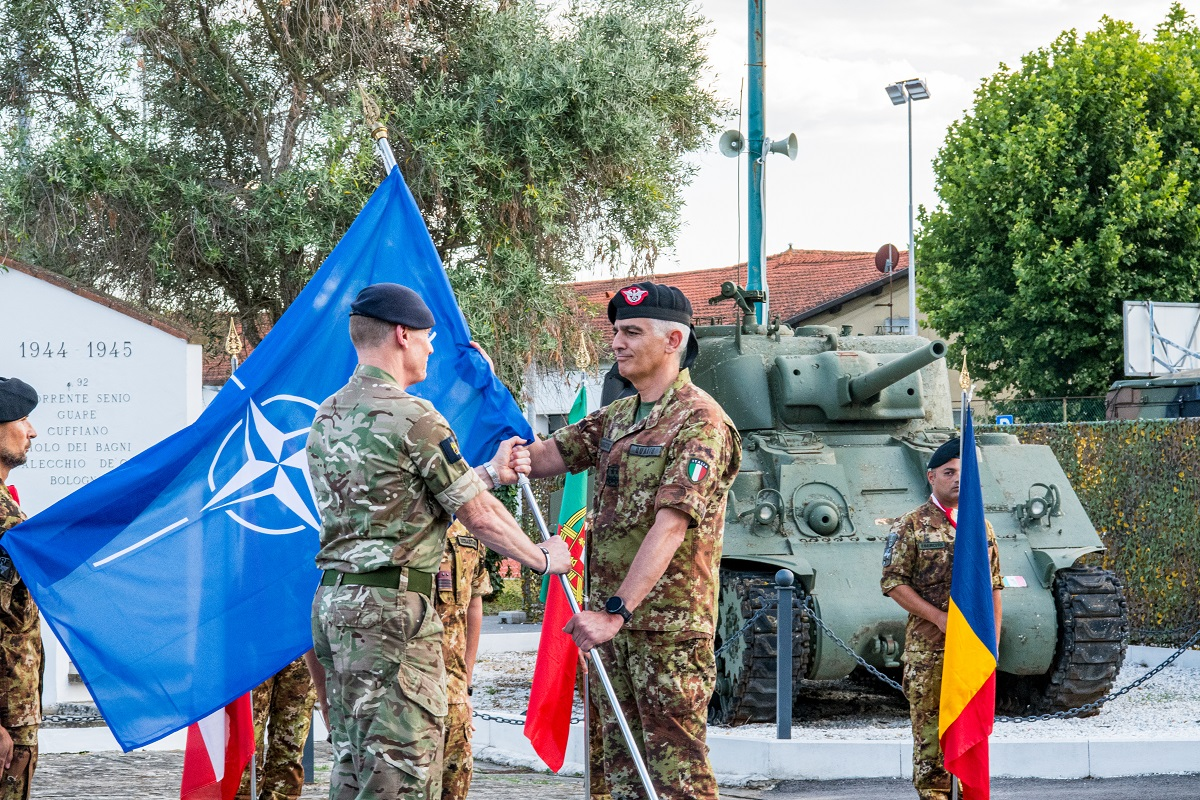
Multinational Division South activation ceremony on 1 July 2025; General Massimiliano Quarto receives the division's NATO flag

On 15 June 2025, the Division "Vittorio Veneto" was renamed Multinational Division South (MND-S). The renaming ceremony concluded a multi-year transformation process, which commenced after the 2018 NATO summit had endorsed a "Package on the South" to bolster the alliance's engagement with the Middle East and North Africa. Italy offered to transform one of its divisions for the task. In October 2019, NATO accepted the Italian offer to transform the Division "Vittorio Veneto" as one of five NATO division-level commands within the NATO Force Structure. Consequently, the Division "Vittorio Veneto" began the process to transform into a multinational NATO command. On 3 June 2024, NATO SACEUR General Christopher G. Cavoli signed the NATO Strategic Directive outlining the division's mission, goals, and certification. On 15 June 2025, the Division "Vittorio Veneto" was renamed Multinational Division South.

On 1 July 2025, the division was assigned as the Land Component Command (LCC) to the NATO Rapid Deployable Corps – Italy, which until 30 June 2026 forms NATO's Allied Reaction Force (ARF). The Allied Reaction Force is NATO's rapid deployable crisis response command tasked with deterrence and the defence of the Euro-Atlantic Area.

From January to March 2026, in Bergen (D) Training Area MND-S was involved as ARF LCC in NATO exercise "Steadfast Dart 2026"

From the 30th of July 2026 MND-S' role of ARF LCC was handed over to 3rd French Division. On the 1st of July, MND-S received three italian national brigades: the 132nd Armoured Brigade "Ariete", the Mechanized Brigade "Sassari" and the Cavalry Brigade "Pozzuolo del Friuli".

== Organization ==
=== Division "Vittorio Veneto" ===
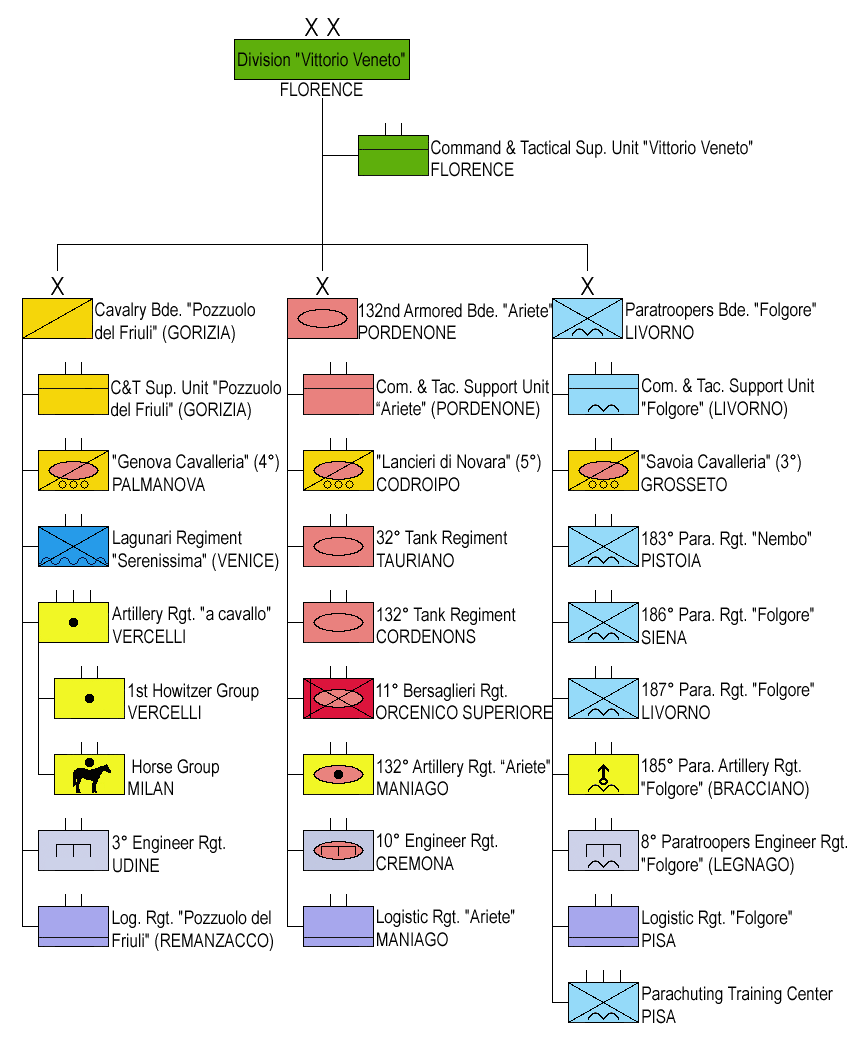
Division "Vittorio Veneto" organization until 2022 (click to enlarge)

Until 2022 the Division "Vittorio Veneto" commanded the following units in Northern Italy:

- Division "Vittorio Veneto", in Florence
  - Command and Tactical Supports Unit "Vittorio Veneto", in Florence
  - Cavalry Brigade "Pozzuolo del Friuli", in Gorizia
  - 132nd Armored Brigade "Ariete", in Pordenone
  - Paratroopers Brigade "Folgore", in Livorno

Since 2022 the division's only permanently assigned unit is the 78th Command and Tactical Supports Unit "Lupi di Toscana" in Florence.

- Division "Vittorio Veneto", in Florence
  - 78th Command and Tactical Supports Unit "Lupi di Toscana", in Florence
    - Command Company
    - Tactical and Logistic Support Battalion
      - Deployment Support Company
      - Transport Company

=== Multinational Division South ===
From the 1st of July 2026, the organization of the Multinational Division South is as follows:

- Multinational Division South", in Florence
  - 78th Command and Tactical Supports Unit "Lupi di Toscana", in Florence
    - Support Company
    - Tactical and Logistic Support Battalion
      - Deployment Support Company
      - Transportation Company
  - 132nd Armored Brigade "Ariete", in Pordenone
  - Cavalry Brigade "Pozzuolo del Friuli", in Gorizia
  - Mechanized Brigade "Sassari", in Sassari
