= Operational Land Forces Command =

- Comando Forze Operative Terrestri
- Coat of arms of the Operational Land Forces Command
- Active: 1 October 1997 - 30 September 2016 (Operational Land Forces Command); 1 October 2016 - present (Operational Land Forces Command)
- Country: Italy
- Branch: Italian Army
- Part of: Staff of the Italian Army
- Garrison/HQ: Rome

Commanders
- Current commander: Gen. C.A. Federico Bonato

Operational Land Forces Command (Italian: Comando delle Forze Operative Terrestri, COMFOTER) is the Italian Army's major command tasked with the operational and administrative control of most of its combat forces. COMFOTER reports directly to the Chief of Staff of the Italian Army. The command is based in Rome.

== History ==
The Operational Land Forces Command traces its origins back to the Operational Land Forces Command established in 1997.

=== 1997 - 2016: Operational Land Forces Command ===
The Operational Land Forces Command (Italian: Comando delle Forze Operative Terrestri, COMFOTER) was established in Verona on 1 October 1997 following the reform of the military who attributed hierarchical supremacy of the Chief of the Defence Staff.
It brought together in a single organization all the units engaged in combat, combat support, combat service support and in communication and information systems, which together amounted to about 80% of the Italian Army. Initially it was part of the Allied Land Forces Southern Europe (LANDSOUTH), with whom he shared the headquarters of the command, which then broke away, when the Allied Land Forces Command in Southern Europe in 2004 was transferred to Madrid, and had four commands:

- Supports Command;
- Command of projection forces;
- 1st Command of the Defence Forces;
- 2nd Command of the Defence Forces;
- Alpine troops Command.

Until 30 September 2016, COMFOTER controlled

- Division "Friuli"
- 2nd Defence Forces Command
- Alpine troops Command
- Army Signals and Information Command
- Army Aviation Command
- NATO Rapid Deployable Corps – Italy
- Paratroopers Brigade "Folgore"
- Artillery Command
- Anti-Aircraft Command
- Engineering Command

The headquarters of COMFOTER in Verona was Carli Palace, even if the command department is located at the Dalla Bona barracks of Verona.

=== 2016 - present: Operational Land Forces Command ===
The Operational Land Forces Command was established on 1 October 2016, after the splitting of the Operational Land Forces Command in the Operational Land Forces Command (COMFOTER) itself and in the Operational Land Forces Support Command.

The 2013 Revision Plan of the Ground Military Instrument of the Army Staff gave to the Operational Land Forces Support Command (COMFOTER SPT), to the Operational Forces Command - North (COMFOP NORD), to the Operational Forces Command - South (COMFOP SUD) and to the Alpine Troops Command (COMTA) a chain of command independent from the COMFOTER, while maintaining the newly established COMFOTER COE directly under the Chief of Staff of the Italian Army.

In May 2023 the two deployable division commands "Acqui" and "Vittorio Veneto", as well as the Army Simulation and Validation Center were assigned to the Operational Land Forces Command and Army Operational Command. On 1 July 2023 the Capital Military Command was merged into the Operational Land Forces Command and Army Operational Command, which on the same date changed its name to Operational Land Forces Command.

=== List of commanders ===
The Operational Land Forces Command had nine Commanders:

- Ten. Gen. Giuseppe Ardito (1997 - 2001)
- Ten. Gen. Alberto Ficuciello (2001 - 2003)
- Ten. Gen. Antonio Quintana (2003)
- Gen. C.A. Cosimo D'Arrigo (2003 - 2005)
- Gen. C.A. Bruno Iob (2005 - 2008)
- Gen. C.A. Armando Novelli (2008 - 2010)
- Gen. C.A. Francesco Tarricone (2010 - 2012)
- Gen. C.A. Roberto Bernardini (2012 - 2014)
- Gen. C.A. Alberto Primicerj (2014 - 2016)

As of 2020, the Operational Land Forces Command has had two commanders:

- Gen. C.A. Riccardo Marchiò (2017 - 2018)
- Gen. C.A. Federico Bonato (2018 - present)

== Mission ==
The Operational Land Forces Command plans, organizes and conducts the delegated operations by delegation of the Chief of the Defence Staff or the Deputy Commander of the Joint Operational Command (VCOM OPS).

The Command constitutes the ground-based component command of the Deputy Commander of the Joint Operational Command for the planning, organization, conduct and support of operations that do not require a deployed land component command or plan, organize and monitor the phases that precede the deployment of a land component command in readiness.

For operational aspects, although the COMFOTER-COE no longer has direct responsibility for the various Maneuver Brigades, it remains responsible for elaborating guidelines for preparing and training the Commands and Units, supervising and generating the forces and contingent planning engaged in national and international missions and operations.

== Organization ==
The Commander of the Operational Land Forces Command controls both units and commands and a direct-collaboration military apparatus.

=== Operational Land Forces Command ===
The Operational Land Forces Command is subdivided in some subordinate bodies:

- Commander's Secretariat
- Planning, Programming and Budget Section
- COMFOTER COE General Staff
  - COMFOTER COE General Staff Office
  - COMFOTER COE Chief of General Staff's Office
  - Operations General Staff
    - Operations General Staff Secretariat
    - Plans Office
    - Operations Office
    - Operations Support Office
    - Information Office
    - Special Operations Section
  - Preparation General Staff
    - Preparation General Staff Secretariat
    - Training Office
    - Preparation Office
    - Simulation and Training Technologies Office
  - Commander COMFOTER Territorial Areas
    - Military Geographical Institute, in Florence (Tuscany)
    - Army Military Command "Sardegna", in Cagliari, covering the island of Sardinia
      - 1st Armored Regiment, in Capo Teulada (Sardinia) managing the Capo Teulada Training Area
    - Military Penitentiary Organization Command, in Santa Maria Capua Vetere (Campania)
    - Italian Army Music Band, in Rome (Lazio)
    - Bersaglieri History Museum, in Rome (Lazio)
    - Logistic Support Unit "Monte Romano", in Monte Romano (Lazio)

=== Organization 2023 ===
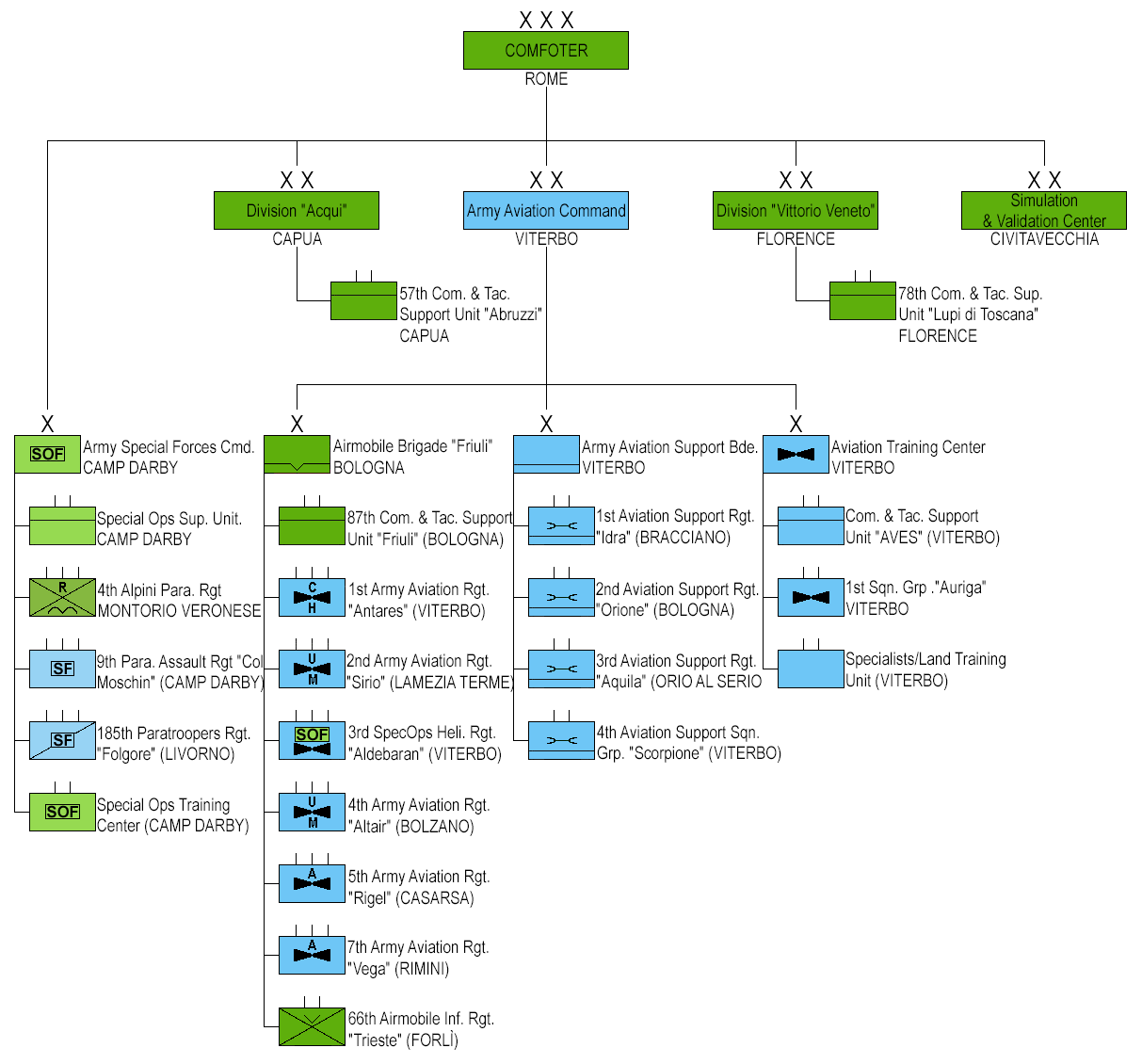
Operational Land Forces Command organization from 1 July 2023 to 30 April 2024

From 1 July 2023 to 30 April 2024 the Operational Land Forces Command consisted of the following units:

- Operational Land Forces Command, in Rome
  - Division "Acqui", in Capua (Campania)
  - Division "Vittorio Veneto", in Florence (Tuscany)
  - Army Special Forces Command, at Camp Darby (Tuscany)
  - Army Aviation Command, in Viterbo (Lazio)
    - Army Aviation Training Center, at Viterbo Airport (Lazio)
    - Army Aviation Support Brigade, at Viterbo Airport (Lazio)
    - Airmobile Brigade "Friuli", in Bologna (Emilia-Romagna)
  - Army Simulation and Validation Center, in Civitavecchia (Lazio)

=== Organization 2025 ===
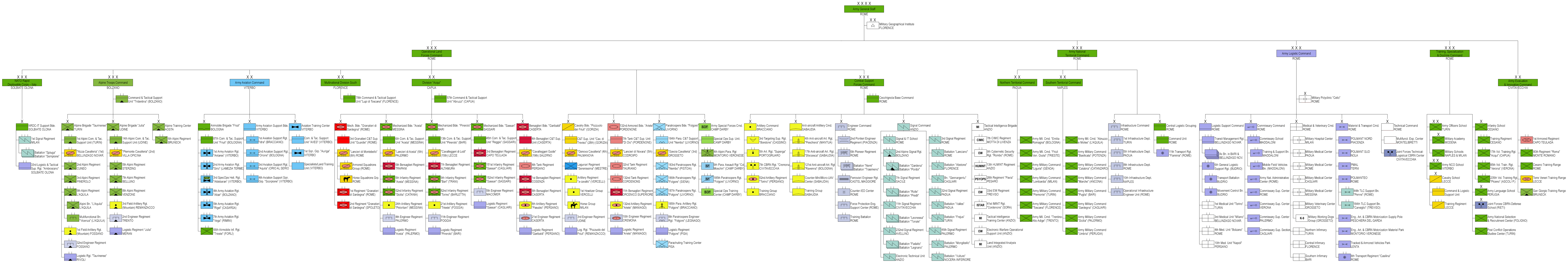
Operational Land Forces Command organization since 1 October 2025 (click to enlarge)

As of 1 October 2025 the Operational Land Forces Command consists of the following units:

- Operational Land Forces Command, in Rome
  - NATO Rapid Deployable Corps – Italy
  - Combat Support Forces Command
  - Alpine Troops Command
  - Army Aviation Command
  - Army Special Forces Command
  - Division "Acqui"
  - Multinational Division South
  - Paratroopers Brigade "Folgore"
  - Cavalry Brigade "Pozzuolo del Friuli"
  - 132nd Armored Brigade "Ariete"
