= Division "Acqui" =

- Divisione "Acqui"
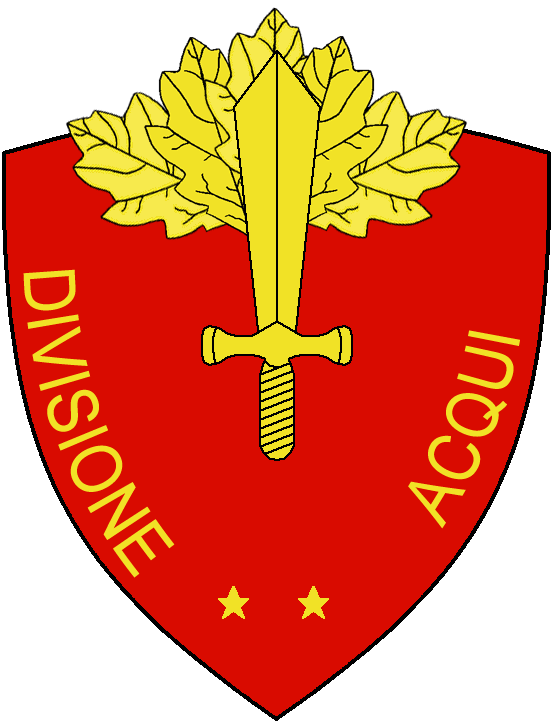
- Coat of Arms of the Division "Acqui"
- Active: 31 December 2002 - today
- Country: Italy
- Branch: Italian Army
- Part of: Operational Land Forces Command
- Garrison/HQ: Capua

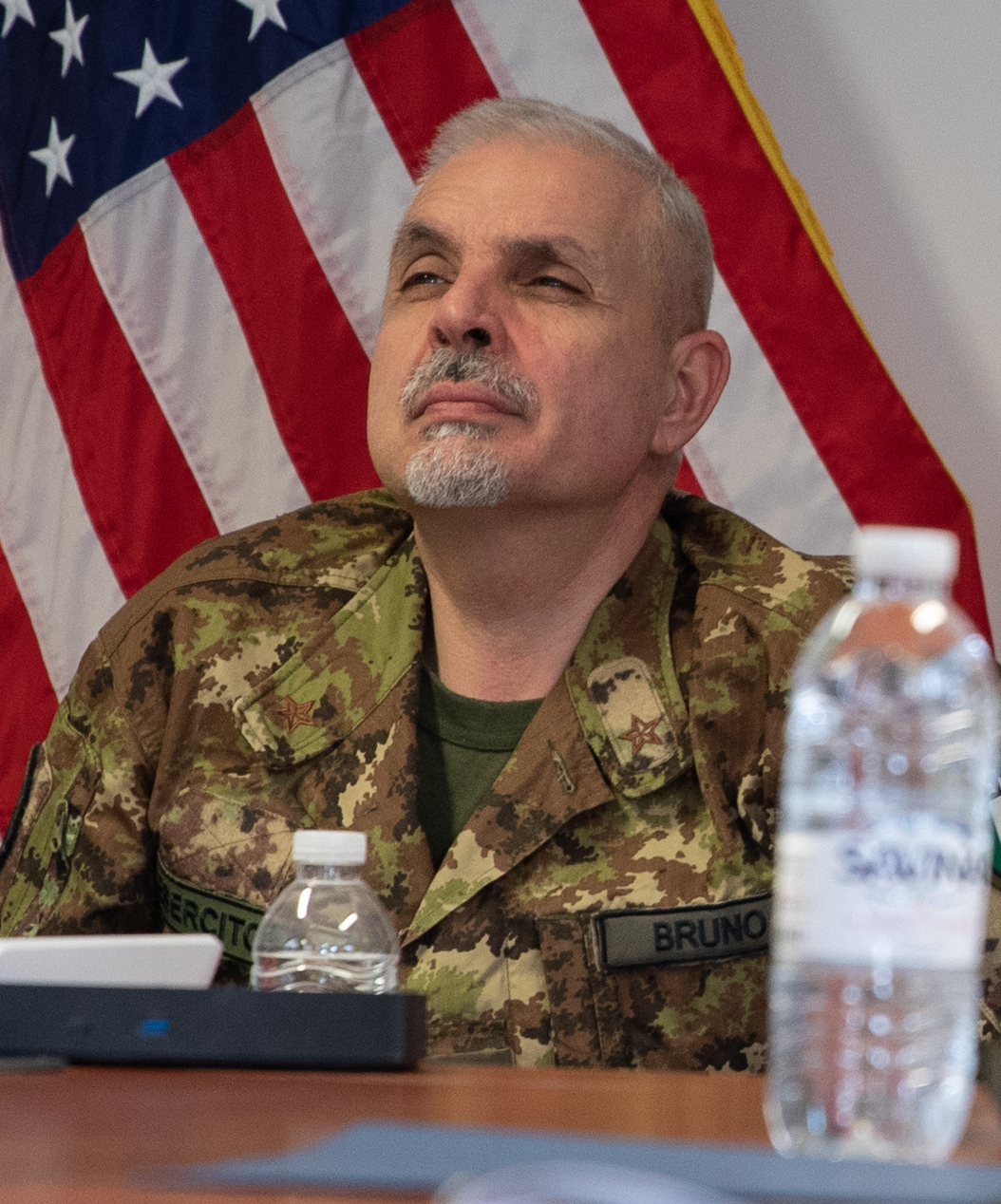
Francesco Bruno, general and comandant from 2022

The Division "Acqui" (Italian: Divisione "Acqui") is one of three active divisions of the Italian Army. The division is the army's high readiness command for out-of-area operations. The Acqui is based in Capua in the Province of Caserta and assigned to the Operational Land Forces Command. The division carries on the name and traditions of the World War II Royal Italian Army 33rd Infantry Division "Acqui" and the Cold War Italian Army Motorized Brigade "Acqui".

== History ==
In 2002 the Italian Army decided to raise three division commands, with one of the three always readily deployable for NATO missions. The army decided that each of the three should carry on the traditions of one of the divisions that served with distinction in World War II. Therefore, on 31 December 2002 the 3rd Italian Division in San Giorgio a Cremano was renamed Division Command "Acqui".

Initially the division was assigned only a Command and Tactical Supports Unit with further units to be assigned only in case of war. In 2013 the Italian army decided to abolish the corps-level and assign the army's brigades to the three divisions: Acqui, Tridentina, and Friuli. Therefore, on 5 July 2016 the Acqui took command of five brigades in Southern and Central Italy. However, as of 2019 the plans to disband the corps-level are on hold and the Division "Acqui" had to return operational control of its brigades to the Southern Operational Forces Command.

In 2022 the Acqui was assigned to the Operational Land Forces Command and the division's brigades were assigned to the Southern Operational Forces Command.

== Organization ==
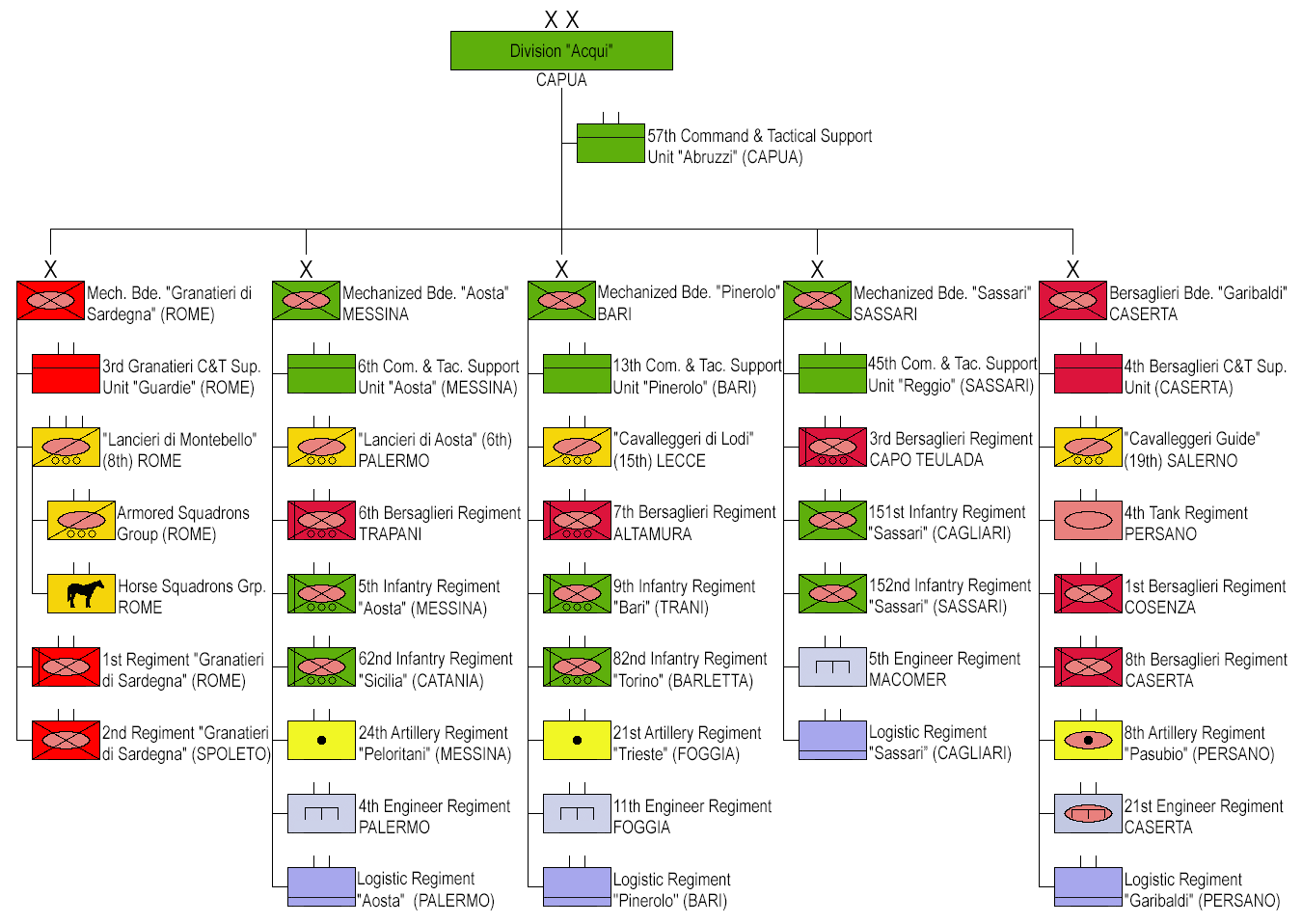
Division "Acqui" organization 2025 (click to enlarge)

The Division "Acqui" commands the following units in Southern and Central Italy:

- Division "Acqui", in Capua
  - 57th Command and Tactical Supports Unit "Abruzzi", in Capua
  - Mechanized Brigade "Granatieri di Sardegna" in Lazio and Umbria
  - Mechanized Brigade "Aosta" on Sicily
  - Mechanized Brigade "Pinerolo" in Apulia
  - Mechanized Brigade "Sassari" on Sardinia
  - Bersaglieri Brigade "Garibaldi" in Campania
