= Ray D'Addario =

American photographer

Raymond D'Addario
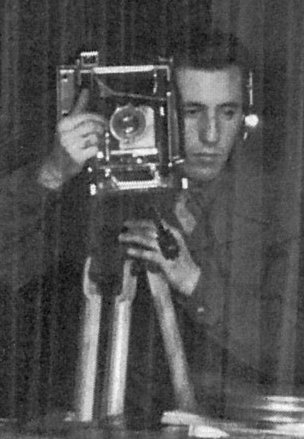
- D'Addario photographing the proceedings of the Nuremberg trials, c. 1946
- Born: August 18, 1920; Holyoke, Massachusetts, United States
- Died: February 13, 2011 (aged 90); Holyoke, Massachusetts, United States
- Known for: Video and photography
- Notable work: Courtroom photography of the Nuremberg trials, other post-WWII photographs of Germany

Raymond D'Addario (August 18, 1920 – February 13, 2011) was an American photographer, known especially for his images of the Nazi leaders during the Nuremberg trials.

D'Addario, whose family was originally from the Italian town of Torino di Sangro in Abruzzo, worked as a freelance photographer from 1938, turning his hobby into his profession. He enlisted in the United States Army before it entered the Second World War; after the Japanese attack on Pearl Harbor, he was assigned to London as an army photographer. Selected to cover the Nuremberg trials along with other members of the military imaging service team, D’Addario was the most prolific of them. He had to face the restrictions for the taking of images imposed by the court, including among others not using a flash. The thousands of images he took, both in black and white and color, were those published in all international press coverage of the 21 defendants, some of them notable for starting their own discourse. Although his work was best known for his images of the defendant's bench, he also took singular images of the prosecutors, some silent motion pictures of the court itself, and the city of Nuremberg, devastated by the allied bombings in the war. Although he was discharged at the end of the trials of the Nazi leaders, D'Addario was called again to document other trials of the war crimes of more than 200 Nazis.

== Selected works ==
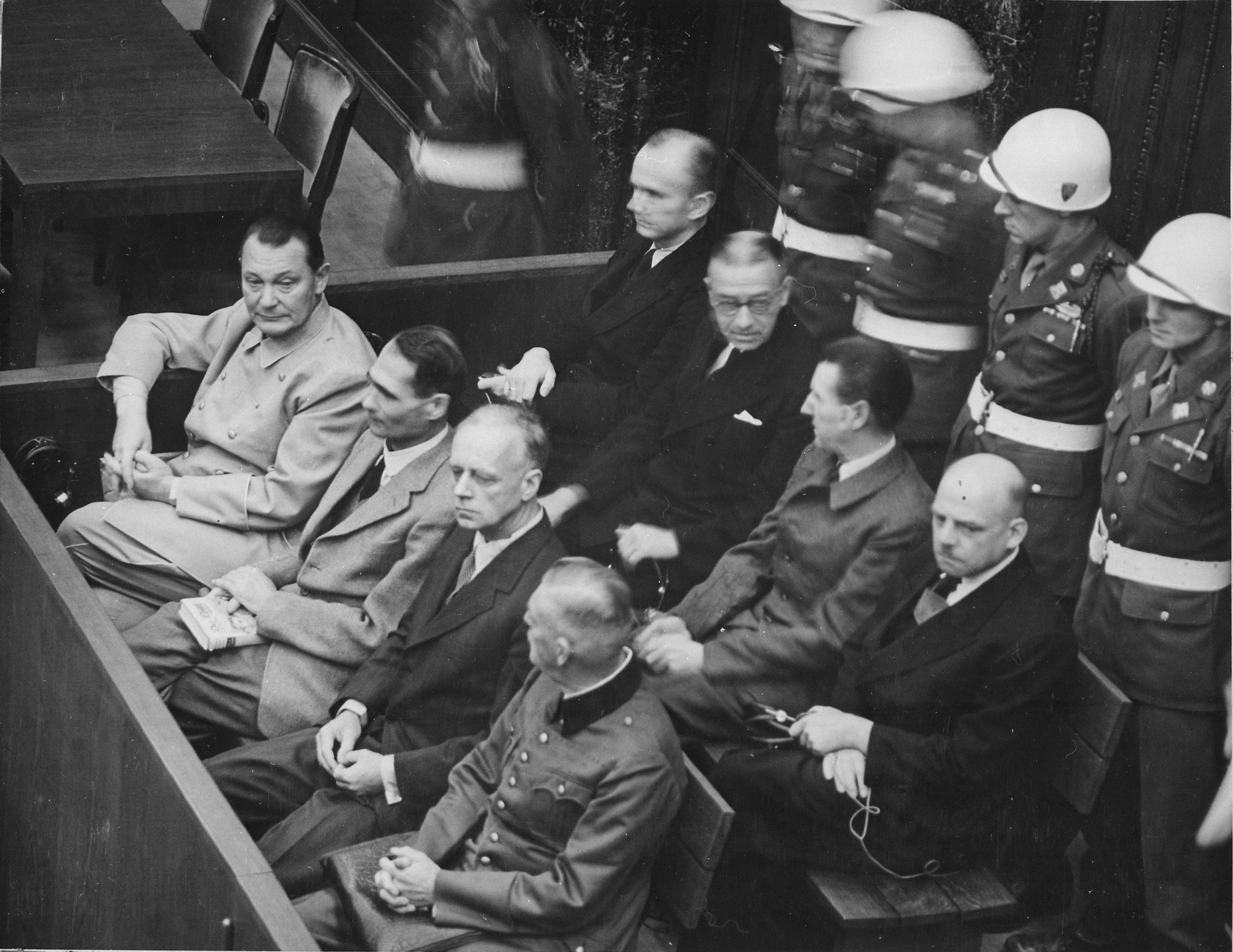
One of D'Addario's best known photographs of the Nuremberg Trials, the defendants bench; clockwise from back to front, Karl Dönitz, Erich Raeder, Baldur von Schirach, Fritz Sauckel, Hermann Göring, Rudolf Heß, Joachim von Ribbentrop, Wilhelm Keitel

- Nürnberg, damals, heute : 100 Bilder zum Nachdenken ("Nuremberg, Then and Today: 100 Images for Reflection"), 1970
- Der Nürnberger Prozess ("The Nuremberg Trial", with Klaus Kastner), 1994
