= NATO Rapid Deployable Corps – Italy =

Multi-national corps headquarters of the Italian Army and NATO

Coordinates: 45°38′40″N 8°51′27″E

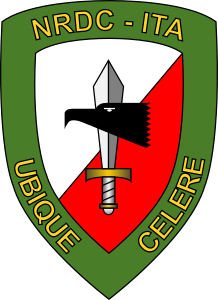
- Coat of arms
- Active: 2001–present
- Branch: Italian Army
- Part of: Operational Land Forces Command / Allied Command Operations
- Location: Milan & Solbiate Olona, Italy
- Motto: Ubique Celere
- Website: nrdc-ita.nato.int

Commanders
- Current commander: Lieutenant General Gianluca Carai

The NATO Rapid Deployable Corps – Italy (NRDC-ITA) is a multi-national corps headquarters of the Italian Army. It was established in November 2001 as a High Readiness Force (HRF) of NATO. The staff of NRDC-ITA is located in Solbiate Olona, a few kilometers northwest of Milan. The Ugo Mara barracks at Solbiate Olona is the operational center of the command structure and the Support Brigade while the institutional center is located in Palazzo Cusani, in the center of Milan.

== History ==
In 1997, in the wake of a major restructuring of the Italian Army, the 3rd Army Corps was transformed into the Projection Forces Command (COMFOP) in command and control of three brigades, which were characterized by high mobility and deployability. However already on 1 December 2000 the 3rd Army Corps ceded its last brigades to the 1st Defence Forces Command (COMFOD 1°) and with its personnel the NATO Rapid Deployable Corps Italy was raised in January 2001.

The formation served in Afghanistan as part of the International Security Assistance Force in 2005 and, in collaboration with other international forces, was fully engaged in military operations there. Then, in July 2023, it was designated the headquarters of the Allied Reaction Force, a NATO grouping ready to deploy at particularly short notice.

== Structure ==
NRDC-ITA is operationally led by NATO's Joint Force Command Headquarters in Naples or Brunssum. The Commander and a large part of the staff are Italian. Normally, the Corps commands only a support brigade, but it can command further support units as well as a number of divisions or brigades. On 1 July 2025, the Multinational Division South (MND-S) in Florence was assigned operationally to the corps for the duration of one year.

- NATO Rapid Deployable Corps – Italy, in Solbiate Olona (Lombardy)
  - NRDC-ITA Support Brigade, in Solbiate Olona (Lombardy)
    - 1st Signal Regiment, in Milan (Lombardy)
      - Battalion "Spluga"
      - Battalion "Sempione"
    - 33rd Logistic and Tactical Support Regiment "Ambrosiano", in Solbiate Olona (Lombardy)
