= Allied Reaction Force =

NATO intervention force

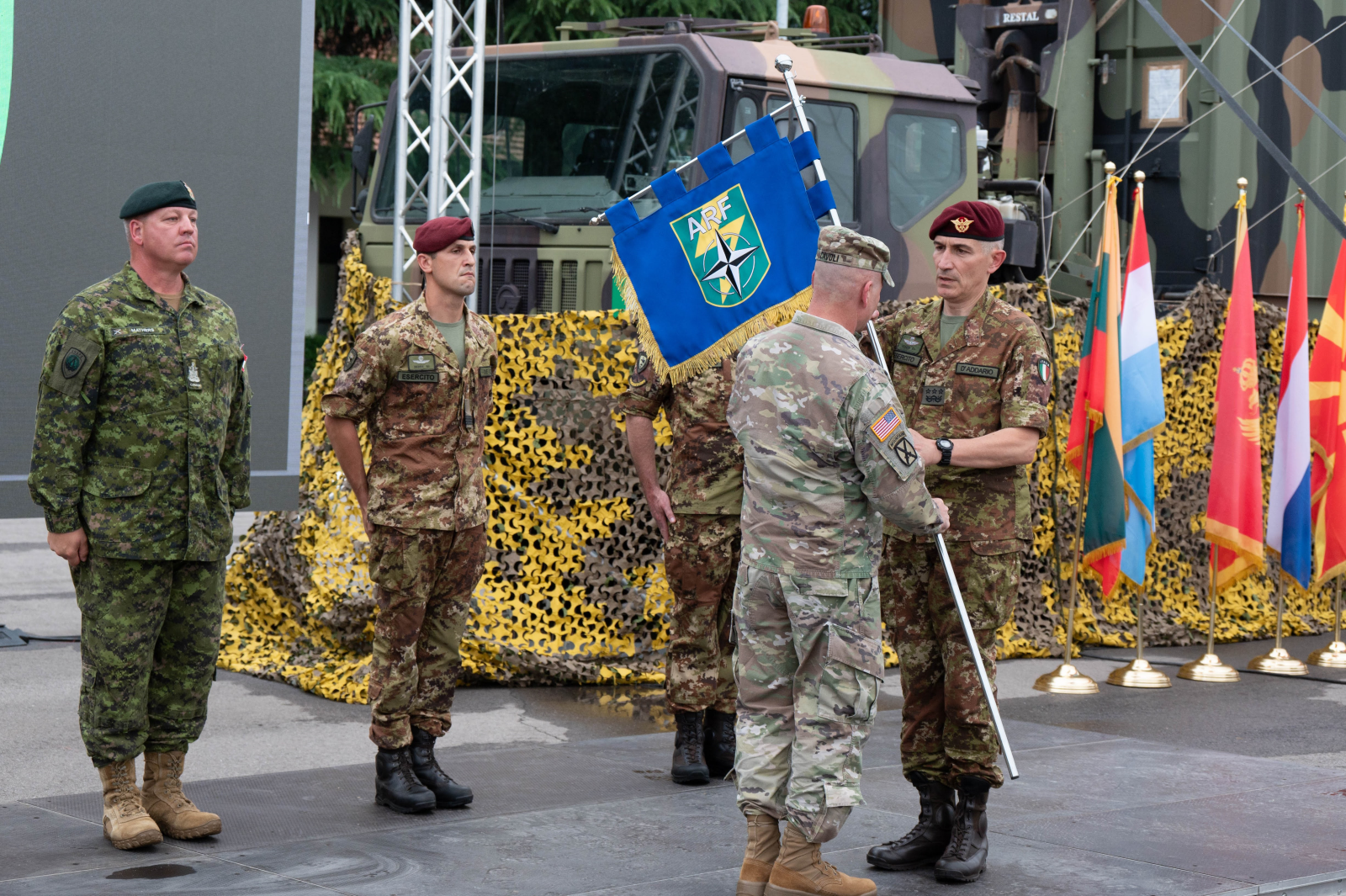
ARF replaces the NATO Response Force (NRF)

The Allied Reaction Force (ARF) is a rapidly-deployable North Atlantic Treaty Organization (NATO) intervention force of division strength within the framework of the new NATO Force Model (NFM). Set up following the Russian invasion of Ukraine in 2022, the ARF replaced the NATO Response Force (NRF) and its Very High Readiness Joint Task Force (VJTF) in 2024.
