= Italian occupation of Corsica =

WWII event (1942–1943)

- Part of Case Anton
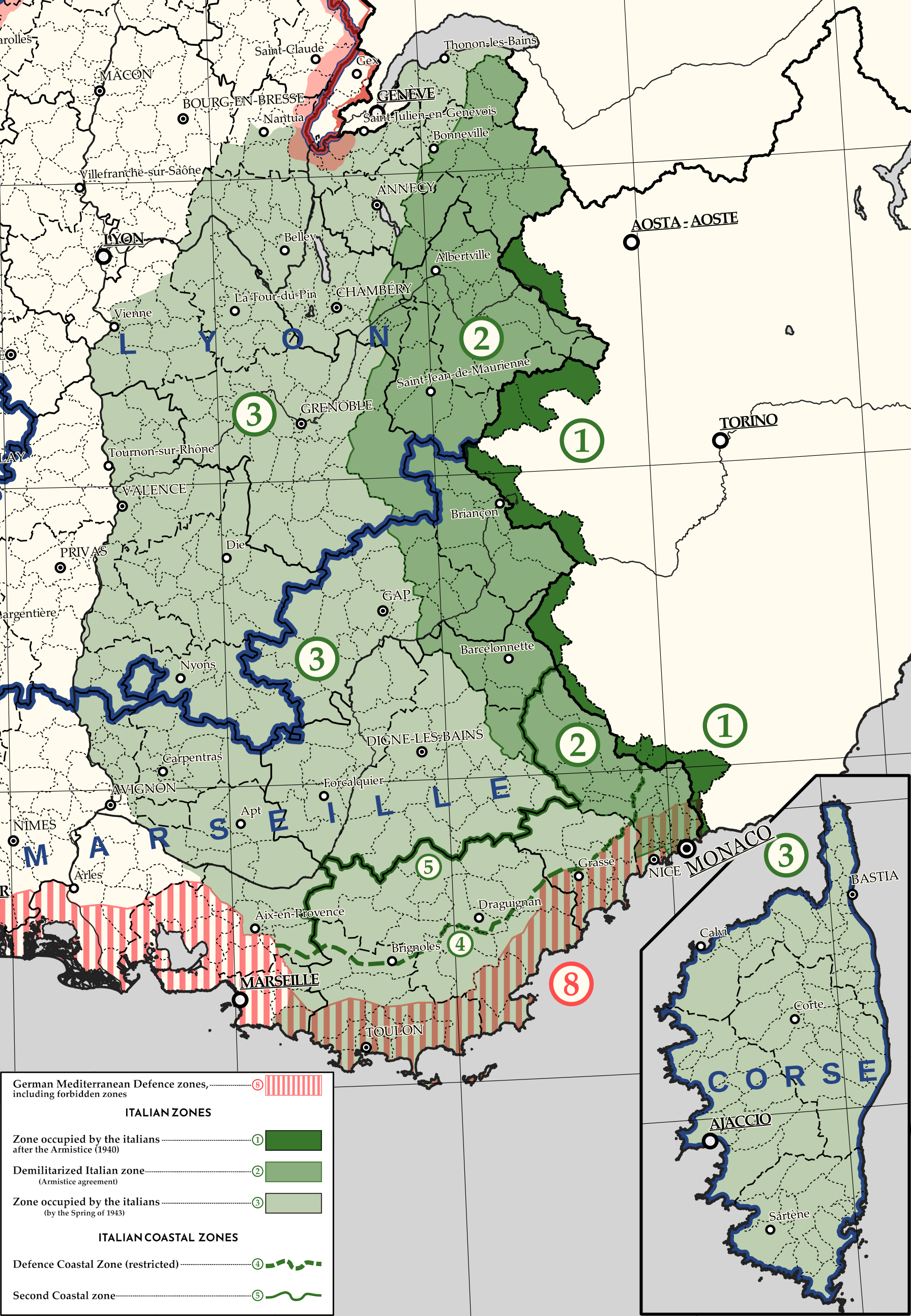
- Map of the Italian occupation of France
Date	11–12 November 1942 – Fall 1943
Location	Corsica
Result	Italian victory
Territorial changes	Italian occupation of south-east France and Corsica

Belligerents
Italy	Vichy France

Commanders and leaders
Giacomo Carboni	Paul Balley

The Kingdom of Italy occupied the French island of Corsica during the Second World War, from November 1942 to September 1943. After an initial period of increased control over the island, by early spring 1943 the Maquis had begun to occupy the hinterland. In the aftermath of the Armistice of Cassibile, the Italian capitulation to the Allies, the Germans evacuated Sardinia via Corsica and occupied the island with the support of Italian units who had defected to them. Italian troops under Giovanni Magli, the Maquis and Free French Forces joined forces against the Germans and liberated the island.

== Background ==
=== Operation Torch ===
On 8 November 1942, the Western Allies landed in North Africa in Operation Torch. The Germans implemented a contingency plan, Case Anton to occupy Zone Libre, the part of France not occupied in 1940. The plan included Operazione C2 (11 November) the Italian occupation of the French island of Corsica and mainland France up to the Rhone. The Italian occupation of Corsica had been strongly promoted by Italian irredentism by the Fascist regime.

== Italian occupation ==
=== Italian garrison ===
The 20th Infantry Division "Friuli", of VII Corps (VII Corpo d'armata) made an unopposed landing on Corsica. The absence of Corsican resistance and a desire to avoid trouble with the Vichy French limited Italian recruitment of Corsicans, except for a labour battalion in March 1943. The Corsican population initially showed some support for the Italians, partly as a consequence of irredentist propaganda. The VII Corps garrison eventually comprised the 20th Infantry Division "Friuli" and 44th Infantry Division "Cremona", the 225th Coastal Division and the 226th Coastal Division, a battalion of Alpini and an armoured battalion. The garrison was commanded by General Umberto Mondino until the end of December 1942, when General Giacomo Carboni took over until March 1943, followed by General Giovanni Magli until September 1943. The initial occupation force of 30,000 Italian troops rose to just under 85,000 men, a huge number relative to the Corsican population of 220,000.

=== Collaboration ===
Some Corsican military officers collaborated with Italy, including Major Pantalacci (ret.) and his son Antonio, Colonel Mondielli, Colonel Simon Petru Cristofini and Marta Renucci, his wife, the first Corsican female journalist. Cristofini collaborated early in 1943 and (as head of the Ajaccio troops) helped the Italian Army to repress the Maquis, before the Italian Armistice in September 1943. He worked with the Corsican writer Petru Giovacchini, who was named as the potential governor of Corsica, if Italy annexed the island. In the first months of 1943, the irredentists, under the leadership of Giovacchini and Bertino Poli, disseminated propaganda to the public, promoting the unification of Corsica as a "Corsica Governorate", similar to the Governatorate of Dalmatia of 1941. Public support for the Italian occupation was lukewarm until the summer 1943. Benito Mussolini postponed unification until a peace treaty after the anticipated Axis victory, mainly because of German opposition to irredentist claims.

=== Administration ===
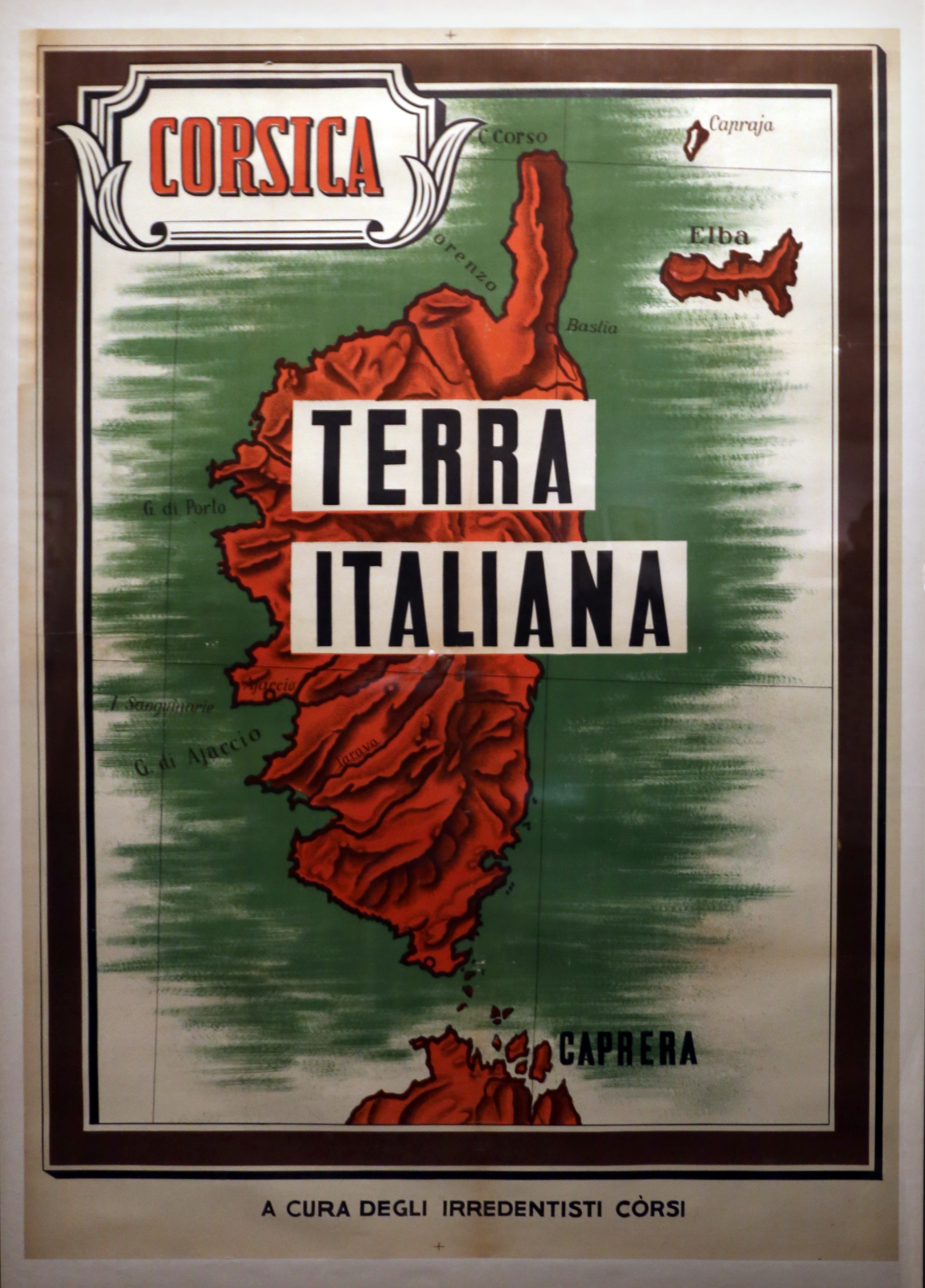
Corsican irredentist propaganda, c. 1941

Social and economic life in Corsica was administered by the French civil authorities, the préfet and four sous-préfets in Ajaccio, Bastia, Sartene and Corte. This helped to maintain calm on the island during the first months of Italian occupation. On 14 November 1943, the préfet restated French sovereignty over the island and stated that the Italian troops had been occupiers.

=== Resistance ===
Initially there was no Resistance by the Corsicans, but after the first months it started to increase during the occupation. The mission secrète Pearl Harbour (secret mission Pearl Harbor) commanded by Roger de Saule, arrived from Algiers on 14 December 1942 on the Free French submarine Casabianca (Capitaine de frégate Jean L'Herminier). The mission co-ordinated the local Maquis that merged as the Front national in which the communists were most influential. The R2 Corse network was originally formed in connexion with the Gaullist resistance in January 1943. Its leader, Fred Scamaroni, failed to unite the movements and was later captured and tortured, committing suicide on 19 March 1943. In April 1943, Paulin Colonna d'Istria was dispatched from Algeria by Charles de Gaulle to unite the movements. By early 1943, the Maquis was sufficiently organised to request arms deliveries. The Maquis leadership was reinforced and morale was boosted by six visits by Casabianca, bringing personnel and arms, later supplemented by air drops. The Maquis became more ambitious and gained control of considerable territory, especially the countryside, by the summer of 1943. In June and July 1943 the Organizzazione per la Vigilanza e la Repressione dell'Antifascismo (OVRA) the Italian fascist secret police and Black Shirts began mass repression, in which 860 Corsicans were jailed and deported to Italy. On 30 August, Jean Nicoli and two French partisans of the Front National were shot in Bastia, by order of an Italian war tribunal.

== Liberation ==
=== Prelude ===
==== Italian capitulation ====
By the time of the Armistice of Cassibile, signed on 3 September 1943, in which the Italians withdrew from the Axis, German occupation forces in Corsica comprised the Brigade Reichsführer SS, a battalion of the 15th Panzergrenadier Division, two heavy coastal artillery batteries and one of heavy anti-aircraft guns. On 7 September, General Fridolin von Senger und Etterlin arrived to take command. Senger received assurances from the Italian commander, Generale Giovanni Magli, that the Italian garrison would continue to fight against the local resistance and not oppose the arrival of German troops from Sardinia. About 20,000 French Maquis were on the island, and the Germans suspected that many Italians would defect.

==== Operation Achse ====
At the First Quebec Conference 17–24 August 1943, the Allies had decided not to occupy Sardinia and Corsica until Italy had capitulated and Allied air bases had been established around Rome. Unternehmen Achse (Operation Axis), a German plan to forestall an Italian surrender and defection to the Allies, began on 8 September, which included the evacuation of the garrisons of Sardinia to Corsica. When news of the Armistice was announced on 8 September, German forces began to embark from the ports of La Maddalena and Santa Teresa Gallura on the north coast of Sardinia, landing at Porto-Vecchio and Bonifacio in Corsica, the Italian coastal gunners nearby not interfering with the operation. The Germans used craft available since the evacuation of Sicily and barges that could be diverted from transporting fuel from Leghorn (Livorno) to the front in Italy to move troops from Sardinia to Corsica. Fliegerführer Sardinia moved to Ghisonaccia Airfield in Corsica on 10 September, becoming Fliegerführer Corsica and the next day the last 44 Luftwaffe aircraft in Sardinia arrived.

==== Action off Bastia ====
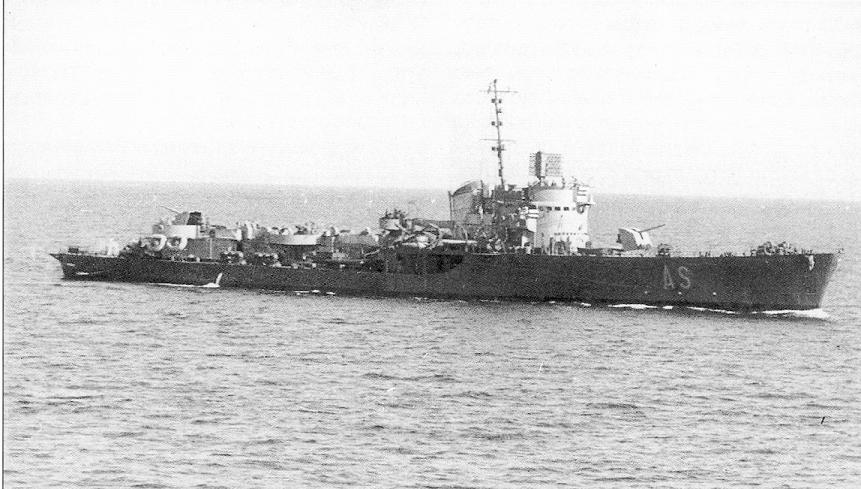
Italian torpedo boat Aliseo

At midnight on 8/9 September, German marines captured Bastia harbour, damaged Ardito and massacred seventy of the crew. The merchant ship Humanitas (7,980 gross register tons [GRT]) and a MAS boat were also damaged but Aliseo managed to sail at the last moment. The next day, Italian troops counter-attacked and forced the Germans out; the port commander ordered Commander Fecia di Cossato, the captain of Aliseo, to prevent Germans ships in the harbour from escaping. At dawn on 9 September, lookouts on Aliseo spotted German ships leaving the harbour in the early morning mist and turning north, close to the coast.

Aliseo was outnumbered and outgunned, having only a speed advantage over the German flotilla but closed on the submarine chaser UJ2203 as it opened fire, zig-zagging until 7:06 a.m. to a range of about 8,000 yd (4.5 mi; 3.9 nmi; 7.3 km), opening fire on the German ships. At 7:30 a.m. Aliseo was hit in the engine room and brought to a stop but the damage was quickly repaired. Aliseo caught up with the German ships again and hit UJ2203 and some of the barges. At 8:20 a.m. UJ2203 exploded with the loss of nine of the crew. Aliseo fired on UJ2219 and after ten minutes it exploded and sank. The barges, which were well-armed and had been firing continuously, separated but three were sunk by 8:35 a.m. At 8:40 a.m. Aliseo attacked another two barges, which were also under fire from Italian shore batteries, and with the assistance of the corvette Cormorano, forced their crews to beach them. Aliseo rescued 25 Germans, but 160 had been killed.

==== Evacuation of Sardinia ====
From 8 to 15 September, the Germans conducted demolitions on seven Sardinian airfields but Italian aircraft had begun landing on other airfields on 10 September, some en route to Sicily and Tunisia to join the Allies, others to operate from Sardinia with the Allies. Five Cant Z 1007 bombers attacked German ships in the Bay of Bonifacio on 16 September. Luftwaffe aircraft retaliated with attacks on Sardinian airfields for the next four days. By 19 September, the 90th Panzergrenadier Division, a fortress brigade, anti-aircraft and Luftwaffe units comprising 25,800 men, 4,650 vehicles and 4,765 long tons (4,841 t) of supplies had reached Corsica from Sardinia. In Sardinia the XII Paratroopers Battalion of the 184th Infantry Division "Nembo" defected to the Germans.

=== Opération Vésuve ===
Liberation of Corsica
- Part of The Mediterranean and Middle East theatre of World War II
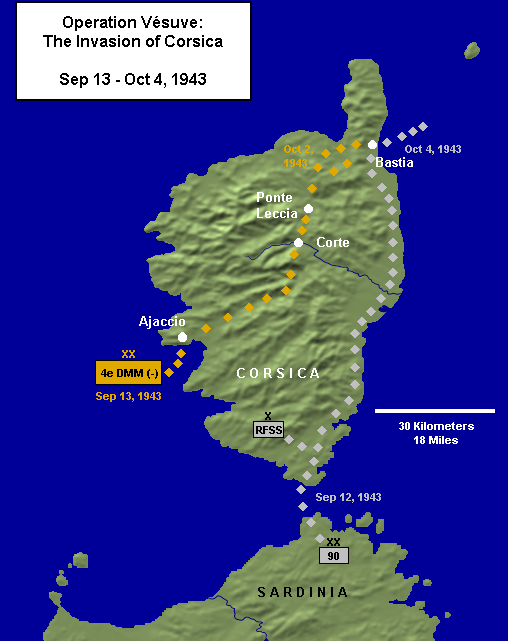
- Opération Vésuve, the French invasion of Corsica
Date	8 September – 4 October 1943
Location	Corsica 42°N 9°E
Result	Allied victory

Belligerents
Free France; Morocco; French Resistance; Kingdom of Italy; Air support United Kingdom; United States	Germany

Commanders and leaders
Henry Martin; Fernand Gambiez; Henri Giraud; Paulin Colonna d'Istria; Giovanni Magli	Fridolin von Senger und Etterlin; Carl-Hans Lungershausen; Karl Gesele

Strength
Free France: 6,000; Morocco: 4,500; French Resistance: 10,000; Kingdom of Italy: Part of the former 80,000 occupation troops	32,000

Casualties and losses
Free France: 75 killed 239 wounded Morocco: 120 killed 240 wounded French Resistance: 170 killed 300 wounded Kingdom of Italy: 637 killed 557 wounded	1,600 casualties: 1,000 killed; 400 captured; 600 artillery pieces, 100 tanks, and 5,000 other vehicles destroyed

The Free French General Henri Giraud feared that the Maquis on Corsica would be crushed unless the Allies intervened. Giraud gained the agreement of the Allied supreme commander of the North African Theater of Operations, General Dwight D. Eisenhower, to intervene. Eisenhower stipulated that no Allied forces engaged in Operation Avalanche, the landings at Salerno (9–16 September) and the French must use their own ships and troops. From 11 September, French troops were dispatched to Corsica from Algiers, the submarine Casabianca ferried 109 men to Ajaccio and from 13 to 24 September the destroyers Le Fantasque and Le Terrible delivered 500 men and 60 long tons (61 t) of supplies. On 16 September 30 men and 7 long tons (7.1 t) of supplies were delivered by the submarine Perle, followed on 17 September by 550 men and 60 long tons (61 t) of stores in Le Fantasque, Tempête and L'Alcyon; 5 long tons (5.1 t) of supplies were delivered by the submarine Aréthuse. An American commando unit comprising 400 men, with 20 long tons (20 t) of supplies, was landed from the Italian destroyers Legionario and Oriani.

On 12 September, Hitler ordered Corsica to be abandoned and Fregattenkapitän von Liebenstein, the commander of the Sicily evacuation, was sent to Corsica to supervise the naval withdrawal. The Germans planned to concentrate in the north-east of Corsica and use the port of Bastia and the airfields nearby to evacuate the German garrison to the Italian mainland (Livorno and Piombino) and to the island of Elba, between Corsica and Tuscany. Until 24 September, Luftwaffe transport aircraft operated from Ghisonaccia Airfield, about half-way up the east coast, to mainland airfields at Pisa, Lucca, Arena Metato and Pratica di Mare then closed the airfield. On 25 September, the air evacuation resumed from Bastia.

On 17 September, French General Henry Martin met with the Italian General Giovanni Magli in Corte to coordinate the movements of Allied and Italian troops. On 21 September, Giraud arrived in Corsica. On 22 September Sartène was liberated and on 23 September, advanced troops and Corsican resistance fighters reached Porto-Vecchio. The Italian troops of the 20th Infantry Division "Friuli", along with Moroccan colonial troops, took the San Stefano pass on 30 September and then the Teghime pass on 3 October, pressing the German withdrawal but they were unable to stop the evacuation, which was completed on 3 October. The sea evacuation transported 6,240 German troops, about 1,200 prisoners of war, more than 3,200 vehicles and 5,000 long tons (5,100 t) of stores. The Germans also airlifted 21,107 men and about 350 long tons (360 t) of supplies for a loss of 55 transport aircraft, most on the ground on Italian airfields, to Allied bombing. Allied bombers and submarines sank about 17,000 long tons (17,000 t) of shipping. (Note: The record of the German army high command, Oberkommando des Heeres, has 30,500 men evacuated with 7,430 long tons (7,550 t) of supplies and 3,500 vehicles.) German losses during the liberation amounted to around 1,600, including 1,000 killed and 400 captured, along with 600 artillery pieces, about 100 tanks, and 5,000 other vehicles destroyed. The Italians lost 637 soldiers killed and 557 wounded. The Resistance suffered 170 killed and about 300 wounded, while the Free French Forces recorded 75 killed and 239 wounded.

The transport of Allied forces to Corsica continued and on 21 September, 1,200 men, 110 long tons (110 t) of stores, six guns and six vehicles were delivered by the light cruiser Jeanne d'Arc and the destroyers Le Fantasque, Tempête and L'Alcyon. The French cruiser Montcalm and Le Fantasque arrived on 23 September with 1,500 troops and 200 long tons (200 t) of supplies. Another 350 men and 100 long tons (100 t) of supplies, 21 guns and thirty vehicles arrived on the destroyers Le Fortuné and l'Alcyon, Landing Ship, Tank-79 (LST-79) and the MMS-class minesweepers MMS 1 and MMS 116. Jeanne d'Arc returned with 850 men and 160 long tons (160 t) on 25 September, followed the next day by Montcalm and the British destroyer HMS Pathfinder with 750 men, 100 long tons (100 t) of supplies, twelve guns and ten vehicles. On 30 September 200 men, four guns and 70 vehicles arrived on Le Fortuné and LST-79, which was damaged by air attack and sank in the harbour. On 1 October, Jeanne d'Arc and l'Alcyon delivered 700 men and 170 long tons (170 t) of supplies.

The liberation of Corsica holds an important place in the history of the Resistance and the liberation of France. It was the first territory in Metropolitan France and the first French department liberated. After Corsica, Calvados would become the second department to be liberated during the Normandy landings in June 1944. The island became an important base for the United States Army Air Forces and Navy for the continuation of operations in Italy and then for Operation Dragoon, the Allied landing in Provence, in August 1944.

== Aftermath ==
=== Post-war reprisals ===
Nearly 100 collaborators or autonomists (including intellectuals) were put on trial by the French authorities in 1946. Among those found guilty, eight were sentenced to death. Seven of the death sentences were commuted, but one irredentist, Petru Cristofini, was convicted of treason and was executed. He tried to kill himself and was executed while he was dying in November 1946. Petru Giovacchini was forced to hide after the Allied re-occupation of the island. Prosecuted by a Free French tribunal in Corsica, he received a death sentence in 1945 and went into exile in Canterano, near Rome. He died in September 1955 from old war wounds. Since his death, the Italian irredentist movement in Corsica has been considered defunct.

=== Italian order of battle ===
Details from Barba 1995.

- Coast (16 battalions)
  - 225th Coastal Division (General Pedrotti)
  - 226th Coastal Division (General Lazzarini)
  - detached regiment
- North
  - 20th Infantry Division "Friuli" (Generale Cotronei)
  - gruppo da sbarco (landing group)
  - Blackshirt battalion (Consul Cognoni)
- South-west
  - 44th Infantry Division "Cremona" (General Primieri)
  - Raggruppamento Sud Generale Ticchioni.
- Central
  - 10th Raggruppamento Celere Colonnello Fucci
  - 175th Reggimento Alpini Colonnello Castagna
- Regia Marina (Ammiraglio Gaetano Catalano Gonzaga)
  - Bastia
  - Portovecchio
  - Ajaccio
- Regia Aeronautica (Colonnello Baudoin)
  - Borgo
  - Ghisonaccia
  - Ajaccio
  - Portovecchio
  - Campo dell'Oro (airfields all on the eastern lowlands)

== See also ==
- History of Corsica
- Italian irredentism in Corsica
- Italian occupation of France during World War II
- Military history of Italy during World War II
- Royal Italian Army (1940–1946)
- Simon Petru Cristofini
- Petru Giovacchini
