= Giacomo Carboni =

Italian general (1889–1973)

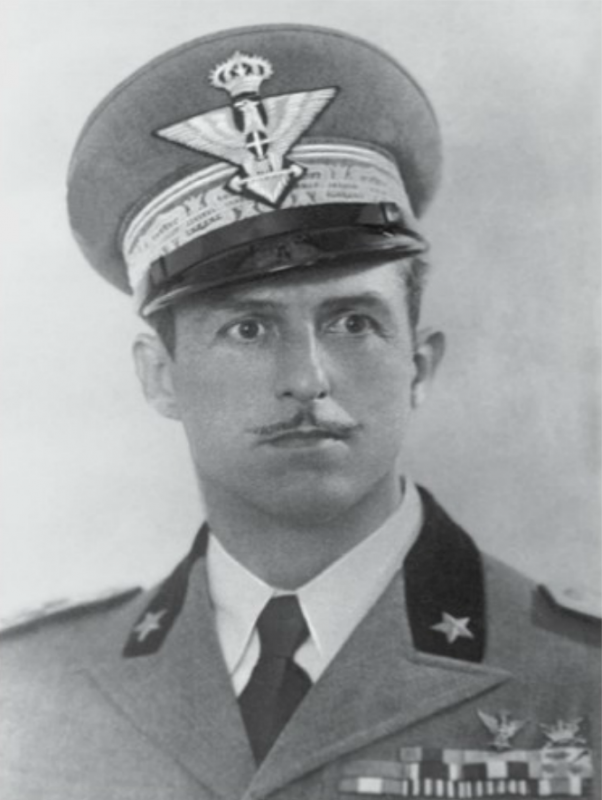
- Carboni c. 1940

Chief of the Servizio Informazioni Militare
- In office 3 November 1939 – 20 September 1940
- Preceded by: Donato Tripiccione
- Succeeded by: Cesare Amè

Military Governor of Corsica
- In office 30 November 1942 – February 1943
- Preceded by: Umberto Mondino
- Succeeded by: Giovanni Magli

Personal details
- Born: 29 April 1889 Reggio Emilia, Kingdom of Italy
- Died: 2 December 1973 (aged 84) Rome, Italy
- Party: Italian Communist Party (post-WWII)
- Education: Military Academy of Modena
- Profession: Military officer

Military service
- Allegiance: Kingdom of Italy (1912–1946); Italy (1946–1951)
- Branch/service: Royal Italian Army (1912–1946); Italian Army (1946–1951)
- Years of service: 1912–1951
- Rank: Army corps general
- Unit: 22nd Infantry Division "Cacciatori delle Alpi"; 20th Infantry Division "Friuli"; Motorized-Armored Army Corps; SIM
- Battles/wars: Italo-Turkish War; World War I; Battles of the Isonzo; Battle of Vittorio Veneto; Second Italo-Ethiopian War; World War II; Italian occupation of Corsica; Italian campaign

Giacomo Carboni (29 April 1889 – 2 December 1973) was an Italian general who was the commander of Corpo d'armata motocorazzato deployed around Rome in the early days of September 1943.

== Life and career ==
Born in Reggio Emilia, he joined the Modena Military Academy where he was commissioned Sottotenente. Then he fought in the Libyan war. During World War I, he was an officer of the Alpini. In 1936–37, he was commander of the 81st infantry regiment during the Second Italo-Abyssinian War, and in 1939, he was Vice Commander of Cacciatori delle Alpi division. From September 1939 to June 1940, he was the chief of SIM. As chief of the Italian military secret service, he wrote a series of reports to Mussolini wherein the Italian preparation for the war was described as inadequate. Carboni was dismissed from his post at SIM and was made commander of the Modena Military Academy.

From December 1941 until November 1942, he was commander of the 20 Infantry Division Friuli and in the first half of 1943, he led the VII Army Corps during the Italian occupation of Corsica.

=== Role in 1943 ===
On the eve of the 25 July coup, General Ambrosio named Carboni as head of the Corpo d'armata motocorazzato in charge of the defense of Rome against the Germans and he cooperated in the overthrow of Mussolini. In the days between 2 July and 8 September, he was also named head of the SIM again, and he ordered the arrest of many fascists loyal to Mussolini.

On the night of 7 September, he hosted US general Maxwell D. Taylor and declared to the US counterpart his inability to defend Rome against the Germans due to the weakness of Italian forces. Despite the fact that the divisions in his command were the most modern and largely superior in numbers in the night of 8 September he did not attack the German forces and in the morning of the 9 September Carboni left his post as commander of the army corps and tried to reach the group around King Victor Emmanuel III and Pietro Badoglio. In the late hours of 9 September, he returned to Rome, but his command was ineffective.

After the liberation of Rome, he was under investigation for his role in the failed defence of Rome but was acquitted.
