= Luigi Giorgi =

Luigi Giorgi may refer to:

- Luigi Giorgi (soldier), (1913 – 1945), Italian soldier of World War II
- Luigi Giorgi (footballer), (born 1987), Italian football midfielder or defender
