= Antonin Sertillanges =

French Catholic philosopher and spiritual writer

The Reverend Antonin Sertillanges OP
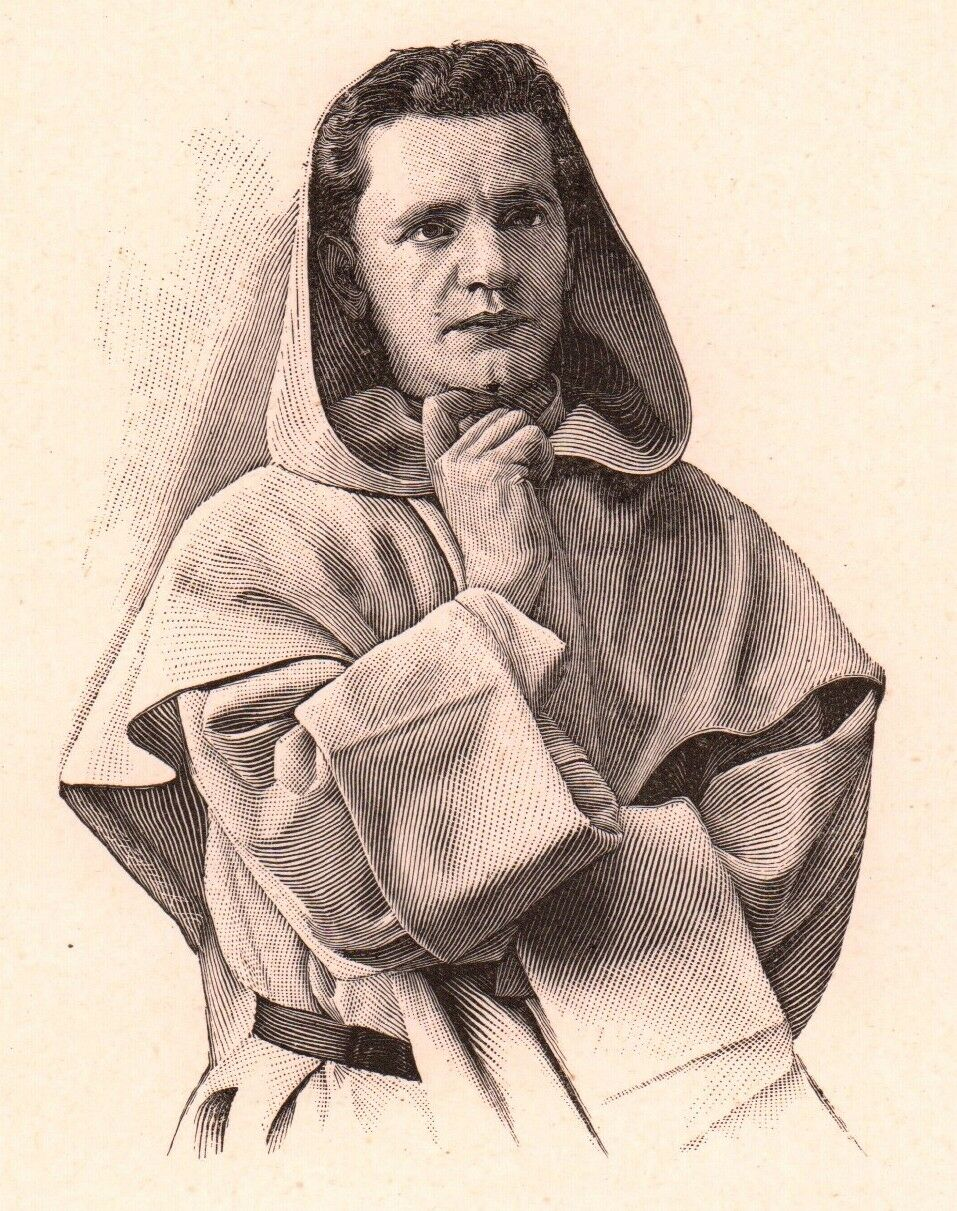
- Born: Antonin-Gilbert Sertillanges; 16 November 1863; Clermont-Ferrand, France
- Died: 26 July 1948 (aged 84); Sallanches, France
- Other name: Antonin-Dalmace Sertillanges
- Occupations: Author, philosopher, priest

Antonin-Gilbert Sertillanges, OP (French: [sɛʁtijɑ̃ʒ]; 16 November 1863 – 26 July 1948), known in religion as Antonin-Dalmace Sertillanges, was a French Catholic philosopher and spiritual writer. He was a member of the Dominican Order.

== Biography ==
Born Antonin-Gilbert, he took the name Antonin-Dalmace when he entered the Dominican Order. He was ordained in 1888 and in 1890 was assigned to teach theology in Corbara, Corsica.

In 1893 he founded the Revue Thomiste and later became professor of moral philosophy at the Institut Catholique de Paris. Henri Daniel-Rops wrote that it was rumored that President Raymond Poincaré asked Léon-Adolphe Cardinal Amette, Archbishop of Paris, for a reply to Pope Benedict XV's peace proposals, and that Amette passed the request along to Sertillanges; in any event, Amette gave his imprimatur to this reply on 5 December 1917, five days before it was made public. In The Heroic Life, Sertillanges had defended Benedict's attitude toward peace, but in "The French Peace", Sertillanges said, "Most Holy Father, we cannot for an instant entertain your appeals for peace."

His scholarly work was concerned with the moral theory of Thomas Aquinas. In the English-speaking world, he is best known for two non-specialist works. The Intellectual Life is a practical guide for how to structure one's life so as to make progress as a scholar. What Jesus Saw from the Cross is a spiritual work that drew upon the time Sertillanges spent living in Jerusalem. Certain of Sertillanges' works are concerned with political theory, French identity and the structure of the traditional French family.

== See also ==
- Thomism

== Works ==
- (1899). L'Art et la Morale.
- (1903). Nos Luttes.
- (1904). La Politique Chrétienne.
- (1908). Agnosticisme ou Anthropomorphisme.
- (1908). L'Art et la morale.
- (1910). Saint Thomas d'Aquin (2 volumes).
- (1919). Paroles Françaises.
- (1921). La vie catholique (2 volumes).
- (1921). La Vie Intellectuelle, son Esprit, ses Conditions, ses Méthodes.
- (1921). L'Église (2 volumes).
- (1921) L'amour chrétien.
- (1928). Les Idées et les Jours: propos de Senex (2 volumes).
- (1930). L'Orateur Chrétien: Traité de Prédication.
- (1941). Hommes, mes Frères.
- (1939-1941) Le Christianisme et les Philosophies (2 volumes).
- (1941-1942) Catéchisme des Incroyants (2 volumes).
- (1941). Blaise Pascal.
- (1941). Henri Bergson et le Catholicisme.
- (1941). Avec Henri Bergson.
- (1943). La Vie Française.
- (1944). La Philosophie de Claude Bernard.
- (1945). L'Idée de Création et ses Retentissements en Philosophie.
- (1946). Les Fins Humaines.
- (1946). La Philosophie des Lois.
- (1948). Le Problème du Mal (2 volumes).
- (1948-1949). Le Pensionnat de Godefroy-de-Bouillon de Clermont-Ferrand, 1849-1945.
- (1962). La Philosophie Morale de Saint Thomas D'Aquin.
- (1963). De la Mort, Pensées Inédites de A.-D. Sertillanges.
- (1965). Regards sur le Monde.
- (1965). L'Univers et l'Âme.

=== Reprints ===
By Sr Pascale-Dominique Nau, OP

- L'Art et la morale, Rome, 2017.
- La vie catholique I & II, Rome, 2017.
- L'Église I & II, Rome, 2017.
- L'amour chrétien, Rome, 2017.

Articles

- (1901). "La Morale Ancienne et la Morale Moderne," Revue Philosophique, 2, pp. 280–292.
- (1902-1903). "Les Bases de la Morale," Revue de Philosophie, pp. 1–23, 138–171, 305–333.
- (1908). "L'Idée Générale de la Connaissance dans saint Thomas d'Aquin," Revue des Sciences Philosophiques et Théologiques, 3, pp. 449–465.
- (1909). "La Providence, la Contingence et la Liberté selon saint Thomas d'Aquin," Revue des Sciences Philosophiques et Théologiques, 1, pp. 5–16.
- (1909). "La Contingence dans la Nature selon Saint Thomas d'Aquin," Revue des Sciences Philosophiques et Théologiques, 4, pp. 665–681.
- (1912). "La Sanction Morale dans la Philosophie de Saint Thomas," Revue des Sciences Philosophiques et Théologiques, 2, pp. 213–235.
- (1920). "L'Idée de Création," Annales de l'Institut Supérieur de Philosophie, 5, pp. 555–570.
- (1921). "La Science et les Sciences Spéculatives d'Après S. Thomas d'Aquin," Revue des Sciences Philosophiques et Théologiques, 1, pp. 5–20.
- (1928). "Note sur la Nature du Mouvement d'Après s. Thomas Aquin," Revue des Sciences Philosophiques et Théologiques, 2, p. 235-241.

Works in English translation

- (1908). Christ Among Men: or, Characteristics of Jesus, as Seen in the Gospel, London: R. & T. Washbourne.
- (1922). The Church, London: Burns, Oates & Washbourne. Reprinted by Cluny Media, 2020.
- (1931). Foundations of Thomistic Philosophy, London: Sands & Co. Reprinted by Templegate, 1956, and Cluny Media, 2020.
- (1933). Saint Thomas Aquinas and His Work, London: Burns, Oates & Washbourne. Reprinted by Blackfriars, 1957.
- (1948). The Intellectual Life: Its Spirit, Conditions, Methods, The Newman Press. Reprinted by the Catholic University of America Press, 1987.
- (1948). What Jesus Saw from the Cross, Dublin: Clonmore & Reynolds. Reprinted by the Sophia Institute Press, 1996.
- (1950). Recollection, McMullen Books.
- (1952). Kinships, McMullen Books.
- (1953). Rectitude, McMullen Books.
- (1954). Spirituality, McMullen Books.
- (1976). Jesus: He is the Unspeakable of Whom Men are Forever Speaking, Dimension Books.
- (1998). Walking with Jesus in the Holy Land, Sophia Institute Press.
