= 10th Heavy Field Artillery Regiment (Italy) =

Inactive Italian Army artillery unit

- 10° Reggimento Artiglieria Pesante Campale
- Active: 7 July 1920 — 8 Sept. 1943
- Country: Kingdom of Italy
- Branch: Royal Italian Army
- Garrison/HQ: Naples
- Motto: "Nullus ictus irritus"
- Anniversaries: 15 June 1918 - Second Battle of the Piave River

Insignia
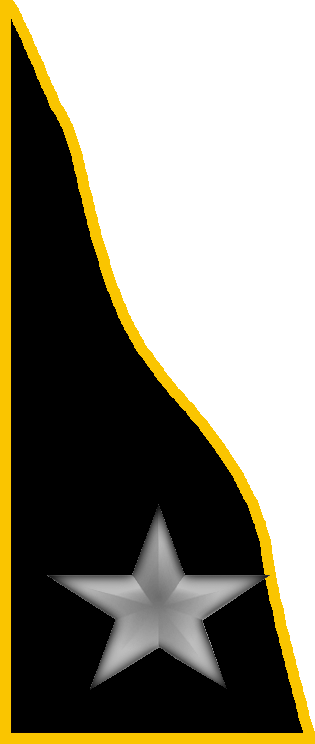
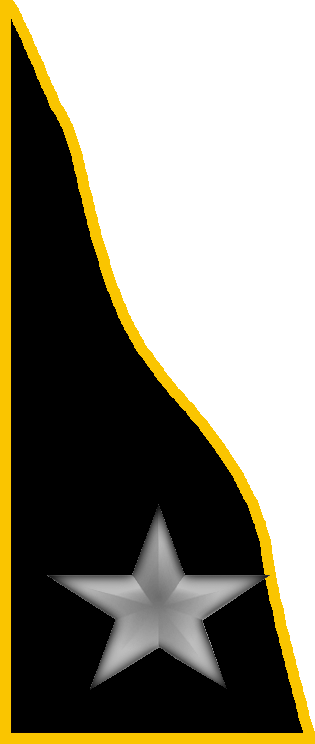
- Regimental gorget patches

The 10th Heavy Field Artillery Regiment (Italian: 10° Reggimento Artiglieria Pesante Campale) is an inactive artillery regiment of the Italian Army, which was last based in Al-Khums in Libya. In 1920, the Royal Italian Army formed twelve heavy field artillery regiments, among them the 8th Heavy Field Artillery Regiment in Naples. In 1926, the regiment was renumbered as 10th Heavy Field Artillery Regiment. In 1939, the regiment moved to Al-Khums in the Italian colony Libya. In the early stages of the World War II the regiment formed the commands of three army corps artillery groupings, two of which participated in 1940 in the Italian invasion of Egypt. In January 1941, the two groupings were destroyed during the British capture of Tobruk. In February 1941, the third army corps artillery grouping formed by the regiment was sent to Libya, where it fought in the Western Desert Campaign and the following Tunisian Campaign, during which it was destroyed.

The regimental anniversary falls, as for all Italian Army artillery regiments, on June 15 1918, the beginning of the Second Battle of the Piave River. This article is about the Royal Italian Army's 10th Heavy Field Artillery Regiment, which was a support unit assigned to a corps-level command. This regiment is unrelated to the 10th Heavy Artillery Regiment, which was a support unit assigned to an army-level command, and unrelated to the 10th Field Artillery Regiment, which was a support unit assigned to a division-level command.

== History ==
=== World War I ===
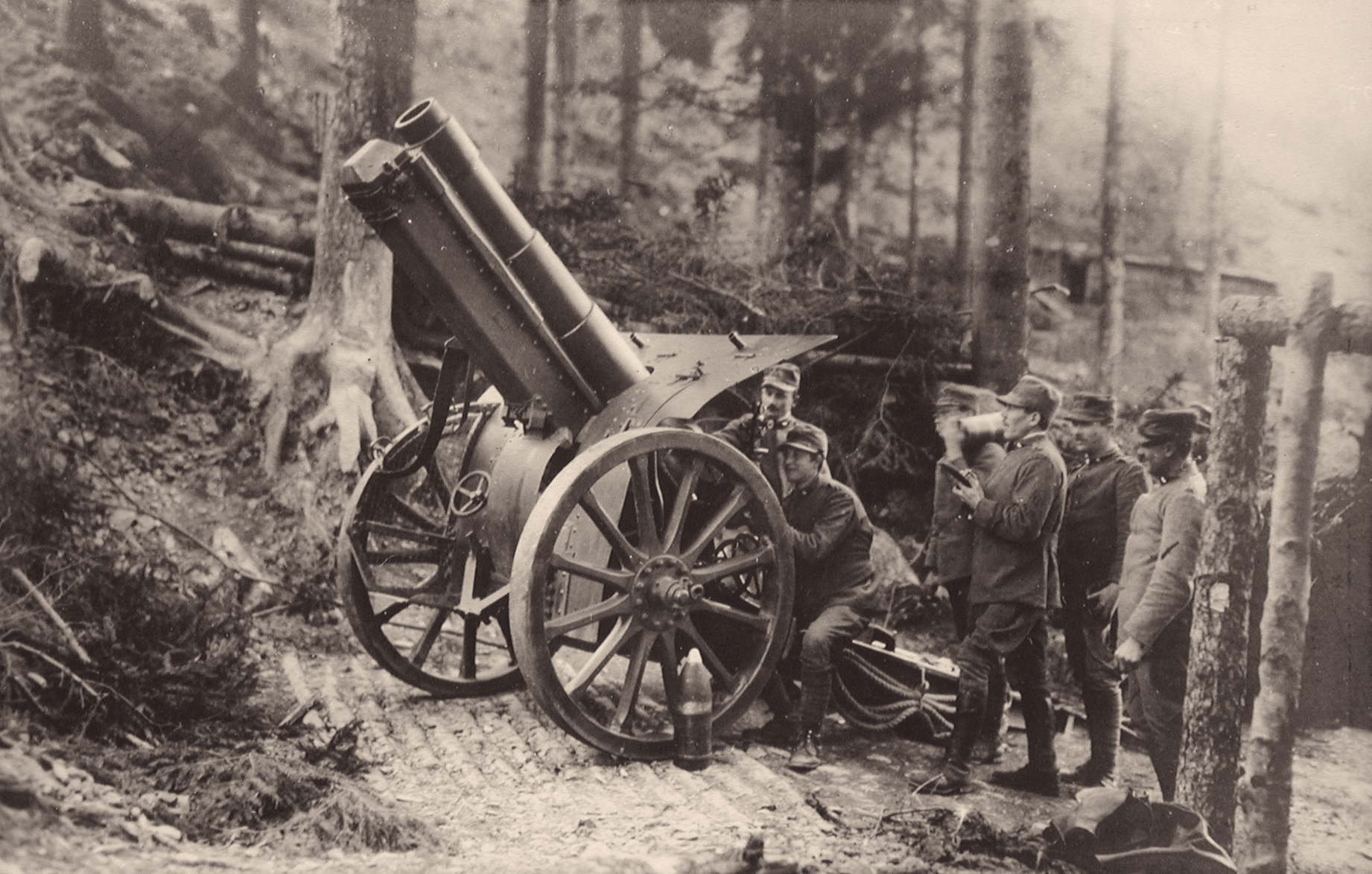
A 149/12 mod. 14 howitzer during the Third Battle of the Isonzo

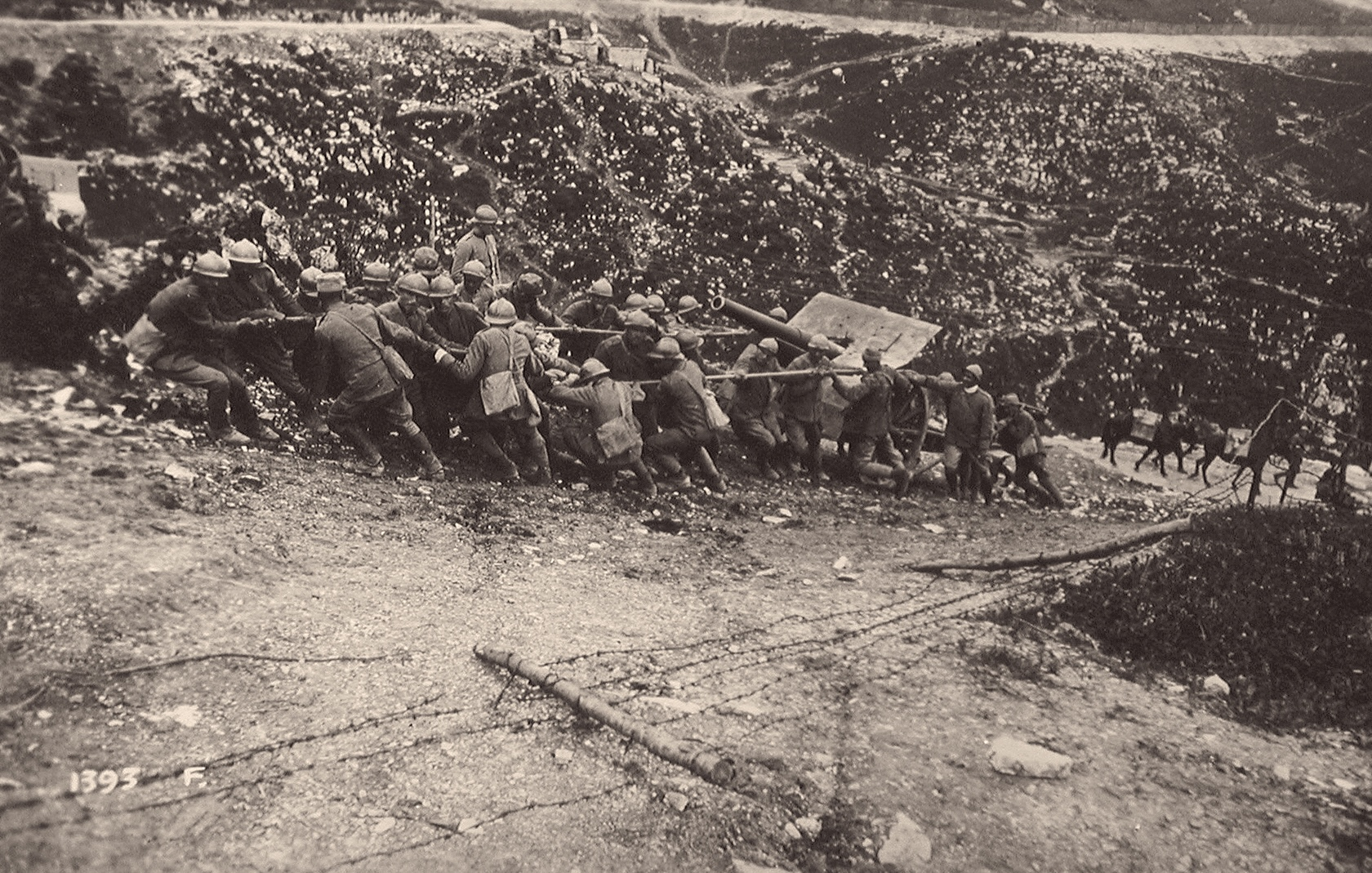
A 105/28 cannon is moved into position

In 1910, the Royal Italian Army decided to form a new artillery speciality, which would be equipped with heavier howitzers than the field artillery's 75/27 mod. 06 field guns and with more mobile howitzers than the fortress artillery's siege mortars and siege howitzers. On 1 April 1912, the Royal Italian Army formed two heavy field artillery regiments: the 1st Heavy Field Artillery Regiment in Casale Monferrato and the 2nd Heavy Field Artillery Regiment in Modena. The two regiments were equipped with 15 cm sFH 13 heavy field howitzers, which Italy had bought from the German arms manufacturer Krupp. Upon entering Italian service the howitzers received the designation 149/12 heavy field howitzer.

In May 1915, when Italy entered World War I, each of the two heavy field artillery regiments fielded six howitzer groups with 149/12 heavy field howitzers. Over the course of the war the two regiments' depots formed three additional howitzer groups and 36 cannon groups, which were equipped with 105/28 cannons, respectively 102/35 mod. 14 naval guns mounted on SPA 9000 trucks. The depots of the Royal Italian Army's field artillery regiments formed additional howitzer groups. To command the heavy field artillery's groups at the front, the two heavy field artillery regiment, formed the commands of nine heavy field artillery groupings, while field artillery regiments formed another 16 heavy field artillery grouping commands.

=== Formation ===
After the end of the war the Royal Italian Army began the process of downsizing its heavy field artillery. However, in November 1919, the army decided to assign a heavy field artillery regiment to each of its 14 army corps. Consequently, in summer 1920, the army formed an additional twelve heavy field artillery regiments, each of which consisted of two cannon groups and two howitzer groups. As part of this expansion, on 1 August 1920, the 24th Field Artillery Regiment in Naples was disbanded and its personnel used to form the 8th Heavy Field Artillery Regiment. On the same date, the 36th Field Artillery Regiment in Messina changed its name to 24th Field Artillery Regiment and received the traditions of the disbanded field artillery regiment. The new heavy field artillery regiment in Naples received the XL Cannons Group, which had been formed during the war by the depot of the 2nd Heavy Field Artillery Regiment, and the XXII Howitzers Group, which had been formed during the war by the depot of the 4th Field Artillery Regiment. The regiment also retained the 24th Field Artillery Regiment's II and III groups, which exchanged their 75/27 mod. 06 field guns with 105/28 cannons, respectively 149/13 heavy howitzers. Upon entering the new regiment the four groups were renumbered and the XL and II groups became the I and II cannon groups with 105/28 cannons, while the III and XXII groups became the III and IV howitzers groups with 149/13 heavy howitzers. The regiment was then assigned to the VIII Army Corps in Naples.

=== Interwar years ===
In 1926, the VII Army Corps in Rome was renumbered VIII Army Corps, while the VIII Army Corps in Naples was renumbered X Army Corps. Consequently, on 1 November 1926, the heavy field artillery regiments were renumbered to better align with their respective army corps: the VIII Army Corps' 7th Heavy Field Artillery Regiment in Rome was renumbered 8th Heavy Field Artillery Regiment, while the X Army Corps' 8th Heavy Field Artillery Regiment in Naples was renumbered 10th Heavy Field Artillery Regiment.

On 20 September 1934, transferred its II Group to the 7th Heavy Field Artillery Regiment. On 1 October 1934, all heavy field artillery regiments were renamed army corps artillery regiment. Consequently, the 10th Heavy Field Artillery Regiment was renamed 10th Army Corps Artillery Regiment (Italian: 10° Reggimento Artiglieria di Corpo d'Armata). In summer 1935, the regiment's depot formed the XV Cannons Group with 105/28 cannons for the Second Italo-Ethiopian War, which on 13 December of the same year, was reorganized as CXV Howitzers Group with 149/13 heavy howitzers and assigned to the 7th Army Corps Artillery Grouping, which deployed to Eritrea and participated in the war's campaign in northern Ethiopia. In March 1936, the regiment's depot in also formed the LI Cannons Group with 105/28 cannons, which was sent to Cyrenaica in Libya for the duration of the war. After the conclusion of the war the CXV and LI groups were disbanded.

=== World War II ===
In April 1939, the regiment formed the 10th Army Corps Artillery Grouping, which consisted of the XVI and XXXII cannon groups with 105/28 cannons and the CXV and CXVI howitzer groups with 149/13 heavy howitzers. The same month, the grouping participated in the Italian invasion of Albania and afterwards remained in the Albania, where it was garrisoned in Tirana. On 1 October 1939, the 10th Army Corps Artillery Grouping was reorganized as Army Corps of Albania Artillery Grouping (26th), which in December of the same year was renamed 26th Army Corps Artillery Regiment. During the same month, October 1939, the regiment moved from Naples to Al-Khums in Libya. After its arrival in Al-Khums the regiment consisted a command, a command unit, the VII Group with 100/17 mod. 14 howitzers, the XVII and XXXV groups with 105/28 cannons, and the 10th Army Corps Specialists Unit. In summer 1940, the regiment reformed the 10th Army Corps Artillery Grouping, which in September 1940 participated in the Italian invasion of Egypt. In December 1940, the British Western Desert Force began Operation Compass, which quickly destroyed the Italian units in Egypt. In January 1941, British forces reached and encircled Tobruk. Among the Italian units encircled in the city were the 10th Army Corps Artillery Grouping and the 25th Army Corps Artillery Grouping, which had also been formed by the 10th Heavy Field Artillery Regiment's depot in Naples. On 22 January 1941, British forces captured Tobruk and the next day, on 23 January 1941, the 10th Army Corps Artillery Grouping and 25th Army Corps Artillery Grouping were declared lost due to wartime events.

During the war the regiment's depot in Naples formed and mobilized the following commands and units:

- Command of the 10th Army Corps Artillery Grouping, which during operations represented the regiment
- Command of the 16th Army Corps Artillery Grouping
- Command of the 25th Army Corps Artillery Grouping
- Command of the 26th Army Corps Artillery Grouping
- VII Group with 100/17 mod. 14 howitzers
- XV Cannons Group with 105/28 cannons
- XVI Cannons Group with 105/28 cannons
- XVII Cannons Group with 105/28 cannons
- XXXV Cannons Group with 105/28 cannons
- XLIX Cannons Group with 105/28 cannons
- CXLIX Howitzers Group with 149/12 howitzers
- 10th Army Corps Specialists Unit
- Command of the CX Artillery Marching Brigade, which managed replacements for operational units at the front
- Command of the CXI Artillery Marching Brigade, which managed replacements for operational units at the front

The groups operated either under command of army corps artillery groupings or as autonomous units. In the evening of 8 September 1943, the Armistice of Cassibile, which ended hostilities between the Kingdom of Italy and the Anglo-American Allies, was announced by General Dwight D. Eisenhower on Radio Algiers and by Marshal Pietro Badoglio on Italian radio. Germany reacted by invading Italy and the 10th Army Corps Artillery Regiment and its depot were disbanded soon thereafter by German forces.

- 10th Army Corps Artillery Grouping: the grouping was mobilized in summer 1940 and consisted of a command, a command unit, the VII Group with 100/17 mod. 14 howitzers, the XVII and XXXV groups with 105/28 cannons, and the 10th Army Corps Specialists Unit. In September 1940, the grouping participated in the Italian invasion of Egypt. On 22 January 1941, the grouping was destroyed during the British capture of Tobruk.
- 16th Army Corps Artillery Grouping: the grouping was mobilized on 16 May 1940 in Naples and consisted of a command, a command unit, and the XV, XVI, and XLIX groups with 105/28 cannons. After its formation the grouping was sent to Friuli as support unit of the Fast Army Corps. In February 1941, the grouping was transferred to Libya to shore up the Italian forces after the British Western Desert Force had captured all of Cyrenaica. The grouping then fought in all the battles of the Western Desert Campaign, and, due to the losses it suffered, changed repeatedly composition. On 24 May 1942, just before the Battle of Gazala, the grouping consisted of two groups with 100/17 mod. 14 howitzers and two groups with 75/27 mod. 06 field guns. After the Axis defeat in the Second Battle of El Alamein, the grouping retreated with the remnants of the German-Italian Panzer Army Africa to Tunisia, where the grouping was assigned to the Italian 1st Army. The grouping then fought in the Tunisian Campaign. On 15 March 1943, the grouping consisted of two groups with 105/28 cannons and one group with German 8.8 anti-aircraft guns. The grouping was heavily attrited in the Battle of Enfidaville and consisted afterwards of just ten guns. On 13 May 1943, the German-Italian Panzer Group Afrika surrendered to the Anglo-American forces and the 16th Army Corps Artillery Grouping ceased to exist.
- 25th Army Corps Artillery Grouping: the grouping's command and command unit were mobilized on 15 October 1940 in Torre Annunziata near Naples. The following month the grouping was transferred to Libya, where it received the CV, CXXX, CXLVIII and CL groups with 149/13 heavy howitzers. The grouping was deployed to Tobruk, where it was destroyed on 22 January 1941 during the British capture of Tobruk.
- 26th Army Corps Artillery Grouping: the grouping was formed in summer 1940 for the 26th Army Corps Artillery Regiment in Albania. Upon arriving in Albania the grouping received the groups assigned to that regiment. The grouping then fought in the Greco-Italian War. After the Greek surrender the grouping remained in Greece on occupation duty. On 1 July 1941, the 26th Army Corps Artillery Regiment formed its own depot in Naples and the responsibility to train the grouping's personnel was transferred from the depot of the 10th Heavy Field Artillery Regiment to the new depot.
