= Jean L'Herminier =

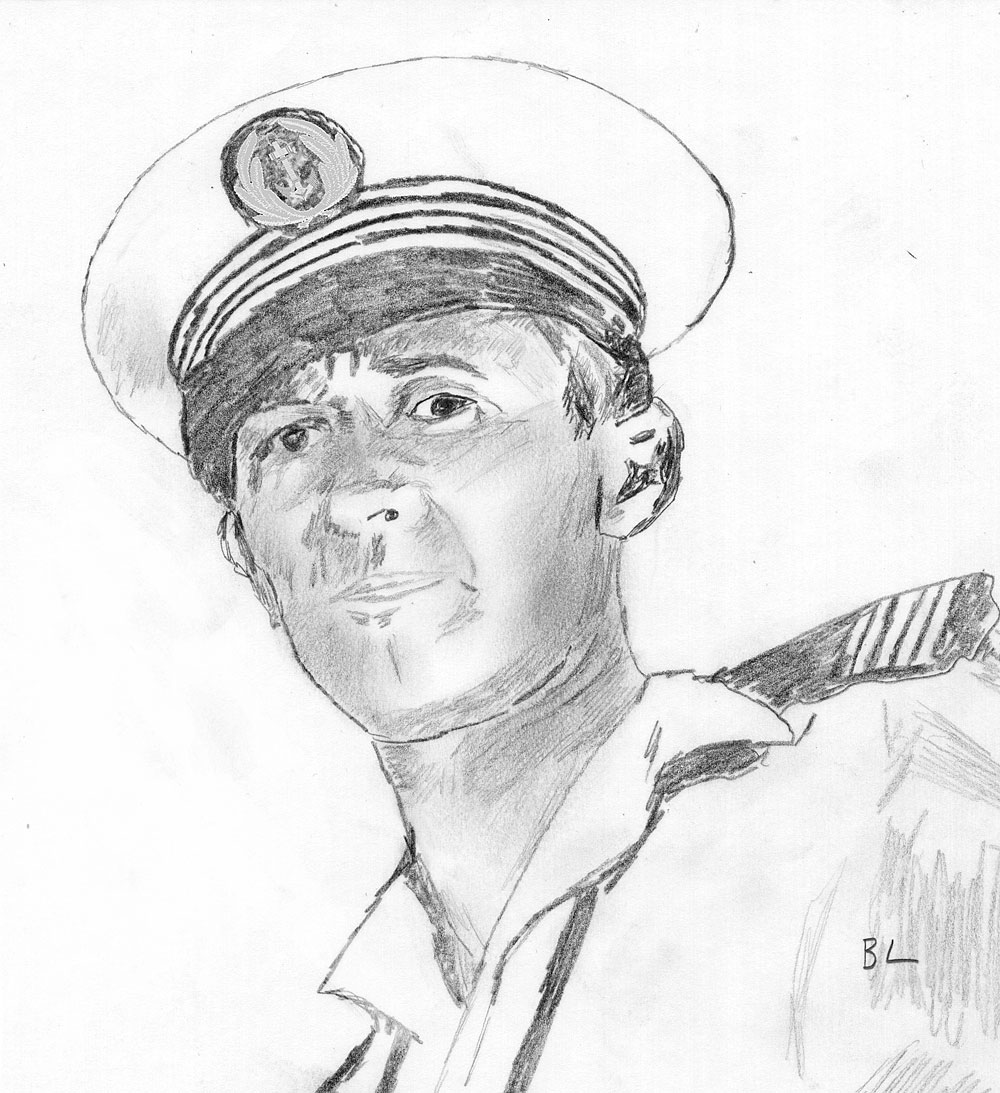
- Born: 25 January 1902; Fort-de-France (France)
- Died: 7 June 1953; Paris
- Resting place: Batignolles Cemetery
- Occupations: Officer of the French Navy, naval officer
- Relatives: Jeanne L'Herminier
- Awards: Chevalier of the Legion of Honour (1932); Officer of the Legion of Honor (1941); Commander of the Legion of Honour (1943); Grand Officer of the Legion of Honour (1949); Grand Cross of the Legion of Honor (1952); Croix de guerre 1939–1945; Croix des services militaires volontaires (1950); Escapees' Medal (1952); Distinguished Service Order (1945); Colonial Medal; mort pour la France

Jean L'Herminier (25 July 1902 - 7 June 1953) was a French naval officer, most notable for his command of the Redoutable-class submarine Casabianca.

== Life ==
=== 1902-1940 ===
Born into a naval family in Fort-de-France, he studied at the Collège Stanislas de Paris before joining the École navale in 1921 and choosing to serve on submarines. He became second in command of the new Redoubtable-class submarine Persée in 1932 and was badly wounded on 26 September that year when its motors exploded during trials. In 1934 he was put in command of the 600 tonne submarine Orphée, followed in 1936 by the 1200 tonne submarine Morse.

At the time of the German offensive in May 1940 he was navigation officer of the Montcalm, a post he had held since 1938. With her he took part in the evacuation of Namsos in Norway. After France surrendered, he remained loyal to Philippe Pétain's new Vichy government, fighting aboard the Montcalm in the defence of Dakar against a Free French and British attack. In November 1940 he took command of another Redoubtable-class submarine, the Sidi-Ferruch

=== 1941-1945 ===
He fell ill in January 1942 and removed from the Sidi-Ferruch and assigned to command the Casabianca, yet another Redoubtable-class vessel. On 27 November 1942, when German forces broke into the naval port at Toulon, the Casabianca was "de relève" (i.e. with personnel and equipment available) rather than "en gardiennage d'armistice" (under armistice caretaking). Low on fuel, the crews of the oil-powered surface ships in the port were unable to escape and therefore had no option but to scuttle rather than be seized, but the diesel-powered submarines were able to sortie almost immediately. Jean L'Herminier chose to sail and break out for the open sea, but was unsure whether to obey his orders from admiral Darlan to scuttle in deep water or to join the Free French naval forces. He discussed the matter with his officers and crew, who favoured the latter option, and so L'Herminier sailed for Algiers, under the control of British and American forces since Operation Torch, which had opened on 8 November that year. Just after the scuttling his sister Jeanne joined the French Resistance - her collection of silhouette drawings of others deported to concentration camps with her such as de Gaulle's niece and Juliette Greco's sister are now in the musée de la Résistance et de la Déportation de la citadelle de Besançon.

At Algiers the submarine was assigned to coordinate with the first resistance networks on Corsica as part of Operation Pearl Harbour, with a view to a French landing. It provided permanent logistical support to the first four agents on the island (Toussaint and Pierre Griffi, Laurent Preziosi and Roger de Saule), notably resupplying the maquis with weapons and then commander commandant Paulin Colonna d'Istria, put in charge of coordinating with the resistance to enable landings by special forces. On 13 September 1943 it landed the first Free French soldiers on Corsica, 109 men of 1st Shock Parachutist Battalion, at Ajaccio, the first city in mainland France to be liberated. The liberation of Bastia on 4 October completed the liberation of Corsica. L'Herminier was promoted to frigate captain in August 1943 but refused to relinquish command until the liberation of Corsica was complete, even after being diagnosed with several thrombosis, leading to the amputation of both legs.

=== Post-war ===
He went to the US for medical treatment from August 1944 to July 1946, but still remained on extraordinary duties and represented the navy on the administrative committee of the Office national des anciens combattants (ONAC). He was promoted to capitaine de vaisseau in December 1945 and made a Grand Cross of the Légion d'honneur on 28 October 1952. He wrote two books of memoirs, Casabianca and Entre ciel et mer, dying in Paris aged 51. He is buried in the 17th division of cimetière des Batignolles in Paris.

== Bibliography (in French) ==
- Isabelle de Saizieu, Jean l'Herminier; Une vie de combats, 2021, 240 p. (ISBN 978-2-9564880-2-6, présentation en ligne [archive])
- Etienne Taillemite, Dictionnaire des marins français, Paris, Editions maritimes & d'outre-mer, 1982, 357 p. (OCLC 8930112).
- Jean L'Herminier, Casabianca, France Empire, 1992 (1ère édition 1949), 256 p. (ISBN 978-2704807048).
