= Jeanne L'Herminier =

French resistance fighter

- Born: Abthée Thérèse Jeanne L'Herminier; 15 October 1907; Nouméa (France)
- Died: 7 March 2007; Vanves
- Other name: Jeannette
- Occupation: French resistance fighter
- Relatives: Jean L'Herminier
- Awards: Resistance Medal (1946)

Jeannette L'Herminier (15 October 1907 – 7 March 2007) was a French Resistance fighter and deportee.

== Life ==
She was born into a naval family at Nouméa and joined the Resistance around the time of the Vichy fleet scuttling itself at Toulon, which her naval officer brother escaped. On 19 September 1943, the Gestapo arrested her and her mother-in-law in Paris for hiding an American airman and belonging to the Buckmaster networks. Jeannette was deported in February 1944 to Ravensbrück concentration camp, a camp for women north of Berlin.

An entirely self-taught artist, she began creating cut-out silhouettes of her fellow prisoners using scraps from newspapers and cardboard boxes recovered in the Holýšov Kommando, a munitions factory where she was a forced-labourer and where she was able to sabotage the ammunition she was building. To escape the horrors of the camp, she embellished her subjects to show them without faces. She produced more than 150 works, created and saved thanks to often-dangerous assistance from the other prisoners, notably Elisabeth Barbier, who got most of the drawings out of Ravensbrück. L'Herminier survived the concentration camp, which was liberated on 5 May 1945.

She was made an officer of the Légion d'honneur and awarded the Croix de guerre 1939-1945 and the Médaille de la Résistance. After recovering most of these drawings post-war, in 1987 she gave them to the Musée de la Résistance et de la Déportation in the Citadelle de Besançon and the Musée de l'Ordre de la Libération in Paris, with the former mounting the first exhibition of them in Strasbourg in 2011, with 71 on show.

She died in Vanves on 7 March 2007.
