= Luigi Giorgi (soldier) =

Italian soldier (1913–1945)

- Born: 7 September 1913; Carrara, Italy
- Died: 7 May 1945 (aged 31); Ferrara, Italy
- Burial place: Camerlona War Cemetery, Italy
- Military career
- Allegiance: Kingdom of Italy
- Branch: Regio Esercito, Italian Co-Belligerent Army
- Service years: 1935–1937, 1939–1945
- Rank: Captain
- Units: 44 Infantry Division Cremona; Gruppo di Combattimento "Cremona"
- Commands: 3rd Company, 21st Infantry Regiment
- Conflicts: Italian Campaign
- Awards: Gold Medal of Military Valor (twice), Silver Star

Captain Luigi Giorgi (7 September 1913 – 7 May 1945) was an Italian soldier of World War II, the only one to receive two Gold Medals in the Italian Campaign and one of very few non-Americans to receive the Silver Star.

== Biography ==
After qualifying as an accountant, Giorgi volunteered for military service and was admitted as a cadet to the Palermo military school in 1935. The following year he was promoted to the rank of Aspirante Ufficiale (Acting 2nd Lieutenant). Assigned to the 21º Reggimento Fanteria, after being commissioned as a Sottotenente (2nd Lieutenant) he was transferred to the Regio Esercito medical school in Florence until he was demobilized in 1937. He was recalled to active duty two years later. When Italy entered World War II (1940), he was serving in the 21º Reggimento Fanteria attached to the "Cremona" Division where he stayed for the duration of hostilities. In the meantime he rose in rank, being promoted to Tenente in January 1940, to Capitano in January 1942 and to leader of the 3rd Compagnia Fucilieri (Rifle Company) in 1943.

On 8 September 1943 he was in Corsica and he participated in the heavy fighting against the Germans. Italian troops, led by General Clemente Primieri, eventually managed to oust their former allies from the island. The "Cremona" Division was later moved to Sardinia for garrison duties. Giorgi remained a member of it when it was turned into the Gruppo di Combattimento Cremona (part of the Italian Co-Belligerent Army). He was noted for being an officer with "a strong personality and ascendancy over his men".

In March 1945, Captain Giorgi took part in operations in the Comacchio area as commander of the 3rd Company of the reformed 21° Reggimento Fanteria, operating on the far right of the British Eighth Army.

It was here that he earned his first Gold Medal for two courageous actions: leading two volunteers, he captured a well-defended German stronghold near Chiavica Pedone (on the left bank of the Reno river) and the following night, he rescued a badly wounded partisan (Menotti Conti, 1925–1959) who was lying in a minefield. He was decorated "in the field" on 6 March at Ravenna, in the presence of the highest Allied military authorities in Italy: Field Marshal Harold Alexander, General Sir Richard McCreery and General Charles Keightley.

During the offensive that would lead to the final breakdown of German and Fascist forces in Italy, Giorgi took command of a small group of soldiers and attacked a withdrawing convoy. The action resulted in the capture of 80 Germans and of the materiel which the trucks were transporting.

He was seriously wounded by shellfire between 26 and 27 April while he was trying to free two fellow servicemen from the rubble of a destroyed emplacement near Croce di Cavarzere. Admitted to the 66th British Field Hospital in Ferrara, he died ten days later.

He received a posthumous second Gold Medal and also a US Silver Star, awarded for "exceptional acts of valor".

== Honours and awards ==
Gold Medal of Military Valour

A company commander, he attacked a well-defended enemy stronghold surrounded by barbed wire entanglements and minefields with the sole escort of two volunteer infantrymen, approaching the enemy installation in full daylight. Leaving the two infantrymen behind, after wading a small creek he single-handedly stormed the fortification still under fire from our artillery and, throwing numerous hand grenades, he wrought panic among the defenders, 19 of whom surrendered. Joined by his platoon, he completed the occupation of the emplacement and, under raging enemy suppression fire, he disregarded his own safety to free two of his men trapped under the rubble of a bombed-out shelter, saving them from certain death. The following night he learned that a soldier from another unit was seriously wounded and lying in a minefield where no one had dared rescue him before defusing the land mines. Crawling alone and touching the terrain palm by palm, after one hour or more of exhausting effort, he managed to save him. [He was a] splendid example of gallantry and of generous selflessness of the Italian people.
Chiavica Pedone (Ravenna), 2–3 March 1945.

Gold Medal of Military Valour

During the days of the grand Spring offensive conducted by the Allied Armies in Italy, he repeated with the same daring and in the same fashion more deeds no smaller than those which had earned him a Gold Medal. In the latest, leading a group of bold soldiers, he fiercely attacked a convoy attempting redeployment and dispersed it with several PIAT shots and hand grenades, capturing 80 prisoners, many vehicles and a large number of arms and ammunition. Again in the lead of his men, he received a wound which would later cause his death. He died peacefully with his last thoughts aimed at his family and country, in the bright satisfaction of having accomplished in full consciousness and absolute modesty his duty as a soldier and Italian, for whom the first Gold Medal was not a point of arrival, but a point of honour to do more and better, as he in fact did.
Senio, Santerno, Po – Croce di Cavarzere, 10–26 April 1945.

Silver Star

== See also ==
Military history of Italy during World War II
Italian Co-Belligerent Army
Gothic Line

== Bibliography ==
- Entry "Luigi Giorgi", in Encyclopedia of anti-fascism and Resistance, pub. by La Pietra, Milan, 1968.
- Arrigo Boldrini, "Diario di Bülow". Pagine di lotta partigiana 1943–1945, Vangelista, Milan, 1985.
- Roberto Roggero, Oneri e onori. Le verità militari e politiche della guerra di liberazione in Italia, Greco e Greco, Milan, 2006.
- Alfonso Magro, 10 aprile 1945. La Liberazione di Alfonsine, in "The second Risorgimento of Italy", n. 2/2007, Year 17, Rome
- Alfonso Magro, 29 aprile 1945. The occupation of Venice, in "The second Risorgimento of Italy", nr. 4/2008, Year 18, Rome [Italian language].
