= Clemente Primieri =

Italian general

- Born: May 12, 1894; Turin
- Died: February 15, 1981 (aged 86); Sanremo
- Burial place: Camerlona War Cemetery, Italy
- Military career
- Allegiance: Kingdom of Italy; Italy
- Branch: Regio Esercito, Italian Co-Belligerent Army
- Service years: 1915–1957
- Rank: Generale di Corpo d'Armata (Lieutenant General)
- Units: 4th Infantry Division Livorno; 44th Infantry Division Cremona; Gruppo di Combattimento "Cremona"
- Commands: 28th Artillery Regiment; 44th Infantry Division Cremona; Gruppo di Combattimento "Cremona"; 4th Alpine Army Corps; Allied Land Forces Southern Europe, Verona
- Conflicts: First World War, Second Italo-Abyssinian War, Italian Campaign
- Awards: Military Order of Italy, Order of Merit of the Italian Republic

Clemente Primieri (12 May 1894 – 15 February 1981) was an Italian general, best known for being the leader of Gruppo di Combattimento Cremona, one of the units of the Italian Co-Belligerent Army which fought alongside the Allies in the latter part of World War II.

== Biography ==
He entered the Modena Military Academy at age 18 and at the end of his course he was assigned to 2nd Mountain Artillery Regiment; at the start of the First World War the unit was sent to the frontline and in 1916 Primieri was promoted to Capitano (Captain) for war merit.
In 1936, as a Tenente Colonnello (Lieutenant Colonel) he took part to the Second Italo-Abyssinian War. In 1937 he became the commander of the 28° Artillery Regiment of the "Livorno" Division.

During the Second World War he was appointed Chief of Staff of the 2nd Army High Command. After the Armistice of Cassibile on 8 September 1943 he took over the 44 Infantry Division Cremona which expelled the Germans from Corsica after heavy fighting. The Division was reformed on 23 July 1944 and became Gruppo di Combattimento Cremona (one of the units of the Italian Co-Belligerent Army), which was positioned on the right flank of the British Eighth Army. Under Primieri's command, the Group followed the northward drive of the Allied Armies and contributed to the liberation of several cities including Portomaggiore, Codigoro, Rovigo, Padua and finally Venice on 2 May 1945.

At the end of the war he remained the commander of the new "Cremona" Division, stationed at Turin.

He was then transferred to the 4th Mountain Army Corps, of which he was commander from July 1952 up till 1954, and later on served in the Verona Allied Land Forces Southern Europe Command.

He died in Sanremo on 15 February 1981 and was laid to rest in the Camerlona War Cemetery in the Comune of Ravenna, alongside the war dead of Gruppo di Combattimento "Cremona".

== Honors and awards ==

Grand Officer of the Military Order of Italy

30 December 1952

1st Class / Knight Grand Cross of the Order of Merit of the Italian Republic 28 November 1957.

Knight of the Military Order of Italy 30 May 1950.

== See also ==
- Luigi Giorgi, a fellow member of Gruppo di Combattimento "Cremona".
