= 7th Heavy Field Artillery Regiment (Italy) =

Inactive Italian Army artillery unit

- 7° Reggimento Artiglieria Pesante Campale
- Active: 1 Aug. 1920 — 8 Sept. 1943; 20 May 1944 — 14 July 1944; 1 Nov. 1987 — 31 Jan. 1991
- Country: Italy
- Branch: Italian Army
- Part of: 5th Army Corps
- Garrison/HQ: Casarsa della Delizia
- Motto(s): "Hostium vim et arma subigere"
- Anniversaries: 15 June 1918 - Second Battle of the Piave River

Insignia
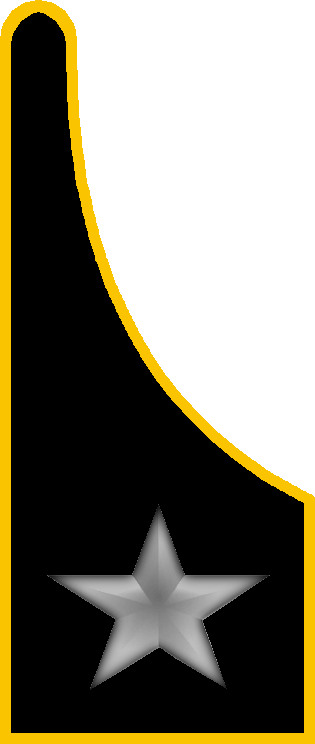
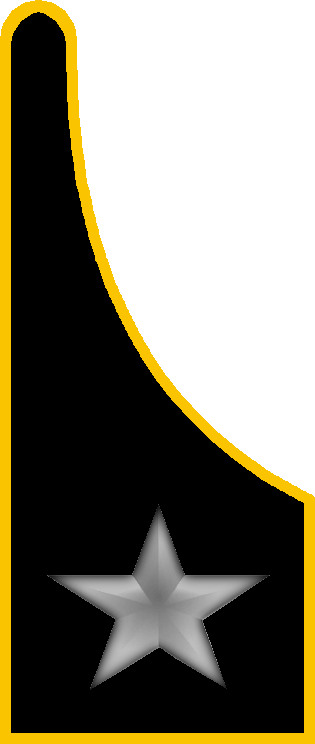
- Regimental gorget patches

The 7th Heavy Field Artillery Regiment (Italian: 7° Reggimento Artiglieria Pesante Campale) is an inactive artillery regiment of the Italian Army, which was last based in Casarsa della Delizia in Veneto and assigned to the 5th Army Corps. Originally an artillery regiment of the Royal Italian Army, the regiment was formed in 1920 with pre-existing groups, which had fought during World War I on the Italian front. During World War II the regiment formed an army corps artillery grouping, which participated in 1940 in the invasion of France and fought in 1941 in the Invasion of Yugoslavia. After the end of operations in Yugoslavia the grouping returned to Italy. In December 1942, the grouping was sent to Corsica on occupation and coastal defense duties. The regiment was disbanded by invading German forces after the announcement of the Armistice of Cassibile on 8 September 1943, while the grouping in Corsica joined the Italian Co-belligerent Army. On 20 May 1944, the grouping was reorganized as 7th Army Corps Artillery Regiment, but already on 14 July of the same year the grouping was disbanded.

In 1976 the Artillery Specialists Group "Ariete" was formed and assigned to the Armored Division "Ariete". In 1986 the division was disbanded, the group was transferred to the Artillery Command of the 5th Army Corps. At the same time the group was renamed 7th Artillery Specialists Group "Casarsa" and assigned the flag and traditions of the 7th Heavy Field Artillery Regiment. In 1991 the group was disbanded and the flag of the 7th Heavy Field Artillery Regiment was transferred to the Shrine of the Flags in the Vittoriano in Rome.

The regimental anniversary falls, as for all Italian Army artillery regiments, on June 15, the beginning of the Second Battle of the Piave River in 1918. This article is about the Royal Italian Army's 8th Heavy Field Artillery Regiment, which was a support unit assigned to a corps-level command. This regiment is unrelated to the 7th Heavy Artillery Regiment, which was a support unit assigned to an army-level command, and unrelated to the 7th Field Artillery Regiment, which was a support unit assigned to a division-level command.

== History ==
On 1 August 1920 the 13th Heavy Field Artillery Regiment was formed in Livorno. The new regiment received four artillery groups, which had fought in World War I on the Italian front. The four groups were the XI Group of the 1st Heavy Field Artillery Regiment, the XVII Group of the 2nd Heavy Field Artillery Regiment, and the I and II groups of the disbanded 32nd Field Artillery Regiment. The XI and XVII were used to form the I and II cannons groups with 105/28 cannons, while the I and II groups were used to form the III and IV howitzers groups with 149/12 howitzers.

On 1 November 1926, the regiment was renumbered as 7th Heavy Field Artillery Regiment. On 1 March 1928, the regiment transferred its I Group to the newly formed 5th Heavy Field Artillery Regiment. In September 1934, the regiment received two groups: one from the 10th Heavy Field Artillery Regiment and one from the disbanded 1st Coastal Artillery Regiment. On 1 October 1934, the regiment was renamed 7th Army Corps Artillery Regiment.

On 10 April 1935, the regiment formed the 7th Army Corps Artillery Grouping for the Second Italo-Ethiopian War. The grouping consisted of a command, a command unit, and three groups with 149/13 heavy howitzers. The three groups, which were designated as CXV, CXIX, and CXXV Howitzer Group, had been formed by the 10th Army Corps Artillery Regiment, 9th Army Corps Artillery Regiment, and 7th Army Corps Artillery Regiment. The grouping was sent to Eritrea and participated in the campaign in Northern Ethiopia. On 1 August 1935, the regiment's depot in Livorno formed the 16th Army Corps Artillery Regiment, which included four artillery groups. After the conclusions of the Second Italo-Ethiopian War the 7th Army Corps Artillery Grouping returned to Livorno, where on 1 September 1936 the 7th Army Corps Artillery Grouping and the 16th Army Corps Artillery Regiment were disbanded.

=== World War II ===
At the outbreak of World War II the regiment consisted of a command and four groups. During the war the regiment's depot in Livorno formed and mobilized the following unit commands:

- 7th Army Corps Artillery Grouping
- XXVI Cannons Group with 105/28 cannons
- XXXIV Cannons Group with 105/28 cannons
- CXXV Howitzers Group with 149/13 heavy howitzers
- CXXVI Howitzers Group with 149/13 heavy howitzers
- 7th Army Corps Specialists Unit

The regiment's depot also formed and mobilized the batteries for the group commands. The groups operated either under command of army corps artillery groupings or as autonomous units. The depot was disbanded by invading German forces after the announcement of the Armistice of Cassibile on 8 September 1943.

- 7th Army Corps Artillery Grouping: the grouping was mobilized at the outbreak of World War II. On 10 June 1940, the day Italy entered the war, the grouping consisted of a command, a command unit, the XXVI and XXXIV cannons groups with 105/28 cannons, the CXXV Howitzers Group with 149/13 heavy howitzers, and the 7th Army Corps Specialists Unit. In this configuration the grouping participated in June 1940 in the invasion of France. Between 11 and 18 April 1941, the grouping participated in the Invasion of Yugoslavia. In December 1942, the grouping was sent to Corsica on occupation and coastal defense duty. In September 1943, the grouping was assigned to the VII Army Corps and consisted of the following units:

- 7th Army Corps Artillery Grouping, in Bastia
  - Command Unit
  - XXVI Cannons Group with 105/28 cannons
  - XXXIV Cannons Group with 105/28 cannons
  - XXXV Howitzers Group with 75/13 mod. 15 mountain guns
  - CXXV Howitzers Group with 149/13 heavy howitzers
  - CXXVI Howitzers Group with 149/13 heavy howitzers
  - CLXXXIV Cannons Group with 149/35 heavy guns
  - 7th Army Corps Specialists Unit

After the announcement of the Armistice of Cassibile on 8 September 1943, the grouping fought the German formations retreating through Corsica. Afterwards the grouping joined the Italian Co-belligerent Army and was transferred to Sardinia. On 20 May 1944, the 7th Army Corps Artillery Grouping was renamed 7th Army Corps Artillery Regiment. The regiment consisted of a command, a command unit, the I and II cannons groups with 105/28 cannons, the III and IV howitzers groups with 149/13 heavy howitzers. On 14 July 1944, the regiment was disbanded and its personnel used to form the 507th Divisional Artillery Regiment for the Grenadiers Division.

=== Cold War ===
During the 1975 army reform the army disbanded the regimental level and newly independent battalions and groups were granted for the first time their own flags. On 31 December 1975 the 132nd Armored Artillery Regiment in Casarsa della Delizia was disbanded and the next day the regiment's Command and Services Battery and the regiment's Specialists Battery formed the Artillery Specialists Group "Ariete", which was assigned to the Artillery Command of the Armored Division "Ariete". The group consisted of a command, a command and services battery, and a specialists battery, which provided weather-ballistic data to the division's two heavy self-propelled field artillery groups and to the artillery groups of the division's 8th Mechanized Brigade "Garibaldi", 32nd Armored Brigade "Mameli", and 132nd Armored Brigade "Manin". At the time the group fielded 290 men (15 officers, 36 non-commissioned officers, and 239 soldiers).

In 1986 the Italian Army abolished the divisional level and consequently the Armored Division "Ariete" was disbanded on 30 September 1986. The next day, 1 October 1986, the Artillery Specialists Group "Ariete" was renamed 7th Artillery Specialists Group "Casarsa" and assigned the flag and traditions of the 7th Heavy Field Artillery Regiment. On the same date the group joined the Artillery Command of the 5th Army Corps. On 13 July 1987 the President of the Italian Republic Francesco Cossiga confirmed the assignment of the flag of the 7th Heavy Field Artillery Regiment to the group.

=== Recent times ===
After the end of the Cold War the Italian Army began to draw down its forces. On 31 January 1991, the 7th Artillery Specialists Group "Casarsa" was disbanded and on 20 February the flag of the 7th Heavy Field Artillery Regiment was returned to the Shrine of the Flags in the Vittoriano in Rome.
