= Gaetano Catalano Gonzaga =

Italian admiral

- Gaetano Catalano Gonzaga in 1929
- Born: 21 January 1893; Naples, Kingdom of Italy
- Died: 1 July 1977 (aged 84); Rome, Italy
- Military career
- Allegiance: Kingdom of Italy
- Branch: Regia Marina
- Service years: 1914-1946
- Rank: Admiral
- Commands: F 7 (submarine); Giovanni Da Verrazzano (destroyer); Bartolomeo Colleoni (light cruiser); Bolzano (heavy cruiser); Northern Aegean High Naval Command; Corsica Naval Command; 5th Battleship Division
- Conflicts: World War I; Spanish Civil War; World War II; Battle of Punta Stilo
- Awards: Silver Medal of Military Valor; Silver Medal of Military Valor (four times); War Merit Cross (twice); Order of the Crown of Italy; Order of Saints Maurice and Lazarus; Colonial Order of the Star of Italy

Gaetano Catalano Gonzaga, Duke of Cirella (21 January 1893 – 1 July 1977) was an Italian admiral during World War II.

== Biography ==
=== Early life and career ===
Gaetano Catalano Gonzaga was born in Naples on 21 January 1893, the son of Arturo Catalano Gonzaga and Marta Feraud. The first of four brothers (Gaetano, Fabrizio, Adriano and Clemente), he was the last Catalano Gonzaga to live in the Cirella Palace in Naples. After his studies, in 1911 he entered the Naval Academy of Livorno, graduating shortly before World War I. He soon joined the Air Service of the Royal Italian Navy, being assigned to airships; during the war he participated in bombing raids on Pola, the main naval base of the Austro-Hungarian Empire, on board the airship P 4. After obtaining an airship pilot's license in 1916, on 15 June 1918 he became executive officer on an airship.

After the end of the Great War, he left the dirigibles in 1920 to become executive officer on the protected cruiser Puglia. On 12 July 1920 he was injured in Split during the anti-Italian incidents that led to the killing of Puglia's commanding officer, Captain Tommaso Gulli, and of motorman Aldo Rossi. Catalano Gonzaga was then transferred to the battleship Dante Alighieri, and was in Fiume on 12 September 1919 when the city was occupied by Gabriele D'Annunzio's legionnaires. On 8 January 1921, in Florence, he married Maddalena Cappellini, they had three children, the first of whom, Arturo Catalano Gonzaga (who also became a naval officer), was born on 18 October of the same year. After a period in command of torpedo boats, at the end of 1924 he switched to submarines, taking command of F 7; he spent about eight years in the submarine branch taking, in command of boats and later of submarine squadrons. In 1928 he participated as naval delegate in Italo Balbo's first air cruise in the Western Mediterranean, aboard a Savoia-Marchetti S.55.

In 1931 he was chosen as aide-de-camp to King Victor Emmanuel III, and in 1936, after the outbreak of the Spanish Civil War, he was sent to Spain in command of the destroyer Giovanni Da Verrazzano, to provide naval support and liaison with Nationalist forces. He had meanwhile been promoted to Captain on 21 July 1936. In 1938 he was given command of the light cruiser Bartolomeo Colleoni, sent to Shanghai with the task of protecting Italian citizens and interests in China during the Second Sino-Japanese War. He returned to Italy in late 1939, after the outbreak of the war in Europe.

=== World War II and later years ===
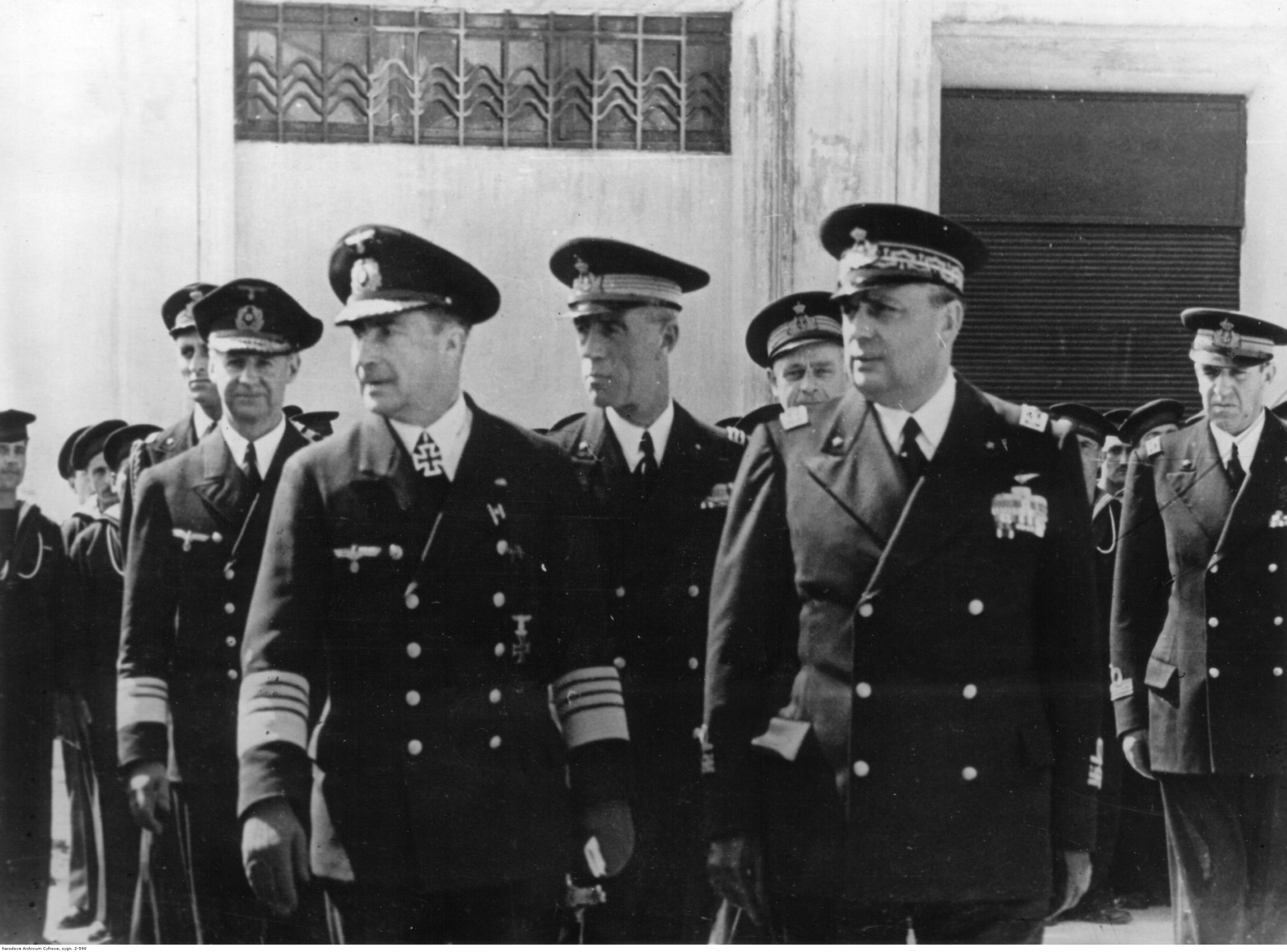
Gonzaga with Kurt Fricke in Athens in 1943.

On his return, Catalano Gonzaga was given command of the heavy cruiser Bolzano, participating in the battle of Punta Stilo on 9 July 1940; in November 1940 he was replaced by Captain Francesco Maugeri at the command of Bolzano, and from January to December 1941 he served as Inspector General for the outfitting of new ships. As such he supervised, among other things, the sea trials of the brand new battleship Roma. On 1 March 1942 he was promoted to Rear Admiral, and on 2 December 1942 he became commander of the Northern Aegean High Naval Command (Marisudest), with headquarters in Athens, also serving as chief liaison between the Regia Marina and the Kriegsmarine in the Aegean Sea. He held this post until 26 July 1943, and on 8 August, after promotion to Vice Admiral, he was appointed naval commander of Corsica, with subordinate commands in Bastia, Ajaccio and Porto Vecchio. He was in Corsica when the Armistice of Cassibile was announced, on 8 September 1943, and was involved in the subsequent fighting between Italian and German forces for the control of the island, which ended with the withdrawal of the last German troops in early October. In the same days, his wife was arrested by the Nazis in Florence and only released thanks to the intervention of then-Monsignor Giovanni Battista Montini, while his son Arturo barely survived the sinking of Roma by the Luftwaffe and was interned in Spain along with other survivors.

Catalano Gonzaga left his post as naval commander of Corsica on 15 November 1943, as the island was taken over by the Free French, and reached Brindisi, where the king and government had moved. On 29 December 1943 he assumed command of the 5th Battleship Division, then interned in Malta, with Duilio as flagship. He returned to Taranto in June 1944, when the 5th Division was allowed to return to Italy, and remained in command of it until 31 August 1946, well after the end of the war. A convinced monarchist, in September 1946 he left the navy following the establishment of the Italian Republic, and retired to private life in his estate in San Casciano in Val di Pesa. He died at the Celio Military Hospital in Rome on 1 July 1977, and is buried next to his wife in the family chapel in Naples.
