= 225th Coastal Division =

Royal Italian Army infantry division during World War II

- Active: 1942–1943
- Country: Kingdom of Italy
- Branch: Royal Italian Army
- Size: Division
- Garrison/HQ: Corbara
- Engagements: World War II

Insignia
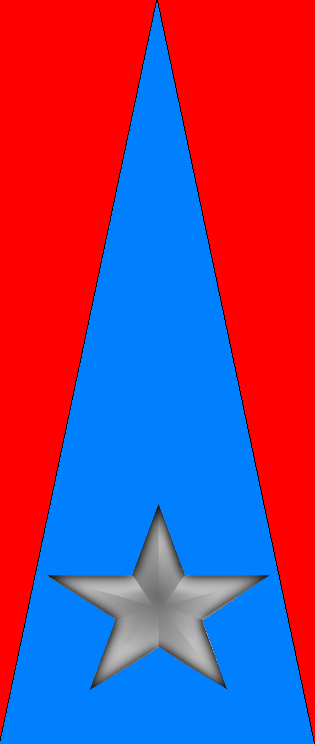
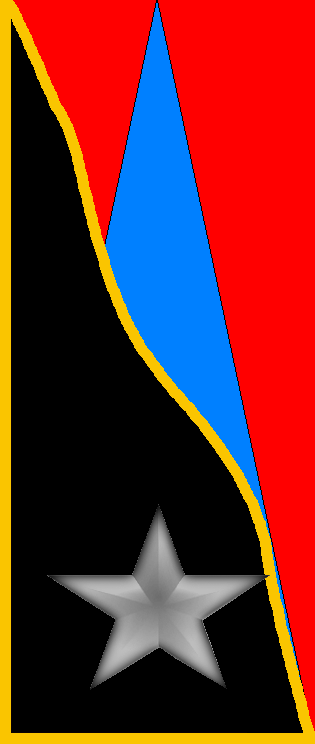
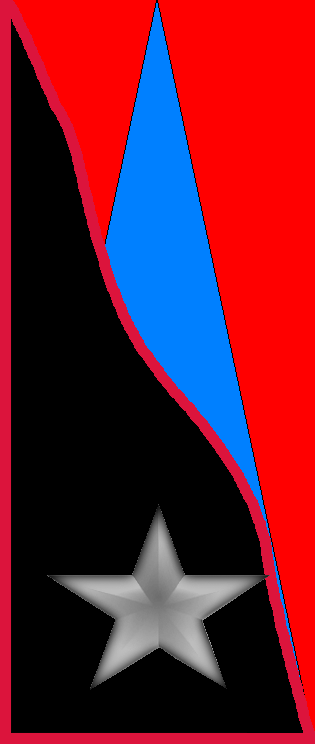
- Identification symbol: 225th Coastal Division gorget patches

The 225th Coastal Division (Italian: 225ª Divisione Costiera) was an infantry division of the Royal Italian Army during World War II. Royal Italian Army coastal divisions were second line divisions formed with reservists and equipped with second rate materiel. They were often commanded by officers called out of retirement.

== History ==
In November 1942 Axis forces invaded Southern France and divided it into a German and an Italian occupation zone. For the coastal defense of the island of Corsica Italy raised on 20 January 1943 the 225th Coastal Division in Pisa and the 226th Coastal Division in Florence. Both divisions were assigned to VII Army Corps and transferred to Corsica in March 1943. The 225th Coastal Division was based in Corbara and responsible for the northwestern coast of Corsica.

After the announcement of the Armistice of Cassibile on 8 September 1943 the division fought, together with the 225th Coastal Division, 20th Infantry Division "Friuli", 44th Infantry Division "Cremona" and local resistance units, the German Sturmbrigade Reichführer-SS and 90th Panzergrenadier Division, which were retreating through Corsica to the harbor of Bastia in the island's north.

On 13 September elements of the Free French 4th Moroccan Mountain Division landed in Ajaccio to support the Italian efforts to stop the 30,000 retreating German troops, but during the night of 3-4 October the last German units were evacuated from Bastia leaving behind 700 dead and 350 POWs. After the end of operations on Corsica the 225th Coastal Division was transferred with all other Italian units from Corsica to Sardinia, where the division was disbanded on 31 May 1944.

== Organization ==
- 225th Coastal Division, in Corbara
  - 172nd Coastal Regiment
    - 2 × Coastal battalions
  - 173rd Coastal Regiment
    - 2 × Coastal battalions
  - 182nd Coastal Regiment (formed 18 April 1943; detached to VII Army Corps)
    - DXXXIII Coastal Battalion
    - DXXXIV Coastal Battalion
    - DXXXVII Coastal Battalion
  - 53rd Coastal Artillery Regiment
    - 5 × Coastal artillery groups
  - 261st Anti-tank Company (47/32 mod. 35 guns)
  - 409th Mortar Company (81mm mod. 35 mortars)
  - 662nd Machine Gun Company
  - 664th Machine Gun Company
  - 225th Mixed Engineer Company
  - 225th Carabinieri Section
  - 225th Field Post Office
  - Division Services

Attached to the division:

- 264th Anti-tank Company (47/32 mod. 35 guns)
- 3rd Company, I Tank Battalion, 33rd Tank Infantry Regiment (L6/40 tanks)
- 2nd Battery, XXVI Artillery Group (105/28 howitzers)

== Commanding officers ==
The division's commanding officers were:

- Generale di Brigata Carlo Gotti (20 January 1943 - 9 May 1943)
- Generale di Brigata Bartolomeo Pedrotti (10 May 1943 - 31 May 1944)
