= 44th Infantry Division "Cremona" =

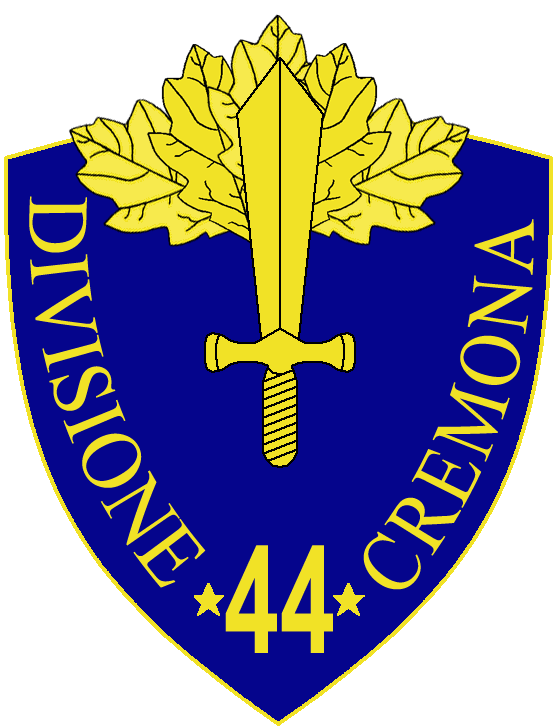
- 44th Infantry Division "Cremona" insignia
- Active: 1939–1945
- Country: Kingdom of Italy
- Branch: Royal Italian Army
- Type: Infantry
- Size: Division
- Engagements: World War II

Commanders
- Notable commanders: General Umberto Mondino; General Nino Sozzani; General Clemente Primieri

Insignia
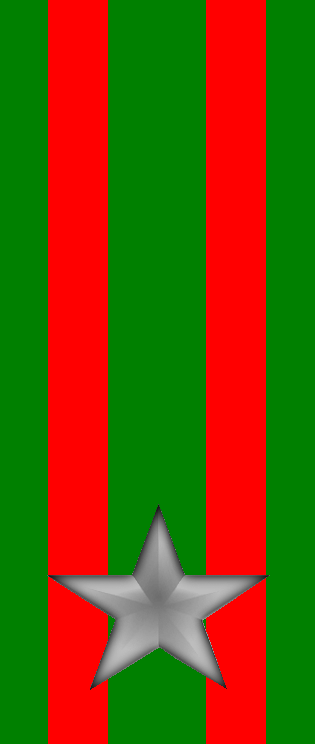
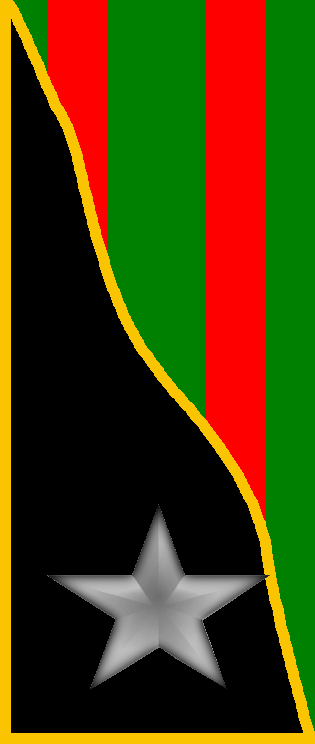
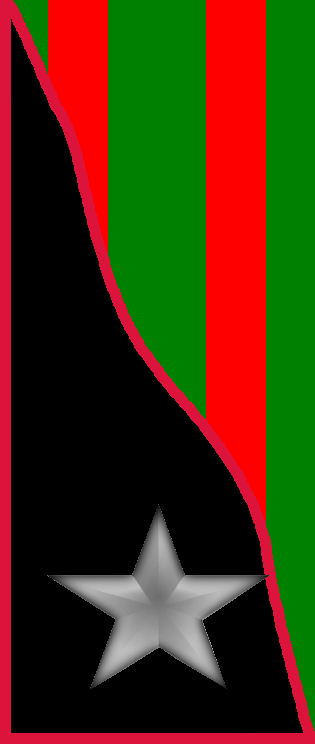
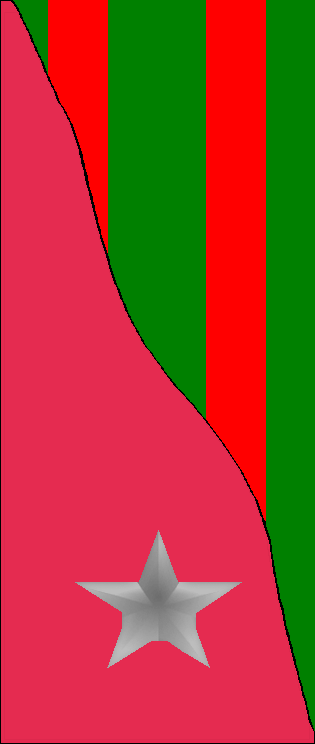
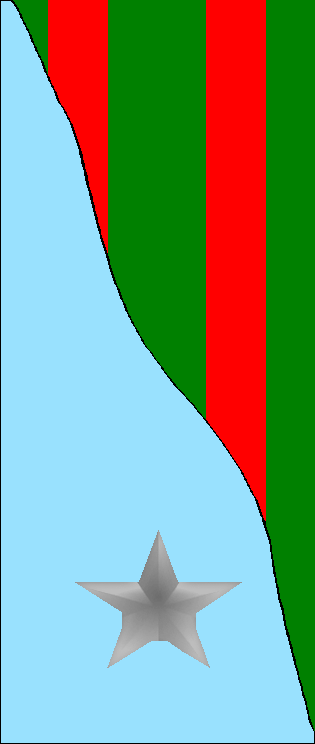
- Identification symbol: Cremona Division gorget patches

The 44th Infantry Division "Cremona" (Italian: 44ª Divisione di fanteria "Cremona") was an infantry division of the Royal Italian Army during World War II. The Cremona was formed on 24 August 1939 by splitting the 20th Infantry Division "Curtatone and Montanara" into the 20th Infantry Division "Friuli" and 44th Infantry Division "Cremona". The division was named for the city of Cremona. The division served as occupation force on Corsica and fought German units after the Armistice of Cassibile was announced on 8 September 1943. The division then served with the Italian Co-belligerent Army and remained active until the 1975 Italian Army reform.

== History ==
After the Second Italian War of Independence the Austrian Empire had to cede the Lombardy region of the Kingdom of Lombardy–Venetia to the Kingdom of Sardinia. After taking control of the region the government of Sardinia ordered the Royal Sardinian Army on 29 August 1859 to raise five infantry brigades and one grenadier brigade in Lombardy. Subsequently on 1 November 1859 the Brigade "Cremona" was activated with the 21st Infantry Regiment and 22nd Infantry Regiment, which had been re-raised on 29 August 1859

=== World War I ===
During World War I the brigade fought on the Italian front, for which its two regiments were each a awarded a Silver Medal of Military Valor.

=== Interwar years ===
On 28 December 1926 the brigade assumed the name of XX Infantry Brigade and received the 88th Infantry Regiment "Friuli" from the disbanded Brigade "Friuli". The XX Infantry Brigade was the infantry component of the 20th Territorial Division of Livorno, which also included the 7th Artillery Regiment. In 1934 the division changed its name to 20th Infantry Division "Curtatone e Montanara". On 24 August 1939 the Curtatone e Montanara transferred all its regiments, except the 88th Infantry Regiment "Friuli", to the newly activated 44th Infantry Division "Cremona" in Pisa. The Curtatone e Montanara was subsequently renamed 20th Infantry Division "Friuli".

=== World War II ===
On 10 June 1940 Italy entered World War II by invading France. The Cremona was in the second echelon near Ventimiglia behind the 5th Infantry Division "Cosseria". The Cremona provided some fire support during hostilities.

==== Sardinia ====
In February 1941 the division was ordered to transfer to northern Sardinia. While the Cremona was in Sardinia its regimental depots in Tuscany raised most units of the 80th Infantry Division "La Spezia": the 126th Infantry Regiment "La Spezia" was raised in Pisa on 5 November 1941 by the 22nd Infantry Regiment "Cremona", while the 80th Artillery Regiment "La Spezia" was raised in Pisa by the 7th Artillery Regiment "Cremona". In parallel the regimental depot of the 88th Infantry Regiment "Friuli" of the Friuli division raised the 125th Infantry Regiment "La Spezia" in Livorno on 5 November 1941.

==== Corsica ====
On 8 November 1942 Allied forces landed in French North Africa and Germany and Italy reacted by occupying Vichy France. On 11 November 1942 the Cremona was ferried from Sardinia to southern Corsica, while its sister division Friuli was ferried from Livorno to northern Corsica. The two divisions, together with the 225th Coastal Division and 226th Coastal Division, were assigned to the Armed Forces Command Corsica / VII Army Corps. On Corsica the Cremona had its headquarter in Ajaccio.

After the Armistice of Cassibile was announced on 8 September 1943 the Italian forces and French partisans on Corsica fought the German Sturmbrigade Reichführer-SS, 90th Panzergrenadier Division, and Italian XXII Paratroopers Battalion/ 184th Infantry Regiment "Nembo", which had crossed over from Sardinia and retreated through Corsica towards the harbor of Bastia in the island's north.

On 13 September elements of the Free French 4th Moroccan Mountain Division landed in Ajaccio to support the Italian efforts to stop the 30,000 retreating German troops, but during the night of 3-4 October the last German units were evacuated from Bastia leaving behind 700 dead and 350 POWs. After the end of operations on Corsica the Cremona was transferred with all other Italian units from Corsica to Sardinia. On 15 November 1943, the 90th CC.NN. Legion was renamed 321st Infantry Regiment "Cremona".

==== Italian Co-belligerent Army ====
Now part of the Italian Co-belligerent Army the division was reorganized on 25 September 1944 in Altavilla Irpina as Combat Group "Cremona". The group consisted of 21st and 22nd infantry regiments, 7th Artillery Regiment, and CXLIV Engineer Battalion. The group was commanded by Major General Clemente Primieri. Equipped with British weapons and materiel the group entered the front on 12 January 1945 as part of British V Corps. When allied forces achieved a major breakthrough during the 1945 spring offensive the Cremona advanced towards Venice and liberated the city on 30 April 1945.

After the war the combat group was garrisoned in Turin and on 15 October 1945 the group was renamed Infantry Division "Cremona". For the Cremona's history after World War II see: see Motorized Brigade "Cremona".

== Organization ==
=== 44th Infantry Division "Cremona ===
44th Infantry Division "Cremona" organization in 1940

- 44th Infantry Division "Cremona", in Pisa
  - Headquarters
    - Command Company
    - 60th Carabinieri Section
    - 251st Carabinieri Section
    - 64th Field Post Office
    - 44th Infantry Division Command Transport Squad
  - 21st Infantry Regiment "Cremona", in La Spezia
    - Command Company
    - 3 × Fusilier battalions
    - Support Weapons Battery (65/17 mod. 13 infantry support guns)
    - Mortar Company (81mm mod. 35 mortars)
  - 22nd Infantry Regiment "Cremona", in Pisa
    - Command Company
    - 3 × Fusilier battalions
    - Support Weapons Battery (65/17 mod. 13 infantry support guns)
    - Mortar Company (81mm mod. 35 mortars)
  - 7th Artillery Regiment "Cremona", in Pisa
    - Command Unit
    - I Group (100/17 mod. 14 howitzers)
    - II Group (75/18 mod. 35 howitzers; transferred on 25 December 1940 to the 58th Artillery Regiment "Legnano")
    - II Group (75/27 mod. 11 field guns; transferred on 25 December 1940 from the 58th Artillery Regiment "Legnano"; transferred on 2 August 1941 to the 40th Artillery Regiment "Calabria")
    - II Group (75/13 mod. 15 mountain guns; transferred on 2 August 1941 from the 40th Artillery Regiment "Calabria")
    - III Group (75/18 mod. 35 howitzers; re-equipped with 100/17 mod. 14 howitzers on 12 January 1942)
    - 4th Anti-aircraft Battery (20/65 mod. 35 anti-aircraft guns)
    - Ammunition and Supply Unit
  - XLIV Mortar Battalion (81mm mod. 35 mortars)
  - CXLIV Mixed Engineer Battalion (formed in 1943)
  - 44th Anti-tank Company (47/32 mod. 35 anti-tank guns; replaced in Corsica by the 144th Anti-tank Company)
  - 44th Telegraph and Radio Operators Company (entered the CXLIV Mixed Engineer Battalion in 1943)
  - 77th Engineer Company (entered the CXLIV Mixed Engineer Battalion in 1943)
  - 54th Medical Section
    - 33rd Field Hospital
    - 84th Field Hospital
    - 333rd Field Hospital
    - 1 × Surgical unit
  - 54th Supply Section
  - 119th Autocarrette Section
  - 119th Transport Section
  - 350th Transport Section (joined the division in Corsica)
  - 355th Transport Section (joined the division in Corsica)

Attached to the division from June 1940 to 10 December 1940:

- XXVIII CC.NN. Battalion

Attached to the division from 10 December 1940:

- 90th CC.NN. Legion "Pisa" (renamed 321st Infantry Regiment "Cremona" on 15 November 1943; disbanded 15 September 1944)
  - XC CC.NN. Battalion
  - CXLIII CC.NN. Battalion
  - 90th CC.NN. Machine Gun Company

Attached to the division during 1943:

- Special Grenadiers Grouping
  - 4 × Granatieri di Sardegna battalions
  - XXI Alpini Battalion "Monte Mercantour"/ 175th Mobile Territorial Alpini Regiment
- IV Bersaglieri Cyclists Battalion
- CXIII Machine Gun Battalion
- DXV Mobile Territorial Battalion
- XXXIV Artillery Group (105/28 cannons; formed by the 7th Army Corps Artillery Regiment)
- CXXVI Artillery Group (149/13 heavy howitzers; formed by the 7th Army Corps Artillery Regiment)

Attached to the division on 8 September 1943:

- XIII Tank Battalion L, 4th Tank Infantry Regiment (L3/35 tankettes)
- XXII Alpini Battalion "Monte Granero"/ 175th Mobile Territorial Alpini Regiment
- CVII Machine Gun Battalion
- CXXXI Self-propelled Anti-tank Battalion (Semovente da 47/32 self-propelled guns)
- XXIV Artillery Group (149/28 heavy field howitzers; formed by the 1st Army Corps Artillery Regiment)

=== Combat Group "Cremona" ===
Combat Group "Cremona" organization

- Combat Group "Cremona"
  - Command Company
  - British Eighth Army Liaison Squad
  - 21st Infantry Regiment "Cremona"
    - Command Company
    - 3 × Fusilier battalions
    - Anti-tank Company (QF 6-pounder anti-tank guns)
    - Mortar Company (ML 3-inch mortars)
  - 22nd Infantry Regiment "Cremona"
    - Command Company
    - 3 × Fusilier battalions
    - Anti-tank Company (QF 6-pounder anti-tank guns)
    - Mortar Company (ML 3-inch mortars)
  - 7th Artillery Regiment "Cremona"
    - Command Unit
    - I Group (QF 25-pounder field guns)
    - II Group (QF 25-pounder field guns)
    - III Group (QF 25-pounder field guns)
    - IV Group (QF 25-pounder field guns)
    - V Anti-tank Group (QF 17-pounder anti-tank guns)
    - VI Anti-aircraft Group (QF 40mm anti-aircraft guns)
  - CXLIV Mixed Engineer Battalion
    - 2 × Engineer companies
    - 1 × Teleradio Company
  - Transport and Supply Company
  - Mobile Artillery and Engineer Materiel Depot
  - Medical Section
    - 2 × Field hospitals
    - 1 × Surgical unit
  - Bakers Section
  - Maintenance Workshop
  - 2 × Carabinieri sections

== Commanding officers ==
The division's commanding officers were:

- Generale di Divisione Umberto Mondino (24 August 1939 - 14 February 1942)
- Generale di Divisione Nino Sozzani (15 February 1942 - 2 November 1942)
- Generale di Brigata Gioacchino Solinas (3 November 1942 - 6 August 1943)
- Generale di Brigata Clemente Primieri (7 August 1943 - 25 September 1944)
