= Paulin Colonna d'Istria =

Paulin Colonna d'Istria (27 July 1905 – 4 June 1982) was a French Gendarmerie officer, awarded the Compagnon de la Libération after playing a major part in the liberation of Corsica.

== Early life ==
Colonna d'Istria was born on 27 July 1905 in Petreto-Bicchisano to a career soldier. He trained at the Collège d'Autun then the officer training academy in Saint-Maixent before fighting in the Rif War until 1926.

== Career ==
In 1936, Colonna d'Istria was sent to north Africa and was still there when war broke out with Germany in September 1939. In 1940, learning of the Appeal of 18 June, he joined the Resistance and was sent by Henri Giraud to relieve two of the four first agents from Operation Pearl Harbour who returned to Algeria on 14 March aboard the Casabianca. After coordinating between resistance networks, organising arms drops from the Casabianca and gaining information on enemy positions, the Resistance members Toussaint Griffi and Laurent Preziosi were ordered to meet him in the office of Colonel de Villeneuve, head of the Deuxième Bureau, on rue Charras in Algiers. They provided him with everything needed to make his mission a success, knowing that the Resistance radio operator Pierre Griffi was still in place to help him.

He was secretly landed on the east coast of Corsica by a British submarine on 4 April 1943 and travelled to Niolo, where he set up a temporary command post. Until the island's liberation was completed on 4 October that year, he coordinated and commanded the Resistance movements around the National Front with the aim of enabling landings without imposing a particular political viewpoint on the island's liberation. The National Front rose from 2000 to 12000 volunteers that September and was able to create more than fifty parachute landing zones for arms drops, despite repression by Italian occupying troops. From 9 June to 3 July he returned to Algiers, returning on the Casabianca with 12 tonnes of weapons and other materiel. He joined the National Front's departmental committee and organised the preparatory campaign for the landings. A Corsican uprising began on 8 September, the date of the Cassibile Armistice between the western Allies and the Italians, leading to total liberation three weeks later.

In November 1943 Colonna d'Istria joined the staff of the Free French forces in the United Kingdom and entered Paris on 25 August 1944 as part of General Leclerc's 2nd Armoured Division. After the war, at the rank of lieutenant-colonel, he returned to the Gendarmerie. In 1951 he was elected parliamentary deputy for Algiers, but was soon dismissed from that role. He was made a général de brigade in 1956, taking command of the Gendarmerie in the French Occupied Zone of Germany. His active service ended in 1963.

== Personal life ==
Colonna d'Istria died in Toulon on 4 June 1982 and is buried in Marseille.

=== Honours and legacy ===
The 116th class of the prestigious École des Officiers de la gendarmerie (EOGN) was named after him in 2011.

== Honours ==
- Grand officier de la Légion d'honneur
- Compagnon de la Libération – decree of 16 August 1944
- Croix de guerre 1939-1945 (2 citations)
- Médaille coloniale (with "Maroc" clasp)
- Croix des services militaires volontaires 3ème classe
- Médaille d'or de l'éducation physique et des sports
- Peace of Morocco Medal (Spain)
- Distinguished Service Order (United Kingdom)
