= 226th Coastal Division =

Royal Italian Army infantry division during World War II

- Active: 1942 – 1943
- Country: Kingdom of Italy
- Branch: Royal Italian Army
- Size: Division
- Garrison/HQ: Genoa
- Engagements: World War II

Insignia
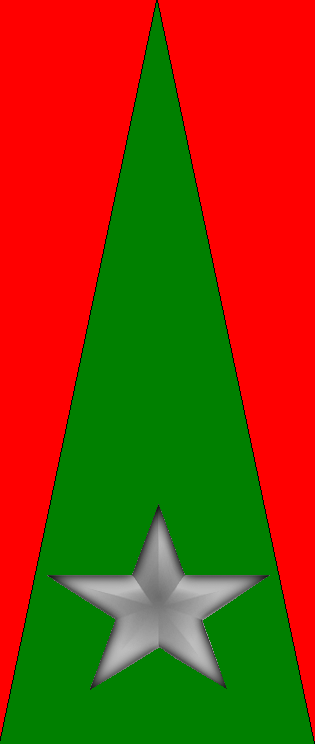
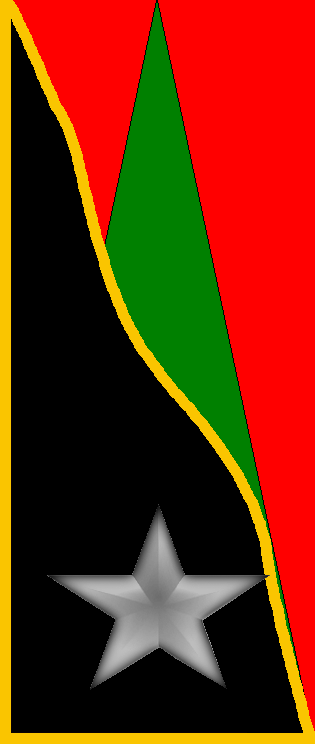
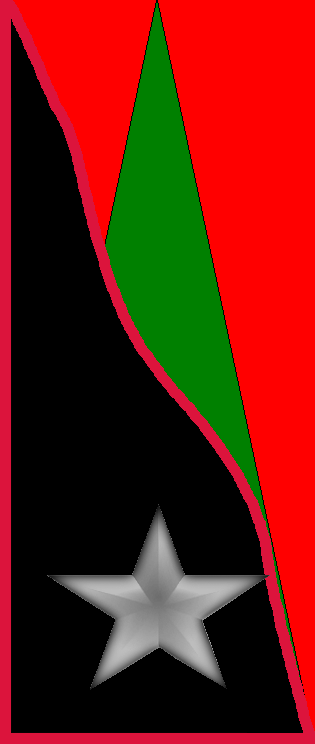
- Identification symbol: 226th Coastal Division gorget patches

The 226th Coastal Division (Italian: 226ª Divisione Costiera) was an infantry division of the Royal Italian Army during World War II. Royal Italian Army coastal divisions were second line divisions formed with reservists and equipped with second rate materiel. They were often commanded by officers called out of retirement.

== History ==
In November 1942 Axis forces invaded Southern France and divided it into a German and an Italian occupation zone. For the coastal defense of the island of Corsica Italy raised on 20 January 1943 the 225th Coastal Division in Pisa and the 226th Coastal Division in Florence. Both divisions were assigned to VII Army Corps and transferred to Corsica in March 1943. The 226th Coastal Division was based in Alata and responsible for the southwestern coast of Corsica.

After the announcement of the Armistice of Cassibile on 8 September 1943 the division fought, together with the 225th Coastal Division, 20th Infantry Division "Friuli", 44th Infantry Division "Cremona" and local resistance units, the German Sturmbrigade Reichführer-SS and 90th Panzergrenadier Division, which were retreating through Corsica to the harbor of Bastia in the island's north.

On 13 September elements of the Free French 4th Moroccan Mountain Division landed in Ajaccio to support the Italian efforts to stop the 30,000 retreating German troops, but during the night of 3-4 October the last German units were evacuated from Bastia leaving behind 700 dead and 350 POWs. After the end of operations on Corsica the 225th Coastal Division was transferred with all other Italian units from Corsica to Sardinia. The division joined the Italian Co-belligerent Army and remained in Sardinia at reduced strength. In July 1944 the division was shipped to mainland Italy, where it was disbanded.

== Organization ==
- 226th Coastal Division, in Alata
  - 170th Coastal Regiment
    - CDLXXXV Coastal Battalion
    - CDLXXXVI Coastal Battalion
  - 171st Coastal Regiment
    - CCCXCIII Coastal Battalion
    - CDLXXXVII Coastal Battalion
  - 181st Coastal Regiment (raised 18 April 1943)
    - CDVI Coastal Battalion
    - DXXXII Coastal Battalion
  - 52nd Coastal Artillery Regiment
    - III Coastal Artillery Group
    - XXVII Coastal Artillery Group
    - LXXVIII Coastal Artillery Group
    - CXIX Coastal Artillery Group
    - CLXXV Coastal Artillery Group
  - 163rd Anti-tank Company (47/32 mod. 35 anti-tank guns)
  - 165th Anti-tank Company (47/32 mod. 35 anti-tank guns)
  - 208th Anti-tank Company (47/32 mod. 35 anti-tank guns)
  - 262nd Anti-tank Company (47/32 mod. 35 anti-tank guns)
  - 410th Mortar Company (81mm mod. 35 mortars)
  - 659th Machine Gun Company
  - 694th Machine Gun Company
  - 697th Machine Gun Company
  - 3rd Carabinieri Company
  - 226th Mixed Engineer Company
  - 580th Transport Section
  - 226th Field Post Office
  - Division Services

Attached to the division:

- Harbor Defense Command Ajaccio, in Ajaccio
  - III Grenadiers Battalion, Special Grouping "Granatieri di Sardegna"
  - Alpini Battalion "Monte Baldo", 175th Mobile Territorial Alpini Regiment
  - II Anti-aircraft Artillery Group (75/27 C.K. anti-aircraft guns)
  - CIII Anti-aircraft Artillery Group (75/27 C.K. anti-aircraft guns)
- 1st Battery, I Artillery Group (100/17 mod. 14 howitzers)
- 3rd Battery, I Artillery Group (100/17 mod. 14 howitzers)
- 11th Battery, CXXVI Artillery Group (149/13 howitzers)
- 344th Anti-aircraft Battery (20/65 mod. 35 anti-aircraft guns)

== Commanding officers ==
The division's commanding officer was:

- Generale di Brigata Attilio Lazzarini (20 January 1943 - July 1944)
