= Giovanni Magli =

Italian general during World War II

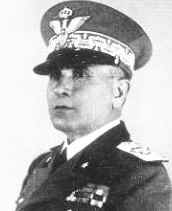
- Born: 27 June 1884; Barcellona Pozzo di Gotto, Kingdom of Italy
- Died: 28 January 1969 (aged 84); Bari, Italy
- Military career
- Allegiance: Kingdom of Italy; Italy
- Branch: Royal Italian Army; Italian Army
- Service years: 1908 – 1957
- Rank: Lieutenant General
- Commands: 83rd Infantry Regiment "Venezia"; 131st Armoured Division Centauro; 37th Infantry Division Modena; VII Army Corps; Armed Forces Command Corsica; Armed Forces Command Sardinia; XIII Army Corps
- Conflicts: Italo-Turkish War; World War I; Second Battle of the Isonzo; Third Battle of the Isonzo; World War II; Greco-Italian War; Battle of Corsica
- Awards: Bronze Medal of Military Valour (twice); Order of the Crown of Italy; Military Order of Savoy

Giovanni Magli (Barcellona Pozzo di Gotto, 27 June 1884 – Bari, 28 January 1969) was an Italian general during World War II.

== Biography ==
Magli was born in Barcellona Pozzo di Gotto on June 27, 1884, the son of Diomede Magli and Antonia Calcagno. After attending the three-year course at the Royal Military Academy of Infantry and Cavalry of Modena, in 1908, he graduated as infantry second lieutenant as the first of his course, and was assigned to the 47th Infantry Regiment "Ferrara".

In 1911 he fought in Libya during the Italo-Turkish War; he remained there even after the end of the hostilities against Turkey, participating in counterguerrilla operational and receiving, in 1913, a decoration for valor. In the same year he briefly taught at the Infantry Application School.

In April 1915 he was captain in the 10th Infantry Regiment "Regina" and with this unit, after the Kingdom of Italy entered the war on 24 May following, he took part in the Second Battle of the Isonzo (from 18 July to 3 August), receiving his first Bronze Medal for Military Valour on 22 July. He became aide to his battalion commander and during the Third Battle of the Isonzo he earned another bronze medal for Military Valor. He was later transferred, for a year and a half, to the General Staff of the IX Corps in the Upper Cordevole Valley, deserving a mention in despatches. After promotion to major he was transferred to the Supreme Command, where he served until the end of the war; there he befriended Ugo Cavallero.

In the early post-war period he was part of the commission charged with drafting the peace treaty with Austria, and was sent to Austria to carry out special assignments; from 1924 to 1925 he commanded of a battalion of the 47th Infantry Regiment, then he returned to the General Staff. After promotion to the rank of lieutenant colonel in 1928 he was Chief of Staff of the Military Division of Messina; in 1932 he became colonel and was given command of the 83rd Infantry Regiment "Venezia".

In 1934 he was appointed Chief of Staff of the XIII Army Corps in Cagliari, and from 1935 he served as Head of the Secretariat and Staff Office of the General Staff in Rome. In 1938 he was in London and Geneva for studies on treaties concerning the troops and the Red Cross.

Also in 1938, after promotion to brigadier general, he commanded the 131st Armoured Division Centauro, which in 1939 was sent to Albania, and in 1940-1941 participated in the Greco-Italian War. During this campaign he was slightly wounded, but maintained command of his division, and later replaced for a month the wounded commander of the 37th Infantry Division Modena, deployed in a critical sector of the front, averting a serious crisis and repelling reiterated Greek attacks; for this he was promoted to Major General for war merit in July 1941.

In February 1941 he was called by the Chief of the General Staff Ugo Cavallero to the Supreme Command as a staff officer; at the end of 1942 he was promoted to Lieutenant General for having carried out the tasks assigned to him in an excellent manner. He was general in charge of the general staff from February 23, 1941, to February 5, 1943.

In March 1943 he was given command of the VII Army Corps, stationed in Corsica for occupation duties, and became commander-in-chief of all Italian armed forces in Corsica, some 80,000 men. 12,000 German troops were also present on the island; on September 4 Magli was instructed, if attacked by the Germans, to expel them from Corsica. This order follows was a consequence of the Armistice of Cassibile that had been signed on the previous day, but was still kept secret until 8 September. Following the announcement of the armistice, after some initial confusion and fruitless negotiations, Magli ordered to attack the Waffen-SS "Reichführer-SS" Brigade; Italian troops fought alongside the Corsican Resistance and, on 14 September, were joined by Free French troops that had been landed in Ajaccio. The fighting ended on 4 October 1943, when the last German troops left Corsica for Italy, having lost some 1,400 men killed or captured. Magli's troops had suffered 700 casualties.

After the withdrawal of Italian troops from Corsica in late 1943, Magli was given command of the Armed Forces of Sardinia and later of the XIII Corps. In 1944 he was made available to the War Ministry for special assignments.

Magli left the Army in 1957, and died in Bari in 1969.
