= Corbara, Haute-Corse =

Corbara
- Commune
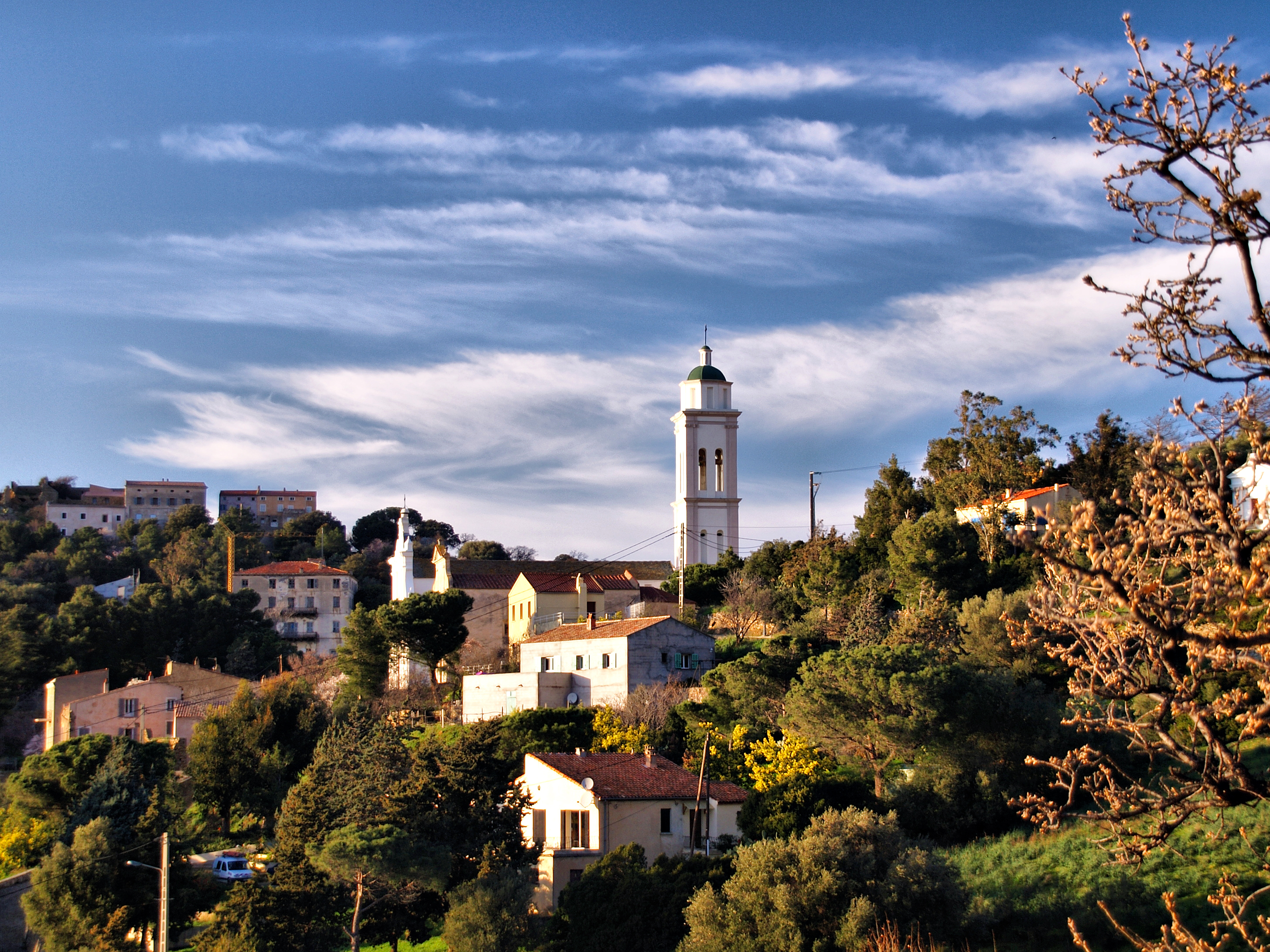
- The Pietralta neighbourhood, in Corbara

- Coat of arms
- Location of Corbara
- Location within France Location within Corsica
- Coordinates: 42°36′55″N 8°54′26″E
- Country: France
- Region: Corsica
- Department: Haute-Corse
- Arrondissement: Calvi
- Canton: L'Île-Rousse

Government
  - Mayor (2020–2026): Paul Lions
- Area^{1}: 10.19 km^{2} (3.93 sq mi)
- Elevation: 170 m (560 ft)
- Highest elevation: 561 m (1,841 ft)
- Lowest elevation: 0 m (0 ft)
- Population (2023): 962
  - Density: 94.4/km^{2} (245/sq mi)
- Time zone: UTC+01:00 (CET)
  - Summer (DST): UTC+02:00 (CEST)
- INSEE/Postal code: 2B093 /20256
- ^{1} French Land Register data, which excludes lakes, ponds, glaciers > 1 km^{2} (0.386 sq mi or 247 acres) and river estuaries.

Corbara (French pronunciation: [kɔʁbaʁa]; Corsican: A Curbaghja) is a commune in the Haute-Corse department of France on the island of Corsica.

== Population ==
Historical population
Year	Pop.	±% p.a.
1968	355	—
1975	366	+0.44%
1982	510	+4.85%
1990	583	+1.69%
1999	706	+2.15%
2007	914	+3.28%
2012	981	+1.42%
2017	907	−1.56%
2023	962	+0.99%
Source: INSEE

== See also ==
- Communes of the Haute-Corse department
