= Umberto Mondino =

Italian general

- Born: 11 February 1883; Rome, Kingdom of Italy
- Died: 22 July 1964 (aged 81); Parma, Italy
- Military career
- Allegiance: Kingdom of Italy
- Branch: Royal Italian Army
- Rank: Lieutenant General
- Commands: 2nd Heavy Field Artillery Regiment; 6th Heavy Field Artillery Regiment; 44th Infantry Division Cremona; XXX Army Corps; VII Army Corps; XXV Army Corps
- Conflicts: Italo-Turkish War; Battle of Zanzur; World War I; World War II; Italian invasion of France; Operation Anton; Operation Achse
- Awards: Bronze Medal of Military Valor; Order of Saints Maurice and Lazarus; Order of the Crown of Italy

Umberto Mondino, also known as Uberto Mondino (Rome, 11 February 1883 – Parma, 22 July 1964) was an Italian general during World War II.

== Biography ==
He was born in Rome on 11 February 1883, the son of Piedmontese general Pier Oddone Mondino and of Parmese marquise Beatrice Pallavicino. Extraordinarily tall for his time (almost two meters), he entered the Royal Military Academy of Artillery and Engineers in Turin on 5 October 1901, graduating with the rank of artillery second lieutenant on August 1, 1904. He served in the 1st Fortress Artillery Regiment, the 1st Mountain Artillery Regiment and the 2nd Mountain Artillery Regiment, being promoted to lieutenant and then to captain; in 1911-1912 he took part in the Italo-Turkish War, earning a Bronze Medal of Military Valor during the battle of Zanzur (June 8, 1912).

He then participated in the Great War as a staff officer, being promoted to major and later to lieutenant colonel. During the second half of the 1920s he was commander of the 2nd Heavy Field Artillery Regiment and of the 6th Heavy Field Artillery Regiment, and Deputy Chief of Staff of the Udine Army Corps Command. He was promoted to colonel in 1928, becoming Head of Office of the Turin Army Corps Command; in 1935 he became artillery commander of the same Army Corps. On 1 June 1936 he was promoted to Brigadier General, becoming Chief of Staff of the Army Command of Turin; on 16 March 1939 he was promoted to Major General and on the following 1 September he assumed command of the 44th Infantry Division Cremona, stationed in Pisa and later moved to Ventimiglia and Sanremo.

Following Italy's entry into World War II, on 10 June 1940, he participated in the offensive against France in command of the Cremona Division, which however was kept in reserve and not involved in the fighting. In March 1941 he moved with the "Cremona" to Sardinia, establishing his headquarters in Macomer. On February 21, 1942 he left the command of the division to Brigadier General Nino Sozzani, and assumed command of the XXX Army Corps in Padua, which on June 10 of the same year was renamed VII Army Corps. On 1 July 1942 he was promoted to the rank of Lieutenant General. From 10 November 1942, following the Axis decision to occupy Vichy France, he supervised the Italian occupation of Corsica (Operation C2), encountering no opposition from the meager Vichy French forces and setting up his headquarters in the Italian consulate in Bastia.

On February 12, 1943, he assumed command of the XXV Army Corps stationed in Elbasan, Albania, replacing General Giovanni Vecchi. Immediately after the signing of the armistice of Cassibile, in the night between 9 and 10 September 1943 he lost contact with the two divisions under his command, the 41st Infantry Division Firenze and the 53rd Infantry Division Arezzo, tasked with defending the eastern access routes to Albania from the German advance. The Army Corps command left Elbasan on 14 September, reaching Struga four days later and then Bitolj on 21 September, where it was captured by the Germans. Mondino was then sent to Oflag 64/Z in Schokken, Poland, where he remained until February 1945, when he was freed by the advancing Red Army. He returned to Italy on the following 10 October.

Transferred to the Army reserve in 1946, he was placed on absolute leave in 1956, and died in Parma in 1964.
