= VII Army Corps (Italy) =

Royal Italian Army corps between 1877 and 1944

The VII Army Corps (Italian: VII Corpo d'Armata) was a corps of the Royal Italian Army between 1877 and 1944.

== History ==
During the first years of World War II, the VII Corps saw no action.
After the western Allies had landed in French North Africa, the Axis powers reacted with Case Anton to occupy the Zone Libre, the part of France not occupied in 1940. The plan included the Italian occupation of the French island of Corsica which was to be executed by the VII Corps on 11 November 1942.
The Corps remained on Corsica with anti-partisan and coastal defense tasks, until the Armistice of Cassibile. The Corps commander, Giovanni Magli, and most of the Corps' units switched sides and from 13 September to 4 October 1943, in collaboration with French units, fought against the Germans in the Liberation of Corsica.

The Corps remained in Corsica until 20 October 1943, when it was transferred to Sardinia. It was dissolved on 20 September 1944.

== Composition (1943) ==
- 20th Infantry Division "Friuli"
- 44th Infantry Division "Cremona"
- 225th Coastal Division
- 226th Coastal Division

== Commanders ==
- Aldo Aymonimo (1938 – 1940.09.01)
- Vittorio Sogno (1940.09.01 – 1941.04.15)
- Unknown (1941.04.05 – 1941.11.02)
- Vittorio Sogno (1941.11.03 – 1942.06.10)
- Umberto Mondino (1942.06.10 – 1942.11.30)
- Giacomo Carboni (1942.11.30 – 1943.03.18)
- Giovanni Magli (1943.03.18 – 1944.09.20)
