= Henry T. Waskow =

United States Army officer (1918–1943)

Henry Thomas Waskow
- Born: September 24, 1918; DeWitt County, Texas, United States
- Died: December 14, 1943 (aged 25); San Pietro Infine, Italy
- Burial place: Sicily-Rome American Cemetery and Memorial, Italy; 41°27′55.08″N 12°39′30.18″E
- Relatives: Frank Carl August Waskow (father); Mary Goth (mother)
- Military career
- Allegiance: United States
- Branch: United States Army
- Service years: 1939–1943
- Rank: Captain
- Nickname: "Snort"
- Service number: O-407112
- Unit: Infantry Branch
- Conflicts: World War II
- Awards: Hall of Honor, Purple Heart

Captain Henry Thomas Waskow (September 24, 1918 – December 14, 1943) was a United States Army officer, with the rank of captain, memorialized in Ernie Pyle's dispatch "The Death of Captain Waskow," which in turn was faithfully portrayed in the movie The Story of G.I. Joe. The column also publicized the documentary film The Battle of San Pietro, by John Huston, depicting the action in which Waskow died.

Ernie Pyle wrote of Captain Waskow:

In this war I have known a lot of officers who were loved and respected by the soldiers under them. But never have I crossed the trail of any man as beloved as Capt. Henry T. Waskow of Belton, Texas.

== Biography ==
=== Childhood and adolescence ===
Waskow was born in DeWitt County, Texas, the seventh of eight children, by children of German immigrants. His parents were cotton farmers, and moved around in various places in Texas until settling in Belton, Texas, when Henry was two years old. He attended the public schools and graduated from Belton High School in 1935, as president of the student council, receiving top grades and showing a particular aptitude for mathematics.

=== College and early military career ===
He attended Temple Junior College on a scholarship, often commuting by foot from his parents' home, and taking on custodial duties on campus. During his college years, he enlisted in the Texas Army National Guard, in the 143rd Infantry Regiment, part of the 36th Infantry Division with his two older brothers, John Otto Waskow, and August Waskow.

Following his two years in junior college, Waskow was offered a position as a teacher but turned it down to attend Trinity University, which was then in Waxahachie, Texas. He graduated with a bachelor's degree on June 5, 1939, and was offered a job at Belton High School. He turned it down, expecting to be called for full-time military duty.

=== World War II ===
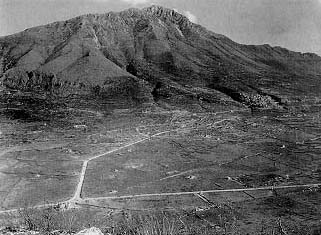
Monte Sammucro and San Pietro, where Captain Waskow was killed in action

When President Franklin D. Roosevelt put the National Guard under federal control and activated the 36th Infantry Division, the Waskow brothers were transferred to Camp Bowie, Texas in January 1941. Waskow was given his commission as a second lieutenant on March 14, 1941 and received training at Fort Benning, Georgia before being assigned to 'B' Company of the 1st Battalion, 143rd Infantry Regiment.

As an officer, Waskow proved to be a principled and compassionate leader, giving those under his command individual attention. He attended various training programs throughout the country before rejoining his unit at Camp Edwards in Falmouth, Massachusetts. While there, he was promoted to captain.

In early April 1943, the 36th Division, commanded by Major General Fred L. Walker, was shipped from New York Harbor to Oran, Algeria, and was then stationed in Rabat in Morocco. Though slated to participate in Operation Husky, the Allied invasion of Sicily, the division was not used in Sicily, and was kept in reserve. On September 9 the 36th Division was landed in Italy as part of Operation Avalanche, the Allied invasion of Italy. The division was landed on Red Beach near the ancient city of Paestum in the Campania as part of the U.S. Fifth Army. Waskow saw combat for the first time in the struggle to hold and enlarge the Salerno beachhead and for the Chiunzi Pass, where he commanded Company 'B'. His brother August was wounded during the battle and sent home. The 36th Division sustained very heavy casualties in the battle, and was held in Fifth Army reserve for the next few weeks, absorbing replacements and training for future combat operations.

Returning to combat in mid-November, Waskow and his men fought their way north past Naples, relieving the 3rd Infantry Division near Mignano and then marched on, largely on mountain trails to Monte Sambucaro (Hill 1205), near San Pietro Infine. The battle for San Pietro was one of the worst of the Italian Campaign. After a week, Waskow's company had been reduced to the size of a platoon, but participated in the assaults. On the evening of December 14, on his way up from the treeline to launch an attack on a ridge known as Hill 730 (41.470°N 13.959°E), Waskow's unit was attacked, with a shell landing near him and his men. Fragmentation hit Waskow in the chest and killed him almost instantly.

=== Ernie Pyle ===
Riley Tidwell, who had been Waskow's assistant throughout the war, left Waskow's body where he had died and went down from the mountain to notify Waskow's superiors that he had been killed. On the way, he encountered Ernie Pyle, the noted war reporter.

Pyle waited the three days it took to recover Waskow's body. It was when the body was unloaded from the back of the mule in the middle of the night along with several other casualties, and his men made their emotional farewells with their commander, that Pyle was inspired to write the dispatch that memorialized Waskow. Pyle's column was published on January 10, 1944 — and soon stacks of letters to Waskow's survivors started arriving in Belton. His sister released a photograph of Waskow taken while he was a lieutenant, after adding another bar to reflect his captain's rank when he died.

Following his wishes, Waskow was buried in Italy. His grave is at the Sicily-Rome American Cemetery in Nettuno. His grave is on Plot G Row 6 Grave 33.

A memorial was held for him in his home town when his mother died a few months later, and he was posthumously awarded the Legion of Merit. He was also awarded the Purple Heart.

== Legacy ==
A few days after witnessing Waskow being brought off the mountain Pyle wrote a column about the event. Pyle had become depressed and had lost confidence in his writing. Asking AP correspondent Don Whitehead to second read his column, he lamented: "I've lost the touch. This stuff stinks. I just can't seem to get going again." Whitehead recognized its tremendous value and urged its publication. A month later, after notification of the next of kin, it was published in Scripps-Howard's home newspaper, the Washington Daily News. With the story featured on the front page, the edition completely sold out. Pyle's column on Waskow was read on the radio in its entirety by Raymond Gram Swing and Arthur Godfrey. It was reprinted in Time magazine, and was used to support a war bond drive.

In his last will and testament, Waskow wrote:

God alone knows how I worked and slaved to make myself a worthy leader of these magnificent men, and I feel assured that my work has paid dividends—in personal satisfaction, if nothing else.... I felt so unworthy, at times, of the great trust my country had put in me, that I simply had to keep plugging to satisfy my own self that I was worthy of that trust. I have not, at the time of writing this, done that, and I suppose I never will.

Pyle's story informed John Huston's documentary The Battle of San Pietro (released in 1945) and heightened interest in it. The character of Captain Bill Walker (played by Robert Mitchum) in William Wellman's motion picture The Story of G.I. Joe is partly based on Pyle's column about Waskow's death. The US Army insisted on changing the surname of Waskow to Walker in the film's screenplay.

Henry T. Waskow High School (Belton New Tech @Waskow) in Belton and VFW Post 4008 are named after Waskow.

Waskow was inducted into the Texas Military Hall of Honor in 1980.

A large white stone memorial to Captain Waskow is located in the side yard of Ernie Pyle's former Albuquerque New Mexico home, now a branch of the Albuquerque Library system, reciting in stone some of Pyle's tribute to Captain Waskow: “I sure am sorry, sir,” said one soldier, his voice trailing off. Another knelt down and, for several minutes, held his friend's hand, lost in thought. Before joining the others as they moved up the road to the next assignment, he paused for an extra moment, to “gently straighten...the points of the captain's shirt collar, and then he sort of rearranged the tattered edges of his uniform around the wound.”
