= Battle of Montecarotto =

World War II battle in Italy

- Part of World War II
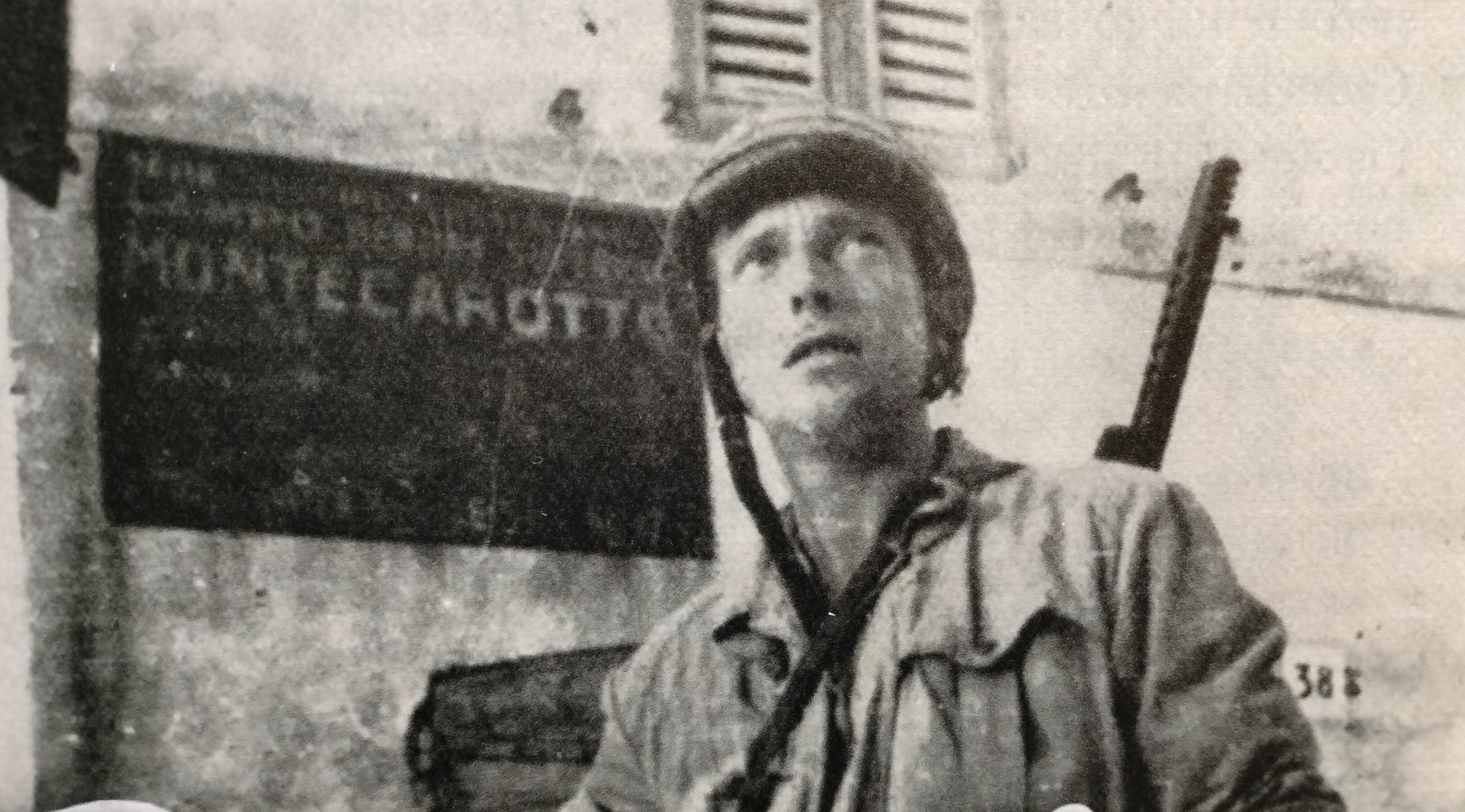
- Contrada S. Pietro, Passage of the Allied front
| Date | July 24 – August 4, 1944 |
| Location | Montecarotto 43.52798°N 13.05850°E |
| Result | Allied victory |

Belligerents
| (Nazi Germany) Wehrmacht | UK British Eighth Army; POL Polish II Corps (Fascist Italy) Italian Liberation Corps; Brigata Maiella; National Liberation Committee |

Commanders and leaders
| (Nazi Germany) Albert Kesselring (Nazi Germany) Wilhelm Raapke (Nazi Germany) Max-Günther Schrank | UK Oliver Leese; POL Władysław Anders (Fascist Italy) Umberto Utili; Ettore Troilo; Ivanoe Bonomi |

The Battle of Montecarotto was a military engagement during the final phase of the liberation of the province of Ancona from the Nazi occupation of Italy during World War II. The battle took place between the Maiella Brigade (a volunteer Italian partisan formation established on December 5, 1943 in the Majella area) and a detachment from the Polish Second Corps (Polish: Drugi Korpus Wojska Polskiego) against the German army, which was determined to trap the Abruzzo formation in a deadly pincer movement.

The battle began on July 24, 1944 and concluded on August 4, 1944. The Maiella Brigade, operating under Polish command, was supported by units from the Italian Liberation Corps (CIL) under General Umberto Utili, as well as partisan forces led by Vice Commander and Field Commander Domenico Troilo.

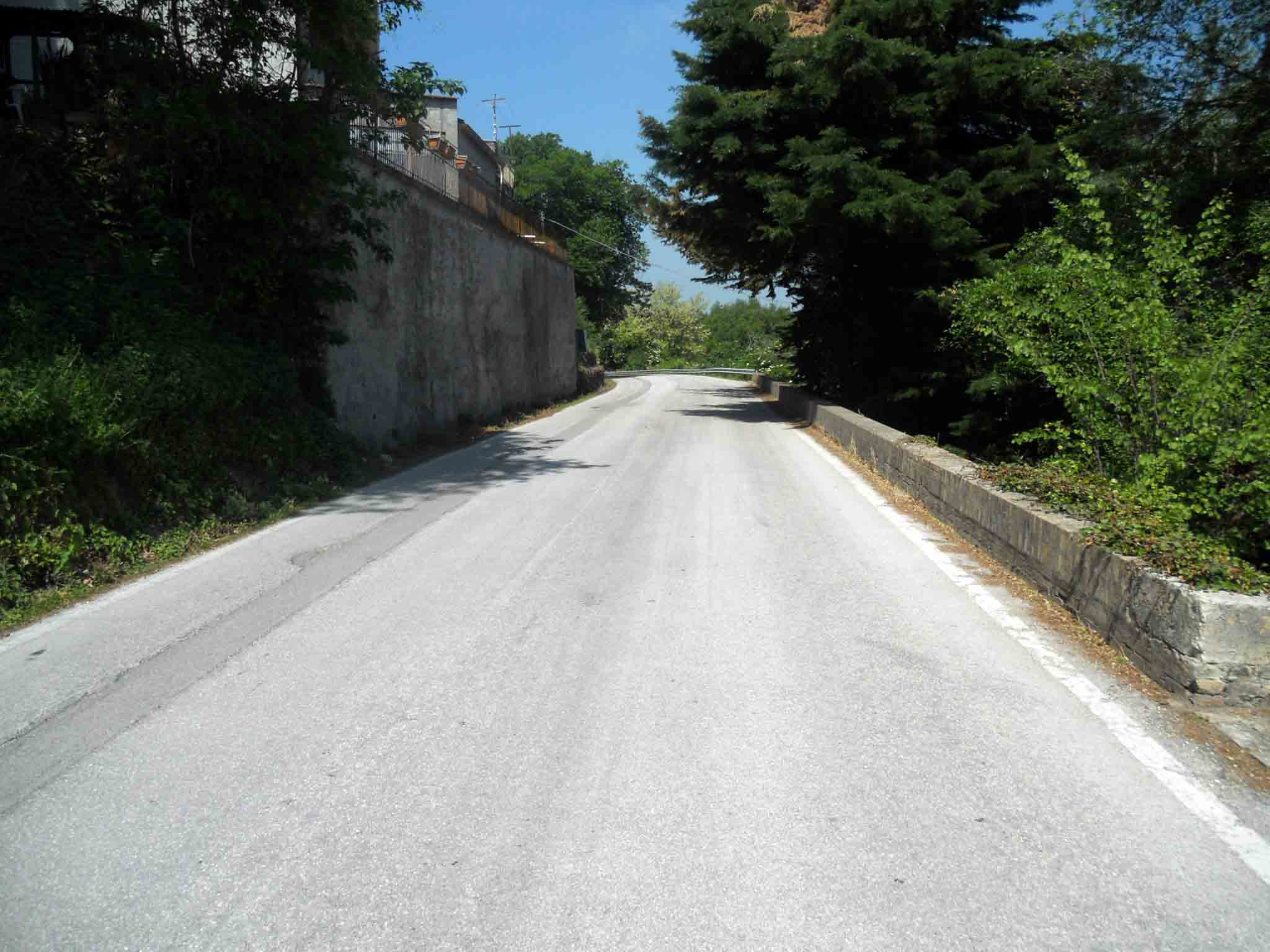
The "Filetto" bridge destroyed by the retreating Germans on July 25, 1944

== The preliminary phase ==
On July 23, two platoons from the Maiella Brigade, following the liberation of Cupramontana, moved to secure the area between Poggio San Marcello, Maiolati Spontini, and Castelplanio. On July 24, Sergeant Giuseppe Bianchi of Vestone, from the 4th platoon, conducted a probe of German positions in Poggio San Marcello. Fighting escalated, and on 25 July, during a firefight near the cemetery, Renzo Sciore of Villalago was killed.

During the night of 25 July the 71st Infantry Division Wehrmacht, commanded by Wilhelm Raapke. demolished the "Filetto" bridge, aiming to hinder the advance of the CIL troops. Following the liberation of Filottrano and Jesi, CIL units were preparing to converge on Montecarotto, which was already being used as a German logistical base. The Wehrmacht withdrew beyond the Misa River, facilitating further Allied movement forward. Allied forces sought to secure the hospital hill, an observation point overlooking the valley north of Montecarotto.

On July 26, observing the German withdrawal, Bianchi advanced to Montecarotto with the platoon led by Lieutenant Jovacini, forming the forward element of the Allied deployment. An observation post was established on the hospital bell tower. Soon after, other personnel from the IV platoon, led by Domenico Troilo, arrived and took command. The hill was garrisoned at strategic locations. That night, initial exchanges of fire occurred with German forces.

The German withdrawal was a calculated move, designed to draw the Abruzzo forces into a more exposed position. Control of the hospital hill offered advantages over both the already liberated Esino River valley to the south and the Misa River valley to the north, which remained under German control. German forces concentrated along the north bank of the Misa in preparation for offensive operations against Montecarotto, including an attempted encirclement.

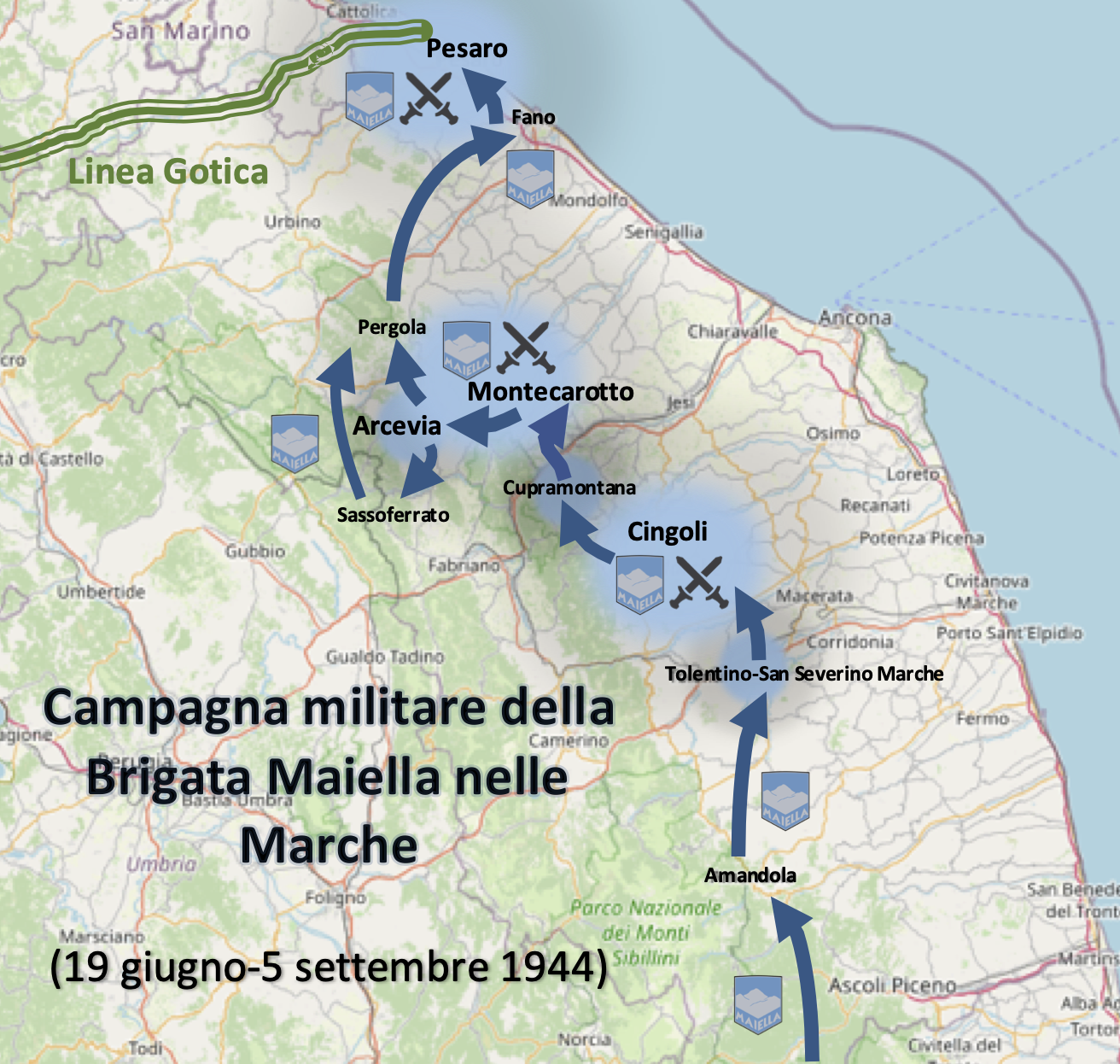
Military campaign of the Maiella Brigade in the Marches, June–September 1944

== The battle begins ==
For two days (from 25 to 26 July), Montecarotto remained largely quiet. Many civilians moved to the Esino valley, which was under Allied control. During this period, artillery fire was reported. On the morning of July 27, 1944, forty soldiers from the “Piemonte” Battalion, who had left Jesi, entered the village. Residents gathered in the piazza in anticipation of liberation, but incoming artillery from 25 artillery pieces positioned in a semicircle north of Montecarotto forced them to take shelter in underground shelters. Artillery fire struck the town throughout the day. According to sources, the resistance force had entered a prepared German position.

=== The battle intensifies ===
Reports circulated of German units operating between Montecarotto and Serra de’ Conti and the partian's realised they had entered a trap. A reconnaissance toward the San Paterniano district was unsuccessful. In the shootout that followed, Amleto Contucci from Sulmona fell. Despite his wounds, Bianchi managed to reach the hospital, but even with the doctors' best efforts, they couldn't save him. The intensity of the battle surged in those frantic hours. The first recon mission to the San Paterniano district failed. The fighting continued to intensify.

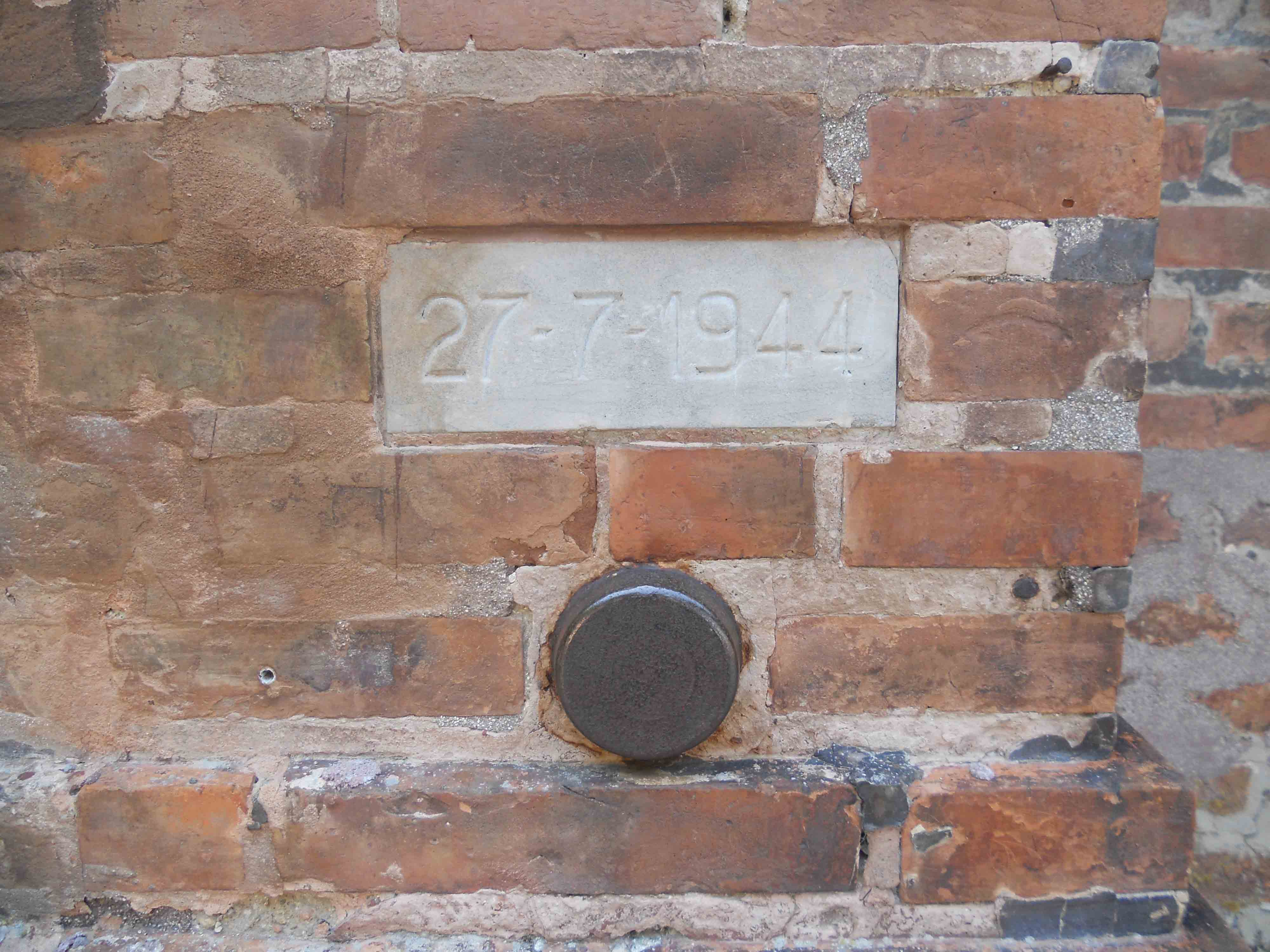
Unexploded German artillery shell on the facade of the "Santissima Annunziata" Church

German units attempted to retake Montecarotto under cover of fire and darkness. British officers known as “Lamb” (likely a code name for a British secret service military) and Lesley Filliter encouraged the defenders not to surrender.

The XIII platoon from Poggio San Marcello moved to assist but was ambushed en route. Most of the platoon withdrew; seven members reached the hospital after passing through German positions.

The IV platoon repelled the assault. German forces mounted further attacks during the night from the west, north, and east. On July 28, artillery fire targeted the town for most of the day. Command of the hospital sector remained with Domenico Troilo and “Lamb,” with the latter acting as a liaison to the rear. In the afternoon, the VIII Maiella platoon arrived in Montecarotto to fortify the cemetery area, identified as vulnerable to a German advance.

In the early evening, a group of German soldiers entered the hospital through the main door; a brief engagement followed, after which the attackers withdrew. Machine‑gun fire then resumed, and the two Abruzzo platoons held their positions against German infantry. The town continued to experience heavy fire. Fears grew of the possible presence of Wehrmacht personnel inside the town and potential assistance from local fascist elements. Polish General Władysław Anders subsequently ordered security sweeps to identify collaborationist activity.

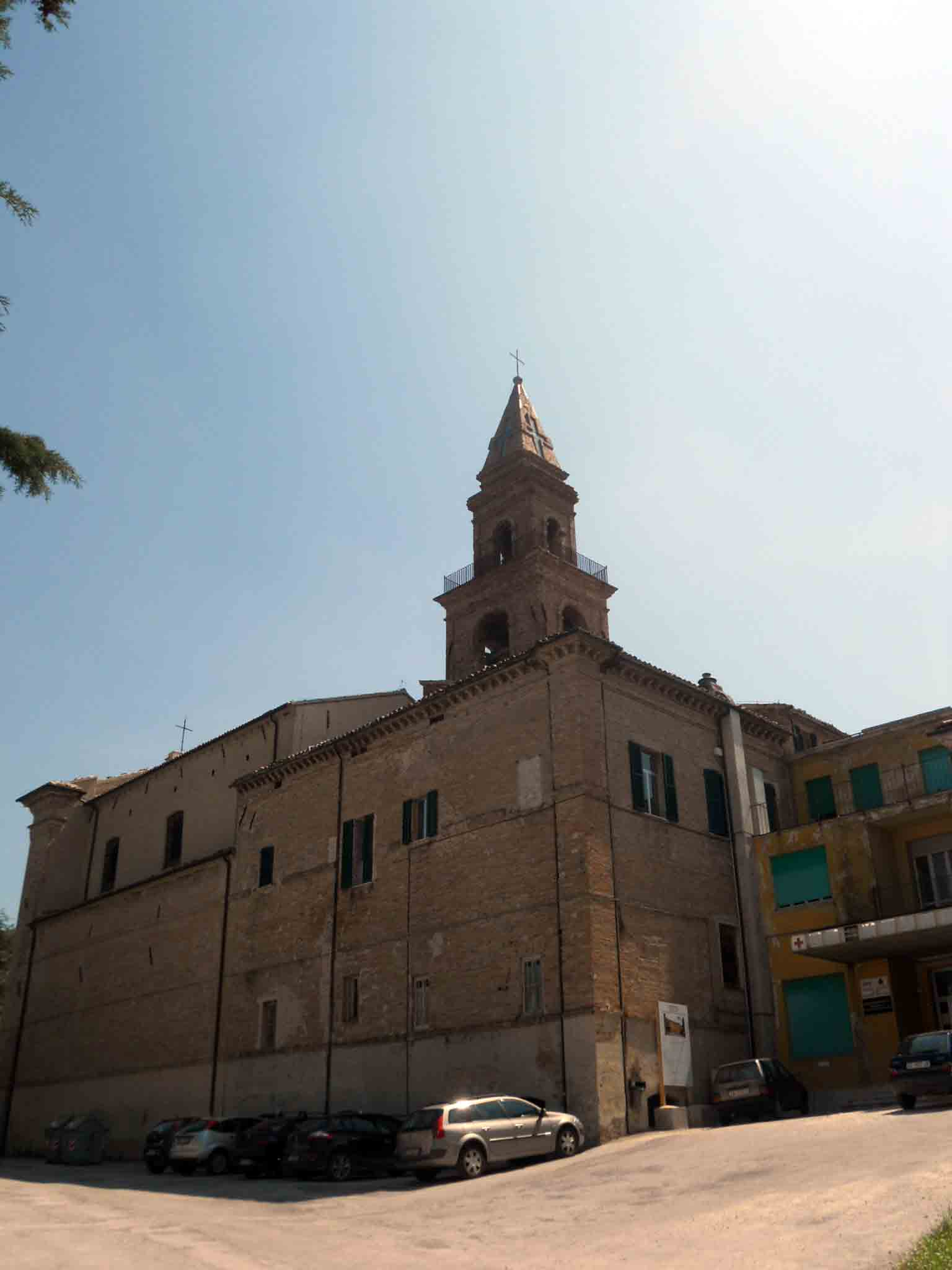
Hospital bell tower defended by the Maiella Brigade

On July 29, after a brief pause, German forces resumed the siege and maintained fire throughout the day, causing civilian casualties. The defenders reported a lack of reinforcements and supplies. On the morning of July 28, Polish Lieutenant Colonel Czarnecki, a liaison officer from the Polish II Corps, arrived. He prepared for night operations while intermediaries urged the defenders to surrender.

Czarnecki conducted a demonstrative maneuver with armored vehicles in an attempt to force the Germans into retreat. Requests were made for additional infantry platoons, an artillery group, and a motorized detachment. Adverse weather hindered most reinforcements from reaching their positions; only the artillery advanced to a range adequate for support.

A subsequent attack was heavier than previous assaults, but German forces did not capture the position. German efforts to encourage civilians to oppose the Italian resistance were unsuccessful. On July 30, five companies of the 184th “Nembo” Parachute Division under General Giorgio Morigi, which until then had been engaged in fighting east of Montecarotto, arrived to relieve the IV, VIII, and XIII Maiella platoons.

== Liberation of Arcevia and Ostra Vetere ==
Following the failed German assault on the Colle dell'Ospedale, the Allied forces in the Adriatic area intensified their advance. The entry of Italian paratroopers allowed the Maiella to concentrate its forces in the western sector, along the Poggio San Marcello-Avacelli-Arcevia axis. It was mainly on Arcevia that the Allied offensive focused, where the 5th Mountain Division, commanded by Major General Max Schrank, was located. German defensive directives aimed to hinder enemy night incursions. Kesselring's German strategy showed increasing signs of difficulty, exacerbated by limited human and material resources on various European fronts. On July 31, a new German assault east of Montecarotto was repelled by the Nembo Division, which managed to keep the front away from San Francesco hill. Local GAPs (Patriotic Action Groups) defended the town during the night. Violent clashes also occurred west of the Misa river, between Pergola and Scheggia, involving the Polish 2nd Corps.

=== The conquest of Arcevia, the expansion of the Maiella, and the German retreat ===
On August 1, fighting resumed between Montale and Piticchio. On August 2, the 14th platoon of the Maiella entered Mergo, opening the way to Arcevia. On August 2, the arrival of the 3rd Carpathian Rifle Division (Poland) in Arcevia proved decisive. An Allied air bombardment, requested by Domenico Troilo, struck German positions in Piticchio and Montale. On the night between August 4 and 5, the Abruzzo forces broke through German defenses, leading to the simultaneous fall of Piticchio and Montale.

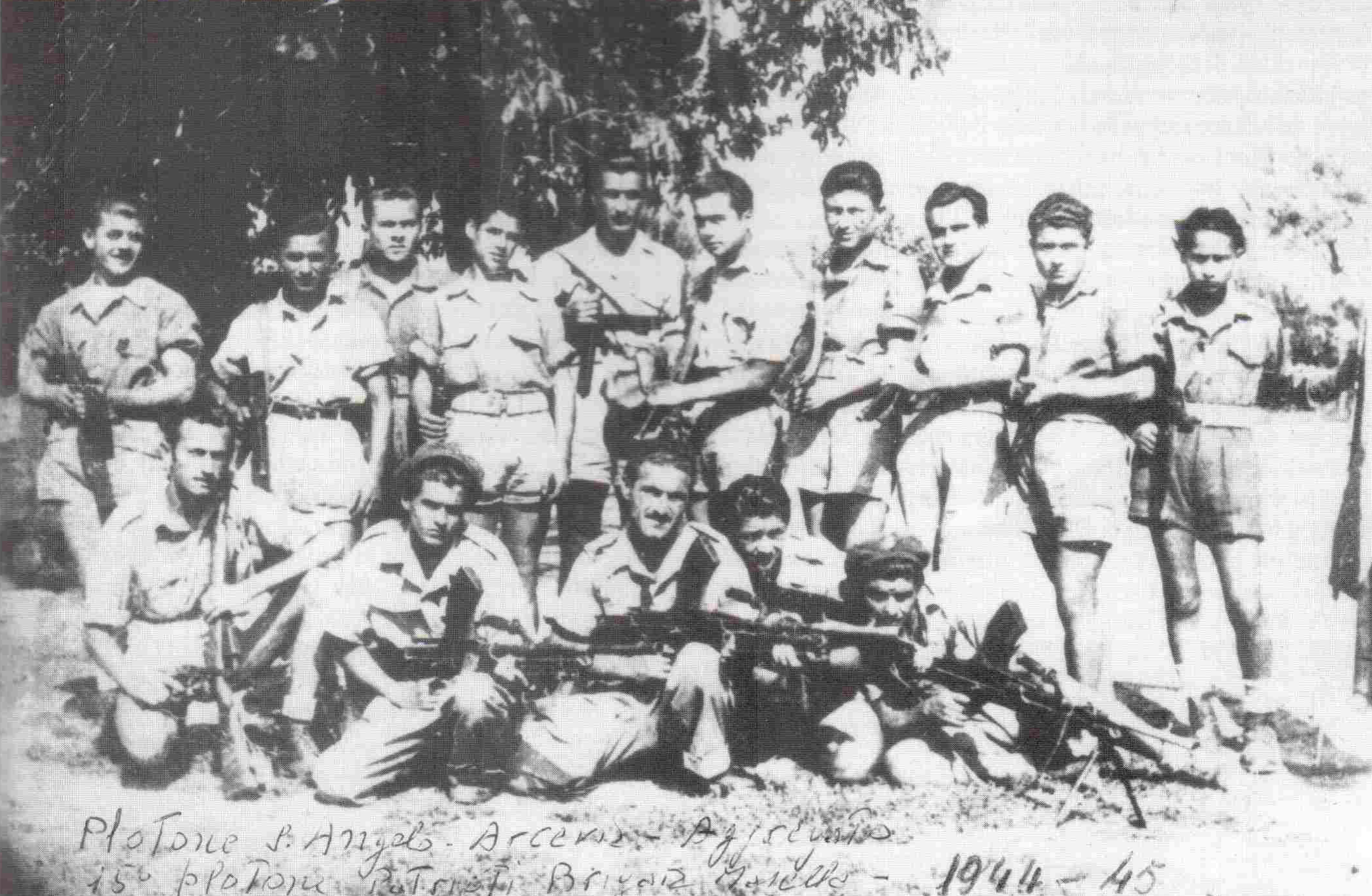
"S. Angelo Group" of Arcevia belonging to the Maiella Brigade

The Maiella's success in Arcevia was also helped by a local partisan group. On August 20, in Piticchio, 37 rebels from the Valle Misa group joined the Maiella, forming the XV "S. Angelo" platoon (in memory of the victims of the Nazi massacre of Monte Sant'Angelo. This marked the opening of the formation to non-Abruzzo volunteers. He was led by Luciano La Marca, a former ensign from Rome who had escaped the Arcevia massacre. He fell in Pesaro on August 31, during a firefight with the Germans.

In Montecarotto, internal tensions emerged among CIL officers, some of whom adopted coercive measures against the civilian population suspected of espionage, rounding up elderly and sick people under threat of arms and announcing executions for those without regular residence authorization.

On August 3, a German attack on Montecarotto surprised the Nembo, but it was repelled. During the same period, Oliver Leese threatened to bomb Ostra Vetere to accelerate the Allied advance and destroy German artillery. The Italo-Polish front exerted increasing pressure on the German 71st Division, and the Nembo moved towards Serra de' Conti and the Misa river, consolidating Allied control over the territory. A partisan reconnaissance operation allowed the identification of enemy positions and averted the bombing. Italian and Allied soldiers remained in garrison in the town until August 4.

The final phases of the fighting saw the withdrawal of German forces. On August 5, the last Wehrmacht units crossed the Cesano river, the natural border north of the province of Ancona. On August 19, 1944, Montecarotto was occupied by divisions of the British 8th Army and the CIL's Second Brigade, marching towards Pesaro for the breakthrough of the Gothic Line.

== Towards the Metauro: the "chemical bomb" ==
After Montecarotto, the Maiella advanced towards the Metauro, leaving the Nembo to clear the territory of mines and recover the weapons. The next objective was the protection of the Cabernardi and Percozzone sulfur mines, near Sassoferrato, from potential fires caused by the Germans. On August 12, the Maiella's 8th platoon occupied Percozzone and the sulfur mines of Bellisio, south of Pergola. Unable to stop the Maiella militarily, on August 13 Raapke ordered the burning of sulfur, releasing a toxic cloud. The patriots, alerted, took refuge on the heights north of Arcevia. The wind changed direction, forcing the Germans to retreat from Pergola to Montemaggiore al Metauro, suffering significant losses and leaving weapons to the Allies.

On August 24, the first clashes to break through the Gothic Line began, involving the British 8th Army, the Polish Second Corps, and the Maiella Brigade against German forces. Observing troop movements from Montemaggiore al Metauro, with their binoculars, were two exceptional witnesses: Winston Churchill and General Sir Harold Alexander, the Commander-in-Chief (C-in-C) of the Allied Armies in Italy.

== After the battle ==
During the liberation of Montecarotto and the surrounding territory, approximately 40 German soldiers were killed and 80 Polish, in addition to 253 wounded and 5 missing. Among military and civilians, there were 12 Italian casualties.

== See also ==
- 184th Nembo Parachute Division
- 71st Infantry Division (Wehrmacht)

== Bibliography ==
- Alberto Galeazzi, Resistenza e contadini nelle carte di un partigiano (1919-1949), Argalìa, Urbino 1980.
- Alberto Galeazzi, Montecarotto. I giorni della liberazione, Tipolito Artigiana, Ancona 1985.
- Angelo Verdini, Partigiani, minatori, soldati, contadini, in Giorgio Pedrocco (edited by), Un mondo cancellato. Miniere e minatori a Cabernardi, Editrice fortuna, Fano 1995, pp. 72–78.
- Sergio Sparapani (edited by), La guerra nelle Marche 1943-1944, il lavoro editoriale, Ancona 2005.
- Nicola Troilo, Storia della Brigata «Maiella» (1943-1945), Mursia, Milano 2011.
- Marco Patricelli, Patrioti. Storia della Brigata Maiella alleata degli Alleati, Ianieri, Pescara 2013.
- Nicola Mattoscio (edited by), Brigata Maiella, Resistenza e Bella ciao. Combattere cantando la libertà, Rubbettino, Catanzaro 2020.
- Ruggero Giacomini, Storia della Resistenza nelle Marche 1943-1944, affinità elettive, Ancona 2020.
- Marco Patricelli, Brigata Maiella. L'epopea dei volontari italiani nell'8ª Armata britannica, Rusconi libri, Santarcangelo (RN) 2021.
- Domenico Troilo, Gruppo patrioti della Maiella, decorato di Medaglia d’Oro al Valore Militare alla Bandiera, Fondazione Pescarabruzzo, Gestioni Culturali, Sambucheto 2022.
- Lucio Febo, Notti senza fine. La lotta epica della Brigata Maiella per la liberazione di Montecarotto dal nazifascismo, Studio Graffa, Ancona 2024.
