= Battle of San Pietro Infine =

WWII major engagement from 8–17 December 1943, in the Italian Campaign

Coordinates: 41°26′40″N 13°57′31″E

- Part of the Winter Line and the battle for Rome of the Italian campaign, World War II
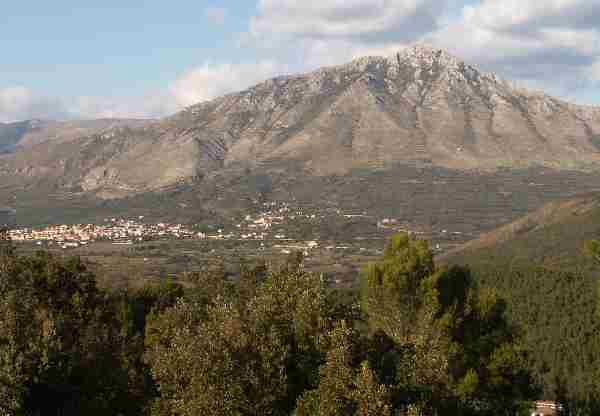
- The Liri valley with Mt. Sambúcaro overlooking the modern town of San Pietro Infine (left) and ruins of the original town (center).
| Date | 8–17 December 1943 |
| Location | San Pietro Infine, Italy |
| Result | Allied victory |

Belligerents
| United States (Kingdom of Italy) Italy | Germany |

Commanders and leaders
| Geoffrey Keyes; Fred L. Walker; Vincenzo Dapino | F. v. Senger u. Etterlin; Walter Fries; Wilhelm Raapke |

Units involved
| II Corps: 36th Infantry Div.; I Motorized Group. | XIV Panzer Corps: 29th Tank-Grenadier Div.; 71st Infantry Div. |

Casualties and losses
| 1,200 casualties (400 killed or missing, 800 wounded) | Unknown |

The Battle of San Pietro Infine (commonly referred to as the "Battle of San Pietro") was a major engagement from 8–17 December 1943, in the Italian Campaign of World War II involving Allied forces attacking from the south against heavily fortified positions of the German "Winter Line" in and around the town of San Pietro Infine, just south of Monte Cassino about halfway between Naples and Rome.

The eventual Allied victory in the battle was crucial in the ultimate drive to the north to liberate Rome. The battle is also remembered as the first in which the troops of the Royal Italian Army (Regio Esercito) fought as co-belligerents of the Allies following the armistice with Italy. The original town of San Pietro Infine was destroyed in the battle; the modern, rebuilt town of the same name is located a few hundred meters away.

== Background ==
=== North Africa and Sicily ===
The Allied invasion of Italy from the south followed the Allied successes in North Africa. Lieutenant General Bernard Montgomery's British Eighth Army advanced from the east following the Second Battle of El Alamein and the British-American invasion of French North Africa by Lieutenant General Kenneth Anderson's British First Army in Operation Torch had led to the surrender of almost 250,000 Axis forces in North Africa in May 1943.

The Germans retreated to the island of Sicily and on the night of 9/10 July 1943, an Allied armada of 2,590 vessels launched one of the largest combined operations of World War II: the Allied invasion of Sicily (Operation Husky). The invasion was launched by the American Seventh Army, under Lieutenant General George S. Patton Jr., and the British Eighth Army, under Lieutenant General Sir Bernard Montgomery. Both armies were under the command of the 15th Army Group, commanded by General Sir Harold Alexander. Over the next five weeks, 500,000 Allied soldiers, sailors, and airmen fought German and Italian forces for control of the island. Although the Allied powers were victorious, the Axis managed to evacuate over 100,000 men and 10,000 vehicles from Sicily across the Straits of Messina during the first seventeen days in August. The Allies then invaded the Italian mainland in early September 1943 at Salerno (Operation Avalanche), in Calabria (Operation Baytown) and Taranto (Operation Slapstick).

On 8 September, before the main invasion at Salerno by American Lieutenant General Mark W. Clark's Fifth Army (which contained significant British units), the surrender of Italy to the Allies was announced. Italian units ceased combat, and the Royal Italian Navy sailed to Allied ports to surrender. This changed the German defensive strategy greatly, and the Germans now regarded their former allies as enemies and moved to disarm Italian units and occupy important defensive positions. The invasion at Salerno was ultimately successful, although the Allies sustained heavy casualties, and subsequently captured nearby Naples on 1 October. German forces then withdrew to the north, towards Rome, and dug in along a series of well-fortified lines. By late 1943 the fighting had reached the Winter Line (also known as the Gustav Line).

=== Italy ===
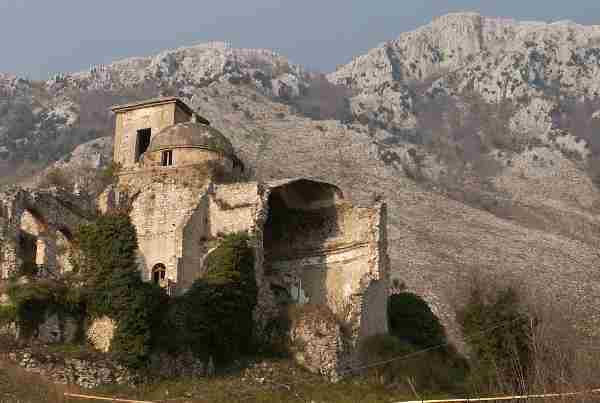
The bombed-out center of the town of San Pietro Infine.

The German Commander-in-Chief (C-in-C) Albert Kesselring—had marked out the Winter Line as three parallel defensive systems to the south of Rome. The defensives lines were called the Reinhard Line, Gustav Line and Hitler Line, placed 18 km (11 mi) one from the other, taking advantage of the point at which the Italian Peninsula is narrowest; they served as a formidable series of obstacles in the path of the Allied march toward Rome. The Reinhard was the southernmost of the three and was the German fall-back position from the Barbara Line and Volturno Line further to the south as German forces retreated gradually up the peninsula. (The Reinhard was also called the Bernhardt Line.) The Reinhard was actually a southern bulge in the stronger Gustav line to the north. On the eastern side, the Reinhard went from the Sangro River to the Adriatic Sea (along which length it was identical to the Gustav Line); then, in the west, it bulged south from Cassino to incorporate the mountains overlooking the approaches to the Liri Valley and then moved west to the mouth of the Garigliano River. The line passed directly through the town of San Pietro Infine, blocking the Mignano Gap, the pass through which Route 6, the main road up the center of Italy from Naples to Rome, ran toward Cassino and the entrance to the Liri valley.

== Preparations ==
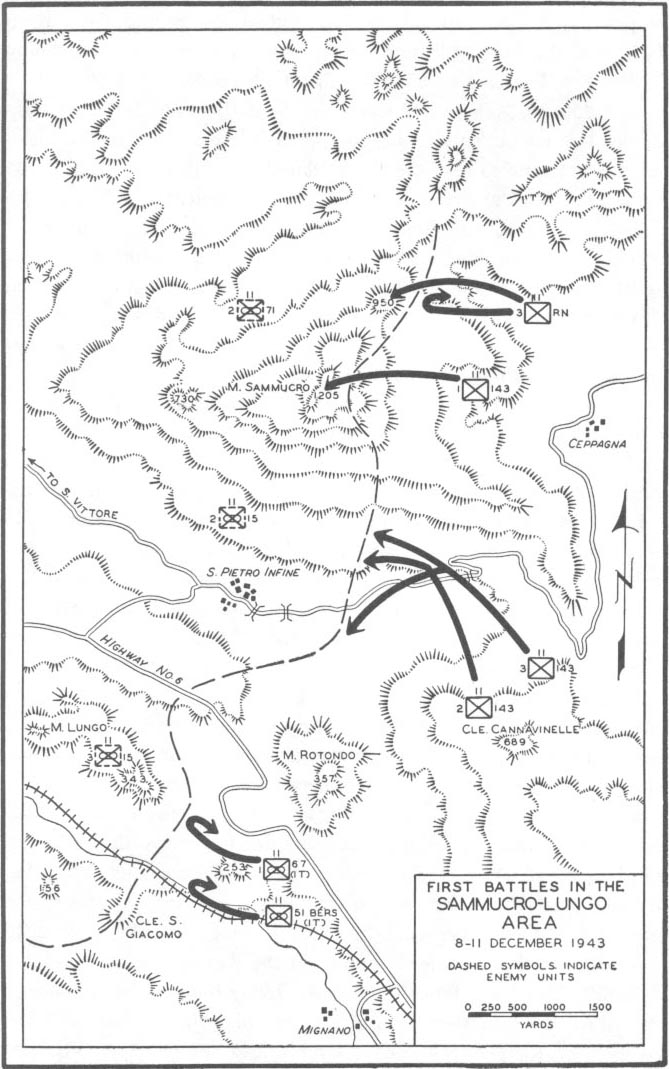
First Battles in the Sammucro (Note: Sambúcaro usually appears with the alternative name "Sammucro" on Allied military maps of the period.) – Monte Lungo Area 8–11 December 1943

The Germans occupied San Pietro in September 1943 to prepare the defenses. They evacuated all non-essential Italians from the town, meaning women, children and old men; they conscripted able-bodied men to help set up the defenses and requisitioned available vehicles and beasts of burden. They set up a defensive apparatus in the whole territory, in particular on Monte Sambúcaro and Monte Lungo, which overlooked the Mignano Gap. These were strategically important positions because they allowed the control of the long stretch of Route 6, important for the advance of the Allies. The Fifth Army began to attack the Reinhard/Bernhardt Line on 5 November, and the attacks continued into December.

The Battle of San Pietro was preceded by Allied attacks on the Camino hill mass at the entrance to the Mignano Gap (named for the small town on the road at that point). The entire hill mass is about 10 km (6.2 mi) long and 6 km (3.7 mi) wide. After that, the main Allied effort was against the German defenses on Monte Sambúcaro and Monte Lungo, which dominated the narrow valley on the northeast and southwest respectively. As a point of historical interest, the assault on Monte Lungo was aided for the first time by the 1st Italian Motorized Group, part of the recently reconstituted Italian army, now fighting on the side of the Allies.

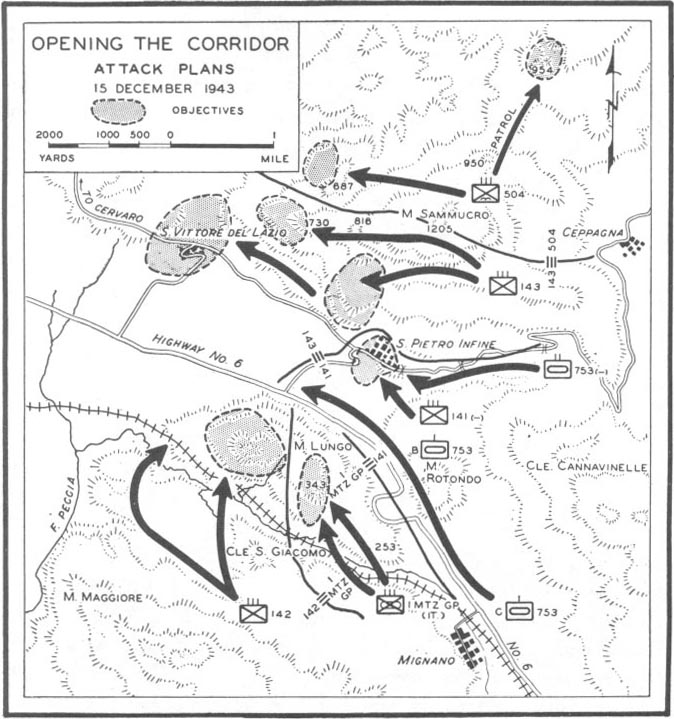
Final Allied assault on and through the first segment of the German Winter Line at San Pietro Infine 15 December 1943.

== The battle ==
The direct attack on the German positions in and around San Pietro began on 8 December by Major General Geoffrey Keyes' II Corps of the Fifth Army. The positions were defended by two battalion sized elements of the 15th Panzer Grenadier Regiment (29th Panzergrenadier Division) and a battalion of the 71st Infantry Division, all part of German Tenth Army's XIV Panzer Corps.

The Battle of San Pietro, documentary directed by John Huston for the U.S. Army, 1945.

After a week of intense attacks and counterattacks, the U.S. 36th Division's 143rd Infantry Regiment the 3rd Ranger Battalion and the 504th Parachute Regimental Combat Team (504th PRCT) commanded the heights of the Sambúcaro mass. The U.S. 36th Division then planned a further effort for 15 December. The 143rd Infantry, assisted by the 504th PRCT, would continue to push west along the shoulders of Sambúcaro and take San Vittore del Lazio while to the south of Route 6 the 142nd Infantry, supported by the Italian 1st Motorized Group, were to capture Monte Lungo. In the center, the 141st Infantry would attack San Pietro itself. The main attack of the 36th Division started at 12:00 on 15 December. In an effort to break the German defenses in the town, two platoons from the 753rd Tank Battalion attacked with 16 Sherman tanks and M10 tank destroyers. The armored attack failed due to mines and anti-tank fire. Four of the 16 tanks survived. After four successive Allied attacks and German counterattacks, II Corps held the dominating ground on both flanks, Monte Lungo and the Sambúcaro peaks, so the Germans pulled back from San Pietro. The Germans counterattacked on 16 December to cover their withdrawal as they retreated to positions farther north at Cedro Hill, Monte Porchia, San Vittore, and the western spurs of Sambúcaro.

== Aftermath ==
The Battle of San Pietro was part of the overall campaign to breach the Bernhardt/Reinhard Line, some 10 km (6.2 mi) deep at that point. It took six weeks of heavy fighting—from early November to late December—to overcome the German defenses. During that time, the Fifth Army sustained 16,000 casualties. The highway through the Mignano Gap to the Liri Valley was nicknamed "Death Valley" by members of the attacking force. The battle destroyed the town of San Pietro Infine completely. Destruction was wrought by a combination of close combat, both Allied and German mortar and artillery, and German "scorched earth" policy. Both the battle and the plight of the civilian population have inspired numerous accounts, most famous of which is the John Huston film The Battle of San Pietro.

After the battle American General Mark Wayne Clark, commander of the Fifth Army, sent Vincenzo Dapino a congratulatory telegram: "I wish to congratulate the officers and soldiers of your command for the success of yesterday's attack on Monte Lungo at Point 343. This action demonstrates the determination of the Italian soldiers to free their country from German domination, a determination that may well serve as an example to the oppressed peoples of Europe". On 11 January 1944 Dapino left the command of the 1st Motorized Group to General Umberto Utili and entered service at the Army General Staff for special assignments, having been awarded the title of Officer of the Military Order of Savoy.

By mid-January, Fifth Army had reached the formidable Gustav Line defenses and commenced the first Battle of Monte Cassino, which started on 17 January 1944.
