= Ad Flexum =

Ad Flexum may refer to:

- Mosonmagyaróvár, Hungary
- San Pietro in Fine, Italy
