= Sanctuary of the Madonna de' Piternis, Cervaro =

Catholic church in Frosinone province, Italy

Coordinates: 41°29′13.4″N 13°55′01.8″E

The Sanctuary of the Madonna de' Piternis is a Roman Catholic church just outside of the town of Cervaro, near the base of Monte Aquilone, province of Frosinone, region of Lazio, Italy.

== History ==
A chapel at the site was present before the year 1000, at a site were a shepherdess received a Marian apparition. A church was built in 1399, and consecrated in 1408, to shelter the aedicule with an image of the Madonna. The title of the Madonna is somewhat mysterious. The church has undergone a number of refurbishments, the last in 1692. The interior contains frescoes from the 15th and 16th centuries. The apse has a fresco of Christ Pantocrator surrounded by apostles and saints. By the entrance is a fresco of the Madonna del Latte, while the left wall has a 15th-century Madonna appearing to a peasant girl.
