= Viticuso =

- Comune
- Comune di Viticuso
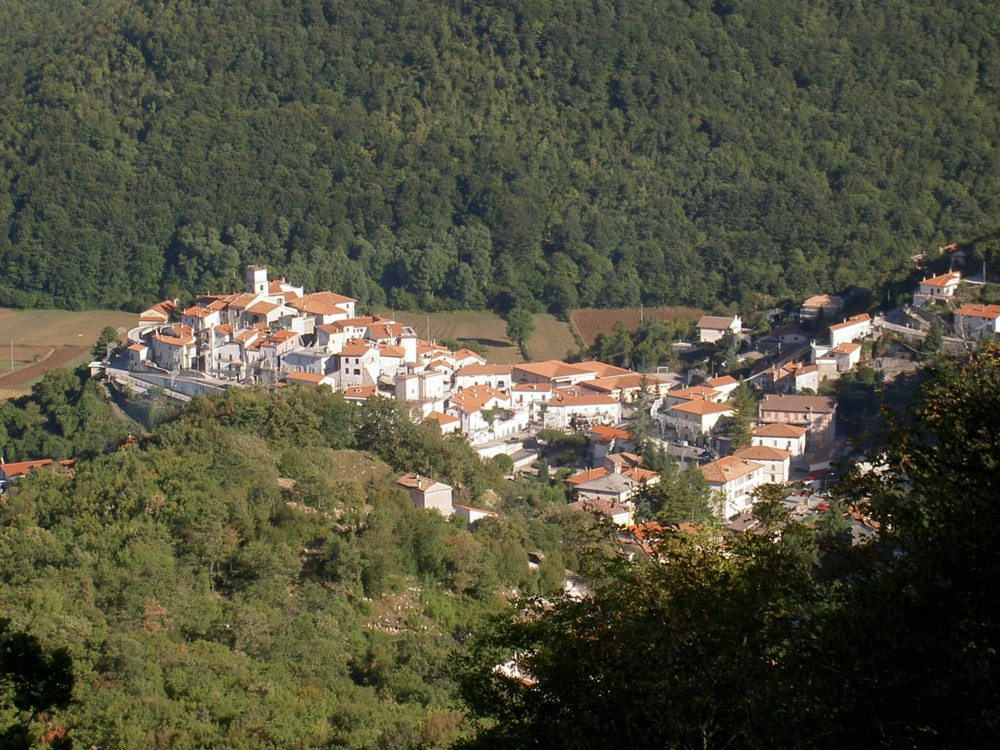
- View of Viticuso

- Location within Italy Location within Lazio
- Coordinates: 41°32′N 13°58′E
- Country: Italy
- Region: Lazio
- Province: Frosinone (FR)
  - Mayor: (Vincenzo Antonino Iannetta)

Area
  - Total: 21.1 km^{2} (8.1 sq mi)
- Elevation: 858 m (2,815 ft)

Population (28 February 2017)
  - Total: 331
  - Density: 15.7/km^{2} (40.6/sq mi)
- Demonym: Viticusani
- Time zone: UTC+1 (CET)
  - Summer (DST): UTC+2 (CEST)
- Postal code: 03040
- Dialing code: 0776
- ISTAT code: 060091
- Patron saint: Antonino
- Saint day: 2 September
- Website: Official website

Viticuso is a comune (municipality) in the Province of Frosinone in the Italian region Lazio, located about 130 kilometres (81 mi) southeast of Rome and about 111 kilometres (69 mi) northeast of Naples.

Viticuso borders the following municipalities: Acquafondata, Cervaro, Conca Casale, Pozzilli, San Vittore del Lazio, Vallerotonda.

The town is situated at approximately 860 meters above sea level and is surrounded by small peaks that rise to about 1260 meters above sea level within the municipal territory, forming a sort of antechamber to the Mainarde massif. Due to its altitude, the area is to be considered exclusively mountainous.

During the Samnite Wars, the area was inhabited by the Pentri, and the entire region played a significant role in the conflicts between the Romans and the Samnites. In the Middle Ages, it was an important crossroads along the routes that connected Molise to the Abbey of Montecassino. This is evident in the local place names and the medieval remains of the historic center, which have a distinct Norman character. The main gate of the castle, facing Molise, and the corresponding "access" towards Cassino can still be identified. The castle was built by the Counts of Venafro in the 11th century within the Terra di San Benedetto. The nearby San Germano served as the political and administrative center of the territory. Viticuso was part of the Kingdom of Sicily, the Kingdom of Naples, and subsequently the Kingdom of the Two Sicilies until the unification of the Kingdom of Italy in 1861. In 1927, along with the other municipalities in the area, it became part of the new province of Frosinone.

During World War II, the village was occupied by German soldiers who controlled the Gustav Line on the Cassino front.

Viticuso owes its existence to its strategic location at the border between important lands and connections, between the Valle Latina and the Valle del Volturno, on which it overlooks. It is situated on the northwestern fringes of the Sannite population's influence area, not far from the Sannite centers of Atina and Aquilonia. This geographical position has shaped its pastoral tradition, which is closely tied to the paths of transhumance initially traced by livestock in search of rich pastures. These routes were later utilized by the local populations as connecting routes and eventually regulated by usage rights during the medieval and modern ages.

The toponym referring to a small-sized settlement administered by a free man first appears in its modern sense in a document in which Gisulf, the Lombard Duke of Benevento, grants the lands of Acquafondata and Viticuso to the Abbey of Montecassino.

During those centuries, Viticuso served as the frontier between the possessions of Montecassino, the Abbey of San Vincenzo al Volturno, and the emerging County of Venafro. These were centers of political conflicts that marked the history of the second half of the first millennium. Situated just south of the route connecting the Valle del Volturno to the prosperous Roman city of Atina, Viticuso occupies an equally significant path that comfortably linked the Campanian and Molisan settlements with the Valle Latina, the Cassino Abbey, and the strategically important coastal harbors along the Tyrrhenian Sea and the Garigliano River.

It was probably through its lands that the Saracens made their first unsuccessful assault on the Cassino Abbey in 866, which was later destroyed in 883. Two years prior, San Vincenzo al Volturno had also been destroyed. The saddle that separates the lake site of Viticuso from the Lazio side of Aquilon allows for a view all the way to the sea through the Suio gorge, which was the route taken by Saracen incursions that culminated in the Battle of Garigliano, likely fought at the foot of the settlement of Sant'Apollinare and marked the end of the Arab attempt to conquer the peninsula.

Depending on the varying power held by the two abbacies, Montecassino and San Vincenzo al Volturno, Viticuso was alternately assigned to one or the other of the contenders. However, in the mid-10th century, Viticuso began to take on the characteristics of a castrum. A fortified nucleus is mentioned in 1018 when the Counts of Venafro, perhaps for the last time, took the lands of Viticuso from Montecassino within their jurisdiction. They then strengthened the settlement and erected the Acquafondata castle. Only the intervention of knights sent by the abbot repelled the Venafrans back to their domains. This notation suggests that by 1018, the inhabited core of Viticuso was sufficiently consolidated, to the extent that fortifying it as an outpost of the county was deemed necessary, unlike Acquafondata, where the castle was only built on that occasion.

The Cassino Abbey proudly asserts its possession of Viticuso when Abbot Desiderius, who held the title of Pope Victor III, consolidates the role of the Abbey in the context of its relations with the Norman principality of Capua. The name of the Castrum, along with the Abbey's other holdings, is engraved on the bronze doors that were cast in Constantinople for the abbey church.

From that moment onwards, Viticuso loses its role as a frontier castle and shares the common fate of the inland areas, where pastoral tradition marks the rhythm of time, interrupted by catastrophic events such as earthquakes. Particularly significant were the earthquakes in the mid-14th century that destroyed the Montecassino Abbey, and another one a century later that caused severe damage throughout the territory, likely impacting parts of the actual Castle itself.

The society primarily based on pastoral resources struggles under the burden of tithes owed to the abbey, and for centuries, the sources do not provide significant elements that shed light on the development of the village. Nevertheless, the convenient accessibility to major urban centers facilitated the presence of prominent figures in terms of culture, who maintained regular relationships with the clergy of nearby dioceses. This is evidenced by interesting inscriptions that are still preserved within the main church.

During the years that witnessed the birth of the Kingdom of Italy, the presence of wooded areas and a dense network of trails facilitated the phenomenon of brigandage, which found a perfect environment in Viticuso to unfold some highly intense episodes.

Subsequently, the progressive impoverishment of the inland areas is only partially mitigated by the construction of sections of intermunicipal roadways undertaken by the new kingdom in the early twentieth century.

During the course of the Second World War, once again, Viticuso's location along the path of the defensive line known as the Gustav Line resulted in partial destruction, causing significant damage to its architectural and historical artistic heritage.

The gradual loss of profitability in pastoralism, as the predominant activity, has led to a slow but steady abandonment of the village, which today stands out for the richness of its landscapes and its history, making it particularly suited for leisure activities.

In addition to the culture and agro-pastoral traditions (from the Pentri to brigandage, passing through the Lombards of the medieval era), Viticuso is connected to the world of Pop Art and in particular to Sir Eduardo Paolozzi, whose parents were from Viticuso and ran an ice cream shop in the near Edinburgh. Eduardo returned and spent every summer in his home town.

== Nature ==
The flora of Viticuso is exceptionally rich in diversity, boasting nearly 2000 species of higher plants, excluding mosses, lichens, and fungi. The beech forest can be considered the jewel of the country's woods, but in meadows and grassy areas, one can find numerous species of wild orchids, ranging from the common Anacamptis morio to the rare Lady's Slipper Orchid. Aromatic and medicinal plants are quite common, such as oregano, wild fennel, dandelion, thyme, valerian, and many others.

The fauna of Viticuso features species of particular rarity and a wide variety of animals: 21 species of mammals identified, 65 of birds, 21 of reptiles and amphibians, and thousands of insect species.

A notable mammal among the inhabitants is the southern squirrel, which was discovered in 2017 as a new species. Thanks to an in-depth genetic, morphological, and ecological study, a team of Italian researchers, coordinated by the University of Insubria, found that the squirrel populations in southern Italy belong to a distinct species rather than a subspecies, as previously believed. The southern squirrel (scientific name Sciurus meridionalis), present in southern Italy, is a "close relative" of the common European squirrel (Sciurus vulgaris) found throughout the rest of Italy except for Sicily and Sardinia. This new species has a distinctive black coloration with a white belly, unlike the common European squirrel, which can vary from red-orange to dark brown.

Mammals in Viticuso: Roe deer (Capreolus capreolus), Deer (Cervus elaphus), Wild boar (Sus scrofa), Weasel (Mustela nivalis), Stone marten (Martes foina), Wildcat (Felis silvestris), Dormouse (Glis glis), Porcupine (Hystrix cristata), Hare (Lepus europaeus), Wolf (Canis lupus italicus), Marten (Martes martes), Dormouse (Eledone moschata), Common noctule (Nyctalus noctula), Dwarf bat (Pipistrellus pipistrellus), Hedgehog (Erinaceus europaeus), Squirrel (Sciurus meridionalis), Talpa (Talpa europaea), Badger (Meles meles), Shrew (Sorex araneus), House mouse (Mus musculus), Fox (Vulpes vulpes)
