= 235th Volunteer Training Regiment "Piceno" =

Active Italian Army training unit

- 235° Reggimento Addestramento Volontari "Piceno"
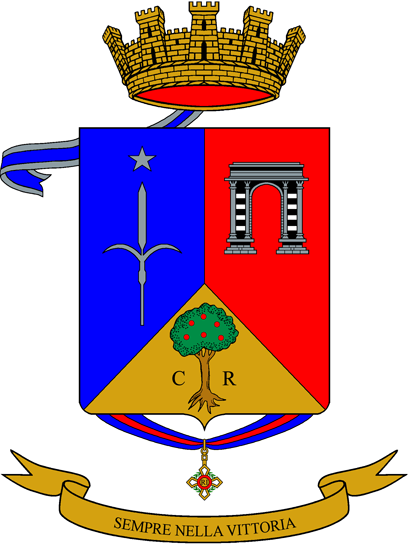
- Regimental coat of arms
- Active: 6 Feb. 1917 – 30 Dec. 1918; 20 Sept. 1941 – 1 Dec. 1941; 1 Jan. 1942 – 31 Jan. 1946; 1 Jan. 1976 – today
- Country: Italy
- Branch: Italian Army
- Part of: Infantry School
- Garrison/HQ: Ascoli Piceno
- Motto: "Sempre nella vittoria"
- Anniversaries: 19 August 1917 – Battle of Selo
- Decorations: 1× Military Order of Italy; 1× Silver Medal of Military Valor; 1× Silver Cross of Army Merit

Insignia
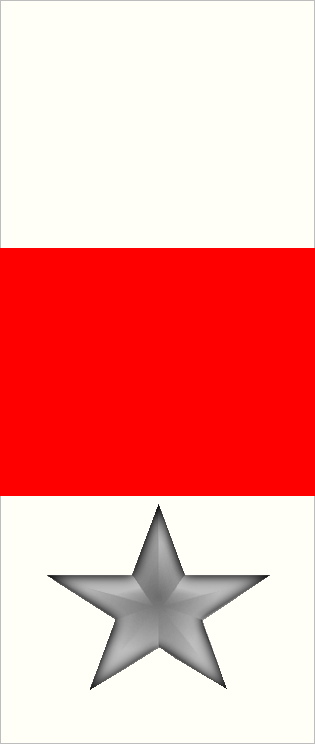
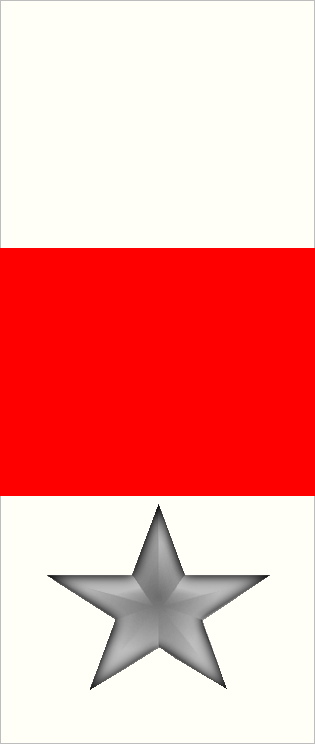
- Regimental gorget patches

The 235th Volunteer Training Regiment "Piceno" (Italian: 235° Reggimento Addestramento Volontari "Piceno") is an active unit of the Italian Army based in Ascoli Piceno in the Marche region. The regiment is named for the city of historic region of Piceno and was part of the Italian Army's infantry arm, until it became a training unit and was redesignated as a "multi-arms unit" in 2004.

The regiment was formed during World War I and fought on the Italian front. After the war the regiment was disbanded. The regiment was reformed for a short time in 1941 and then again in 1942 for service in World War II. In February 1942 the regiment was assigned to the 152nd Infantry Division "Piceno", which was in the Salento peninsula when the Armistice of Cassibile was announced on 8 September 1943. The division immediately clashed with invading German forces to protect the landing of the British 1st Airborne Division at Taranto on 9 September. The division then joined the Italian Co-belligerent Army and was reorganized as Combat Group "Piceno", which was intended to fight alongside the British Eighth Army in the Italian campaign. Due to the war's course the combat group was transferred in 1945 to Rome and reorganized as training units. Group and regiments were disbanded in 1946. In 1976 the regiment was reformed as a battalion sized training unit. In 1994 the regiment was reformed and has been active as training unit ever since.

== History ==
=== World War I ===
The 235th Infantry Regiment (Brigade "Piceno") was mustered, together with its sister regiment the 236th Infantry Regiment (Brigade "Piceno"), on 6 February 1917 between Grisignano and Torri di Quartesolo near Vicenza. The two regiments formed the Brigade "Piceno" and had been raised with reservists from the Abruzzo and Marche regions by the regimental depots of the following pre-war regiments:

- 17th Infantry Regiment (Brigade "Acqui") in Ascoli Piceno: Brigade "Piceno" Command and 235th Infantry Regiment
- 13th Infantry Regiment (Brigade "Pinerolo") in L'Aquila: 236th Infantry Regiment

Each of the two regiments consisted of three battalions, which each fielded four fusilier companies and one machine gun section. The brigade soon entered the Italian Front. In August 1917 the brigade fought in the Eleventh Battle of the Isonzo in the area of Opatje Selo and Korita na Krasu. For their conduct during this battle the brigade's two regiments were awarded a Silver Medal of Military Valor. In October 1918 the brigade fought in the Battle of Vittorio Veneto in the Pasubio massif, and after the Italian breakthrough of the Austro-Hungarian lines the brigade advanced into Trentino, where it reached Rovereto by 4 November 1918.

After the war the brigade and its two regiments were disbanded 30 December 1918.

=== World War II ===
After the outbreak of World War II the two regiments were reformed by the infantry regiments of the 24th Infantry Division "Pinerolo" and 49th Infantry Division "Parma": the 235th Infantry Regiment "Piceno" was reformed for the first time in Ascoli Piceno on 20 September 1941 by the 49th Infantry Regiment "Parma", while the 236th Infantry Regiment "Piceno" was reformed in Macerata on 20 September 1941 by the 50th Infantry Regiment "Parma". On 1 December 1941 the 235th Infantry Regiment "Piceno" was renamed 383rd Infantry Regiment "Venezia" and assigned to the 19th Infantry Division "Venezia". The 235th was reformed again on 1 January 1942 in Chieti by the 14th Infantry Regiment "Pinerolo". The two regiments consisted of a command, a command company, three fusilier battalions, a mortar company equipped with 81mm Mod. 35 mortars, and in case of the 235th Piceno a cannons company equipped with 47/32 anti-tank guns, while the 236th Piceno fielded a support weapons battery, which was equipped with 65/17 infantry support guns.

On 20 February 1942 the two regiments were assigned to the 152nd Infantry Division "Piceno". In June 1942 the division was transferred to Apulia and tasked with the coastal defence of the Salento peninsula. The division remained in the Salento area until the announcement of the Armistice of Cassibile on 8 September 1943. Together with the 58th Infantry Division "Legnano", the 210th Coastal Division, and the XXXI Coastal Brigade the Piceno redeployed immediately to form a defensive line from Taranto through Grottaglie, Francavilla Fontana, and Latiano to Brindisi, to screen the landing of the British 1st Airborne Division at Taranto on 9 September from attacks of the German 1st Fallschirmjäger Division.

After the Germans had retreated from Southern Italy the division became part of the Italian Co-belligerent Army and on 10 October 1944 was reorganized as Combat Group "Piceno", which was equipped with British Army materiel. Each of the combat group's infantry regiments consisted of a command, a command company, three fusilier battalions, a mortar company armed with British ML 3 inch mortars, and an anti-tank company armed with British QF 6-pounder anti-tank guns.

On 8 January 1945 the Combat Group "Piceno" moved to Cesano near Rome, where on 25 January 1945 the Combat Group was renamed: Replacements Training Center for the Italian Forces in Combat (Italian: Centro Addestramento Complementi per le Forze Italiane in Combattimento). On 31 January 1945 the 235th Infantry Regiment was renamed 1st Replacements Collection and Sorting Regiment (Italian: 1° Reggimento Raccolta e Smistamento Complementi) and on 10 May 1945 the regiment was renamed 1st Replacements Training Regiment. On 31 January 1946 the Replacements Training Center reorganized as the Italian Army's Infantry School in Cesano and Artillery School in Bracciano and the regimental commands were disbanded.

=== Cold War ===
During the 1975 army reform the army disbanded the regimental level and newly independent battalions were granted for the first time their own flags. On 1 January 1976 the Infantry Complement Officer Cadets School in Ascoli Piceno was renamed 235th Infantry Battalion "Piceno". The battalion received the flag and traditions of the 235th Infantry Regiment "Piceno" and assigned to the army's Anti-aircraft Artillery Command as the command's recruits training battalion. The battalion consisted of a command, a command platoon, three recruits companies, and a detachment with two recruits companies in Chieti. On 1 February 1985 the detachment in Chieti became an autonomous unit and was renamed 123rd Infantry Battalion "Chieti". In 1987 the command platoon was increased to command and services company.

=== Recent times ===
On 9 February 1994 the 235th Infantry Battalion "Piceno" lost its autonomy and the next day the battalion entered the reformed 235th Regiment "Piceno". On 8 October 2004 the regiment joined the newly formed Training Units Grouping and was renamed 235th Volunteer Training Regiment "Piceno".

== Organization ==
As of 2024 the 235th Volunteer Training Regiment "Piceno" is organized as follows:

- 235th Volunteer Training Regiment "Piceno", in Ascoli Piceno
  - Command and Logistic Support Company
  - 1st Training Battalion
    - 1st Company
    - 2nd Company
    - 3rd Company
