= 152nd Infantry Division "Piceno" =

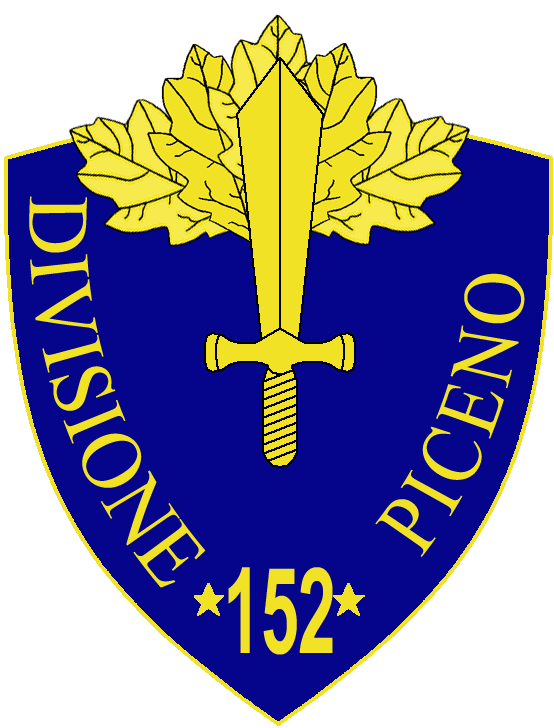
- 152nd Infantry Division "Piceno" insignia
- Active: 20 February 1942– 10 October 1944
- Country: Kingdom of Italy
- Branch: Royal Italian Army
- Type: Infantry
- Size: Division
- Engagements: World War II

Insignia
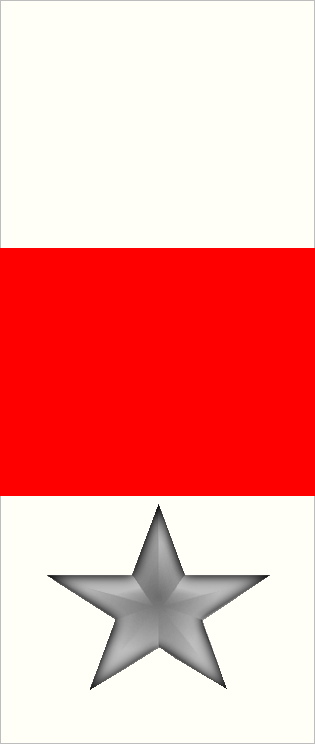
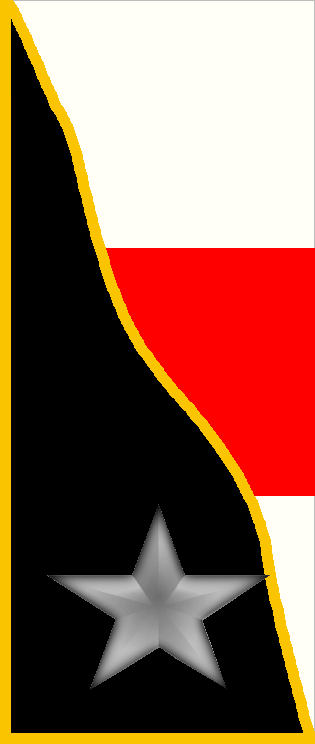
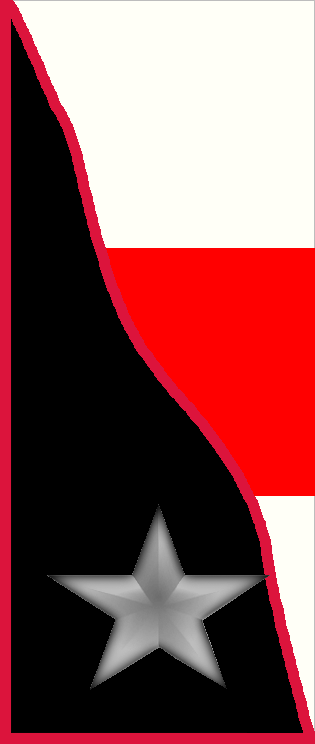
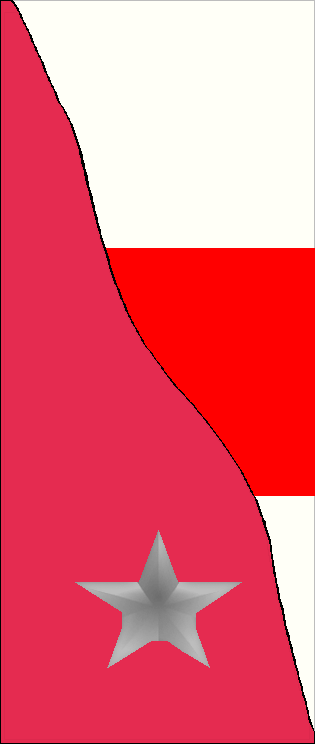
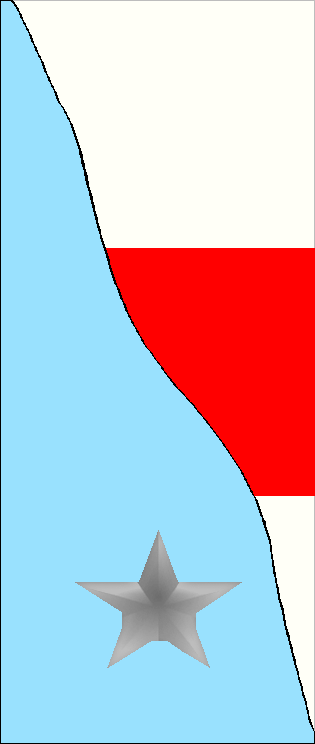
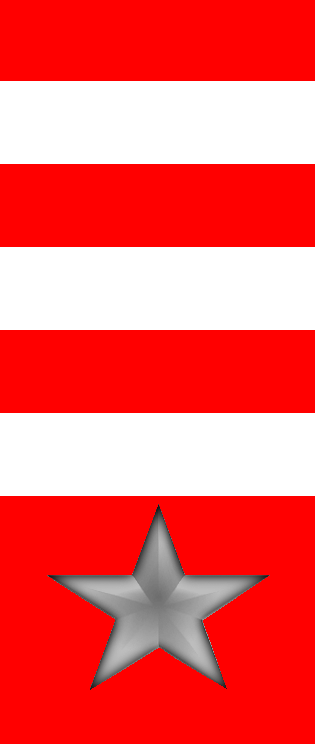
- Identification symbol: Piceno Division gorget patches

The 152nd Infantry Division "Piceno" (Italian: 152ª Divisione di fanteria "Piceno") was an infantry division of the Royal Italian Army during World War II. The Piceno was formed on 20 February 1942 and named for the region of Piceno. The Piceno was classified as an occupation infantry division, which meant that the division's artillery regiment consisted of two artillery groups instead of the three artillery groups of line infantry divisions and that the divisional mortar battalion was replaced by a divisional machine gun battalion.

The division was stationed in southern Italy and after the announcement of the Armistice of Cassibile resisted advancing German forces. The division then joined the Italian Co-belligerent Army and was trained to fight on the allied side during the Italian Campaign.

== History ==
=== World War I ===
The division's lineage begins with the Brigade "Piceno" raised on 6 February 1917 with the 235th and 236th infantry regiments. The brigade fought on the Italian front in World War I and together with its regiments was disbanded after the war on 30 December 1918.

=== World War II ===
The 152nd Infantry Division "Piceno" was activated in Chieti on 20 February 1942 and consisted of the 235th Infantry Regiment "Piceno", 236th Infantry Regiment "Piceno", and the 152nd Artillery Regiment "Piceno", which was raised after the division had been activated. As a division raised during the war the Piceno did not have its own regimental depots and therefore its regiments were raised by the depots of the 24th Infantry Division "Pinerolo" and 49th Infantry Division "Parma": the 235th Infantry Regiment "Piceno" was raised for the first time in Ascoli Piceno on 20 September 1941 by the 49th Infantry Regiment "Parma", while the 236th Infantry Regiment "Piceno" was raised in Macerata on 20 September 1941 by the 50th Infantry Regiment "Parma". The 235th Infantry Regiment was renamed on 1 December 1941 383rd Infantry Regiment "Venezia" and assigned to the 19th Infantry Division "Venezia". The 235th was raised again on 1 January 1942 in Chieti by the 14th Infantry Regiment "Pinerolo".

In early March 1942 the 236th Infantry Regiment left the division and was sent to Sardinia, where it was tasked with guarding the air base at Milis. As replacement the depot of the 14th Infantry Regiment "Pinerolo" raised the 336th Infantry Regiment "Piceno" on 26 April 1942. The 336th Infantry Regiment joined the 235th Infantry Regiment and 152nd Artillery Regiment "Piceno" in the division. The 152nd Artillery Regiment had been raised on 15 April 1942 by the depot of the 49th Artillery Regiment "Parma" in Teramo.

In June 1942 the division was transferred to Apulia and tasked with the coastal defence of the Salento peninsula. The division's units were garrisoned in Brindisi, Otranto, Santa Maria di Leuca, Gallipoli, and Leporano. On 28 July 1942 the three battalions of the 336th Infantry Regiment were reorganized as motorized units and in September the battalions were shipped to Libya to bring the depleted 16th Motorized Division "Pistoia" back up to strength:

- I Battalion/ 336th Infantry Regiment "Piceno" became the III Battalion/ 35th Infantry Regiment "Pistoia"
- II Battalion/ 336th Infantry Regiment "Piceno" became the I Battalion/ 36th Infantry Regiment "Pistoia"
- III Battalion/ 336th Infantry Regiment "Piceno" became the III Battalion/ 36th Infantry Regiment "Pistoia"

The battalions of the 336th Infantry Regiment were reformed in Chieti and by the December 1942 the regiment was back at full strength.

The division remained in the Salento area until the announcement of the Armistice of Cassibile on 8 September 1943. Together with the 58th Infantry Division "Legnano", the 210th Coastal Division, and the XXXI Coastal Brigade the Piceno redeployed immediately to form a defensive line from Taranto through Grottaglie, Francavilla Fontana, and Latiano to Brindisi, to screen the landing of the British 1st Airborne Division at Taranto on 9 September from attacks of the German 1st Fallschirmjäger Division.

=== Combat Group "Piceno" ===
After the Germans had retreated from Southern Italy the Piceno entered the Italian Co-belligerent Army and on 10 October 1944 was reorganized as Combat Group "Piceno", which was equipped with British Army materiel. On 8 January 1945 the Piceno moved to Cesano near Rome, where on 25 January 1945 the Combat Group was renamed: Replacements Training Center for the Italian Forces in Combat (Italian: Centro Addestramento Complementi per le Forze Italiane in Combattimento). On 31 January 1945 the 235th and 336th infantry regiments were renamed 1st Replacements Training Regiment and 2nd Replacements Training Regiment, while the 152nd Artillery Regiment was renamed Artillery Replacements Regiment and moved to Bracciano. On 31 January 1946 all three regiments were dissolved and their personnel used to create the Italian Army's Infantry School in Cesano and Artillery School in Bracciano.

== Organization ==
=== 152nd Infantry Division "Piceno" ===
152nd Infantry Division "Piceno" organization

- 152nd Infantry Division "Piceno"
  - Headquarters
    - Command Company
    - 154th Carabinieri Section
    - 155th Carabinieri Section
    - 92nd Field Post Office
    - 152nd Infantry Division Command Transport Squad
  - 235th Infantry Regiment "Piceno"
    - Command Company
    - 3 × Fusilier battalions
    - Cannons Company (47/32 mod. 35 anti-tank guns)
    - Mortar Company (81mm Mod. 35 mortars)
  - 236th Infantry Regiment "Piceno" (left the division in March 1942 and was sent to Sardinia)
    - Command Company
    - 3 × Fusilier battalions
    - Support Weapons Battery (65/17 mod. 13 infantry support guns)
    - Mortar Company (81mm Mod. 35 mortars)
  - 336th Infantry Regiment "Piceno" (joined the division in April 1942)
    - Command Company
    - 3 × Fusilier battalions
    - Cannons Company (47/32 mod. 35 anti-tank guns)
    - Mortar Company (81mm Mod. 35 mortars)
  - 152nd Artillery Regiment "Piceno"
    - Command Unit
    - I Group (100/22 mod. 14/19 howitzers; formed by the depot of the 53rd Artillery Regiment "Arezzo")
    - II Group (100/22 mod. 14/19 howitzers)
    - III Group (75/27 mod. 06 field guns; transferred on 10 March 1943 from the 156th Artillery Regiment "Vicenza")
    - IV Group (75/27 mod. 06 field guns; transferred on 10 March 1943 from the 156th Artillery Regiment "Vicenza")
    - V Group (75/13 mod. 15 mountain guns; transferred on 10 April 1943 from the 47th Artillery Regiment "Bari")
    - 1 × Anti-aircraft battery (20/65 Mod. 35 anti-aircraft guns)
    - Ammunition and Supply Unit
  - CLII Machine Gun Battalion
  - CLII Mixed Engineer Battalion
    - 152nd Engineer Company
    - 252nd Telegraph and Radio Operators Company
  - 152nd Anti-tank Company (47/32 mod. 35 anti-tank guns)
  - 152nd Medical Section
    - 2 × Field hospitals
    - 1 × Surgical unit
  - 152nd Supply Section
  - 1117th Transport Section

Attached to the division in 1943:

- CCIX Machine Gun Battalion
- IX Training Battalion

=== Combat Group "Piceno" ===
Combat Group "Piceno" organization

- Combat Group "Piceno"
  - Command Company
  - 235th Infantry Regiment "Piceno"
    - Command Company
    - 3 × Fusilier battalions
    - Anti-tank Company (QF 6-pounder anti-tank guns)
    - Mortar Company (ML 3-inch mortars)
  - 336th Infantry Regiment "Piceno"
    - Command Company
    - 3 × Fusilier battalions
    - Anti-tank Company (QF 6-pounder anti-tank guns)
    - Mortar Company (ML 3-inch mortars)
  - 152nd Artillery Regiment "Piceno"
    - Command Unit
    - I Group (QF 25-pounder field guns)
    - II Group (QF 25-pounder field guns)
    - III Group (QF 25-pounder field guns)
    - IV Group (QF 25-pounder field guns)
    - V Anti-tank Group (QF 17-pounder anti-tank guns)
    - VI Anti-aircraft Group (QF 40mm anti-aircraft guns)
  - CLII Mixed Engineer Battalion
    - 2 × Engineer companies
    - 1 × Teleradio company
  - Transport and Supply Company
  - Mobile Artillery and Engineer Materiel Depot
  - Medical Section
    - 2 × Field hospitals
    - 1 × Surgical unit
  - Maintenance Workshop
  - 2 × Carabinieri sections

== Commanding officers ==
The division's commanding officers were:

- Generale di Brigata Carlo Viale (20 February 1942 - 19 August 1942)
- Generale di Brigata Emilio Coronati (20 August 1942 - 6 December 1943)
- Generale di Brigata Emanuele Beraudo di Pralormo (7 December 1943 - May 1945)
