= Umberto Utili =

Italian general

- Born: 18 July 1895; Rome
- Died: 27 October 1952 (aged 57); Milan
- Burial place: Mignano Monte Lungo War Cemetery, Italy
- Military career
- Allegiance: Kingdom of Italy, Italy
- Branch: Royal Italian Army-Italian Co-Belligerent Army
- Service years: World War I–1952
- Rank: Generale di Corpo d'Armata (Lieutenant General)
- Conflicts: First World War, Second World War (Greco-Italian War, Eastern Front); Battle of Mignano Monte Lungo (Italian Campaign)
- Awards: Knight of the Military Order of Italy; Officer of the Military Order of Italy.

Umberto Utili (1895–1952) was an Italian general known for his service with the Italian Co-belligerent Army in 1943–1945.

== Biography ==
Utili took part in the Greco-Italian War and in the Russian Campaign. At the time of the Armistice of Cassibile on 8 September 1943 he was in Apulia, where on 9 September 1943 the 1st British Airborne Division landed. In January 1944 he was appointed command of the I Motorized Grouping the first large formation of the Italian Co-Belligerent Army, which was assigned to the British 8th Army. In March 1944 the grouping was expanded to the Italian Liberation Corps.

After the successful participation in the Battle of Ancona in July 1944 the Italian government proposed an expansion of the Italian forces. The Allies accepted and on 24 September 1944 the Italian Liberation Corps was used to form the first division-sized combat groups. After the war Utili commanded the III Territorial Defence Command in Milan.

He died in 1952 and was buried in the Mignano Monte Lungo Military Cemetery, where 975 Italian soldiers, who were killed fighting on the Allied side lie.

== Commands ==
Commands held by Utili:

- Commander Central School of Artillery
- Chief of Staff Italian Expeditionary Corps in Russia, Soviet Union 1941-42
- Chief of Staff XXV Army Corps, Soviet Union 1942-43
- Commander I Motorized Grouping, Italy 1943-44
- Commander Italian Liberation Corps, Italy 1944
- Commander Combat Group "Legnano", Italy 1944-45
- Commander 58th Infantry Division "Legnano", Italy 1945-?
- Commander III Territorial Defence Command, Italy 1950-52

== Honors and awards ==
Knight of the Military Order of Italy

4 August 1942.

Officer of the Military Order of Italy

26 October 1945.

Legion of Merit rank commander

=== Acknowledgements ===
Bergamo dedicated a plaque to him in the Rocca (city castle).

== Bibliography ==
- Utili, Umberto; Gabrio Lombardi (1995). Ragazzi, in piedi! La ripresa dell'esercito italiano dopo l'8 settembre. Mursia. ISBN 978-88-425-1896-9.

== See also ==
- Battle of San Pietro Infine
- Italian Co-Belligerent Navy
- Italian Co-Belligerent Air Force
- Vincenzo Dapino
- Military history of Italy during World War II
