= Domenico Troilo =

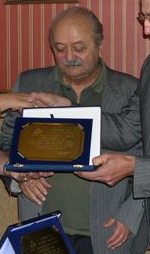
- Born: 10 April 1922; Gessopalena, Italy
- Died: 11 March 2007 (aged 84); Lanciano, Italy
- Education: University of Urbino
- Military career
- Allegiance: Italy
- Service years: 1940-1945
- Unit: Maiella Brigade
- Conflicts: North African campaign Italian campaign World War II
- Awards: Order of Merit of the Italian Republic; Silver Medal of Military Valor; War Merit Cross

Domenico Troilo (10 April 1922 – 11 March 2007) was an Italian soldier and the deputy commander of the Maiella Patriots Corps (Corpo dei Patrioti della Maiella). The 2nd Polish Army Corps awarded Troilo the Silver Medal of Military Valor and the Cross of Valor with Swords.

== Biography ==
Troilo was a second lieutenant in the Regia Aeronautica during his military service. In World War II he spent two years in Tunisia, then was transferred to service in Venaria Reale where he was at the time of the declaration of the armistice with the Allies. With the army in disarray and left without orders by the Government and the King who fled from Ortona (CH), he returned in an adventurous way to his homeland. On December 4, 1943 he lost his mother, killed by a burst of machine-gun fire, by units of the Wehrmacht who were also responsible for the massacre of Sant'Agata in Gessopalena. To avoid being rounded up, he was forced into hiding, where he began his resistance activity in a small band. In early 1944, he joined the Maiella Brigade, founded on December 5, 1943, by the lawyer Ettore Troilo, former secretary of Giacomo Matteotti and of socialist convictions, with whom he had no family ties. In the Maiella Brigade (Note: For information on the field commander of the Maiella Brigade and the patriotic activities of its volunteers, see: Domenico Troilo, Gruppo patrioti della Maiella, decorato di Medaglia d’Oro al Valore Militare alla Bandiera, Fondazione Pescarabruzzo, Gestioni Culturali, Sambucheto 2022) he held the position of deputy commander and distinguished himself for heroic actions in the field (such as in Fallascoso and in the Battle of Montecarotto) and for excellent tactical ability, recognized and praised by the Allied commands of the British 5th Army and the 2nd Polish Corps, as in the case of the victory of Monte Mauro. During the conflict he was wounded twice, but despite everything he continued to fight until the dissolution of the corps, which had been framed as a select mountain infantry unit in the 2nd Polish Corps of General Władysław Anders and of which he exercised effective command in action in coordination with the British and Polish liaison officers. The latter, in recognition of his daring in battle, decorated him with the Cross of Valor with Swords. He received similar attestations of esteem from Umberto of Savoy, both when he was Lieutenant General and as king in exile. In his last years, he loved to pass on the experiences of his youth to students, to warn them against the horrors of war.

=== Recognitions ===
In 2006, he was unanimously elected president of the Maiella Brigade Foundation. On August 2, 2009, a square in Gessopalena was dedicated to him, named "Piazza Domenico Troilo" and located near his home. In December 2011, a theatrical show was produced, written by Federica Vicino, called "Fino a scalfire le pietre" (Until the Stones are Scratched), directed by Claudio Di Scanno, with Susanna Costaglione, Maurizio Melchiorre (later replaced by Giuseppe Pomponio) and Massimo Leone, which traces the significant features of the Maiella Brigade and its deputy commander Domenico Troilo. Since 2016, the Officine Solidali Teatro company from Pescara has been performing the show "Sulla lunga linea di fuoco" (On the Long Line of Fire), written and directed by Federica Vicino, with Pascal Di Felice, Lorenzo and Enrico Valori, Erika Martelli, Romano Sarra, Egidio Colella, Maria Grazia Di Giulio, Prisca Giuliani and Giosuè Cianconi. The Officine Solidali production recounts the events of autumn 1943 in Abruzzo, and in particular the story of Domenico Troilo; and it has also been performed in England at the Italian Cultural Institute in London, with the support of the London section of ANPI.

== Bibliography ==
- Patricelli, Marco, Brigata Maiella. L'epopea dei volontari italiani nell'8ª Armata britannica, Rusconi libri, Santarcangelo (RN) 2021, pp. 394–395.
- Troilo, Domenico, Gruppo patrioti della Maiella, decorato di Medaglia d’Oro al Valore Militare alla Bandiera, Fondazione Pescarabruzzo, Gestioni Culturali, Sambucheto 2022.
