= Vincenzo Dapino =

Italian military officer

- Born: 28 August 1891; Turin, Kingdom of Italy
- Died: 11 July 1957 (aged 65)
- Military career
- Allegiance: Kingdom of Italy
- Branch: Royal Italian Army
- Rank: Brigadier General
- Commands: 8th Alpini Regiment; 58th Infantry Division "Legnano"; 1st Motorized Group
- Conflicts: Italo-Turkish War; First Italo-Senussi War; World War I; White War; Second Italo-Ethiopian War; World War II; Battle of the Western Alps; Greco-Italian War; Battle of Pindus; Italian campaign; Battle of San Pietro Infine
- Awards: Silver Medal of Military Valor; Bronze Medal of Military Valor; War Merit Cross; Military Order of Savoy; Order of the Crown of Italy

Vincenzo Cesare Dapino (Turin, 28 March 1891 – 11 July 1957) was an Italian general during World War II.

== Biography ==
He was born in Turin on March 28, 1891, the son of Paolo and Purma Dapino, and after enlisting in the Royal Italian Army he was appointed as a second lieutenant of the Alpini. On 19 May 1912 he left for Libya with the 7th Alpini Regiment, earning a bronze medal for military valor during the Italo-Turkish War. From 24 May 1915 he took part in the Great War in a company of skiers fighting on the Adamello, where he was wounded. In 1935 he fought in the Second Italo-Ethiopian War. After returning to Italy, starting from 1937 he served in the 19th Infantry Regiment, and in January 1939, with the rank of lieutenant colonel, he assumed command of the 8th Alpini Regiment, part of the 3rd Alpine Division "Julia".

After Italy entered the Second World War, on 10 June 1940, he initially took part in the brief campaign against France, and then in the Greek campaign until May 1941, being awarded a silver medal for military valor and the Knight's Cross of the Military Order of Savoy. During the battle of Pindus his regiment was surrounded by Greek troops and suffered heavy losses, but managed to break out of the encirclement and reach the Italian lines, after bitter fighting in freezing weather. On 1 July 1942 he was promoted to brigadier general, and became commander of the 58th Infantry Division "Legnano". At the signing of the Armistice of Cassibile, on 8 September 1943, his division was stationed in Apulia and remained in Allied-controlled territory, becoming part of the Italian Co-Belligerent Army.

On 29 September 1943 Dapino was given command of the 1st Motorized Group, the first combat unit of the Italian co-belligerent Army established to fight alongside the Allies for the liberation of Italy from the Germans. The 1st Motorized Group had its headquarters in San Pietro Vernotico and began training in Montesarchio, amidst great difficulties, under the direct control of the Allies. Dapino tried to obtain from the government the assignment of a special allowance for operations, in order to prevent the pay received by the Italian fighters from being excessively lower than that given by the U.S. Fifth Army to its own soldiers, which negatively affected the morale; as the government refused, he granted on his own initiative an extraordinary allowance of ten lire for the soldiers and eighteen for the non-commissioned officers, a fait accompli that was later approved by the Army General Staff. Dapino obtained from the Fifth Army a food table similar to the American one, but which did not include some kinds of comfort, such as wine and cigarettes; the Ministry of War in Brindisi refused to provide these goods, since "this groupment carries out activities in favor of the Allies and is supplied by them". Dapino then declared that in the absence of supplies, he would buy them on his own initiative, and would continue to distribute comfort items "whenever the troops need it. Soldiers who live for several days in mountain positions, in the cold and rain, without being able to set up tent and cook their rations and being subjected to continuous fire by the enemy, and units that make strenuous nocturnal corvées to carry ammunition, food and water to the frontline, do not carry out activities in favor of the Allies but represent the only troops of the Italian Army that are currently fighting".

Dapino commanded the 1st Motorized Group during the battle of Montelungo (16 December 1943), part of the battle of San Pietro Infine, where the Italian troops showed great valor but suffered heavy losses (40% of the infantry); on the following day, General Mark Wayne Clark, commander of the Fifth Army, sent him a congratulatory telegram: "I wish to congratulate the officers and soldiers of your command for the success of yesterday's attack on Monte Lungo at Point 343. This action demonstrates the determination of the Italian soldiers to free their country from German domination, a determination that may well serve as an example to the oppressed peoples of Europe". On 11 January 1944 Dapino left the command of the 1st Motorized Group to General Umberto Utili and entered service at the Army General Staff for special assignments, having been awarded the title of Officer of the Military Order of Savoy. After the end of the war he retired from active service, and died in July 1957.
