= Francesco Fuoco =

Italian philologist, economist and Catholic priest

- Born: 22 January 1774; Mignano Monte Lungo
- Died: 2 April 1841 (aged 67); Naples
- Occupation: Economist, philologist

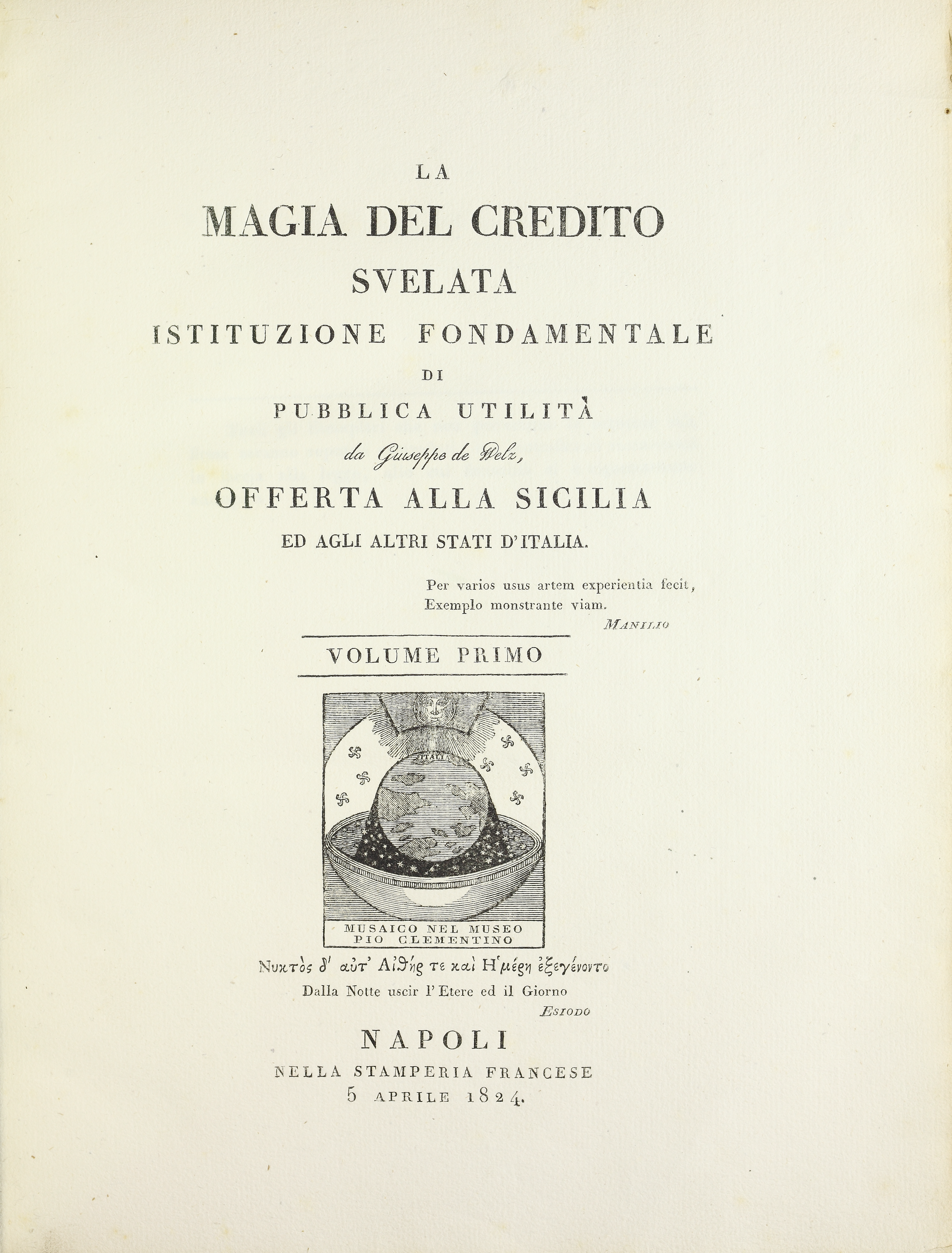
La magia del credito svelata (1824)

Francesco Fuoco (22 January 1774 – 2 April 1841) was an Italian philologist, economist and Catholic priest.

Some of his works were published under the name of Giuseppe De Welz, a banker from Como, who hired Fuoco as a ghost writer.

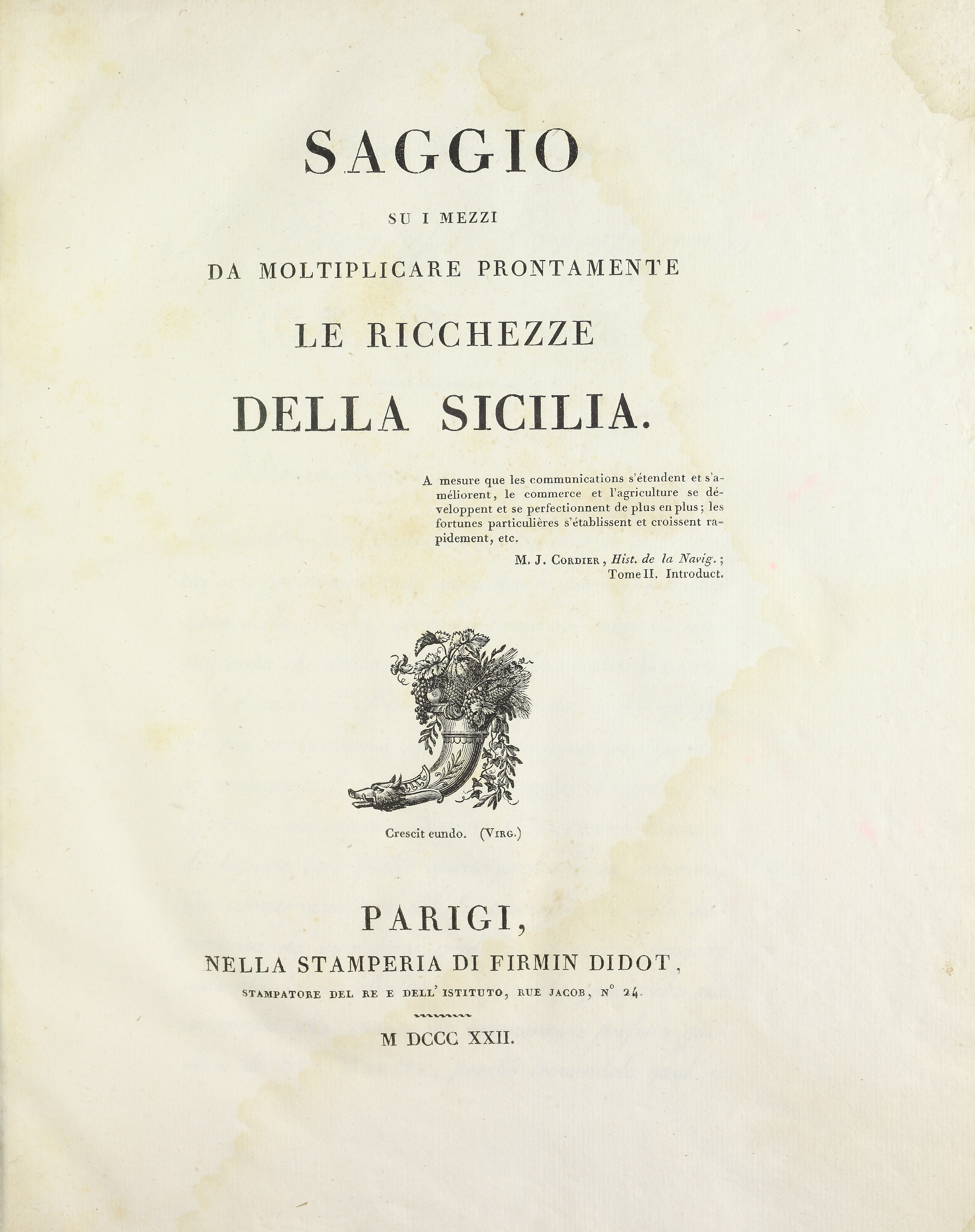
Saggio su i mezzi… (1822)

== Works ==
- Saggio su i mezzi da moltiplicare prontamente le ricchezze della Sicilia. Parigi: Firmin Didot. 1822.
- La magia del credito svelata. Vol. 1. Napoli: Stamperia Francese. 1824.
- La magia del credito svelata. Vol. 2. Napoli: Stamperia Francese. 1824.
