= Conca Casale =

- Comune
- Comune di Conca Casale
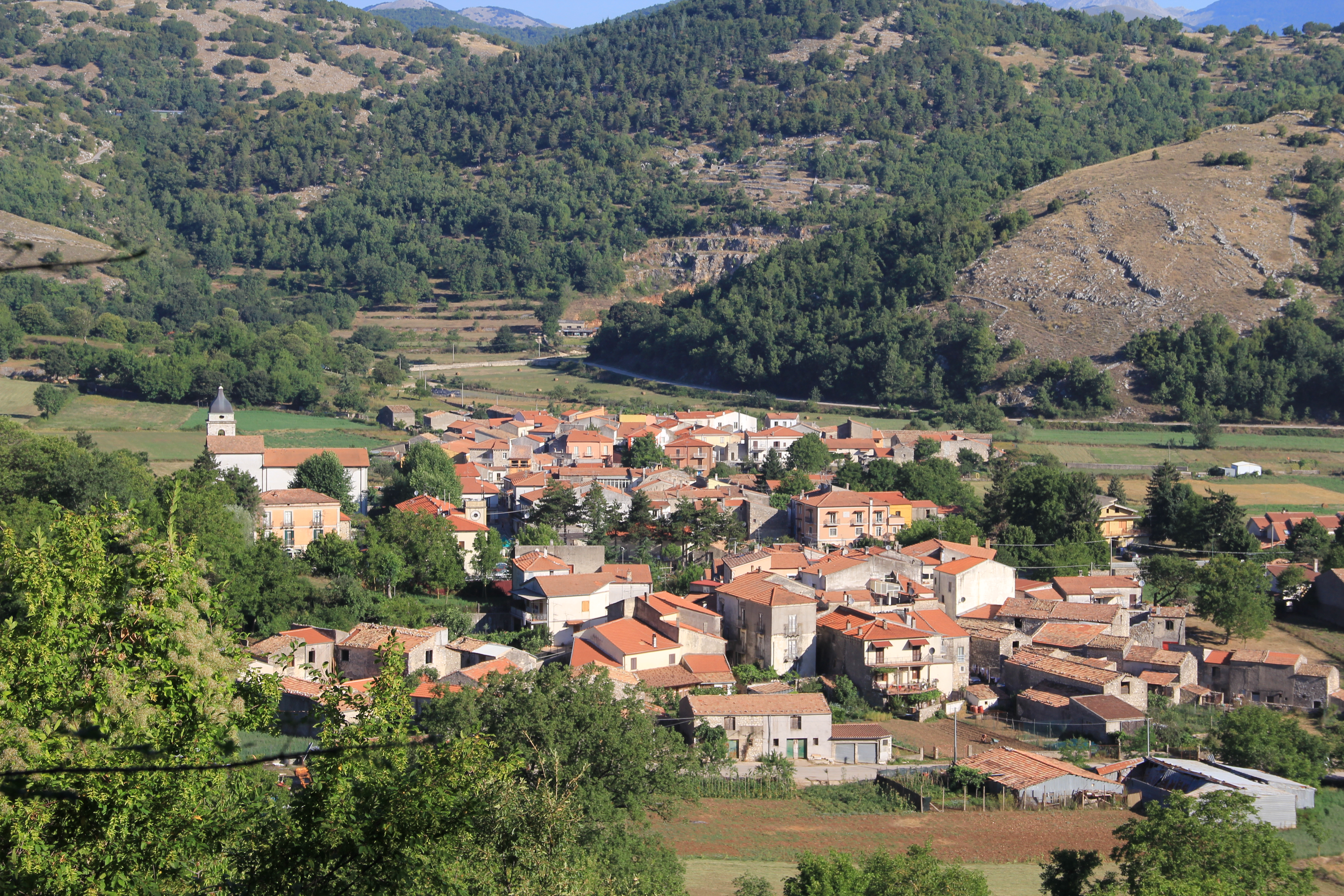
- View of Conca Casale

- Coat of arms

- Location within Italy Location within Molise
- Coordinates: 41°30′N 14°4′E
- Country: Italy
- Region: Molise
- Province: Isernia (IS)

Government
  - Mayor: Luciano Bucci

Area
  - Total: 14.5 km^{2} (5.6 sq mi)
- Elevation: 657 m (2,156 ft)

Population (30 June 2017)
  - Total: 188
  - Density: 13.0/km^{2} (33.6/sq mi)
- Demonym: Casalesi
- Time zone: UTC+1 (CET)
  - Summer (DST): UTC+2 (CEST)
- Postal code: 86070
- Dialing code: 0865
- Website: Official website

Conca Casale is a comune (municipality) in the Province of Isernia in the Italian region Molise, located about 50 kilometres (31 mi) west of Campobasso and about 20 kilometres (12 mi) southwest of Isernia.

Conca Casale borders the following municipalities: Pozzilli, San Vittore del Lazio, Venafro, Viticuso.
