= Cervaro =

- Comune
- Comune di Cervaro
- Coat of arms

- Location within Italy Location within Lazio
- Coordinates: 41°29′N 13°54′E
- Country: Italy
- Region: Lazio
- Province: Frosinone (FR)

Government
  - Mayor: Ennio Marrocco

Area
  - Total: 39.41 km^{2} (15.22 sq mi)
- Elevation: 250 m (820 ft)

Population (28 February 2017)
  - Total: 8,104
  - Density: 205.6/km^{2} (532.6/sq mi)
- Time zone: UTC+1 (CET)
  - Summer (DST): UTC+2 (CEST)
- Postal code: 03044
- Dialing code: 0776
- Patron saint: Maria SS. de' Piternis
- Saint day: September 8
- Website: Official website

Cervaro is a town and comune (municipality) in the Province of Frosinone in the Italian region Lazio. It is located in the Liri valley, about 130 kilometres (81 mi) southeast of Rome and about 50 kilometres (31 mi) southeast of Frosinone.

Cervaro borders the following municipalities: Cassino, San Vittore del Lazio, Sant'Elia Fiumerapido, Vallerotonda, Viticuso.

== History ==
Cervaro originated from a castle built here in the Early Middle Ages by abbot Petronax of Monte Cassino.

Cervaro was destroyed in the Battle of Monte Cassino during World War II.

== Main sights ==
- Church of Madonna de' Piternis
- Castle of Monte Trocchio, located in a hill reachable only on a long walk panoramic route. It is situated a short drive from the famous monastery of Monte Cassino.

The Abruzzo, Lazio and Molise National Park is not far.

== Transportation ==
The nearest airport is Rome Ciampino, with access also from Rome Fiumicino and Naples Airport.

Cervaro is easily reachable from Rome by train, bus or car from the Motorway A1 (Cassino exit). Cervaro is also connected by bus from the nearest villages and from the closest city of Cassino where buses link to other Lazio destinations. Cotral is the regional company which operates services in all Lazio.
