= Wilhelm Raapke =

German general (1896–1970)

Friedrich Henry Carl Albrecht Wilhelm Raapke
- Born: November 13, 1896; Marienwerder, West Prussia, German Empire
- Died: January 28, 1970 (aged 73); Hamburg, West Germany
- Military career
- Allegiance: German Empire; Weimar Republic; Nazi Germany
- Branch: Imperial German Army; Reichswehr; Heer
- Service years: 1914–1945
- Rank: Generalleutnant
- Unit: 71st Infantry Division
- Commands: 258th Artillery Regiment; 71st Infantry Division
- Conflicts: World War I; World War II; Invasion of Poland; Battle of France; Salerno Landings; Battle of Monte Cassino; Anzio Landing; Battle of Montecarotto; Operation Olive; Battle of the Gothic Line; Operation Spring Awakening
- Awards: German Cross in Gold; Clasp to the Iron Cross, 1st and 2nd class Iron Cross, 1st and 2nd class Eastern Front Medal; The Honour Cross of the World War 1914/1918; Long Service Cross, 1st Class (25 years); Long Service Cross, 3rd Class (12 years)

Friedrich Henry Carl Albrecht Wilhelm Raapke was a professional army officer who served in the military forces of Germany during the German Empire, the Weimar Republic and Nazi Germany. He fought in both world wars in staff and command positions, becoming a divisional commander and attaining the rank of Generalleutnant. After the end of the Second World War, he was captured and interned as a prisoner of war until 1947.

== Early life, World War I and interwar years ==
Raapke was born in Marienwerder (today, Kwidzyn, Poland) in the province of West Prussia, on 13 November 1896. He joined the Imperial German Army and served in the artillery during World War I, attaining the rank of Oberleutnant and earning the Iron Cross, 1st and 2nd class. He remained in the army through the peacetime Reichswehr and its conversion to the Wehrmacht in 1935. On 1 August of that year, he was appointed commander of the III artillery battalion of Artillery Regiment 12.

== World War II ==
On 1 September 1939, the day World War II began, he assumed command of the 258th Artillery Regiment, part of the 258th Infantry Division, which in turn was under the command of Generalmajor Walther Wollmann. Raapke's units were transferred to the Polish front at the end of September.

Subsequently, he was assigned to the western front as part of the 1st Army under Generaloberst Erwin von Witzleben, in the Saarland, facing the Maginot Line in Lorraine. Raapke's unit, along with the rest of the army, maintained a defensive position during the initial phase of the invasion of France. On 14 June 1940, the 1st Army went on the offensive and attacked the Maginot Line between Saint-Avold and Saarbrücken, achieving breakthroughs at multiple points.

In 1941, Raapke joined the general staff of Army Group Centre under Generalfeldmarschall Fedor von Bock, where he contributed to managing the army's role in Operation Barbarossa and subsequent campaigns in Russia. He remained in this position until early 1943.

On 14 March 1943, Raapke assumed command of the 71st Infantry Division, being promoted to Generalmajor on 1 June 1943. The division, completely re-formed in Denmark after its destruction at the Battle of Stalingrad, was transferred to Italy in September 1943. It participated in the fighting at Nettuno in January 1944 and Cassino in March of the same year, subsequently joining the XIV Panzer Corps, under the command of General Fridolin von Senger und Etterlin. For his leadership in these battles, Raapke was awarded the German Cross in Gold. He was promoted to Generalleutnant on 1 April 1944. During the war, he also was awarded the Clasp to the Iron Cross, 1st and 2nd class.

In the summer of 1944, after the defeat at Cassino and the Liberation of Rome, facing the Allied advance, Field Marshal Albert Kesselring adopted a delaying defensive tactic. Raapke's 71st Division was transferred to the Adriatic front, along with the 278th Division commanded by General Harry Hoppe. Raapke was tasked with counteracting the advance of the Maiella Brigade, then led by field commander Domenico Troilo, which, following the liberation of Abruzzo, was forcing German troops stationed in the Marche hinterland to retreat to rear area defensive positions, thus facilitating the progression of the Allies towards the Gothic Line.

As a result of the losses suffered in previous months, the division and its commander were granted a period of rest and reorganization in the areas of Trieste, Udine, and Gorizia, until 28 November 1944. On that date, the division was transferred to Hungary, where it took part in the final battles in the Lake Balaton area. On 15 January 1945, Raapke was transferred to the Oberkommando des Heeres (Army High Command) as a general for "special assignments".

== Captivity and post-war years ==
Raapke was captured by British forces in Schleswig-Holstein on 15 May 1945 and was interned at Island Farm, also known as Camp 198, a prisoner of war camp located on the outskirts of Bridgend, South Wales. The camp held numerous Axis prisoners, primarily Germans, and is remembered for being the site of the largest escape attempt by German prisoners of war in Great Britain during World War II. Towards the end of the conflict, it was renamed Special Camp 11 and used for the detention of many high-ranking military and SS leaders awaiting extradition for the Nuremberg trials.

On 10 October 1947, Raapke returned to Germany aboard the ship "El Nil" and settled in Hamburg, where he died on 28 January 1970.

== Bibliography ==
- Campana, Giuseppe (2002). Campana, Giuseppe (ed.). La battaglia di Ancona del 17-19 luglio 1944 e il II Corpo d'Armata polacco. Falconara M.ma (AN): Istituto regionale per la storia del movimento di liberazione nelle Marche, Errebi Grafiche Ripesi.
- Febo, Lucio (2024). Notti senza fine - La lotta epica della Brigata Maiella per la liberazione di Montecarotto dal nazifascismo. Ancona: Studio Graffa. ISBN 978-88-99071-32-5.
- Patricelli, Marco (2005). I banditi della libertà. La straordinaria storia della Brigata Maiella partigiani senza partito e soldati senza stellette. Turin: Utet. ISBN 978-88-7750-975-8.
- Patricelli, Marco (2013). Patrioti. Storia della Brigata Maiella alleata degli Alleati. Pescara: Ianieri. ISBN 978-88-97417-56-9.
- Patricelli, Marco (2022). Brigata Maiella. L'epopea dei patrioti italiani dell'8a Armata britannica. Santarcangelo di Romagna: Rusconi Libri. ISBN 978-88-18-03696-1.
- Sparapani, Sergio (2005). Sparapani, Sergio (ed.). La guerra nelle Marche (1943-1944). Ancona: il lavoro editoriale. ISBN 978-88-7663-383-6.
- Webb, James Jack (2025). Generals and Admirals of the Third Reich: For Country or Fuehrer. Vol. 3: P–Z. Havertown, PA: Casemate Publishers. ISBN 978-1-952-71518-1.
