= San Pietro Infine =

- Comune
- Comune di San Pietro Infine
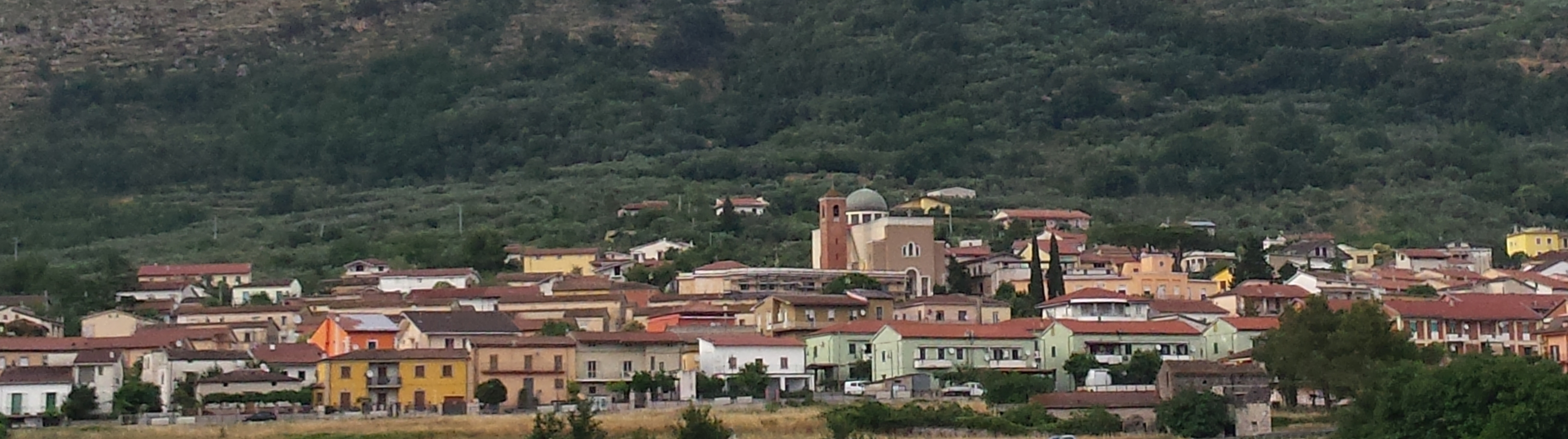

- Location within Italy Location within Campania
- Coordinates: 41°27′N 13°58′E
- Country: Italy
- Region: Campania
- Province: Caserta (CE)

Government
  - Mayor: Mariano Fuoco

Area
  - Total: 13.72 km^{2} (5.30 sq mi)
- Elevation: 140 m (460 ft)

Population (31 December 2010)
  - Total: 988
  - Density: 72.0/km^{2} (187/sq mi)
- Demonym: Sanpietresi
- Time zone: UTC+1 (CET)
  - Summer (DST): UTC+2 (CEST)
- Postal code: 81050
- Dialing code: 0823
- Website: Official website

San Pietro Infine is a comune (municipality) in the Province of Caserta in the Italian region Campania, located about 70 kilometres (43 mi) northwest of Naples and about 50 kilometres (31 mi) northwest of Caserta. San Pietro Infine borders the following municipalities: Mignano Monte Lungo, San Vittore del Lazio, Venafro.

== History ==
The area was contented by the Oscans and the Samnites in the 3rd century BC and was colonized by the Romans during the Third Samnite War. The burgh itself has medieval origins and was part of the territories of the Abbey of Monte Cassino.

The town was the site of a major military engagement in World War II and, thus, the subject of a well-known war-time documentary about that battle, The Battle of San Pietro, directed by John Huston. The modern town is actually a rebuilt version, with the older and original town — a few hundred meters away — having been totally destroyed in the war.

== Main sights ==
- Church of San Michele, with a 16th-century portal.
- Arch of the Barons, in Gothic style. It was probably the entrance of an ancient castle.
- Church of Madonna of the Water.
