= Italian Co-belligerent Army =

Pro-allied Italian armed forces

Italian Co-belligerent Army Esercito Cobelligerante Italiano
- Flag of Italy with the emblem of Savoia
- Active: 1943–1945
- Country: Kingdom of Italy
- Allegiance: King of Italy and Prime Minister
- Type: Army
- Role: Co-belligerent allied-resistance forces of the Kingdom of Italy's government in exile
- Size: 266,000 to 326,000
- Part of: Royal Italian Army
- Garrison/HQ: Brindisi
- Nickname: Army of the South
- Patron: King
- Engagements: World War II (Italian Civil War)

Commanders
- Ceremonial chief: Victor Emmanuel III
- Notable commanders: Umberto II; Pietro Badoglio; Giovanni Messe; Clemente Primieri; Umberto Utili

The Italian Co-belligerent Army (Italian: Esercito Cobelligerante Italiano), or Army of the South (Esercito del Sud), were names applied to various units of the now former Royal Italian Army during the period when they fought alongside the Allies during the Italian Campaign and civil war of World War II from October 1943 onwards. During the same period, the pro-allied Italian Royal Navy and Italian Royal Air Force were known as the Italian Co-belligerent Navy and Italian Co-belligerent Air Force respectively. From September 1943, pro-Axis Italian forces became the National Republican Army of the newly formed Italian Social Republic.

The Italian Co-belligerent Army was the result of the Allied armistice with Italy on 8 September 1943; King Victor Emmanuel III dismissed Benito Mussolini as Prime Minister in July 1943 following the Allied invasion of Southern Italy, and nominated Marshal of Italy (Maresciallo d'Italia) Pietro Badoglio instead, who later aligned Italy with the Allies to fight the Social Republic's forces and its German allies in Northern Italy.

The Italian Co-belligerent Army fielded between 266,000 and 326,000 troops in the Italian Campaign, of whom 20,000 (later augmented to 50,000, though some sources place this number as high as 99,000) were combat troops and between 150,000 and 190,000 were auxiliary and support troops, along with 66,000 personnel involved with traffic control and infrastructure defence. On the whole, the Italian Co-Belligerent Army made up 1/8 of the fighting force and 1/4 of the entire force of 15th Army Group of the Allied Forces.

== I Motorized Grouping ==
The first formation of the Co-belligerent Army was the I Motorized Grouping (Italian: I Raggruppamento Motorizzato) created on 27 November 1943 in San Pietro Vernotico near Brindisi. The units for the I Motorized Grouping were drawn from the 58th Infantry Division "Legnano" and 18th Infantry Division "Messina". Some of the soldiers who joined the unit had managed to evade capture and internment by German forces. The unit was composed of 295 officers and 5,387 men and was created to participate alongside the Allies against Germany and the Italian Social Republic in the Italian campaign. The unit was commanded by General Vincenzo Dapino, who led it during its first engagement in the Battle of San Pietro Infine in December of the same year. This action did much to remove the Allies' distrust of Italian soldiers fighting on their side. The unit suffered heavy casualties and was judged to have performed satisfactorily.

Following the service with the American Fifth Army and reorganization, command of the I Motorized Grouping was given to General Umberto Utili and the unit was transferred to the Polish II Corps on the extreme left of the British Eighth Army. In early 1944 the unit was reorganised and expanded into the Italian Liberation Corps.

== Italian Liberation Corps ==
On 18 April 1944, the I Motorized Grouping (now 16,000 men strong) assumed the name Italian Liberation Corps (Italian: Corpo Italiano di Liberazione, or CIL) and was divided into two brigades. The CIL was augmented with the 6,000 men strong 184th Infantry Division "Nembo". The CIL's commander was General Umberto Utili. In early 1944, a 5,000-man force of Italians fought on the Gustav Line around Monte Cassino and acquitted itself well. The Italians once again suffered heavy casualties.

== Italian Co-belligerent Army from late 1944 to 1945 ==
After the Battle of Filottrano in July 1944 the Italian government proposed to increase the number of Italian troops fighting on the Allied side. The proposal was accepted and in September 1944 the CIL was taken out of the line and sent to the rear to be equipped with British material, including British Battledress uniforms and Brodie helmets. On 24 September 1944, the CIL was disbanded and its personnel and units used to form the first combat groups: "Legnano" and "Folgore". Soon four more combat groups were formed: "Cremona", "Friuli", "Mantova", and "Piceno". These groups were equal in size to weak divisions. The established strength for each was 432 officers, 8,578 other ranks, 116 field guns, 170 mortars, 502 light machine guns, and 1,277 motor vehicles. The Combat Groups were given the names of old Royal Army divisions and followed the numbering system of older regiments to some extent. These groups were attached to various American and British formations on the Gothic Line. The following is the "order of battle" of the Italian Co-belligerent Army as of April 1945.

The Chief of Staff of the Armed Forces High Command was Marshal Giovanni Messe, while the Chief of Staff of the Army was Lieutenant General Paolo Berardi.

=== Combat groups ===
Each infantry regiment fielded three infantry battalions, a mortar company armed with British ML 3 inch mortars and an anti-tank company armed with British QF 6 pounder guns. The artillery regiments consisted of four artillery groups with British QF 25 pounder guns, one anti-tank group with British QF 17 pounder guns and one anti-air group armed with British versions of the Bofors 40mm gun.

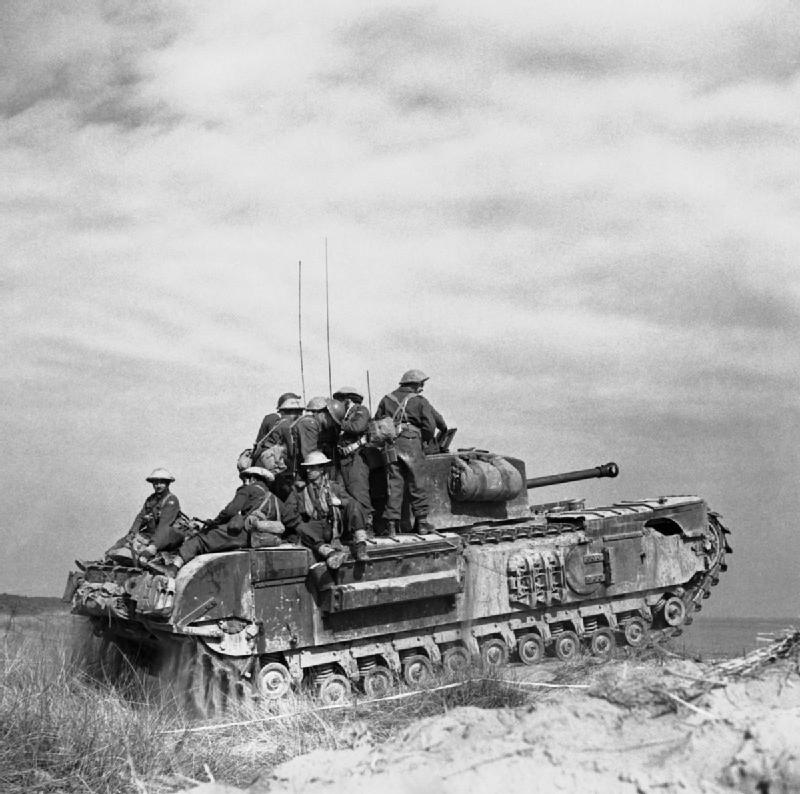
Churchill tank of 'C' Squadron, North Irish Horse carrying Italian infantry of 3rd Battalion, 21st Infantry Regiment "Cremona", north of Castel Borsetti, 2 March 1945

- Combat Group "Cremona", with men from the 44th Infantry Division "Cremona", attached to British V Corps – Major General Clemente Primieri
  - 21st Infantry Regiment "Cremona"
  - 22nd Infantry Regiment "Cremona"
  - 7th Artillery Regiment
  - CXLIV Engineer Battalion
- Combat Group "Friuli", with men from the 20th Infantry Division "Friuli", attached to British X Corps – Major General Arturo Scattini
  - 87th Infantry Regiment "Friuli" (III Battalion formed with Granatieri di Sardegna personnel)
  - 88th Infantry Regiment "Friuli" (III Battalion formed with Granatieri di Sardegna personnel)
  - 35th Artillery Regiment
  - CXX Engineer Battalion
- Combat Group "Folgore", with men from the 184th Infantry Division "Nembo", attached to British XIII Corps – Major General Giorgio Morigi
  - Paratroopers Regiment "Nembo"
  - Navy Regiment "San Marco"
  - Paratroopers Artillery Regiment "Folgore"
  - CLXXXIV Engineer Battalion
- Combat Group "Legnano", attached to US II Corps – Major General Umberto Utili
  - 68th Infantry Regiment "Legnano", with men from the 58th Infantry Division "Legnano"
  - Special Infantry Regiment, with 2x Alpini battalions (remnants of the 3rd Alpini Regiment of the 1st Alpine Division "Taurinense") and 1x Bersaglieri battalion (remnants of the 4th Bersaglieri Regiment)
  - 11th Artillery Regiment, with men from the 104th Infantry Division "Mantova"
  - LI Engineer Battalion
- Combat Group "Mantova" – Major General Bologna
  - 76th Infantry Regiment "Napoli", with men from the 54th Infantry Division "Napoli"
  - 114th Infantry Regiment "Mantova", with men from the 104th Infantry Division "Mantova"
  - 155th Artillery Regiment, with men from the 155th Infantry Division "Emilia"
  - CIV Engineer Battalion
- Combat Group "Piceno", with men from the 152nd Infantry Division "Piceno" – Major General Emanuele Beraudo di Pralormo
  - 235th Infantry Regiment "Piceno"
  - 336th Infantry Regiment "Piceno"
  - 152nd Artillery Regiment
  - CLII Engineer Battalion

=== Auxiliary divisions ===
In addition to the Combat Groups the Italian Co-belligerent Army included eight Auxiliary Divisions (Italian: Divisioni Ausiliarie) for labour, support and second-line duties. At its peak the division fielded about 150,000-190,000. These auxiliary units were the following:

- 205th Division, supported US Army Air Forces in the Mediterranean Command
  - 51st Aviation Group (Infantry and AA Artillery Air Force Regiment)
  - 52nd Aviation Group (Infantry and AA Artillery Air Force Regiment)
  - 53rd Aviation Group (Infantry and AA Artillery Air Force Regiment)
  - 54th Aviation Group (Infantry and AA Artillery Air Force Regiment)
  - 55th Aviation Group (Infantry and AA Artillery Air Force Regiment)
- 209th Division, supported 1st British District
- 210th Division, supported US Fifth Army
- 212th Division, the largest of the Auxiliary Divisions, at its height its complements exceeded 44,000 men providing rear area support from Naples to Pisa and Livorno
- 227th Division, supported 3rd British District
- 228th Division, supported UK Eighth Army
- 230th Division, supported British forces
  - 541st Infantry, Coast Artillery and AA Artillery Regiment
  - 403rd Pioneer and Labor Regiment (Engineer Corps)
  - 404th Pioneer and Labor Regiment (Engineer Corps)
  - 406th Pioneer and Labor Regiment (Engineer Corps)
  - 501st Security Battalion
  - 510th Security Battalion
  - 514th Security Battalion
  - XXI Supply Trains Group (Regiment-sized unit)
- 231st Division, supported the British XIII Corps of the US Fifth Army

On the whole the Italian Co-Belligerent Army made up 1/8 of the fighting force and 1/4 of the entire force of 15th Army Group of the Allied Forces.

=== Internal security divisions ===
Not directly dependent from the Allied Headquarters in Italy the Co-Belligerent Army also deployed three Internal Security Divisions (Divisioni di Sicurezza Interna) for internal security duties:

- Internal Security Division "Sabauda", in Enna on Sicily
  - I Security Brigade
    - 45th Infantry Regiment
    - 46th Infantry Regiment
  - II Security Brigade
    - 145th Infantry Regiment, detached from the 227th Coastal Division
    - 16th Field Artillery Regiment (without artillery pieces)
  - CXXX Engineer Battalion
- Internal Security Division "Aosta", in Palermo on Sicily
  - III Security Brigade
    - 5th Infantry Regiment
    - 6th Infantry Regiment
  - IV Security Brigade
    - 139th Infantry Regiment, detached from the 47th Infantry Division "Bari"
    - 22nd Field Artillery Regiment (without artillery pieces)
  - XXVIII Engineer Battalion
- Internal Security Division "Calabria", in Cagliari on Sardinia
  - V Security Brigade
    - 59th Infantry Regiment
    - 60th Infantry Regiment
  - VI Security Brigade
    - 236th Infantry Regiment, detached from the 152nd Infantry Division "Piceno"
    - 40th Field Artillery Regiment (without artillery pieces)
  - XXXI Engineer Battalion

== Italian Army ==
In 1946, the Kingdom of Italy became the Italian Republic. In a similar manner, what had been the royalist Co-Belligerent Army simply became the Italian Army (Esercito Italiano).

== Casualties ==
The Italian Liberation Corps suffered 1,868 killed and 5,187 wounded during the Italian campaign; the Italian Auxiliary Divisions lost 744 men killed, 2,202 wounded and 109 missing. Some sources estimate the overall number of members of the Italian regular forces killed on the Allied side as 5,927.

== Notable members ==
- Carlo Azeglio Ciampi, President of the Italian Republic from 1999 to 2006.
- Eugenio Corti
- Giovanni Messe
- Gianni Agnelli
- Valerio Zurlini
- Clemente Primieri
- Umberto Utili

== See also ==
- Italian Liberation Corps
- Italian Service Units
- Military history of Italy during World War II
- Italian Campaign in World War II
- Mediterranean Theatre of World War II
- Battle of Mignano Monte Lungo
- Battle of Bologna
- Operation Grapeshot
- Gothic Line
- Italian Royal Army, Kingdom of Italy
- Italian National Republican Army, Italian Social Republic
- Italian Co-Belligerent Air Force
- Italian Co-Belligerent Navy
- Co-belligerence
- Operation Herring, the last combat parachute jump in the European Theater of Operations, made by Italian troops.

== Sources ==
- Di Capua, Giovanni, Resistenzialità versus Resistenza, Rubettino, 2005, ISBN 88-498-1197-7
- Holland, James, Italy's Sorrow: A Year of War 1944-1945, St. Martin's Press, New York, ISBN 978-0-312-37396-2, ISBN 0-312-37396-1
- Jowett, Phillip, The Italian Army 1940-45 (3): Italy 1943-45, Osprey Publishing, Westminster, MD, ISBN 978-1-85532-866-2
- Mollo, Andrew, The Armed Forces of World War II, Crown Publishing, New York, ISBN 0-517-54478-4
