= Mignano Monte Lungo =

- Comune
- Comune di Mignano Monte Lungo
- Coat of arms

- Location within Italy Location within Campania
- Coordinates: 41°24′N 13°59′E
- Country: Italy
- Region: Campania
- Province: Caserta (CE)
- Frazioni: Campozillone, Caspoli, Moscuso

Government
  - Mayor: Antonio Verdone

Area
  - Total: 53.1 km^{2} (20.5 sq mi)
- Elevation: 137 m (449 ft)

Population (31 October 2017)
  - Total: 3,160
  - Density: 59.5/km^{2} (154/sq mi)
- Demonym: Mignanesi
- Time zone: UTC+1 (CET)
  - Summer (DST): UTC+2 (CEST)
- Postal code: 81049
- Dialing code: 0823
- Patron saint: St. Anthony of Padua
- Saint day: June 13
- Website: Official website

Mignano Monte Lungo is a comune (municipality) in the province of Caserta in the Italian region Campania, located about 70 kilometres (43 mi) northwest of Naples and about 45 kilometres (28 mi) northwest of Caserta.

Mignano Monte Lungo borders the following municipalities: Conca della Campania, Galluccio, Presenzano, Rocca d'Evandro, San Pietro Infine, San Vittore del Lazio, Sesto Campano, Venafro.

== History ==
The first settlers in the area were the Sidicini; the Etruscans founded here the town of Cesennia, which later passed under Roman control. After the fall of the Western Roman Empire, Mignano became part of the Lombard Duchy of Benevento and, in 776, part of the County of Capua. In 1139 the nearby Galluccio was the seat of a successful ambush of Roger II of Sicily's troops against the army of Pope Innocent II, who, captured, was forced to sign a treaty of peace in the Mignano castle.

After the Hohenstaufen and Angevine domination, the Aragonese gave it as a fief to Ettore Fieramosca. In 1581 his heir Ettore Leognano Fieramosca ceded it to Giulio Cesare De Capua. In 1734 the troops of Charles of Bourbon besieged here Marshal von Traun, who had to flee to Capua.

During World War II Mignano was the seat of fierce fightings, part of the Battle of San Pietro Infine. In order to facilitate their escapement, the German destroyed the fortress and the bridge on the Rava. The nearby Monte Lungo was conquered on December 16, 1943, by the Italian 1° Raggruppamento Motorizzato.

== Main sights ==
- The castle, of ancient origins, several times renewed. The current structure dates mostly to the interventions of Guido Fieramosca.
- Church of Santa Maria la Grande (16th century)
- Medieval Porta Fratte gate, now the only remainder of the old medieval walls.

== People ==
- Michelina Di Cesare, 19th century bandit
- Francesco Fuoco, economist

== See also ==
- Treaty of Mignano
- Battle of Cassino
- Battle of San Germano
