= San Vittore del Lazio =

- Comune
- Comune di San Vittore del Lazio
- Location within Italy Location within Lazio
- Coordinates: 41°28′N 13°56′E
- Country: Italy
- Region: Lazio
- Province: Frosinone (FR)

Government
  - Mayor: Nadia Bucci

Area
  - Total: 27.1 km^{2} (10.5 sq mi)
- Elevation: 210 m (690 ft)

Population (28 February 2017)
  - Total: 2,560
  - Density: 94.5/km^{2} (245/sq mi)
- Demonym: Sanvittoresi
- Time zone: UTC+1 (CET)
  - Summer (DST): UTC+2 (CEST)
- Postal code: 03040
- Dialing code: 0776
- Website: Official website

San Vittore del Lazio is a comune (municipality) in the Province of Frosinone in the Italian region Lazio, located about 130 kilometres (81 mi) east southeast of Rome and about 50 kilometres (31 mi) east southeast of Frosinone.

The castle of San Vittore has belonged to the Mancini family from the 15th century to the present.

San Vittore del Lazio borders the following municipalities: Cassino, Cervaro, Conca Casale, Mignano Monte Lungo, Rocca d'Evandro, San Pietro Infine, Venafro, Viticuso.
