= The Battle of San Pietro =

1945 documentary film directed by John Huston

- Directed by: John Huston
- Written by: John Huston
- Narrated by: John Huston
- Cinematography: Jules Buck
- Edited by: John Huston (uncredited)
- Music by: Dimitri Tiomkin
- Production company: Army Pictorial Service
- Distributed by: War Activities Committee of the Motion Pictures Industry
- Release date: May 3, 1945
- Running time: 32 minutes
- Country: United States
- Language: English

The Battle of San Pietro is a documentary film directed by John Huston about the Battle of San Pietro Infine, 60 mi (97 km) from Naples, during World War II. It was shot by Jules Buck. It was released in the US in 1945 but shown to US troops earlier.

Huston and his crew—which included the British novelist and screenwriter Eric Ambler—were attached to the U.S. Army’s 143rd Regiment of the 36th Division. Unlike with many other military documentaries, it was claimed Huston’s cameramen filmed alongside the infantrymen as they fought their way up the hills to reach San Pietro. However, Huston's claim that the film was made during the battle was proven false by the research of Peter Maslowski in his 1993 book, Armed With Cameras.

== Production ==
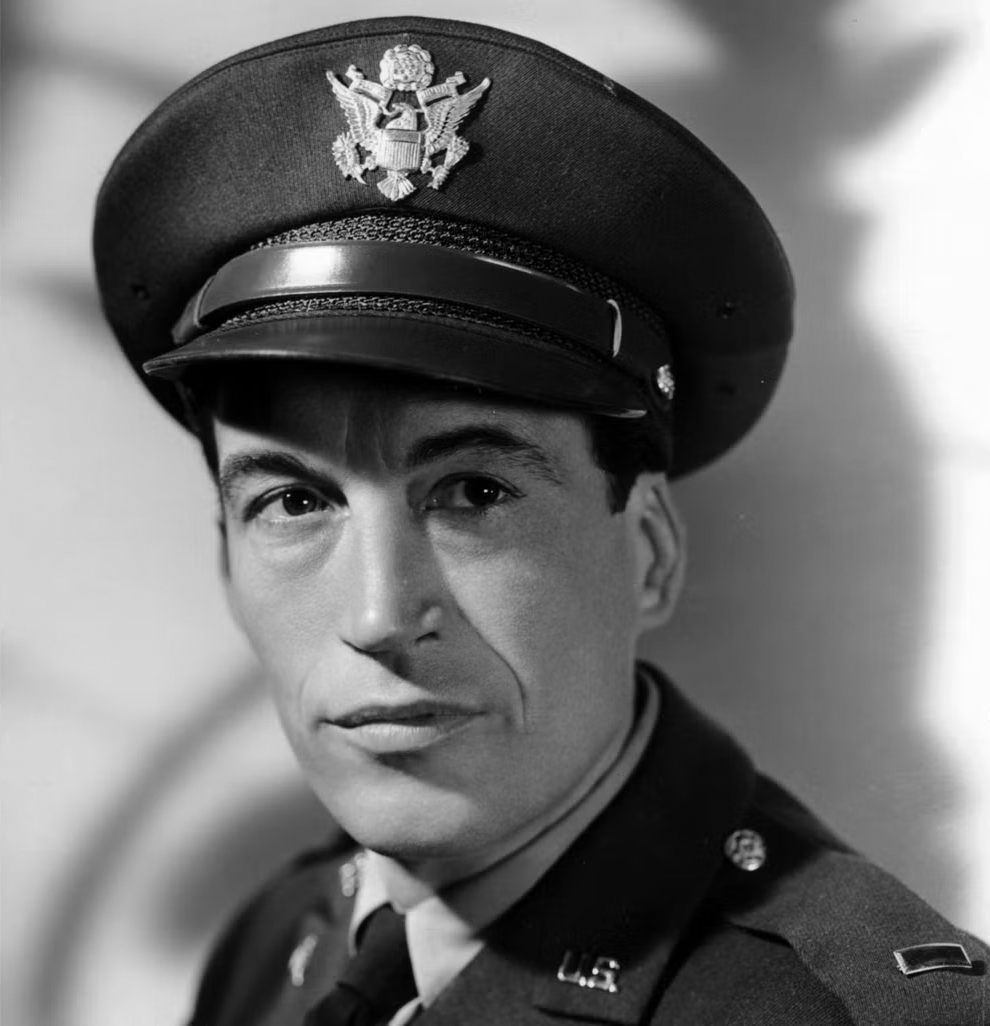
John Huston in uniform

The film was made to be intentionally more realistic than other examples of its genre. One scene includes close-up views of the faces of dead soldiers as they are being loaded into body bags, a level of realism unheard of in both fictional portrayals as well as newsreel footage of the time. The United States Army delayed its release to the public because it showed dead GIs wrapped in mattress covers; some officers tried to prevent soldiers in training from seeing it, for fear of damaging morale. General George Marshall came to Huston and took the film's defense, stating that because of the film's gritty realism, it would make a good training film. The depiction of death would inspire soldiers to take their training more seriously.

Huston quickly became unpopular with the Army, not only for the film but also for his response to the accusation that the film was anti-war. Huston responded that if he ever made a pro-war film, he should be shot. The film was screened to U.S. troops in North Africa in 1944, where John Horne Burns described it in a letter as "almost more than any heart can stand". Huston was no longer considered a pariah; he was decorated and eventually promoted to major.

== Reception ==
In 1991, The Battle of San Pietro was selected for preservation in the United States National Film Registry by the Library of Congress as being "culturally, historically, or aesthetically significant". The film was preserved by the Academy Film Archive in 2005.

== See also ==
- List of Allied propaganda films of World War II
- Treasures from American Film Archives
- The Battle of San Pietro. Radio play by Nick Perry, BBC, 27 April 2019

== Additional sources ==
- Aitken, Ian, ed. (2013). "The Battle of San Pietro". The Concise Routledge Encyclopedia of the Documentary Film. p. 71. ISBN 9781136512063 – via Google Books.
- Ambler, Eric (1985). Here Lies. Archived from the original on April 30, 2019 – via agorabooks.co.
