= List of CROWCASS suspects from the Kingdom of Italy =

The list of CROWCASS suspects from the Kingdom of Italy compiles individuals from the Kingdom of Italy who appear in the Central Registry of War Criminals and Security Suspects (CROWCASS). CROWCASS was created by Supreme Headquarters Allied Expeditionary Force in 1945 to assist the United Nations War Crimes Commission and Allied governments in tracing ex-enemy nationals suspected of committing war crimes or atrocities in Europe during the Second World War. This list summarizes entries for Italian nationals recorded in the Consolidated Wanted Lists and supplementary lists and follows the registry fields: Name, C.R. file number, rank, occupation or unit, place and date of the alleged offence, reason wanted, and requesting authority.

== Royal Italian Army ==
=== 5th Alpine Division "Pusteria" ===
The names of two men attached to the 5th Alpine Division "Pusteria" can be found in the Central Registry of War Criminals and Security Suspects:

- CIPRIANI Nanni — 190931 — Colonel Royal Italian Army, Commanding Officer Battalion "Bolzano", "Pusteria" — Div., 11.41, Cetinji-Savrick, Podgorica (Yugoslavia) 7., 11.41 — Murder — Yugoslavia
- ESPOSITO Giovanni — 190952 — General, Royal Italian Army, "Pusteria" — Div., Montenegro, Savnik (Yugoslavia) 1941 — Murder — Yugoslavia

=== 6th Alpine Division "Alpi Graie" ===
The names of two men attached to the 6th Alpine Division "Alpi Graie" can be found in the Central Registry of War Criminals and Security Suspects:

- GIROTTI Mario; 190934; Lieutenant General, Royal Italian Army, "Alpi Graie" — Div., Savnik Montenegro (Yugoslavia), 5., 6., 9.42; Torture; Yugoslavia
- PANATELLO Francesco; 191051; Official, Royal Italian Army, "Alpi Graie" — Div., Montenegro (Yugoslavia) 42; Torture; Yugoslavia

=== 6th Infantry Division "Cuneo" ===
The names of three men attached to the 6th Infantry Division "Cuneo" can be found in the Central Registry of War Criminals and Security Suspects:

- ANTIMANTO Vittorio; 300006; Lieutenant of Reserve, 7 Infantry Regiment "Cuneo" — Div., Serifos (Greece) 11.41 — 9.43; Misc. Crimes; Greece;
- LENTI Nicholas — 300295 — Major and Governor, Inf., 7 Infantry Regiment "Cuneo" — Div. Military of Naxos during the Italian Occupation, Island of Naxos 41-43 — Misc. Crimes — Greece;
- BELANI Peter — 304292 — Private, Artillery "Cuneo" — Div. from Milan (Italy), Minia Platanou (Samos) (Greece), 6.4.43 — Murder — Greece.

=== 12th Infantry Division "Sassari" ===
The names of eight men attached to the 12th Infantry Division "Sassari" can be found in the Central Registry of War Criminals and Security Suspects:

- BARBA — 250049 — Major, "Sassari" — Div., Kistanje (Yugoslavia) 6.41 — Pillage — Yugoslavia;
- BARBERO Pietro — 250048 — Colonel, XVIII Army Corps "Sassari" — Div., Biograd Betina, Vodice (Yugoslavia) 42 — Murder — Yugoslavia
- BERARDI Paolo — 149616 — General, Commander, "Sassari" — Div. (Yugoslavia) 1943 — Murder — Yugoslavia
- BORRUZO Pietro 190904 — Major, Royal Italian Army, 3. Battery, 151. Regt. Fanteria, "Sassari" — Div., Fara Slovenia (Yugoslavia), summer 41 — Murder — Yugoslavia
- GAZZINI (or GAZZINO) — 190971 — Colonel, Royal Italian Army, Rgt. of "Sassari" — Div. (F 559), Udbina Gracac (Yugoslavia) 1. and 2.43 — Murder — Yugoslavia
- GIANOPECO Francesco — 147278 — General, Royal Italian Army "Sassari" — Div. (Yugoslavia) 43 — Murder — Yugoslavia
- GLORIA — 147272 — General, Royal Italian Army, "Lombardia" Rgt., "Sassari" — Div. (Yugoslavia) 43 — Murder — Yugoslavia
- ZANOTTI — 191020 — Colonel, Royal Italian Army, Commanding Officer Regt., "Sassari" — Div., F. 562, Udbina, Gracac (Yugoslavia) 2. and 3.43 — Murder — Yugoslavia

=== 13th Infantry Division "Re" ===
The names of three men attached to the 13th Infantry Division "Re" can be found in the Central Registry of War Criminals and Security Suspects:

- LANTIERI — 145429 — Colonel, Army, "Re" — Div., Artillery Regiment, Slovenia, Croatia (Yugoslavia) 1943 — Murder — Yugoslavia;
- PALERMO — 191050 — Capt. of Carabinieri, Royal Italian Army, "Re" — Div., Otocac (Yugoslavia) 41-43 — Murder — Yugoslavia;
- PELLIGRA Raffaele (alias: PELIGRA) — 148979 — General, "Re" — Div., Gornji-Kozar, Kotar-Caber (Yugoslavia) 43 — Murder — Yugoslavia

=== 14th Infantry Division "Isonzo" ===
The names of 51 men attached to the 14th Infantry Division "Isonzo" can be found in the Central Registry of War Criminals and Security Suspects:

- BANCALARI — 149624 — Army, 23. Regt. Fant "Como" "Isonzo" — Div., Cernomelj (Yugoslavia) 43 — Murder — Yugoslavia
- BERARDI Manlio — 149617 — Lieutenant Colonel, Isonzo-Div., 24 Infantry Regiment Como (Yugoslavia) 1943 — Murder — Yugoslavia
- BIGLIO Felice -307261 — Seniore, cmdt., 117 Battalion at Mouronog, 98 Fascist Legion attached to Isonzo-Div., 42-43 — Murder — Yugoslavia
- BOLOGNE Vittorio — 144940 — Capt., 24. Infantry Regiment Como, Isonzo-Div. (Yugoslavia) 1943 — Murder — Yugoslavia
- BONOMO Giovanni — 149630 — Tenente Medico, Army, 24 Infantry Regiment Como, Isonzo-Div., (Yugoslavia) 1943 — Murder — Yugoslavia
- BURGIO Francesco — 145741 — Commander, Army, 98. Fascist Legion, "Isonzo" Div., Trebnje (Yugoslavia) 43 — Murder — Yugoslavia
- CALZA Carlo — 149626 -Lt., 24. Infantry Regiment Como, II. Battalion, Isonzo-Div. (Yugoslavia) 1943 — Murder — Yugoslavia
- CARLI Giovanni — 145734 -Lieutenant Colonel, Isonzo-Div., Novo Mesto (Yugoslavia) 43 — Murder — Yugoslavia
- CASSETTO Pietro — 145729 -Major, 24.Infantry Regiment Como, Isonzo-Div., (Yugoslavia) 43 — Murder — Yugoslavia
- CIRILO Antonio — 145712 -Lt., Doctor, Isonzo-Div., 24 Infantry Regiment Como (Yugoslavia) 43 — Murder — Yugoslavia
- COCCOMARELLA Vincenzo — 145703 — Colonel, 24 Infantry Regiment Como, Isonzo-Div., Novo Mesto (Yugoslavia) 1943 — Murder — Yugoslavia
- CONSTANTINI Dr. Constantino — 145695 — Dr., Tenente Medico, 25 Infantry Regiment Como, Isonzo-Div., Cernomelj (Yugoslavia) 1943 — Murder — Yugoslavia
- CORONATI Emilio — 145690 — General, Inf. Div., Isonzo — part of XI Corpo d'Armata, Novo Mesto (Yugoslavia) 1942 — Murder — Yugoslavia
- DELMANTO Osvaldo — 150895 — Sottotenente, Royal Italian Army, Isonzo-Div. (Yugoslavia) 42-43 — Murder — Yugoslavia
- FARINA Guido — 148312 — Colonel, Army, Inf. Rgt. 23, "Como", "Isonzo" — Div., Cernomelj (Yugoslavia) 43 — Murder — Yugoslavia
- FERRARI Arturo — 148311 — Lt., Army, "Isonzo" — Div., 24 Inf. Rgt. "Como" (Yugoslavia) 43 — Murder — Yugoslavia
- FRACASSO Arsenio — 148305 — Dr., "Isonzo" — Div., 24 Inf. Rgt."Como" (Yugoslavia) 43 — Murder — Yugoslavia
- GALLI Giuseppe — 147286 — Sottotenente, 23 Rgt., Como, Royal Italian Army, Isonzo Div., 1 Battalion, — Murder — YugoslaviaCernomelj (Yugoslavia) 43
- GALLO Rufino — 147283 — Sottotenente, 24 Inf. Rgt., Royal Italian Army, Como, Isonzo Div. (Yugoslavia) 43 — Murder — Yugoslavia
- GIOVARELLI Fernando — 147275 — Sottotenente, Royal Italian Army, 23 Inf. Rgt. "Como", "Isonzo" Div., — Murder — Yugoslavia
- GIURA Luigi — 147273 — Centurione, Royal Italian Army, "Isonzo" — Div., 98 Fasc. Leg., 3 Coy, Trebnie (Yugoslavia) 43 — Murder — Yugoslavia
- GOBBO Dr. — 147271 — Dr., Tenente Medico, Royal Italian Army, 23 Inf. Rgt. "Como", "Isonzo" — Div., Cernomeli (Yugoslavia) 43 — Murder — Yugoslavia
- Guazzo Angelo — 147267 — Colonel, Royal Italian Army, 6 Artl. Regt., Isonzo-Div., Novo Mesto (Yugoslavia) — Murder — Yugoslavia
- GUERRINI Remo — 147265 — Centurione, Royal Italian Army, "Isonzo" — Div., 98 Fascist Legion, Velaloka (Yugoslavia) 1943 — Murder — Yugoslavia
- GUTIERREZ A. — 147264 — Royal Italian Army, Isonzo-Div., 23 Regt. Como, Cernomeli (Yugoslavia) 43 — Murder — Yugoslavia
- LA SPADA Michelangelo — 146308 — Lt., Royal Italian Army, Isonzo-Div, 23 Infantry Regiment, Cernomels (Yugoslavia) 1943 — Murder — Yugoslavia
- LIPARI Ignazio — 145427 — Lieutenant Medico, Isonzo Div., 23 Inf. Rgt. Como, Cernomelj (Yugoslavia) 43 — Murder — Yugo
- LODI Giorgio -¨145426 — Lieutenant Colonel, Isonzo Div., 23 Inf. Rgt. Como (Yugoslavia) 43 — Murder — Yugoslavia
- LOUSIER (LOUVIER?) Edoardo — 145424 — Capt., "Isonzo" Div., 98 Fascist Legion, Trebnje (Yugoslavia) 43 — Murder — Yugoslavia
- LO VULLO Luigi — 145423 — Major, Isonzo Div., 24 Inf. Rgt. Como (Yugoslavia) — Murder — Yugoslavia
- MACCHI Antonio — 145480 — Capt., 24 Inf. Rgt. Como, III Battalion Isonzo Div. (Yugoslavia) 43 — Murder — Yugoslavia
- MARAZZA A. — 145471 — Maggiore Aiutante, Isonzo Div., 23 Inf. Rgt. Como, Cernomelj (Yugoslavia) 43 — Murder — Yugoslavia
- MARCHETTI Vincenzo — 145472 — Lt., Isonzo Div., 24 Inf. Rgt. Como (Yugoslavia) 43 — Murder — Yugoslavia
- MEZZI Adraste — 145484 — Lieutenant Colonel, "Isonzo" — Div., 24 Infantry Regiment"Como" (Yugoslavia) 1943 — Murder — Yugoslavia
- MOCCIA Alfonso — 145468 — Major, "Isonzo" — Div., 98 Fascist Legion, 117 Battalion, 1943 — Murder — Yugoslavia
- NONNI Dr. Carlo — 145636 — Lt., Doctor, Isonzo-Div., 24 Infantry Regiment "Como" (Yugoslavia) — Murder — Yugoslavia
- ORIFICI Domenico — 148666 — Colonel, "Isonzo" — Div., 24 Infantry Regiment "Como" , (Yugoslavia) 43 — Murder — Yugoslavia
- ORIOLI Antonio — 148665 — Capt., "Isonzo" — Div., 98 Fascist Legion, 1 Coy., Rakovnik (Yugoslavia) 1943 — Murder — Yugoslavia
- ORSONI Jose — 148663 — Lieutenant (Med.), "Isonzo" — Div., 23 Infantry Regiment "Como", Cernomelj (Yugoslavia) 43 — Murder — Yugoslavia
- PELAZZI Antonio — 149078 — Colonel, Royal Italian Army, "Isonzo" Div., Trebnje (Yugoslavia) — Murder — Yugoslavia, UNWCC
- PINELLI Corrado — 149986 — Capt., Isonzo-Div., 23 Regt. Fant. Como, Royal Italian Army, Cernomelj (Yugoslavia) — Murder — Yugoslavia
- POZZUOLI Angelo — 149088 — Lt., Royal Italian Army, "Isonzo" — Div., 24 Infantry Regiment "Como" (Yugoslavia) — Murder — Yugoslavia, UNWCC
- RENZO Eduardo — 148642 — Capt., Army, Isonzo-Div., 24 Infantry Regiment "Como" (Yugoslavia) 43 — Murder — Yugoslavia
- ROCCAFORTE Filadelfo — 191079 — Capt., Italy Army, 6 Art. Regt., "Isonzo" — Div., Commander, Straza (Yugoslavia) 43 — Murder — Yugoslavia
- ROCCO G. — 148640 — Dr., Capt., "Isonzo" — Div., 23 Regt. "Como", Cernomelj (Yugoslavia) — 1943 — Murder — Yugoslavia
- ROSANO Raffaello — 148636 — Capt., "Isonzo" Div., 98, Fascist Legion, 43 — Murder — Yugoslavia
- SAVARINO F. — 191094 — Major, Commander II Battalion 23 Inf. Rgt. Como, Isonzo Div., District of Cernomelj (Yugoslavia) 11.8.42 — Murder — Yugoslavia
- SCARPERIA G. — 146316 — Lt.-Colonel, Royal Italian Army, "Isonzo" Div., 23 Rgt., Cernomelj (Yugoslavia) 43 — Murder — Yugoslavia
- SOFIA Mario — 146311 — Lt., Royal Italian Army, "Isonzo" — Div., 24 Infantry Regiment, 1 Battalion, (Yugoslavia) 45 — Murder — Yugoslavia
- SPERANDIO Rinaldo — 146307 — Cpl., Royal Italian Army, "Isonzo" — Div., 98 Legion, 3 Coy., 117 Battalion, 1943 — Murder — Yugoslavia
- ZANNI Enzo — 144989 — Lt., Royal Italian Army, "Isonzo" — Div., 24 Infantry Regiment "Como", (Yugoslavia) 1943 — Murder — Yugoslavia

=== 15th Infantry Division "Bergamo" ===
The names of three men attached to the 15th Infantry Division "Bergamo" can be found in the Central Registry of War Criminals and Security Suspects:

- FORESIO – 190961 – Commandant, Royal Italian Army, Div. "Bergamo", Sibenik (Yugoslavia) 9.6.43 – Murder – Yugoslavia;
- GRIMALDI Paolo – 190980 – Lieutenant General, Royal Italian Army Div. "Bergamo", Sibenik (Yugoslavia) 41–43 – Murder – Yugoslavia;
- PIAZZONI Alessandro – 149085 – Lieutenant General, Royal Italian Army, "Bergamo" Div., Bickovo (Yugoslavia) 42 – Torture – Yugoslavia

=== 18th Infantry Division "Messina" ===
The names of eight men attached to the 18th Infantry Division "Messina" can be found in the Central Registry of War Criminals and Security Suspects:

- AMATO Attilio — 195528 — General, Royal Italian Army, Div. Messina, Korcula (Yugoslavia) 15.1.43 — Murder — Yugoslavia
- CAPRIOLO Giorgio — 190914 — Adjutant, Div. Messina, aide de camp, Berane (Yugoslavia) 7.-9.41 — Murder — Yugoslavia
- MARUSSICH (or MARUSIC) — 191008 — Agent, Capt., Pol.-Ital., C.C., Div. Messina, Montenegro, Fraschette Alatri (Yugoslavia; Italy) 41-42 — Murder — Yugoslavia
- NICOSIA Salvatore — 191154 — Major, Inf.Div. Messina", Procuratore dell'Imperatore, Cetinje (Yugoslavia) 1941 — Murder — Yugoslavia
- OGRISSEC — 191044 — Capt., Royal Italian Army, Div. "Messina", Montenegro (Yugoslavia) 13.7.41, spring 1942 — Murder — Yugoslavia
- PAVISSICH — 191057 — Capt., Royal Italian Army, Div. "Messino", Montenegro (Yugoslavia) 13.7.41-42 — Murder — Yugoslavia
- RAGOZZI Guido — 191075 — Lieutenant Colonel, Royal Italian Army, Commander of Battalion of the Div. "Messina", Prov. Montenegro (Yugoslavia) 31.7.41-spring 42 — Murder — Yugoslavia
- TUCCI Carlo — 193558 — Lieutenant General, G.Commanding Officer "Messina" Div., Montenegro (Yugoslavia) 7.41 — Murder — Yugoslavia

=== 19th Infantry Division "Venezia" ===
The names of twelve men attached to the 19th Infantry Division "Venezia" can be found in the Central Registry of War Criminals and Security Suspects:

- BASOLCHI — 259134 — Maggiore, cmdt., Venezia Div., Battalion Bijelo Polje, Montenegro 41-43 — Misc. Crimes — Yugoslavia
- BONGIOVANNI Giuseppe — 190902 — Colonel, Royal Italian Army, 1 Battalion 83. Regt. Div. "Venezia", Podgorica Montenegro (Yugoslavia) 9., 10. 11.41, 8-43 — Murder — Yugoslavia
- BONINI Silvio — 189907 — Generale-Commandant, Div. Venezia, Berane, Montenegro 41-43 — Suspect — Yugoslavia
- BULIONI Italo — 259132 — Major, Venezia Div., 1 Battalion, 84. Regt., Andrijevica Montenegro (Yugoslavia) 8.41-9.42 — Misc. Crimes — Yugoslavia
- CERETANI — 189902 — Major, Venezia Army, Montenegro (Yugoslavia) — Pillage — Yugoslavia
- CRISTICIANI David (1918) — 259174 — Tenente, deputy Carabinieri Commander, Venezia-Div., Berane Montenegro (Yugoslavia) 41-43 — Misc. Crimes — Yugoslavia
- FOPIANO Mario — 190960 — Major, Royal Italian Army, Battalion of "Venezia", Div., Kolasin and Area (Yugoslavia) 8.43 — Murder — Yugoslavia
- GIMELLI Fernando — 259129 — Maggiore, Commandant, II Battalion, 84 Rgt., Venezia Div., Berane Montenegro 41-43 — Misc. crimes — Yugoslavia
- GUGLIOTTI — 302151 — Lt., 8 Coy., 2 Battalion, 83 Regt., "Venezia" — Div., Montenegro (Yugoslavia) 9.-11.41 and 8.43 — Murder — Yugoslavia
- MARINO Umberto — 191004 — Commandant, Royal Italian Army, II Battalion, 8 Coy, Div. Venezia, Trebsljevo-Kolasin (Yugoslavia) 41 — Murder — Yugoslavia
- PISTOGLIESI — 259108 — Carabiniere, "Venezia" — Div., Berane Montenegro (Yugoslavia) 8.41-9.43 — Misc. crimes — Yugoslavia
- SCONOCHI Paolo (circa 1911) — 259127 — Capt., Cmdt., Carabinieri, Venezia-Div., Berane (Yugoslavia) 8.42-9.43 — Misc. crimes — Yugoslavia

=== 21st Infantry Division "Granatieri di Sardegna" ===
The names of four men attached to the 21st Infantry Division "Granatieri di Sardegna" can be found in the Central Registry of War Criminals and Security Suspects:

- ORLANDO Tadeo — 148664 — General, "Granatieri di Sardegna" Div., XI Army Corps (Yugoslavia) 43 — Murder — Yugoslavia
- PASQUALE Giuseppe — 253276 — Chief, 21 Battalion Sardinia Gren. Div. Executive Section, Ljubljana (Yugoslavia) 42 — Misc. crimes — Yugoslavia
- PERNA U. — 191060 — Commander, Royal Italian Army, 2 "Granatieri di Sardegna", Blocice Slovenia (Yugoslavia) 25.-28.6.42 — Pillage — Yugoslavia
- ZANINI — 250586 — Chief, Ex. Off., 21 Battalion, Sardinia Gren.-Div., Ljubljana (Yugoslavia) 42 — Torture — Yugoslavia

=== 22nd Infantry Division "Cacciatori delle Alpi" ===
The names of two men attached to the 22nd Infantry Division "Cacciatori delle Alpi" can be found in the Central Registry of War Criminals and Security Suspects:

- PIVANO — 191068 — General, Royal Italian Army commander of "Cacciatori delle Alpi", Dubide Niksic (Yugoslavia) 10.8.41 — Torture — Yugoslavia;
- RUGGERO Vittorio — 148635 — General — "Cacciatori delle Alpi" Div., Ljubljana (Yugoslavia) 43 — Murder — Yugoslavia

=== 23rd Infantry Division "Ferrara" ===
The names of twelve men attached to the 23rd Infantry Division "Ferrara" can be found in the Central Registry of War Criminals and Security Suspects:

- BOCCA — 190899 — Colonel, Royal Italian Army, 82. Battalion, Div. Ferrara, Sarnik Montenegro (Yugoslavia) 5.,6.43 — Murder — Yugoslavia
- CIPRIANI — 190932 — Cpl., Royal Italian Army, Div. Ferrara, Kapino-Polje (Yugoslavia) 6.43 — Murder — Yugoslavia
- DAVELA Giuseppe — 190946 — Officer, Royal Italian Army, Div. Ferrara, Rastok, Montenegro (Yugoslavia) 3.42 — Murder — Yugoslavia
- FRANCESCHINI Mario — 190963 — General, Royal Italian Army, Div. Ferrara, Savnik Montenegro (Yugoslavia) 5.-6.42 — Murder — Yugoslavia
- GERMANO Francesco — 190976 — Colonel, Royal Italian Army, Unit Ferrara Div., Montenegro (Yugoslavia) 5.43 — Murder — Yugoslavia
- GUIDO Francesco — 190982 — Sgt., Royal Italian Army, Div. "Ferrara", Kapino Polje Montenegro (Yugoslavia) 6.43 — Murder — Yugoslavia
- MAINERI — 193553 — Lieutenant General, Royal Italian Army, Commander of 23 "Ferrara" — Div., Niksic (Yugoslavia) — Murder — Yugoslavia
- PANARELLI Francesco 149074 Lt., Royal Italian Army "Ferrara" Div., Carabinieri, Montenegro (Yugoslavia) — Murder — Yugoslavia
- ROSCIOLI Giuseppe — 191085 — Colonel, Royal Italian Army, 47 Rgt."Dolla" Div. "Ferrara", Savnik, Montenegro (Yugoslavia) 43 — Murder — Yugoslavia
- SANTIS DE VINCENZO Eugenio — 191165 — Commander, III Btty. 14 Artillery Rgt., Ferrara Div., Savnik Montenegro (Yugoslavia) 5.-6.43 — Murder — U.K.
- TABANELLI — 191122 — Fascist, Officer of C.C., N.N. at Ferrara Div., Kapino Polje Nikso, Montenegro (Yugoslavia) 6.43 — Murder — Yugoslavia
- ZANI Francesco — 144987 — Officer, Royal Italian Army, Ferrara-Div., Montenegro (Yugoslavia) 1943 — Murder — Yugoslavia

=== 24th Infantry Division "Pinerolo" ===
The names of five men attached to the 24th Infantry Division "Pinerolo" can be found in the Central Registry of War Criminals and Security Suspects:

- BENELLI Cesare — 300174 — Lieutenant Colonel, "Pinerolo" Div., C.C. Larissa Andarea 41-43 — Murder — Greece
- DEL GIUDICE — 300613 — Colonel, Maj-Gen., Commander of the Pinerolo-Div., Town-Mayor of Kastoria, officer commanding Occupation Army, Kastoria, Nestorion, Argos, Orestikon (Greece) 42-43 — Murder — Greece
- FESTI Antonio — 300249 — Major, Commanding a Battalion, Blackshirts, Pinerolo-Div., Elassona Area, Domenika, Livadia, 1.10.42-16.2.43 — Murder — Greece
- INFANTE Adolfo — 305195 — Lieutenant General, Commander, "Pinerolo" — Div., Almiros, Thessaly (Greece) 15.8.-18.8.43 — Misc. Crimes — Greece
- VALI Antonio — 305340 — Major, Commanding Officer, 120 Battalion of Blackshirts quartered at Elassona, Pinerolo Div., Elassona Area (Greece) 42-43 — Misc. crimes — Greece

=== 32nd Infantry Division "Marche" ===
The names of 29 men attached to the 32nd Infantry Division "Marche" can be found in the Central Registry of War Criminals and Security Suspects:

- BIZARRI Vincenzo — 259099 — Capt., Royal Italian Army, 56. Regt., Marche Div., Stolac (Yugoslavia) 4.41-9.42 — Murder — Yugoslavia
- BUCARI Giorgio — 259106 -Lieutenant Royal Italian Army, 56. Regt., "Marche" — Div., Stolag (Yugoslavia) 4.41-9.42 — Murder — Yugoslavia
- BULLO Attilio — 259194 — Lt., Royal Italian Army, Marche-Div., 56. Regt. Stolac (Yugoslavia) 4.41-9.42 — Murder — Yugoslavia
- CAPIGATI GIUSEPPE — 259105 — Lt.Colonel Royal Italian Army, 56.Regt. "Marche" Div., Stolag (Yugoslavia) — 4.41-9.42 — Murder — Yugoslavia
- CAPITANO Gino — 190913 — Major Royal Italian Army, 55.Regt. "Marche" Div., Trebine (Yugoslavia) 20.4.41-8.9.43 — Murder — Yugoslavia
- CARELLI Giuseppe — 190915 — Major, Royal Italian Army, 53. Regt., Marche Div., Trebinje (Yugoslavia) 20.4.41-8.9.43 — Murder — Yugoslavia
- CAVALERRI Giorgio — 259123 — Lt., Royal Italian Army, 56 Regt., Marche-Div., Stolag (Yugoslavia) 4.41-9.42 — Murder — Yugoslavia
- CIAMPAULO Rolando — 259104 — Lieutenant Royal Italian Army, 56 Regt., Marche-Div., Stolac (Yugoslavia) 4.41-9.42 — Murder — Yugoslavia
- DAGLI ALBERI Delio — 259100 — Lt., Royal Italian Army, 56. Regt., Marche-Div., Stolac (Yugoslavia) 4.41-9.42 — Murder — Yugoslavia
- DE GUIDA — 190981 — Colonel Royal Italian Army, 51 Regt. of Marche-Div., Trebinje (Yugoslavia) 42-43 — Murder — Yugoslavia
- FALCOMARE Marcello — 259193 — Lt., Royal Italian Army, "Marche" Div., 56 Rgt., Stolac (Yugoslavia) 41-9.42 — Murder — Yugoslavia
- FARESSIN Emilio — 259192 — Lt., Royal Italian Army, "Marche" — Div., 56. Rgt., Stolac (Yugoslavia) 4.41-9.42 — Murder — Yugoslavia
- FISCHETTI Ettore — 190959 — Lt., Royal Italian Army, 56 Inf. Rgt., 1 Battalion, I A Coy., Div. "Marche", Mostar (Yugoslavia) 42 — Pillage — Yugoslavia
- GUGLIELMINO Antonio — 259103 — Lt., Royal Italian Army, 56 Regt., "Marche" — Div., Stolac (Yugoslavia) 4.41-9.42 — Murder — Yugoslavia
- INGEGNI Pasquale — 259121 — Lt., Royal Italian Army, 56 Regt., "Marche" — Div., Stolac (Yugoslavia) 4.41-9.42 — Murder — Yugoslavia
- LUCIANO — 259190 — Lieutenant Royal Italian Army, Marche Div., 56 Rgt., Stolac (Yugoslavia) 4.41-9.42 — Murder — Yugoslavia
- LUPARELLI Enzo — 259189 — Lieutenant Royal Italian Army, Marche Div., 56 Rgt., Stolac (Yugoslavia) 4.41-9.42 — Murder — Yugoslavia
- LUZANO Alessandro — 190994 — Lt., General, Royal Italian Army, 55 Rgt. "Marche" Div., Trebinje (Yugoslavia) 41-43 — Murder — Yugoslavia
- MONTALTO Rino — 191031 — Capt. of Carabinieri, Royal Italian Army, 55 Regt., "Marche" — Div., Trebinje (Yugoslavia) 20.4.41- 8.9.43 — Murder — Yugoslavia
- MONTESSI Enzo — 259122 — Lt., Royal Italian Army, 56 Regt. "Marche" — Div., Stolac (Yugoslavia) 4.41-9.42 — Murder — Yugoslavia
- MUSSI Bruno — 259188 — Lt., Royal Italian Army, "Marche" — Div., 56 Regt., Stolac (Yugoslavia) 4.41-9.42 — Murder — Yugoslavia
- NOLLI Stefano — 259120 — Lt., Royal Italian Army, 56 Regt., "Marche" — Div., Stolac (Yugoslavia) 4.41-8.42 — Murder — Yugoslavia
- PELEGRINO Alessandro — 259187 — Lt., Royal Italian Army, "Marche" Div. 56 Div., Stolac (Yugoslavia) 4.41-9.42 — Murder — Yugoslavia
- PITARRELLO Romoaldo — 259186 — Lt., Royal Italian Army, Marche-Div., 56 Regt., Stolac (Yugoslavia) 4.41-9.42 — Murder — Yugoslavia
- PIGNATELLI Antonio — 191065 — Colonel, Royal Italian Army, 55 Regt., "Marche" — Div., Trebinje (Yugoslavia) 20.4.41-8.9.43 — Murder — Yugoslavia
- SERENTINO Pietro — 259098 — Lt., Royal Italian Army, 56 Regt., "Marche" — Div., Stolac (Yugoslavia) 4.41-9.42 — Murder — Yugoslavia
- SPAGNA — 191112 — Capt., 56 Infantry Regiment, 1 Battalion, 1 Coy., Div. "Marche", Mostar (Yugoslavia) 7.42 — Pillage — Yugoslavia
- TADDEO Sergio — 191124 — Lt., 55 Regt. "Marche" Div., Trebinje (Yugoslavia) 20.4.41-8.9.43 — Murder — Yugoslavia
- TAGLIO Pietro — 259185 — Lt., Royal Italian Army 56 Regt. "Marche" — Div., Stolac (Yugoslavia) 4.41-9.42 — Murder — Yugoslavia

=== 36th Infantry Division "Forlì" ===
The names of four men attached to the 36th Infantry Division "Forlì" can be found in the Central Registry of War Criminals and Security Suspects:

- BOTIGLIANI (or MONTIGLIANI); 300190; Capt. or Lt., "Forlì" Div., CC. Larissa 41–43; Murder; Greece
- CAVANO – 300205 – Capt., Forlì-Div., C.C. Larissa 41–43 – Murder – Greece
- DALESSIO – 300212 – Capt. or Lt., "Forlì" Div., C.C. Larissa 41–43 – Murder – Greece
- UGOLINI Renato – 305396 – Commandant, 42 Rgt. Forlì Div., Davlia (Greece) 5.5.43 – Murder – Greece

=== 48th Infantry Division "Taro" ===
The names of four men attached to the 48th Infantry Division "Taro" can be found in the Central Registry of War Criminals and Security Suspects:

- MELINI — 191011 — Major, Royal Italian Army, Div. Taro, Gradjani, Radomir, Montenegro (Yugoslavia) 5.42 — Pillage — Yugoslavia;
- ORIOLI E. — 191046 — Major, Royal Italian Army, Deputy Chief of staff, "Taro" Div., Crna Gora (Yugoslavia) 41 — Murder — Yugoslavia;
- PEDRAZZOLI Gino — 149077 — General, Royal Italian Army, Tarro-Div., Montenegro (Yugoslavia) — Murder — Yugoslavia;
- SPITALERI — 193556 — Major, Royal Italian Army "Tarro" — Div., Budva, Banovina, Zetska (Yugoslavia) 41 — Murder — Yugoslavia

=== 57th Infantry Division "Lombardia" ===
The names of 14 men attached to the 57th Infantry Division "Lombardia" can be found in the Central Registry of War Criminals and Security Suspects:

- ALZETTA — 146104 — Lt., Royal Italian Army, Lombardia-Div., Slovenia Croatia (Yugoslavia) 1943 — Murder — Yugoslavia
- BERANI — 149618 — Lieutenant Army, Lombardia-Div., 73 Regt., 3 Battalion, (Yugoslavia) 1943 — Murder — Yugoslavia
- BESTA Fabio — 149613 — Colonel, Army, Lombardia-Div., 73. Infantry Regiment (Yugoslavia) 43 — Murder — Yugoslavia
- D'ORO — 150890 — Capt., Royal Italian Army, Div. Lombardia, Fuzine (Yugoslavia) 1942 — Murder — Yugoslavia
- FACCIN — 148316 — Colonel, Commander, Army, Infantry Regiment 73, Lombardia-Div., 41-43 — Murder — Yugoslavia
- FERRONI — 148310 — Colonel Commander, Army, 74 Inf. Rgt., "Lombardia" Div. (Yugoslavia) 43 — Murder — Yugoslavia
- FLORENTINI — 148307 — Major, "Lombardia" — Div., 73 Rgt., 3 Battalion (Yugoslavia) — Murder — Yugoslavia
- GALLINI — 147285 — Major, Royal Italian Army, 73 Inf. Rgt. "Lombardia" Div. (Yugoslavia) 43 — Murder — Yugoslavia
- GAROLFO (or GAROFOLO) — 147281 — Lt., Royal Italian Army, Lombardia Div., 73 Rgt., 1 Battalion (Yugoslavia) 43 — Murder — Yugoslavia
- LUZENTE — 145419 — Major, Lombardia Div., 73., Rgt., 1 Battalion, Slovenia Croatia (Yugoslavia) 43 — Murder — Yugoslavia
- PALPINELLI — 179073 — Lt., Royal Italian Army, "Lombardia" Div., 73 Rgt., 3 Battalion, Slovenia Croatia (Yugoslavia) — Murder — Yugoslavia
- PITAU — 149087 — Lieutenant General, Royal Italian Army, "Lombardia" — Div. (Yugoslavia) 43 — Murder — Yugoslavia
- VILIERO — 148388 — Chief, Lt. Colonel, Staff, "Lombardia" — Div., (Yugoslavia) 43 — Murder — Yugoslavia
- ZATTI Vittorio — 144988 — Lieutenant General, Royal Italian Army, Lomardia-Div., Fuzine (Yugoslavia) 1943 — Murder — Yugoslavia

=== 154th Infantry Division "Murge" ===
The names of twelve men attached to the 154th Infantry Division "Murge" can be found in the Central Registry of War Criminals and Security Suspects:

- CANINO Ignacio — 190912 — Commanding Officer Royal Italian Army, 259 Regt. of "Murge" Div., Trebine, Boski, Jubine (Yugoslavia) 43 — Murder — Yugoslavia
- CIRILO Antonio — 190933 — Lieutenant Colonel, Royal Italian Army, 51 Regt. of Murge-Div., Trebinje (Yugoslavia) 42-43 — Murder — Yugoslavia
- MELIS — 145475 — Lt., Lombardia-Div., 23 Regt., 3 Battalion, Slovenia, Croatia (Yugoslavia) 1943 — Murder — Yugoslavia
- MOCCIA Alfonso — 145468 — Major, "Isonzo" — Div., 98 Fascist Legion, 117 Battalion, 1943 — Murder — Yugoslavia
- RAVENI — 148643 — Colonel, Army, "Lombardia" — Div., 57 Artl. Regt., Slovenia, Croatia (Yugoslavia) — Murder — Yugoslavia
- ROCI Viciano — 191080 — Lt., Italy Army, 259 Regt., "Murge" — Div., Trebinje, Ljiubine (Yugoslavia) 42-43 — Murder — Yugoslavia
- ROSETI — 191086 — Lt., Royal Italian Army, Murge Div., 51 Rgt., Trebinje (Yugo) 42-43 — Murder — Yugoslavia
- SAVIOLA Giorgio — 191095 — Lt. Colonel, Royal Italian Army, 51 Rgt. of Murge, Prison, Trebuje Area (Yugo) 42-43 — Murder — Yugoslavia
- SOLDANO Vincenzo — 191111 — Major, 259 Regt., "Murge" — Div., Trebinje Iboski Sume Ljubine Ljubomir (Yugoslavia) 42-43 — Murder — Yugoslavia
- SPOLETI (or SPALATINI) — 191117 — Lt., 51 Regt. of "Murge" — Div., Iboski, Ljubine, Sume (Yugoslavia) 42-43 — Murder — Yugoslavia
- TONETI (or CAPELINI) — 191130 — Capt., Royal Italian Army, 51 Rgt. of "Murge" Div., Trebinje Area, Villages of Iboski, Ljubine, Sume, Ljubomir (Yugoslavia) 42-43 — Murder — Yugoslavia
- VERDI Hugo — 191137 — Colonel, Royal Italian Army, 51 Rgt. of Murge Div., Sibenik (Yugoslavia) 41-43 — Murder — Yugoslavia

=== 158th Infantry Division "Zara" ===
The names of five men attached to the 158th Infantry Division "Zara" can be found in the Central Registry of War Criminals and Security Suspects:

- BADINI Andrea — 255507 — Major, 291. Infantry Regiment Zara Div., Kistanje (Yugoslavia) 42 — Brutality — Yugoslavia
- DAMIANI DE VERGADA Pietro (circa '13) — 259168 — Cmdt., 291 Regt. of the Zara Div., Kistanje, Piramatovci, Banja (Yugoslavia) 17.8.42, 3.43, 22.4.43 — Misc. Crimes — Yugoslavia
- FLAVONI Giulio — 255135 — Major, Army, Zara-Div., 291 Rgt., Kistanje (Yugoslavia) 42 — Brutality — Yugoslavia
- SENATORE Aldo — 191101 — Major, Royal Italian Army, Commander of Inf. Div. Zara, Sibenik (Yugoslavia) 41-43 — Murder — Yugoslavia
- VIALE Carlo — 191138 — General, Royal Italian Army, Com. of "Zara" — Div., Sibenik (Yugoslavia) 41-43 — Murder — Yugoslavia
