= 13th Infantry Regiment "Pinerolo" =

Active Italian Army infantry unit

- 13° Reggimento Fanteria "Pinerolo"
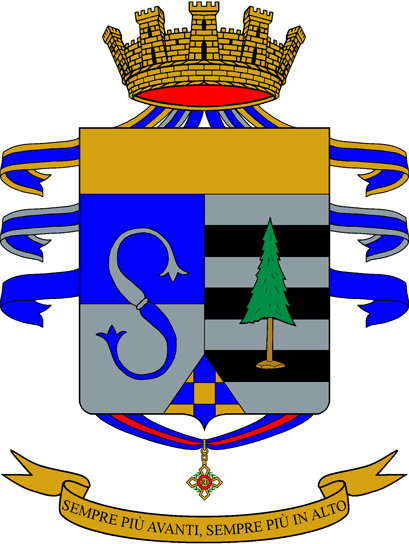
- Regimental coat of arms
- Active: 1672 – 9 Dec. 1798; July 1814 – 31 May 1821; 19 Dec. 1821 – 11 Sept. 1943; 1 May 1952 – 30 April 1955; 25 July – 7 Sept. 1955; 1 Nov. 1975 – 31 Dec. 1990; 1 Oct. 2022 – today
- Country: Italy
- Branch: Italian Army
- Part of: Mechanized Brigade "Pinerolo"
- Garrison/HQ: Bari
- Mottos: "Sempre più avanti, sempre più in alto"
- Anniversaries: 15 June 1918 – Battle of Cima Echar, Costalunga and Valbella
- Decorations: 2× Military Order of Italy; 2× Gold Medals of Military Valor; 2× Silver Medals of Military Valor; 2× Bronze Medals of Military Valor

Insignia
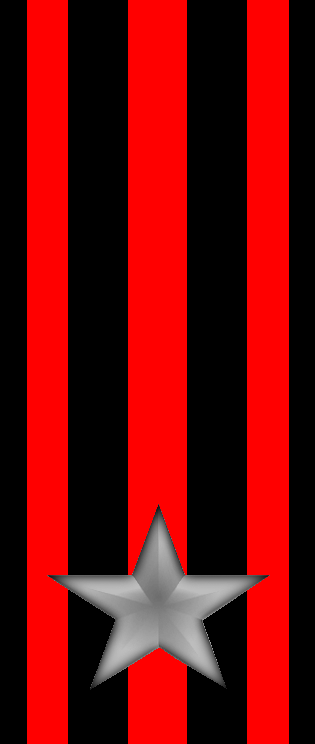
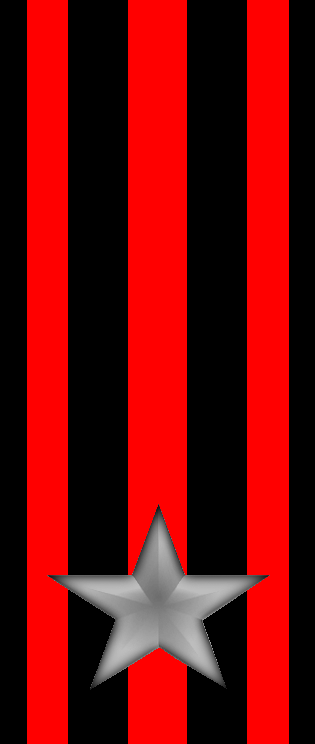
- Regimental gorget patches

The 13th infantry Regiment "Pinerolo" (Italian: 13° Reggimento Fanteria "Pinerolo") is an active unit of the Italian Army based in Bari in Apulia. The regiment is named for the city of Pinerolo and part of the Italian Army's infantry arm. On 1 October 2022, the name, flag and traditions of the regiment were assigned to the Command and Tactical Supports Unit "Pinerolo" of the Mechanized Brigade "Pinerolo". On the same day the unit was renamed 13th Command and Tactical Supports Unit "Pinerolo". The regiment was formed on 19 December 1821 by the Royal Sardinian Army as Brigade of "Pinerolo", with the troops of the Brigade of "Saluzzo", who had remained loyal during the revolt in Piedmont in spring 1821 and were retained in service after the Brigade of "Saluzzo" was disbanded on 31 May 1821. Later the Royal Italian Army allowed the two regiments of the Brigade "Pinerolo" to claim the traditions and honors of the Brigade of "Saluzzo", for which reason the regiment's founding year is today considered to be 1672.

The Regiment Lullino was formed in 1672 and renamed Regiment of "Saluzzo" in 1680. The regiment fought in the Nine Years' War, War of the Spanish Succession, War of the Quadruple Alliance, War of the Polish Succession, and War of the Austrian Succession. In 1792 the regiment fought in the War of the First Coalition against the French Republic. In December 1798, French troops occupied Piedmont, forced King Charles Emmanuel IV into exile, and formed the Piedmontese Republic, a French client-state. Part of the regiment's personnel was then assigned to the 2nd Line Brigade, which fought on the French side in the War of the Second Coalition against the Austrians. In May 1814 King Victor Emmanuel I returned from exile in Sardinia and in July of the same year the Regiment of "Saluzzo" was reformed. One year later the 15 militia regiments of the Kingdom of Sardinia were disbanded and their battalions assigned as reserve units to the army's regular regiments. Consequently, on 1 November 1815, the Regiment of "Saluzzo" was renamed Brigade of "Saluzzo".

In March 1821 most of the brigade's personnel participated, with the troops of three other infantry brigades and three cavalry regiments, in a revolt against King Victor Emmanuel I, who abdicated in favor of his brother Charles Felix. After the revolt Charles Felix had the four infantry brigades and three cavalry regiments disbanded. The troops of the Brigade of "Saluzzo", who had remained loyal during the revolt, were used to form the new Brigade of "Pinerolo" on 19 December 1821. On the same date, the personnel of the other three brigades, which had remained loyal, was used to form the new brigades "Casale", "Savona", and "Acqui". The seniority of the four new brigades was determined by drawing lots.

In 1831, the brigade was renamed Brigade "Pinerolo" and split into two regiments, which in 1839 were designated 13th Infantry Regiment (Brigade "Pinerolo") and 14th Infantry Regiment (Brigade "Pinerolo"). In 1848–49, the regiment participated in the First Italian War of Independence, and in 1855–56 four of the regiment's companies fought in the Crimean War. In 1859, the regiment participated in the Second Italian War of Independence and in 1866 in the Third Italian War of Independence. During World War I, the regiment fought on the Italian front, where the regiment distinguished itself in the Second Battle of the Piave River and was awarded Italy's highest military honor the Gold Medal of Military Valor. In 1934, the regiment was assigned to the 24th Infantry Division "Gran Sasso", with which it fought in 1935–36 in the Second Italo-Ethiopian War. During World War II, the regiment was assigned to the 24th Infantry Division "Pinerolo". In 1940–41, the "Pinerolo" division fought in the Greco-Italian War, during which the regiment distinguished itself and was awarded its second Gold Medal of Military Valor. Afterwards the "Pinerolo" division was sent to Thessaly in Greece on anti-partisan duty. After the announcement of the Armistice of Cassibile on 8 September 1943, the "Pinerolo" division refused German demands to surrender and fought German forces in the area. However on 11 September 1943, most of the "Pinerolo" division was overcome by German forces, which disbanded the division and its regiments.

In 1952, the regiment was reformed in Barletta and assigned to the Infantry Division "Pinerolo". In 1955, the regiment was disbanded. In 1975, the regiment's flag and traditions were assigned to the 13th Motorized Infantry Battalion "Valbella", which was assigned to the Motorized Brigade "Pinerolo". In 1982, the battalion was mechanized and renamed 13th Mechanized Infantry Battalion "Valbella". At the end of 1990, the battalion was reduced to a reserve unit and the flag of the 13th Infantry Regiment "Pinerolo" transferred to the Shrine of the Flags in the Vittoriano in Rome. The regiment's anniversary falls on 15 June 1918, the first day of the Second Battle of the Piave River, during which the Brigade "Pinerolo" distinguished itself, for which the brigade's two regiments were both awarded a Gold Medal of Military Valor.

== History ==
=== Cabinet Wars ===
In 1672, the Regiment Lullino was formed with personnel recruited in the Duchy of Savoy. The regiment was named after its first owner and commander Colonel Marquis Alberto di Lullino di Genève. In 1676, the regiment passed to the Marquis of Bagnasco and was renamed Regiment Bagnasco, and by 1678 the regiment was owned by the Count of Masino, who renamed it Regiment Masino. In 1680, Duke Victor Amadeus II took the regiment into national service and the regiment was renamed Regiment of "Saluzzo" for his dominion the Marquisate of Saluzzo.

Between 1690 and 1697 the regiment participated in the Nine Years' War against the Kingdom of France. The regiment fought in 1690 in the Battle of Staffarda, in 1691 in the Defense of Cuneo, and in 1693 in the Siege of Pinerolo and the Battle of Marsaglia. In 1701, Duke Victor Amadeus II joined the War of the Spanish Succession and the regiment fought in 1702 in the Battle of Luzzara and then in 1706 in the Defense of Turin. In 1713, the war ended with the Peace of Utrecht, which transferred the Kingdom of Sicily and parts of the Duchy of Milan to Savoy. In October 1713 Victor Amadeus II and his wife, Anne Marie d'Orléans, travelled from Nice to Palermo, where on 24 December 1713 they were crowned in the cathedral of Palermo King and Queen of Sicily.

In July 1718, the Kingdom of Spain landed troops on Sicily and tried to recover the Kingdom of Sicily from Savoy rule. On 2 August 1718, Britain, France, Austria, and the Dutch Republic formed an alliance to defeat Spain in the War of the Quadruple Alliance, during which the Regiment of "Saluzzo" served in Sicily. The war ended with the 1720 Treaty of The Hague, which restored the position prior to 1717, but with Savoy and Austria exchanging Sardinia and Sicily. In 1733, King Charles Emmanuel III joined the War of the Polish Succession on the French-Spanish side. In 1734, the regiment fought in the Battle of San Pietro and the Battle of Guastalla against Austrian forces. In 1742, King Charles Emmanuel III joined the War of the Austrian Succession on the Austrian side and the Regiment of "Saluzzo" fought in 1743 in the First Battle of Casteldelfino, in 1744 in the Siege of Villafranca and the Battle of Madonna dell'Olmo.

=== French Revolutionary Wars ===
On 21 September 1792, French forces invaded the Duchy of Savoy and on 29 September the County of Nice. Due to these unprovoked attacks King Victor Amadeus III joined the War of the First Coalition against the French Republic. On 12 June 1793, the Regiment of "Saluzzo" fought in the Battle of Authion. In March 1796, Napoleon Bonaparte arrived in Italy and took command of the French forces, with which he defeated the Royal Sardinian Army in the Montenotte campaign within a month. On 28 April 1796, King Victor Amadeus III had to sign the Armistice of Cherasco and on 15 May 1796 the Treaty of Paris, which forced Sardinia out of the First Coalition.

In fall of 1798, France invaded the remaining territories of King Charles Emmanuel IV. On 6 December 1798, French forces occupied Turin and on 8 December 1798 Charles Emmanuel IV was forced to sign a document of abdication, which also ordered his former subjects to recognise French laws and his troops to obey the orders of the French Army. Charles Emmanuel IV went into exile on Sardinia, while his former territories became the Piedmontese Republic. On 9 December 1798, the Sardinian troops were released from their oath of allegiance to the King and sworn to the Piedmontese Republic. Part of the personnel of the Regiment of "Saluzzo" choose to remain in service and were assigned to the 2nd Line Brigade, which fought on the French side in the War of the Second Coalition against the Austrians. On 5 April 1799, the Austrians won the Battle of Magnano and the French were forced out of Italy. With the French retreat the Piedmontese Republic dissolved and all of the republic's regiments were disbanded in May 1799.

=== Restoration ===
On 6 April 1814, Emperor Napoleon abdicated and on 11 April the winners of the War of the Sixth Coalition exiled him to the island of Elba. On 20 May 1814, King Victor Emmanuel I returned from exile in Sardinia to Turin. On 24 May 1814, Victor Emmanuel I ordered to reform the regiments disbanded in 1799, including the Regiment of "Saluzzo". Each regiment consisted of a staff, and two battalions, both of which fielded one grenadier company, four fusilier companies, and one Jäger company. On 27 June 1814, King Victor Emmanuel I ordered that the 15 provincial militia regiments should be reformed with the same organization as the regular regiments. On 26 February 1815, Napoleon escaped from Elba and landed on 1 March 1815 in Golfe-Juan in France. This triggered the War of the Seventh Coalition, which Sardinia joined against France. The 1st Battalion of the Regiment of "Saluzzo", together with the first battalions of all other Sardinian regiments, fought in the Hundred Days campaign, while the regiment's 2nd Battalion, together with the second battalions of all other Sardinian regiments, remained in Piedmont on garrison duty. During the Hundred Days campaign the 1st Battalion fought on 6 July 1815 at Grenoble.

In October 1815, the provincial regiments were disbanded and their battalions assigned to the regular regiments as reserve battalions. The Regiment of "Saluzzo" received the 1st Battalion of the Provincial Regiment of "Susa" and both battalions of the Provincial Regiment of "Pinerolo". Consequently, on 1 November 1815, the regiment was renamed Brigade of "Saluzzo". Each brigade consisted of two battalions in peacetime and four reserve battalions, which would be mobilized in wartime. The battalions had a strength of 789 men and consisted of a staff, a grenadier company, and six fusilier companies. At the same time the battalion's Jäger companies were used to form independent light infantry battalions. The brigade's peacetime organizations was then as follows.

- Brigade of "Saluzzo"
  - Regimental Staff
  - 1st Battalion
    - 1st Grenadier Company
    - 1st Division, consisting of the 1st and 3rd fusilier companies
    - 2nd Division, consisting of the 5th and 7th fusilier companies
    - 3rd Division, consisting of the 9th and 11th fusilier companies
  - 2nd Battalion
    - 2nd Grenadier Company
    - 1st Division, consisting of the 2nd and 4th fusilier companies
    - 2nd Division, consisting of the 6th and 8th fusilier companies
    - 3rd Division, consisting of the 10th and 12th fusilier companies

The brigade was assigned the provinces of Pinerolo and Susa as recruiting zone. On 9 October 1819, King Victor Emmanuel I ordered a reduction in the number of troops per battalion to 600 men, while adding two additional reserve battalions to each regiment.

=== Revolt of 1821 ===
After returning from exile King Victor Emmanuel I abolished all the freedoms granted by the Napoleonic Code and established a fiercely oppressive rule. The widespread resentment of this kind of rule led in March 1821 to a liberal revolt in Piedmont. Four infantry brigades (Brigade of "Monferrato", Brigade of "Saluzzo", Brigade of "Alessandria", Brigade of "Genova") and three cavalry regiments (Regiment "Dragoni del Re", Regiment "Dragoni della Regina", Regiment "Cavalleggeri del Re") sided with the revolutionaries against Victor Emmanuel I, who, on 13 March 1821, abdicated in favor of his brother Charles Felix. Charles Felix asked for Austrian troops to help suppress the revolt. On 8 April 1815, the rebellious units were dispersed by a joint Austro-Sardinian army near Novara.

On 31 May 1821, the four infantry brigades, which had sided with the revolutionaries, were stricken from the rolls of the Royal Sardinian Army and their personnel dismissed from service, while the troops of the stricken brigades, who had not participated in the revolt, were assigned to four provisional line battalions. The troops of the Brigade of "Saluzzo", who remained in service, were assigned to the 2nd Provisional Line Battalion, while the remaining troops of the Brigade of "Monferrato" were assigned to the 1st Provisional Line Battalion, the troops of the Brigade of "Alessandria" to the 3rd Provisional Line Battalion, and the troops of the Brigade of "Genova" to the 4th Provisional Line Battalion. On 19 December 1821, the four provisional line battalions were used to form four new infantry brigades:

- Brigade of "Casale": formed with the 1st Provisional Line Battalion and the Italian Jäger Battalion
- Brigade of "Pinerolo": formed with the 2nd Provisional Line Battalion and the 2nd Battalion of the Royal Light Legion
- Brigade of "Acqui": formed with the 3rd Provisional Line Battalion and the 3rd Battalion of the Royal Light Legion
- Brigade of "Savona": formed with the 4th Provisional Line Battalion and a battalion of new recruits

The order of precedence of the battalions within the brigades, as well as the seniority and thus the order of precedence of the four new brigades, was determined by drawing lots. The result ranked the Brigade of "Casale" as the oldest, the Brigade of "Pinerolo" as the second oldest, the Brigade of "Savona" as the third oldest, and the Brigade of "Acqui" as the youngest of the new brigades.

=== Reforms of 1830, 1831, and 1839 ===
On 1 December 1830, the Royal Sardinian Army's infantry brigades were reorganized. Each brigade consisted afterwards of a staff and five battalions: a grenadier battalion with four grenadier companies, two fusilier battalions with six fusilier companies per battalion, a Jäger battalion with four Jäger companies, and a depot battalion with six fusilier companies. The latter six fusilier companies consisted in peacetime only of training personnel, which in wartime would have trained the recruits destined to reinforce the brigade's fusilier battalions. Each brigade consisted in peacetime of 105 officers and 2,990 enlisted, which would have increased to 4,069 troops in wartime.

On 25 October 1831, the Royal Sardinian Army's infantry brigades were reorganized once more: each brigade added two regimental commands, which were numbered 1st Regiment and 2nd Regiment. Each regiment consisted of two battalions in peacetime and three battalions in wartime. Each battalion consisted of four fusilier companies, a grenadier company, and a Jäger company. The Brigade "Pinerolo" then consisted of the 1st Regiment (Brigade "Pinerolo") and 2nd Regiment (Brigade "Pinerolo"). On 9 June 1832, the regiment's third battalions were reorganized as depot battalions. On 4 May 1839, the regiments were renamed infantry regiment and renumbered by seniority from 1 to 18. The two regiments of the Brigade "Pinerolo" were now designated 13th Infantry Regiment (Brigade "Pinerolo") and 14th Infantry Regiment (Brigade "Pinerolo"). Each regiment consisted of the I and II battalions with one grenadier company and three fusilier companies per battalion, the III Battalion with four Jäger companies, and the IV Battalion, which was a depot battalion with four fusilier companies.

=== First Italian War of Independence ===
In 1848–49, the 13th Infantry Regiment (Brigade "Pinerolo") participated in the First Italian War of Independence, fighting in 1848 in the Siege of Peschiera, the Battle of Custoza, and the Defense of Milan. For its conduct during the siege and capture of Peschiera the 13th Infantry Regiment was awarded a Bronze Medal of Military Valor. Likewise, the regiment's I Battalion was awarded a Bronze Medal of Military Valor for its conduct at the siege of Peschiera, during the Battle of Custoza, and for its bravery on 4 August 1848 at the defense of Milan. Both medals were affixed to the regiment's flag.

In 1849, the regiment fought in the Battle of Novara. On 23 March 1849, after being defeated in the Battle of Novara, King Charles Albert abdicated in favour of his son Victor Emmanuel. On 24 March, the new king met with the Austrian Field Marshal Radetzky at Vignale and agreed to an armistice, which ended the First Italian War of Independence. For its conduct in the Battle of Novara the 13th Infantry Regiment was awarded a Silver Medal of Military Valor, which was also affixed to the regiment's flag. On 12 October 1849, the Royal Sardinian Army's 18 infantry regiments were reorganized and then consisted of a staff and three battalions of four fusilier companies per battalion. In April 1850, each regiment added a fourth battalion with four fusilier companies.

In 1855, the first company of each of the regiment's four battalions, namely the 1st, 5th, 9th and 13th Company, were assigned to the 3rd Battalion of the 3rd Provisional Regiment, which was part of the Sardinian Expeditionary Corps in the Crimean War. In Crimea the battalion fought in the Siege of Sevastopol.

=== Second Italian War of Independence ===
In 1859, the 13th Infantry Regiment (Brigade "Pinerolo") participated in the Second Italian War of Independence, fighting in the Battle of Vinzaglio, the Battle of Solferino, and then the Siege of Peschiera. For its conduct on 24 June 1859 in the Battle of Solferino the regiment was awarded a Silver Medal of Military Valor, which was affixed to the regiment's flag. In fall 1859, the armies of the Second French Empire and the Kingdom of Sardinia occupied Lombard part of the Kingdom of Lombardy–Venetia, as well as the Duchy of Modena and Reggio, the Duchy of Parma and Piacenza, and the Papal Legations of the Romagne. On 1 November 1859, the Royal Sardinian Army formed eight new infantry regiments to garrison the occupied territories. Each existing infantry regiment, with the exception of the 1st Infantry Regiment and 2nd Infantry Regiment of the Brigade "Re", ceded its III Battalion and three depot companies, to help form the new infantry regiments. Consequently, on 1 November 1859, the 13th Infantry Regiment and 14th Infantry Regiment of the Brigade "Pinerolo" ceded their III Battalion and three depot companies to form the 24th Infantry Regiment, which on the same day was assigned to the newly formed Brigade "Como".

On 1 March 1860, the 13th Infantry Regiment ceded two companies to help form the 27th Infantry Regiment (Brigade "Pavia"), while the 14th Infantry Regiment ceded two companies to help form the 28th Infantry Regiment (Brigade "Pavia"). On 5 May 1860, Giuseppe Garibaldi's Expedition of the Thousand set off, with the support of the Sardinian government, from Genoa and landed on 11 May in Marsala in Sicily. On 15 May 1860, Garibaldi won the Battle of Calatafimi and the Sardinian government decided to send reinforcements to Sicily. This triggered the Sardinian campaign in central and southern Italy. After the successful conclusion of Garibaldi's Expedition of the Thousand the Kingdom of Sardinia annexed the Kingdom of the Two Sicilies and most of the Papal Legations. On 17 March 1861, King Victor Emmanuel II proclaimed himself King of Italy.

=== Third Italian War of Independence ===
On 16 April 1861, the 13th Infantry Regiment and 14th Infantry Regiment ceded both one battalion to help form the 58th Infantry Regiment (Brigade "Abruzzi"). On 1 August 1862, the 13th Infantry Regiment and 14th Infantry Regiment ceded both their 17th Company and 18th Company to help form the 71st Infantry Regiment (Brigade "Puglie"). The 14th Infantry Regiment also ceded one of its depot companies to help form the 68th Infantry Regiment (Brigade "Palermo"). In 1866, the Brigade "Pinerolo" participated in the Third Italian War of Independence.

On 25 October 1871, the brigade level was abolished, and the two regiments of the Brigade "Pinerolo" were renamed 13th Infantry Regiment "Pinerolo", respectively 14th Infantry Regiment "Pinerolo". On 2 January 1881, the brigade level was reintroduced, and the two regiments were renamed again as 13th Infantry Regiment (Brigade "Pinerolo") and 14th Infantry Regiment (Brigade "Pinerolo"). On 1 November 1884, the 13th Infantry Regiment ceded some of its companies to help form the 85th Infantry Regiment (Brigade "Verona"), while the 14th Infantry Regiment ceded some of its companies to help form the 86th Infantry Regiment (Brigade "Verona"). In 1887–88, the regiment's 2nd Company deployed to Massawa for the Italo-Ethiopian War of 1887–1889, which led to the establishment of the Italian colony of Eritrea. In 1895–96, the regiment provided eight officers and 190 enlisted for units deployed to Italian Eritrea for the First Italo-Ethiopian War. In 1911–12, the regiment provided volunteers for units deployed to Libya for the Italo-Turkish War.

=== World War I ===
At the outbreak of World War I, the Brigade "Pinerolo" formed, together with the Brigade "Acqui" and the 18th Field Artillery Regiment, the 14th Division. At the time the 13th Infantry Regiment consisted of three battalions, each of which fielded four fusilier companies and one machine gun section. On 1 March 1915, the depot of the 18th Infantry Regiment (Brigade "Acqui") in Chieti formed the command of the Brigade "Chieti" and the 123rd Infantry Regiment for the new brigade, while the depot of the 13th Infantry Regiment in L'Aquila formed the 124th Infantry Regiment for the new brigade. On the same date, the depot of the 14th Infantry Regiment in Foggia formed the 137th Infantry Regiment for the newly formed Brigade "Barletta". On 24 May 1915, the day after Italy's entry into the war, the Brigade "Pinerolo" was deployed in Villesse on the lower Isonzo river, which the Italian forces crossed in the first days of June. The brigade then advanced to Selz at the foot of the Karst plateau, which blocked the way to the city of Trieste. For the rest of the year the Brigade "Pinerolo" participated in the Italian attempts to dislodge the Austro-Hungarian forces from the slopes and hills of the Karst plateau. From 23 June to 7 July 1915, during the First Battle of the Isonzo, the brigade attacked towards Monte Sei Busi. Between 18 July and 3 August 1915, during the Second Battle of the Isonzo, the brigade renewed the attack against Monte Sei Busi. During the Third Battle of the Isonzo, from 18 October to 3 November 1915, the brigade attacked the enemy trenches above Selz and for a third time was beaten back. The three unsuccessful attacks cost the brigade more than 4,000 casualties and therefore the brigade was pulled back for a rest in Aquileia.

In June and July 1916, the brigade undertook a series of attacks against enemy positions along the edge of the Karst plateau to occupy Austro-Hungarian forces in the area, while Italian troops battled to stop the Austro-Hungarian Asiago offensive on the Asiago plateau. During these attacks the I Battalion of the 13th Infantry Regiment, together with the II Battalion of the 123rd Infantry Regiment (Brigade "Chieti"), managed to conquer a foothold atop the Karst plateau overlooking the valley of Doberdò. The unplanned advance had cost the brigade more than 2,200 casualties. During the Sixth Battle of the Isonzo the brigade remained in reserve, while Italian forces finally conquered the positions on the Karst plateau. On 14 August, the brigade entered the line on the Karst plateau and attacked the new Austro-Hungarian line between Pečinka and Veliki Hribach. In three days the brigade lost almost 2,000 men and had to be sent to Romans d'Isonzo in the rear to be rebuilt. The brigade then returned to the Karst plateau for the Seventh Battle of the Isonzo, during which the 14th Infantry Regiment attacked without success the Nad Logem on 16 and 17 September, for the Eighth Battle of the Isonzo, during which the II and III battalions of the 13th Infantry Regiment attacked with little success Veliki Hribach, and for the Ninth Battle of the Isonzo, during which the brigade attacked North of the Veliki Hribach and managed to take the summit of the Volkovnjak. At the end of December 1916, the brigade was sent to Sdraussina in the rear for a rest.

On 6 February 1917, the depot of the 17th Infantry Regiment (Brigade "Acqui") in Ascoli Piceno formed the command of the Brigade "Piceno" and the 235th Infantry Regiment for the new brigade, while the depot of the 13th Infantry Regiment in L'Aquila formed the 236th Infantry Regiment for the new brigade. In May 1917, during the Tenth Battle of the Isonzo, the Brigade "Pinerolo" operated on the Karst plateau in the area of Sela na Krasu, but without success and at the cost of almost 2,500 casualties. On 4 June 1917, the 164th Infantry Regiment was formed with the replacement battalions of the 1st Infantry Regiment (Brigade "Re"), 10th Infantry Regiment (Brigade "Regina") and 13th Infantry Regiment. From 4 June to 20 July the new regiment served with the Brigade "Trapani", before it was assigned on 20 July to the newly formed Brigade "Lucca". During the Eleventh Battle of the Isonzo the Brigade "Pinerolo" attacked the Austro-Hungarian positions at Kostanjevica na Krasu on the Karst plateau. During that battle the brigade attacked enemy positions on 19 and 21 August, but after suffering more than 1,500 casualties refrained from further attacks against the strong enemy positions in the area.

On 24 October 1917, Austro-Hungarian forces, reinforced by German units, commenced the Battle of Caporetto. The German forces were able to break into the Italian front line at Caporetto and rout the Italian forces opposing them, which forced the Italian armies along the Isonzo river and in the Julian Alps to retreat behind the Piave river. On 27 October the Brigade "Pinerolo" was ordered to retreat to Villesse and form the Italian rear guard. On 29 October the brigade crossed the lower Cormor and the next day fought a rearguard action at Palazzolo dello Stella. While crossing the Monticano river the command and most of the I Battalion of the 14th Infantry Regiment were cut off by enemy forces and captured. On 10 November, the remnants of the brigade reached San Biagio di Callalta on the right bank of the Piave river. On 13 and 14 November the remaining troops of the brigade participated in the attempt to destroy the Austro-Hungarian bridgehead at Zenson di Piave. On 28 December, the brigade, which had suffered more than 2,100 casualties in the retreat, was taken out of the line and sent to the rear.

In April 1918, the brigade was sent to the Asiago plateau, where it manned the line between the summits of Cima Ekar and Monte Valbella. On 15 June 1918, Austro-Hungarian forces began the Second Battle of the Piave River. On the first day of the battle Austro-Hungarian troops conquered the summit of Monte Valbella and then encircled the strong point at Malga Costalunga, which was held by the II Battalion of the 14th Infantry Regiment. By evening the II Battalion was forced to surrender and the Austro-Hungarians shifted their attacks to the summit of Cima Ekar and Monte Melago. Counterattacks by the III Battalion of the 13th Infantry Regiment at Cima Ekar and the III Battalion of the 14th Infantry Regiment further East stopped the Austro-Hungarian advance. On 19 June, the I and II battalions of the 13th Infantry Regiment attacked and managed to retake the strong point at Malga Costalunga. In October 1918, during the decisive Battle of Vittorio Veneto, the brigade attacked the Austro-Hungarian positions on the Asiago plateau and then pursued the retreating enemy to Cima Vezzana and Cima Larici.

For their conduct on the Karst plateau and during the Second Battle of the Piave River both regiments of the Brigade "Pinerolo" were awarded Italy's highest military honor, the Gold Medal of Military Valor. The two medals were affixed to the two regiments' flags and added to their coat of arms.

=== Interwar years ===
On 30 September 1926, the command of the Brigade "Arezzo" and the 226th Infantry Regiment were disbanded. On the same date the brigade's 225th Infantry Regiment was renamed 225th Infantry Regiment "Arezzo" and assigned to the Brigade "Pinerolo". On 10 November 1926, the Brigade "Pinerolo" was renamed XXIV Infantry Brigade and its two original infantry regiments were renamed 13th Infantry Regiment "Pinerolo" and 14th Infantry Regiment "Pinerolo". The XXIV Infantry Brigade was the infantry component of the 24th Territorial Division of Chieti, which also included the 18th Field Artillery Regiment. In 1934, the 24th Territorial Division of Chieti changed its name to 24th Infantry Division "Gran Sasso". The same year the 13th Infantry Regiment "Pinerolo" became an infantry school regiment and incorporated the Non-Commissioned Officer Recruits School in Rieti as its II Battalion.

=== Second Italo-Ethiopian War ===
On 30 May 1935, the depot of the 225th Infantry Regiment "Arezzo" in Ascoli Piceno reformed the 97th Infantry Regiment "Genova", as replacement for the 225th Infantry Regiment "Arezzo", which, along with the rest of the 24th Infantry Division "Gran Sasso", was mobilized for the Second Italo-Ethiopian War. On 1 June 1935, the depot of the 14th Infantry Regiment "Pinerolo" in Chieti reformed the 96th Infantry Regiment "Udine", while the depot of the 18th Artillery Regiment in L'Aquila reformed the 44th Artillery Regiment. On 1 July 1935, the 95th Infantry School Regiment "Udine" was reformed in Rieti and then moved to L'Aquila, where it took over the base of the 13th Infantry Regiment "Pinerolo". The three reformed infantry regiments were assigned to the CXXIV Infantry Brigade, which was the infantry component of the 124th Infantry Division "Gran Sasso II".

On 3 October 1935, Italian forces invaded Ethiopia and the war began. Together with the 19th Infantry Division "Gavinana" the 24th Infantry Division "Gran Sasso" operated in the Tigray Region and fought in March 1936 in the Battle of Shire. In September 1936, the "Gran Sasso" division was repatriated. For their service in Ethiopia between 3 October 1935 and 5 May 1936, the division's infantry regiments were awarded, like all infantry units, which had participated in the war, a Military Order of Italy, which was affixed to the regiments' flags. On 15 September 1936, the 124th Infantry Division "Gran Sasso II" and its regiments were disbanded and the personnel of the disbanded units was assigned to the regiments of the 24th Infantry Division "Gran Sasso". Afterwards the 13th Infantry Regiment "Pinerolo" resumed its duties as infantry school regiment.

On 1 March 1937, the 225th Infantry Regiment "Arezzo" was transferred to the newly formed 63rd Infantry Division "Cirene", which was based in Libya. Consequently, the 225th Infantry Regiment "Arezzo" moved to Marj in Libya. On 1 March 1938, the 225th Infantry Regiment "Arezzo" was renamed 158th Infantry Regiment "Liguria" and on the same day the 225th Infantry Regiment "Arezzo" was reformed in Ascoli Piceno and once more assigned to the XXIV Infantry Brigade. On 24 May 1939, the 225th Infantry Regiment "Arezzo" was transferred to the newly formed 53rd Infantry Division "Arezzo". On the same day, the XXIV Infantry Brigade was disbanded and the 13th Infantry Regiment "Pinerolo" and 14th Infantry Regiment "Pinerolo" came under direct command of the division, which was renamed 24th Infantry Division "Pinerolo". Also on the same date the 18th Field Artillery Regiment was renamed 18th Artillery Regiment "Pinerolo".

=== World War II ===
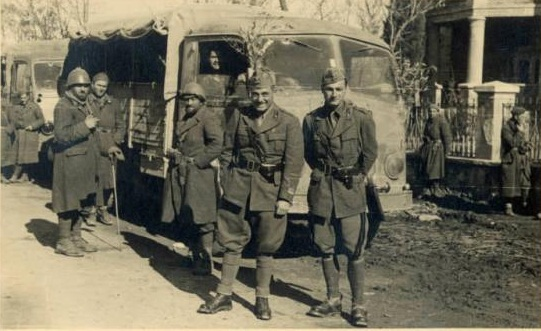
18th Artillery Regiment "Pinerolo" troops entering Ohrid in Yugoslavia on 12 April 1941

At the outbreak of World War II, the 13th Infantry Regiment "Pinerolo" consisted of a command, a command company, three fusilier battalions, a support weapons battery equipped with 65/17 infantry support guns, and a mortar company equipped with 81mm Mod. 35 mortars. In June 1940, the "Pinerolo" division was assigned to the reserve of the I Army Corps during the Italian invasion of France. In January 1941, the "Pinerolo" division was sent to Albania to reinforce the crumbling Italian front during the Greek offensive in the Greco-Italian War. On 18 January 1941, the division arrived in Berat and entered the front near Këlcyrë. Over the next month, the division fought defensive battles, which culminated in the defense of Tepelenë. On 9 March 1941, the division participated in the Italian Spring Offensive and advanced after strenuous combat to Çarshovë on the Greek-Albanian border. On 6 April 1941, the Axis forces invaded Yugoslavia. On 8 April 1941, the "Pinerolo" division crossed the Albanian-Yugoslav border near Lake Ohrid and took the city of Ohrid in Macedonia. On 9 April the division arrived in Prrenjas. For its conduct and bravery during the Greco-Italian War the 13th Infantry Regiment "Pinerolo" was awarded its second Gold Medal of Military Valor, which was affixed to the regiment's flag and added to its coat of arms. At the same time, the 14th Infantry Regiment "Pinerolo" was awarded a Silver Medal of Military Valor for its conduct in the campaign.

In June 1941, the division was transferred to Larissa in Thessaly in Greece to suppress the growing Greek Resistance. On 1 November 1941, the depot of the 50th Infantry Regiment "Parma" in Macerata reformed the 313th Infantry Regiment "Pinerolo", which joined the "Pinerolo" division in Greece in March 1942. The preceding 313th Infantry Regiment had been formed on 21 April 1920 in Constantinople with the command of the 62nd Infantry Regiment (Brigade "Sicilia") and that regiment's III Battalion, as well as a battalion of the disbanded 136th Infantry Regiment (Brigade "Campania"), which had been sent, along with French and English troops, to occupy Constantinople. On 1 October 1923, the 313th Infantry Regiment was ordered to leave Constantinople and, after arriving in Taranto in Italy, the regiment was disbanded on 15 October 1923.

The "Pinerolo" division remained on anti-partisan duty in Thessaly until the Armistice of Cassibile was announced on 8 September 1943. In the confusion after the armistice the division was the only Italian division in continental Greece to refuse German demands to surrender. On 11 September 1943, the division's regiments were disbanded and on 15 September the division's commander General Adolfo Infante moved with around 8,000 men, which wanted to continue the fight against the Germans, into the Pindus mountain range. Infante then negotiated, with mediation the allied military mission in Greece, a collaboration agreement with the Greek People's Liberation Army (ELAS). However, on 14 October 1943 ELAS forced the remaining "Pinerolo" division troops to surrender their supplies and weapons, and used the Italian soldiers as forced labor for the rest of the war. In March 1945, the survivors of the "Pinerolo" division were repatriated.

=== Cold War ===
On 1 April 1952, the Infantry Division "Pinerolo" was reformed in Bari. On 1 May 1952, the 13th Infantry Regiment "Pinerolo" was reformed in Barletta and assigned to the division, which also included the 9th Infantry Regiment "Bari" and 14th Field Artillery Regiment. At the time the 13th Infantry Regiment "Pinerolo" consisted of the following units:

- 13th Infantry Regiment "Pinerolo", in Barletta
  - Command Company
  - I Battalion
  - II Battalion
  - Mortar Company, with 107mm M30 mortars
  - Anti-tank Cannons Company, with QF 6-pounder anti-tank guns

On 30 April 1955, the regiment was disbanded and its two battalions transferred to the 9th Infantry Regiment "Bari". Between 25 July and 7 September of the same year, the 13th Infantry Regiment "Pinerolo" was reformed with reservists to test the Italian Army's ability to mobilize additional units in case of war. The regiment was assigned to the Infantry Division "Pinerolo" and encamped in Muro Lucano. The regiment consisted of a command, a command company, three fusilier battalions, and a mortar company with M30 mortars.

During the 1975 army reform the army disbanded the regimental level and newly independent battalions were granted for the first time their own flags. On 31 October 1975, the 9th Infantry Regiment "Bari" was disbanded. The next day the regiment's IV Mechanized Battalion in Avellino became an autonomous unit and was renamed 13th Motorized Infantry Battalion "Valbella". The battalion was named for Monte Valbella on the Asiago plateau, on whose summit the 13th Infantry Regiment "Pinerolo" had distinguished itself during the Second Battle of the Piave River in June 1918. The battalion was assigned to the Motorized Brigade "Pinerolo" and consisted of a command, a command and services company, three motorized companies, and a heavy mortar company equipped with towed 120mm Mod. 63 mortars. At the time the battalion fielded 844 men (41 officers, 94 non-commissioned officers, and 709 soldiers).

On 12 November 1976, the President of the Italian Republic Giovanni Leone assigned with decree 846 the flag and traditions of the 13th Infantry Regiment "Pinerolo" to the 13th Motorized Infantry Battalion "Valbella".

On 1 February 1979, the Motorized Brigade "Pinerolo" was mechanized and renamed Mechanized Brigade "Pinerolo". Consequently, also the 13th Motorized Infantry Battalion "Valbella" was mechanized. On 1 January 1982, the battalion was renamed 13th Mechanized Infantry Battalion "Valbella" and consisted now of a command, a command and services company, three mechanized companies with M113 armored personnel carriers, and a heavy mortar company with M106 mortar carriers with 120mm Mod. 63 mortars. The battalion fielded now 896 men (45 officers, 100 non-commissioned officers, and 751 soldiers).

=== Recent times ===
With the end of the Cold War the Italian Army began to draw down its forces and on 31 December 1990 the 13th Mechanized Infantry Battalion "Valbella" was reduced to a reserve unit and the flag of the 13th Infantry Regiment "Pinerolo" was transferred to the Shrine of the Flags in the Vittoriano in Rome.

=== Reactivation ===
On 1 October 2022, the name, flag and traditions of the 13th Infantry Regiment "Pinerolo" were assigned to the Command and Tactical Supports Unit "Pinerolo" of the Mechanized Brigade "Pinerolo". On the same day the unit was renamed 13th Command and Tactical Supports Unit "Pinerolo".

== Organization ==
As of 2024 the unit is organized as follows:

- 13th Command and Tactical Supports Unit "Pinerolo", in Bari
  - Command and Logistic Support Company
  - Signal Company

== See also ==
- Mechanized Brigade "Pinerolo"
