= 18th Anti-aircraft Artillery Regiment (Italy) =

Inactive Italian Army air-defense unit

- 8° Reggimento Artiglieria Controaerei
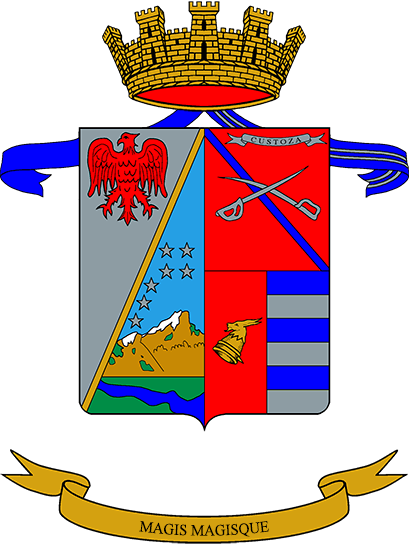
- Regimental coat of arms
- Active: 1 Nov. 1888 — 14 Sept. 1943; 15 March 1947 — 1 July 1951; 1 June 1952 — 18 Nov 1975; 2 May 1976 — 31 March 1981; 18 Sept. 1992 — 30 June 1997
- Country: Italy
- Branch: Italian Army
- Part of: Anti-aircraft Artillery Command
- Garrison/HQ: Rimini
- Motto: "Magis magisque"
- Anniversaries: 15 June 1918 - Second Battle of the Piave River
- Decorations: 1x Bronze Medal of Military Valor; 1x War Cross of Military Valor

Insignia
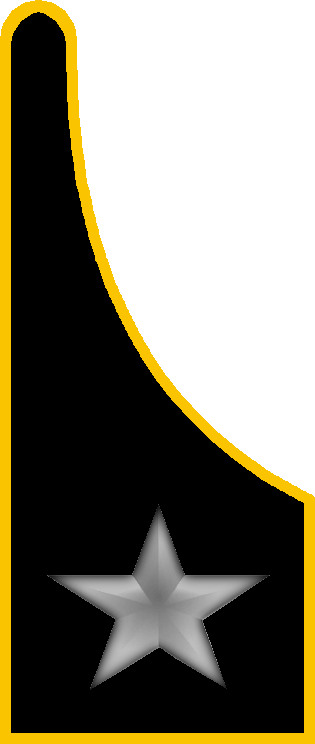
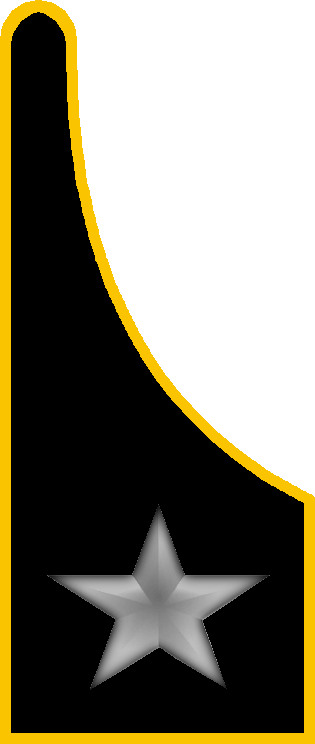
- Regimental gorget patches

The 18th Anti-aircraft Artillery Regiment (Italian: 18° Reggimento Artiglieria Controaerei) is an inactive air defense regiment of the Italian Army, which was based in Rimini in the Emilia Romagna. Originally an artillery regiment of the Royal Italian Army, the regiment was formed in 1888 and served in World War I on the Italian front. In 1935, the regiment was assigned to the 24th Infantry Division "Gran Sasso", which fought in the Second Italo-Ethiopian War. In 1939, the division was renamed 24th Infantry Division "Pinerolo". In World War II the Pinerolo division fought in the Greco-Italian War, after which the division remained in occupied Greece on anti-partisan duty. The division and regiment were located in Thessaly, when the Armistice of Cassibile was announced on 8 September 1943. The division resisted German demands to surrender and moved into the Pindus mountain range, where the division was disarmed by the Greek People's Liberation Army.

In 1947, the Italian Army reformed the regiment and assigned it one year later to the Infantry Division "Mantova". In 1951, the regiment was disbanded and reformed once more in 1952. In 1953, the regiment was reorganized as an anti-aircraft artillery regiment and, on 1 June 1953, the regiment was transferred from the field artillery to the anti-aircraft specialty. In 1975, the regiment was disbanded and its flag and traditions assigned to the 18th Field Artillery Group "Gran Sasso", which was a training formation assigned to the Italian Army's Artillery School. In 1981, the group was disbanded and the regiment's flag transferred to the Shrine of the Flags in the Vittoriano in Rome for safekeeping. In 1992, the regiment was reformed as an anti-aircraft artillery unit. In 1997, the regiment was once more disbanded and its flag returned to the Shrine of the Flags. The regiment's anniversary falls, as for all Italian Army artillery regiments, on June 15, the beginning of the Second Battle of the Piave River in 1918.

== History ==
On 1 November 1888, the Royal Italian Army formed the 18th Field Artillery Regiment in L'Aquila. The new regiment consisted of eight batteries and one train company ceded by the 6th Field Artillery Regiment. The ceded batteries had participated in the Third Italian War of Independence and been awarded a Bronze Medal of Military Valor for their conduct during the Battle of Custoza in 1866.

In 1895-96, the regiment provided one officer and 90 troops for the formation of the 9th Artillery Battery, which was deployed to Eritrea for the First Italo-Ethiopian War. In 1911-12, the regiment provided 16 officers and 363 troops to augment units deployed to Libya for the Italo-Turkish War. On 1 January 1915, the regiment ceded its III Group, which consisted of three batteries, to help form the 31st Field Artillery Regiment.

=== World War I ===
At the outbreak of World War I the regiment was assigned, together with the Brigade "Pinerolo" and Brigade "Acqui", to the 14th Division. At the time the regiment consisted of a command, three groups with a combined eight batteries equipped with 75/27 mod. 06 field guns, two reserve pack batteries with 70/15 mountain guns, and a depot. In May 1915, the regiment formed with its reserve personnel one group of three batteries for the 38th Field Artillery. During the war the regiment's depot formed the XLI Mountain Artillery Group and three siege batteries. In 1915, the regiment fought in June at Ronchi, and then during the First Battle of the Isonzo on the Karst plateau between Sagrado and Monfalcone. From August to October 1915, the regiment was deployed at Doberdò on the Karst plateau. In 1916, the regiment was again at Doberdò and Monfalcone, before being sent to fight on Mount Košnik during the Sixth Battle of the Isonzo. In October and November 1916, the regiment fought in the Ninth Battle of the Isonzo at Doberdò, on Nad Logem, at Nova Vas, on Mount Pečinka, and on Veliki Hribach. In May 1917, during the Tenth Battle of the Isonzo, the regiment was deployed on the Karst plateau at Fajtji hrib and at Hudi Log. The regiment then fought in the following Battle of Flondar. In August and September 1917, the regiment was sent to the Banjšice Plateau for the Eleventh Battle of the Isonzo. After suffering heavy losses during the Italian retreat to the Piave river after the defeat in the Battle of Caporetto, the regiment was taken out of the front to recuperate. On 30 June 1918, the regiment entered the front in the Monte Zugna sector, where it remained until the end of the war.

=== Interwar years ===
In 1926, the regiment was assigned to the 24th Territorial Division of Chieti. At the time the regiment consisted of a command, a group with 100/17 mod. 14 howitzers, two groups with 75/27 mod. 11 field guns, a group with mule-carried 75/13 mod. 15 mountain guns, and a depot. In January 1935, the 24th Territorial Division of Chieti was renamed 24th Infantry Division "Gran Sasso" and consequently, the regiment was renamed 18th Artillery Regiment "Gran Sasso".

In 1935-36, the 24th Infantry Division "Gran Sasso" was mobilized for the Second Italo-Ethiopian War and sent to Eritrea. The 18th Artillery Regiment "Gran Sasso" entered the war with three groups with 75/13 mod. 15 mountain guns, one of which had been ceded by the 13th Artillery Regiment "Granatieri di Sardegna". While the regiment was overseas the regiment's depot in L'Aquila formed on 1 June 1935 the 44th Artillery Regiment, which incorporated the units of the 18th Artillery Regiment "Gran Sasso" that had remained in Italy: the group with 100/17 mod. 14 howitzers, the group with 75/27 mod. 11 field guns, and a newly formed group with 65/17 mod. 13 mountain guns, which were replaced on 15 October 1935 by 75/13 mod. 15 mountain guns.

During the campaign in Ethiopia the 18th Artillery Regiment "Gran Sasso" fought in December 1935 in the Ethiopian Christmas Offensive and in February and March 1936 in the Battle of Shire. In August 1936, the 18th Artillery Regiment "Gran Sasso" returned from overseas and, on 15 September 1936, the 44th Artillery Regiment was disbanded. The next day, the groups of the disbanded regiment were incorporated by the 18th Artillery Regiment "Gran Sasso". But already in May 1937, the 18th Artillery Regiment "Gran Sasso" helped reform the 44th Artillery Regiment by raising the command, the command unit, and a group with 75/27 mod. 06 field guns for the reformed regiment. The 44th Artillery Regiment was then assigned to the 62nd Infantry Division "Marmarica", which was based in Libya. On 1 October of the same year, the 18th Artillery Regiment "Gran Sasso" ceded its II Group with 75/27 mod. 06 field guns to help reform the 45th Artillery Regiment, which was assigned to the 63rd Infantry Division "Cirene" that was also based in Libya.

On 24 May 1939, the 225th Infantry Regiment "Arezzo" was transferred from the 24th Infantry Division "Gran Sasso" to the 53rd Infantry Division "Arezzo". Afterwards, the 24th Infantry Division "Gran Sasso" consisted of the 13th Infantry Regiment "Pinerolo", 14th Infantry Regiment "Pinerolo", and 18th Artillery Regiment "Gran Sasso". Consequently, the division was renamed on the same date 24th Infantry Division "Pinerolo", while the artillery regiment was renamed 18th Field Artillery Regiment "Pinerolo". Furthermore, during the same month the depot of the 18th Field Artillery Regiment "Pinerolo" in L'Aquila reformed the 53rd Artillery Regiment "Arezzo" for the 53rd Infantry Division "Arezzo".

=== World War II ===
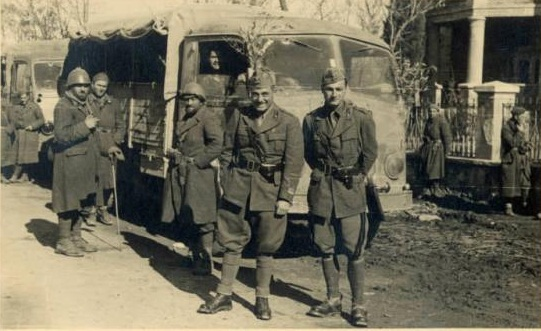
18th Artillery Regiment "Pinerolo" troops entering Ohrid in Yugoslavia on 12 April 1941

On 10 June 1940, the day Italy entered World War II, the regiment consisted of a command, a command unit, a group with 100/17 mod. 14 howitzers, a group with 75/27 mod. 06 field guns, the 324th Anti-aircraft Battery with 20/65 mod. 35 anti-aircraft guns, and a group with 75/13 mod. 15 mountain guns, which was reorganized into a group with 75/27 mod. 06 field guns.

In December 1940, the regiment transferred its two groups with 75/27 mod. 06 field guns to the 32nd Artillery Regiment "Marche" of the 32nd Infantry Division "Marche", respectively the 56th Artillery Regiment "Casale" of the 56th Infantry Division "Casale", and received in turn from the two regiments two groups with 75/13 mod. 15 mountain guns. In January 1941, the 24th Infantry Division "Pinerolo" was sent to Albania to reinforce the crumbling Italian front during the Greek offensive in the Greco-Italian War. On 18 January 1941, the division arrived in Berat and entered the front near Këlcyrë. Over the next month, the division fought defensive battles, which culminated in the defense of Tepelenë. On 9 March 1941, the division participated in the Italian Spring Offensive and advanced after strenuous combat to Çarshovë on the Greek-Albanian border. On 6 April 1941, the Axis forces invaded Yugoslavia. On 8 April 1941, the Pinerolo division crossed the Albanian-Yugoslav border near Lake Ohrid and took the city of Ohrid in Macedonia. On 9 April 1941, the division arrived in Prrenjas. For its conduct in Albania between 1 February and 19 April 1941 the 18th Field Artillery Regiment "Pinerolo" was awarded a War Cross of Military Valor, which was affixed to the regiment's flag.

In June 1941, the Pinerolo division was transferred to Larissa in Thessaly in Greece to suppress the growing Greek Resistance. The Pinerolo division remained on anti-partisan duty in Thessaly until the Armistice of Cassibile was announced on 8 September 1943. In the confusion after the armistice's announcement the division was the only Italian division in continental Greece to refuse German demands to surrender. On 11 September 1943, the division's regiments were disbanded and on 15 September the division's commander General Adolfo Infante moved with around 8,000 men, which wanted to fight the Germans, into the Pindus mountain range. General Infante then negotiated, with mediation the allied military mission in Greece, a collaboration agreement with the Greek People's Liberation Army (ELAS). However, on 14 October 1943 ELAS forced the remaining "Pinerolo" division troops to surrender their supplies and weapons, and used the Italian soldiers as forced labor for the rest of the war. In March 1945, the survivors of the "Pinerolo" division were repatriated.

=== Cold War ===
On 15 March 1947, the Italian Army reformed the regiment as 18th Anti-tank Field Artillery Regiment in Fossano. The regiment consisted of a command, a command unit, two groups with British QF 6-pounder anti-tank guns, and a group with British QF 17-pounder anti-tank guns, which had been ceded by the 155th Field Artillery Regiment. In May 1947, the regiment moved from Fossano to San Marco di Mereto di Tomba, but already in September of the same year the regiment moved to Udine, where it was assigned to the Infantry Division "Mantova". Over the next years the regiment replaced its QF 6-pounder anti-tank guns with British QF 17-pounder anti-tank guns.

On 1 January 1951, the Infantry Division "Mantova" included the following artillery regiments:

- Infantry Division "Mantova", in Gorizia
  - 3rd Field Artillery Regiment, in Gradisca d'Isonzo
  - 5th Field Artillery Regiment, in Palmanova
  - 18th Anti-tank Field Artillery Regiment, in Udine
  - 155th Field Artillery Regiment, in Udine
  - 4th Light Anti-aircraft Artillery Regiment, in Cervignano del Friuli

On 1 July 1951, the 18th Anti-tank Field Artillery Regiment was disbanded and its groups transferred to other regiments: the I and III groups to the 155th Field Artillery Regiment and the II Group to the 184th Field Artillery Regiment.

On 1 June 1952, the regiment was reformed in Rome as 18th Field Artillery Regiment. The regiment consisted of a command, a command unit, the I and II groups with British QF 25-pounder field guns, and the III Group with 40/56 autocannons. Exactly one year later, on 1 June 1953, the regiment was reorganized and renamed 18th Heavy Anti-aircraft Artillery Regiment. Now based in Foligno the regiment consisted of a command, a command unit, the I and II groups with 90/53 anti-aircraft guns, and the V Group with 40/56 autocannons.

On 18 February 1958, the regiment moved from Foligno to Rimini. On 1 April 1956, regiment was equipped with American 90/50 M1 anti-aircraft guns and consisted of a command, a command unit, the I and II heavy anti-aircraft groups with 90/50 M1 anti-aircraft guns, and the IV Light Anti-aircraft Group with 40/56 autocannons. On 10 June of the same year, the IV Light Anti-aircraft Group moved to Ravenna. On 1 August 1959, the regiment added the III Heavy Anti-aircraft Group with 90/50 M1 anti-aircraft guns. On 30 October 1961, the III Heavy Anti-aircraft Group was disbanded and the IV Light Anti-aircraft Group was renumbered as III Group.

On 1 August 1963, the regiment was assigned to the army's Anti-aircraft Artillery Command and, on 1 September of the same year, the regiment was reorganized and renamed 18th Light Anti-aircraft Artillery Regiment. The regiment consisted now of a command, a command unit, and three groups with 40mm L/70 autocannons. On 1 September 1964, the regiment received the II Heavy Anti-aircraft Group in Bologna from the 121st Heavy Anti-aircraft Artillery Regiment. The group was re-equipped with 40mm L/70 autocannons and renamed IV Light Anti-aircraft Group. On 1 November 1964, the II Light Anti-aircraft Group of the regiment moved to Reggio Emilia. On 1 March 1970, the regiment's II and IV groups were transferred to the 121st Light Anti-aircraft Artillery Regiment and the 18th Light Anti-aircraft Artillery Regiment's III Group was renumbered as II Group.

During the 1975 army reform the army disbanded the regimental level and newly independent battalions were granted for the first time their own flags, respectively in the case of cavalry units, their own standard. On 18 November 1975, the 18th Light Anti-aircraft Artillery Regiment was disbanded and the next day the regiment's two remaining groups joined the 121st Light Anti-aircraft Artillery Regiment. Afterwards the flag of the 18th Light Anti-aircraft Artillery Regiment was transferred to the Shrine of the Flags in the Vittoriano in Rome for safekeeping.

On 2 May 1976, the 18th Field Artillery Group "Gran Sasso" was formed in Bracciano with the personnel and materiel of the I Group of the disbanded 13th Field Artillery Regiment. To avoid confusion with the support units of the Motorized Brigade "Pinerolo" the group was given the name Gran Sasso to commemorate the division, the regiment had served with in the Second Italo-Ethiopian War. On the same date, 2 May 1976, the group took custody of the flag of the 18th Artillery Regiment. On 12 November 1976, the President of the Italian Republic Giovanni Leone assigned with decree 846 the flag and traditions of the 18th Light Anti-aircraft Artillery Regiment to the group.

The group was assigned to the Artillery School and consisted of a command, a command and services battery, a battery with M114 155mm towed howitzers, a battery with M59 155mm towed field guns, and a battery with M115 203mm towed howitzers. In 1978, the group replaced the M114 with modern FH70 155mm towed howitzers.

On 31 March 1981, the 18th Field Artillery Group "Gran Sasso" was disbanded and the next day its personnel was used to form the Complementary Officers Cadets Group, which was assigned to the Artillery School. Once more the flag of the 18th Artillery Regiment was returned to the Shrine of the Flags in the Vittoriano.

=== Recent times ===
On 18 September 1992, the 18th Anti-aircraft Artillery Regiment was reformed in Rimini by reorganizing the 3rd Light Anti-aircraft Group of the 121st Light Anti-aircraft Artillery Regiment. The reformed regiment's 1st Anti-aircraft Group consisted of three batteries, which were equipped with Stinger man-portable air-defense systems and Skyguard surface-to-air missile systems.

On 30 June 1997, the 18th Anti-aircraft Artillery Regiment was disbanded and the regiment's flag transferred the next day to the Shrine of the Flags. On the same day, 1 July 1997, the flag of the 17th Anti-aircraft Artillery Regiment "Sforzesca" was moved from Villafranca to Rimini, where the 17th Anti-aircraft Artillery Regiment "Sforzesca" took over the base and units of the disbanded regiment.
