= Cesare Benelli =

Italian World War II general

- Born: 28 January 1885; Tempio Pausania, Kingdom of Italy
- Died: 28 November 1943 (aged 58); Chieti, Kingdom of Italy
- Military career
- Allegiance: Kingdom of Italy
- Branch: Royal Italian Army
- Service years: 1907–1943
- Rank: Major General
- Commands: 1st Anti-Aircraft Artillery Regiment; 24th Infantry Division "Pinerolo"
- Conflicts: World War I; Battle of Caporetto; Second Battle of the Piave River; World War II; North African campaign; Italian occupation of Greece
- Awards: Silver Medal of Military Valor; War Cross for Military Valor; Order of Saints Maurice and Lazarus

Cesare Camillo Benelli (28 January 1885 – 28 November 1943) was an Italian general during World War II.

== Biography ==
He was born in Tempio Pausania on 28 January 1885, the son of Olinto and Anna Maria Benelli. On 7 September 1905 he entered the Royal Military Academy of Artillery and Engineers in Turin, from which he graduated as artillery second lieutenant. He participated in the Italo-Turkish War, fighting in Libya, and subsequently in the First World War, where he fought with the rank of major in the 3rd Fortress Artillery Regiment, and then in the 62nd Siege Artillery Group, being awarded a Silver Medal of Military Valor (for his conduct during the retreat that followed the battle of Caporetto, in which he managed to save all of his artillery pieces) and a War Cross for Military Valor (during the Second Battle of the Piave River).

He was promoted to colonel on 16 September 1935, after which he commanded the 8th Artillery Regiment in Bologna and then the artillery of the Army Corps of Turin from 1935 to 1939. Having become a brigadier general on 30 June 1939, he was given command of the artillery of the 2nd Corps in Alessandria and then of the artillery of the 5th Army in Tripoli. In 1941 he returned to Rome, at the disposal of the Ministry of War, and from 5 September he was assigned to the command of the 13th Army Corps in Cagliari, for special assignments. On 18 October he replaced General Licurgo Zannini as the commander of the 24th Infantry Division "Pinerolo", stationed in Greece for occupation and anti-partisan duties. On 1 January 1942 he was promoted to the rank of major general.

During his command, the troops of his division committed one of the greatest massacres of civilians carried out by the Royal Italian Army in the Second World War, the Domenikon massacre. On 16 February 1943, about one kilometer from the village of Domenikon, in Thessaly, Greek partisans ambushed an Italian military convoy carrying food, killing nine soldiers of the "Pinerolo" Division and wounding fifteen more, including two officers. Benelli ordered to carry out a reprisal in the nearby village; he later wrote "the Greeks were to be punished". The men of the "Pinerolo" thus proceeded to round up and execute all men and boys over age 14 in Domenikon, then set the village on fire and sent the women to a concentration camp. Benelli bragged about the massacre, presenting it as an "example and warning for the future" and summarizing in his report: "Greek losses: killed during the battle: 8. Fugitives, hunted down and executed by the escort of the column: 7. Rounded up by the reinforcement company and executed: 16. Shot because they were trying to escape from the encirclement: 4. Shot by the squad sent from Tyrnavos: 8. Executed in Damasi: 97. In total 140 Greek subjects died". On 16 June 1943 Benelli issued a proclamation stating that in case of sabotage on the Larissa–Volos railway, fifty prisoners of the nearby Larissa concentration camp would be shot.

On 18 July 1943 he left the command of the division to General Adolfo Infante and returned to Italy, going to Rome on 19 July 1943 (the day of the first Allied air raid on the city) at the disposal of the Ministry of War, for special assignments. He died in Chieti from illness a few months later, on 28 November 1943.
