= 123rd Infantry Regiment "Chieti" =

Inactive Italian Army infantry unit

- 123° Reggimento Fanteria "Chieti"
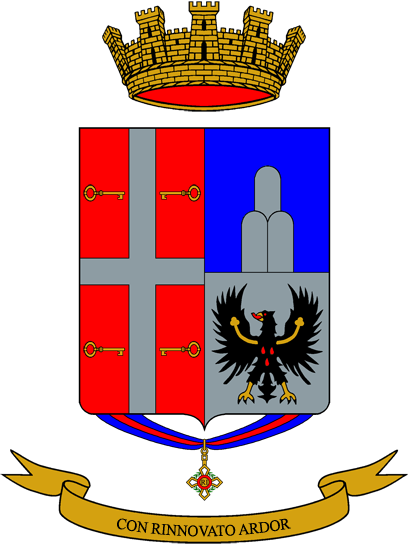
- Regimental coat of arms
- Active: 1 March 1915 – 1 Jan. 1920; 1 Feb. 1985 – 27 Sept. 2012
- Country: Italy
- Branch: Italian Army
- Garrison/HQ: Chieti
- Motto(s): "Con rinnovato ardor"
- Anniversaries: 10 August 1916 – Battle of Crni Hrib
- Decorations: 1× Military Order of Italy

Insignia
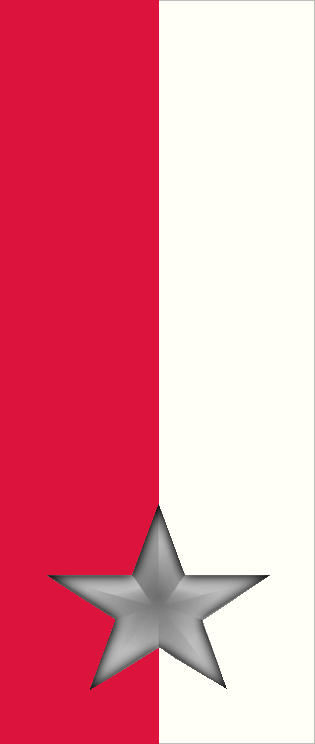
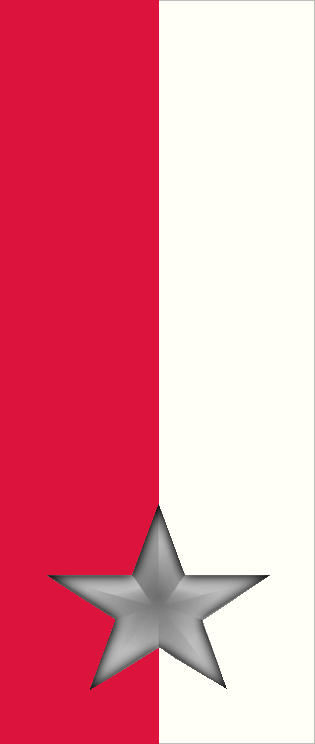
- Regimental gorget patches

The 123rd Infantry Regiment "Chieti" (Italian: 123° Reggimento Fanteria "Chieti") is an inactive unit of the Italian Army last based in Chieti. The regiment is named for the city of Chieti and part of the Italian Army's infantry arm.

The regiment was formed in preparation for Italy's entry into World War I. During the war the regiment fought on the Italian front and was disbanded once the war concluded. In 1985 the regiment was reformed as a battalion sized training unit in Chieti. In 1994 the regiment was reformed and continued as training unit until it was disbanded in 2012.

== History ==
=== Formation ===
On 1 March 1915 the command of the Brigade "Chieti" and the 123rd Infantry Regiment (Brigade "Chieti") were formed in Chieti by the regimental depot of the 18th Infantry Regiment (Brigade "Acqui"). On the same date the 124th Infantry Regiment (Brigade "Chieti") was formed in L'Aquila by the regimental depot of the 13th Infantry Regiment (Brigade "Pinerolo"). Both regiments consisted of three battalions, which each fielded four fusilier companies and one machine gun section. The Brigade "Chieti" formed, together with the Brigade "Barletta", the 31st Division.

=== World War I ===
During World War I the Brigade "Chieti" fought on the Italian front: in August and September 1915 the brigade fought in the Second Battle of the Isonzo on the Karst plateau near Castelnuovo del Carso. In October of the same year the brigade fought in the Third Battle of the Isonzo near Polazzo and in November it fought in the Fourth Battle of the Isonzo. From March to July 1916 the brigade was again on the Karst plateau fighting on the slopes of Monte Sei Busi. In August 1916 the brigade fought in the Sixth Battle of the Isonzo at Doberdò and on the slopes of Črni hrib. In 1917 the brigade was transferred to the Val Giudicarie valley, where it remained until fall 1918, when the brigade was transferred to the Val d'Astico valley for the Battle of Vittorio Veneto.

After the war the brigade and its two regiments were disbanded on 1 January 1920.

=== Cold War ===
On 1 February 1985 the detachment of the 235th Infantry Battalion "Piceno" in Chieti became an autonomous unit and was renamed 123rd Infantry Battalion "Chieti" and assigned the flag and traditions of the 123rd Infantry Regiment "Chieti". The battalion consisted of a command, a command and services company, and two recruits companies providing basic training to recruits. On 17 April 1985 the regiment's flag arrived in Chieti, after having been stored at the Vittoriano in Rome since 1920.

=== Recent times ===
In 1992 the battalion was renamed 123rd Battalion "Chieti". On 4 September 1994 the 123rd Battalion "Chieti" lost its autonomy and the next day the battalion entered the reformed 123rd Regiment "Chieti". On 1 July 2005 the regiment was assigned to the Training Units Grouping and was renamed 123rd Volunteer Training Regiment "Chieti". On 1 April 2006 the 57th Battalion "Abruzzi" in Sulmona was assigned to the regiment.

On 27 September 2012 the regiment was disbanded and the flag of the regiment was returned to the Shrine of the Flags in the Vittoriano in Rome.
