= Giovanni Ravalli =

Italian military officer (1909–1998)

- Born: 21 September 1909; Monterosso Almo, Sicily, Kingdom of Italy
- Died: 30 April 1998 (aged 88); Rome, Italy
- Military career
- Allegiance: Kingdom of Italy
- Branch: Royal Italian Army
- Rank: Lieutenant
- Unit: 24th Infantry Division Pinerolo

Giovanni Ravalli (21 September 1909 – 30 April 1998) was an Italian military officer who was imprisoned for war crimes he committed during the Axis occupation of Greece during World War II. Following a pardon, he served as police prefect of Palermo; during his tenure, he investigated the theft of Caravaggio's Nativity with St. Francis and St. Lawrence.

== Army service ==
Giovanni Ravalli was born on 21 September 1909 in Monterosso Almo. During the course of World War II, Ravalli served in the 24th Infantry Division Pinerolo, 13th Infantry Regiment, in the rank of Lieutenant. In this capacity he became the head of intelligence of the Italian garrison in the city of Kastoria, Greece. Despite the heavy presence of the Italians in Kastoria, its outskirts remained in the control of EAM-ELAS guerrillas which in turn received wide support from local Greeks, Slavic speakers, Vlachs and elements of the collaborationist Hellenic Gendarmerie. Ravalli went on to establish links with Andon Kalchev's Ohrana (a pro-Bulgarian Slavic-speaking militia) and German troops stationed at Florina, disarming the Gendarmerie to cut short ELAS' weapon supply. In July 1943, ELAS stepped up its attacks around Kastoria, exploiting a period of Italian passivity. News of the Allied invasion of Sicily caused a drop in morale among Ohrana's ranks, leading to desertions. In August, the Pinerolo Division began to gradually withdraw from Kastoria as Italy was on the edge of signing an armistice with the Allies. Ravalli surrendered to ELAS along with 15 Ohrana members.

== Trial and imprisonment ==
Following the end of World War II, in 1948 Greece and Italy signed a secret treaty according to which Greece would abstain from prosecuting most Italian war criminals, leaving Ravalli as the only Italian prosecuted by the Special War Criminals Court in Athens. Several trials against Italians were conducted in local courts for collaborators. Trials against Italian war criminals responsible for atrocities committed on the Ionian Islands were initiated only in 1967 and were halted prematurely due to the passage of the statute of limitations for enforcement of the penalty.

Ravalli was tried by the Special War Criminals Court of Athens, with proceedings beginning on 18 February 1946. Ravalli was convicted of:

- Taking part in a meeting with Carabinieri commander Emilio Jona and colonel Venieri during which the decision was taken to kill 50 Greek citizens as a punitive measure
- Failing to inform his superiors about a series of murders committed by the Ohrana as well as the routine use of torture by the Italian army in the Kastoria prison as well as during counter-insurgency operations
- Imprisoning civilians in inhumane conditions without a probable cause
- Failing to inform his superiors of looting committed by the Italian army and the Ohrana
- Terrorizing the local population through wanton arrests and house searches
- Taking part in executions

The prosecutors focused strongly on Ravalli's arming of the Slavic population of Kastoria, an issue that sparked heated debates within the Greek public. Accusations were leveled by the press also against the EAM/ELAS, accused of fostering Macedonian independentism at Tito's orders. On 10 June 1946, Ravalli was sentenced to a total of three life sentences, his possessions were confiscated by the state and he was ordered to pay the costs arising from the trial.

Ravalli served his sentence in prisons located in Kozani and Thessaloniki. In 1959, he was pardoned by the Greek government after Italy threatened to halt the payment of war reparations. News of his release led to public outrage in Kastoria, whose citizens sent a protest telegram to King Paul of Greece.

== Postwar career ==
Following his return to Italy, Ravalli was appointed police prefect of Palermo. In October 1969, two thieves entered the Oratory of San Lorenzo in Palermo and stole Caravaggio's Nativity with St. Francis and St. Lawrence from its frame. Experts estimated its value at $20 million. Ravalli played a prominent role in its unsuccessful investigation and gained a reputation for combating the Sicilian mafia, while also serving as an advisor to the Italian prime minister. He died on 30 April 1998, having retired to his home at 179 Via Cristoforo Colombo, south Rome.
