= 24th Infantry Division "Pinerolo" =

WW2 Royal Italian Army formation

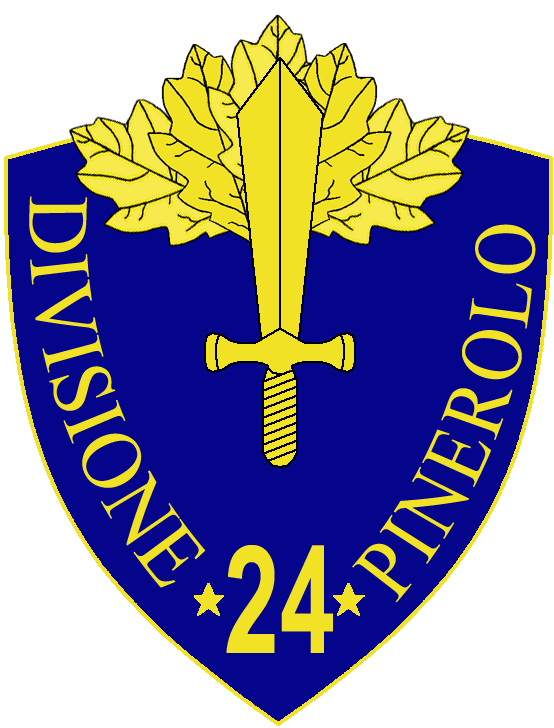
- 24th Infantry Division "Pinerolo" insignia
- Active: 1939–1943; 1952–1961
- Country: Kingdom of Italy
- Branch: Royal Italian Army
- Type: Infantry
- Size: Division
- Garrison/HQ: Chieti
- Engagements: World War II

Commanders
- Notable commanders: Adolfo Infante

Insignia
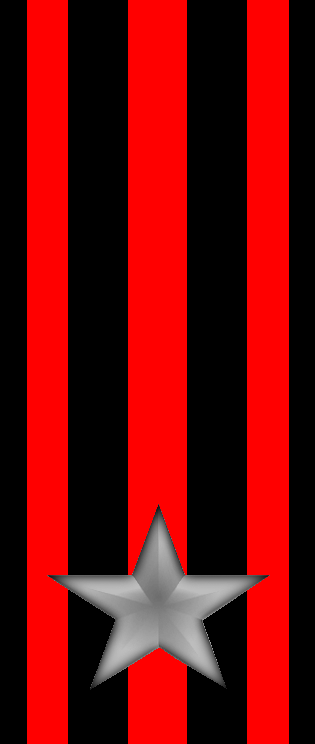
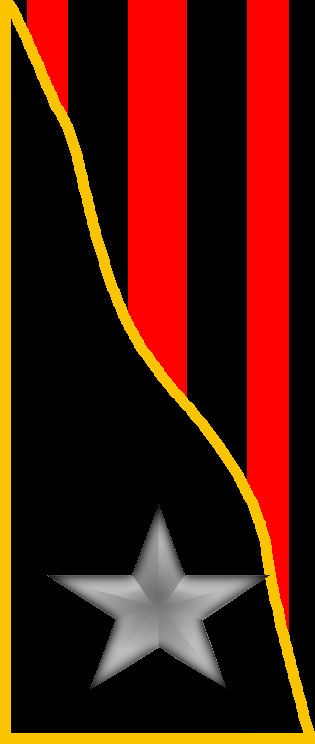
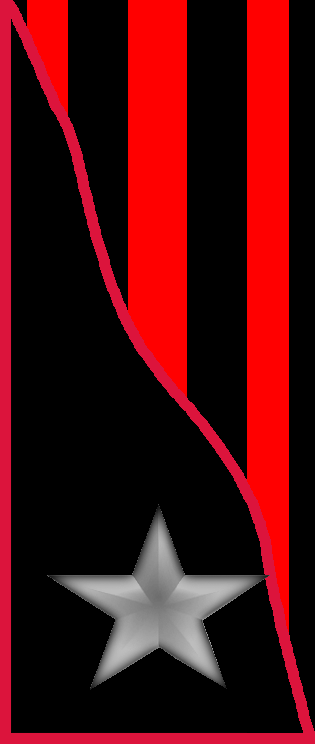
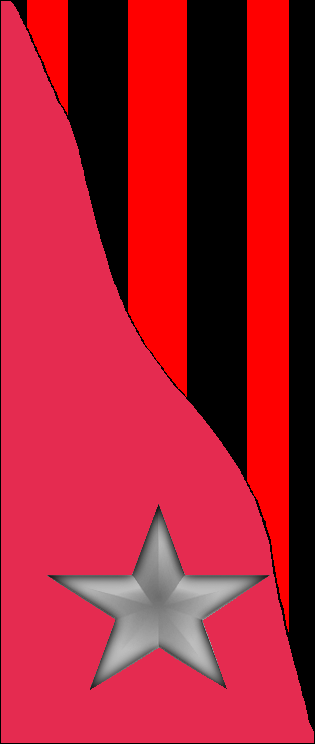
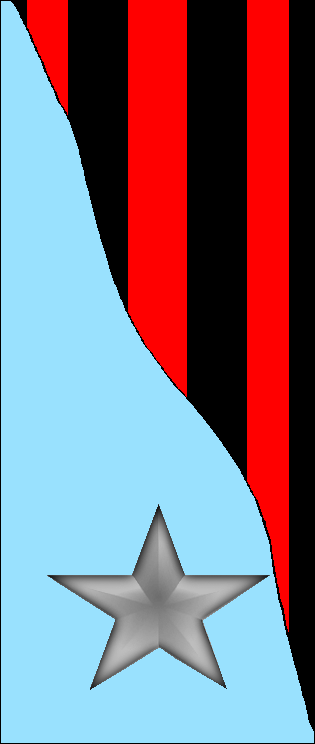
- Identification symbol: Pinerolo Division gorget patches

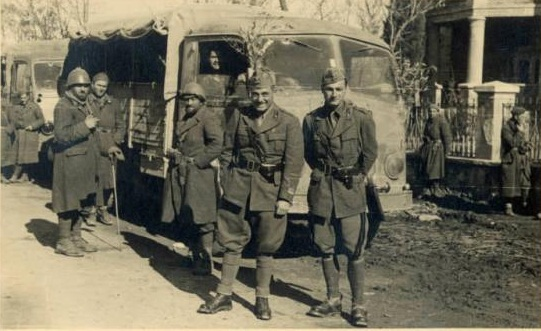
18th Artillery Regiment "Pinerolo" troops entering Ohrid in Yugoslavia on 12 April 1941

The 24th Infantry Division "Pinerolo" (Italian: 24ª Divisione di fanteria "Pinerolo") was an infantry division of the Royal Italian Army during World War II. The division was based in Chieti, with its regiments in the Abruzzo region. The division was named for the city of Pinerolo. The division's regimental depots were shared with the 62nd Infantry Division "Marmarica", which was based in Derna in Libya and recruited its men from and trained them in Abruzzo.

== History ==
The division's lineage begins with the Brigade "Pinerolo" established on 21 December 1821, which on 19 December 1831 split to form the 1st and 2nd infantry regiments under the brigade's command. On 4 May 1839 the two regiments were re-numbered as 13th Regiment Brigade "Pinerolo" and 14th Regiment Brigade "Pinerolo".

=== World War I ===
The brigade fought on the Italian front in World War I. On 10 November 1926 the brigade assumed the name of XXIV Infantry Brigade and received the 225th Infantry Regiment "Arezzo" from the disbanded Brigade "Arezzo". The brigade was the infantry component of the 24th Territorial Division of Chieti, which also included the 18th Artillery Regiment. In 1934 the division changed its name to 24th Infantry Division "Gran Sasso".

=== Second Italo-Ethiopian War ===
The division participated in the Second Italo-Ethiopian War, where it operated in the Tigray Region and fought in the Battle of Shire. After the war the division returned to Italy. From early 1935 to 15 September 1936, while the Gran Sasso division was in Africa, the division's depots continued to train conscrips, who were used to temporarily reform the 95th Infantry School Regiment "Udine", 96th Infantry Regiment "Udine", 97th Infantry Regiment "Genova", and 44th Artillery Regiment, which were assigned to the temporarily formed 124th Infantry Division "Gran Sasso II". After the 24th Infantry Division "Gran Sasso" returned from Ethiopia the 124th Infantry Division "Gran Sasso II" and its regiments were disbanded and their personnel transferred to the regiments returning from their war.

On 1 March 1937 the 225th Infantry Regiment "Arezzo" was transferred to the 63rd Infantry Division "Cirene" in Libya. On 1 March 1938 the 225th Infantry Regiment "Arezzo" was renamed 158th Infantry Regiment "Liguria" and on the same day the 225th Infantry Regiment "Arezzo" was raised anew in Ascoli Piceno.

On 24 May 1939 the division ceded 225th Infantry Regiment "Arezzo" to the newly activated 53rd Infantry Division "Arezzo". On the same day the XXIV Infantry Brigade was dissolved, with the two remaining infantry regiments coming under direct command of the division, and the 18th Artillery Regiment was given the name "Pinerolo".

=== World War II ===
During the Italian invasion of France in June 1940 the division was the reserve of I Army Corps and remained in the area Moncenisio and Bardonecchia.

==== Greco-Italian War ====
In January 1941 the division was sent to Albania to reinforce the crumbling Italian front during the Greek offensive in the Greco-Italian War. On 18 January 1941 the division was in Berat and entered the front near Këlcyrë. The division fought defensive battles for the next month ending with the defense of Tepelenë. From 9 March 1941 the division participated in the Italian Spring Offensive and advanced after strenuous combat to Çarshovë on the Greek-Albanian border.

On 6 April the Axis Invasion of Yugoslavia commenced and on 8 April 1941 the Pinerolo moved to the Albanian-Yugoslav border near Lake Ohrid, crossed the border and took Ohrid in North Macedonia. From 9 April the division was in Prrenjas.

==== Greece ====
In June 1941 the division transferred to Larissa in Thessaly, Greece to suppress the growing Greek Resistance. During its time in Thessaly the Pinerolo murdered Greek civilians in the Domenikon massacre. In November 1941 the regimental depot of the 50th Infantry Regiment "Parma" of the 49th Infantry Division "Parma" raised the 313th Infantry Regiment "Pinerolo" in Macerata. The 313th Infantry Regiment joined the Pinerolo in Greece in March 1942. While the Pinerolo was on occupation duty in Greece the depot of the 14th Infantry Regiment "Pinerolo" raised on 1 January 1942 the 235th Infantry Regiment "Piceno" for the 152nd Infantry Division "Piceno".

The division continued on anti-partisan duty until the Armistice of Cassibile was announced on 8 September 1943. In the confusion after the armistice the division was the only Italian division in continental Greece to refuse German demands to surrender. While the 29th Infantry Division "Piemonte", 36th Infantry Division "Forlì", 37th Infantry Division "Modena", 56th Infantry Division "Casale", and 59th Infantry Division "Cagliari" surrendered to the inferior German forces the Pinerolo defended Larissa against German attacks. On 15 September the division moved into the Pindus mountain range, where the commander of the division Adolfo Infante struck with the mediation of a British military mission a collaboration agreement with the Greek People's Liberation Army (ELAS). However, by October the ELAS forced the remaining troops of the Pinerolo to surrender their supplies and weapons, and used the Italian soldiers as forced labor for the rest of the war. The remnants of the division were repatriated to Italy in March 1945.

On 15 April 1952 the Italian Army raised the Infantry Division "Pinerolo" anew. On 1 September 1962 the division was reduced to brigade and it has been active as such since then as Mechanized Brigade "Pinerolo").

== Organization ==
=== Second Italo-Abyssinian War 1935 ===
- 24th Infantry Division "Gran Sasso"
  - 13th Infantry Regiment "Pinerolo"
  - 14th Infantry Regiment "Pinerolo"
  - 225th Infantry Regiment "Arezzo"
  - 18th Artillery Regiment "Gran Sasso"
  - 524th Machine Gun Battalion
  - 24th Replacements Battalion
  - 24th Engineer Company

Royal Italian Army divisions in the Ethiopian Campaign had a Pack-Mules unit of 3,000 mules and three regimental truck units with 20 light trucks each.

=== World War II ===
24th Infantry Division "Pinerolo" organization in 1940

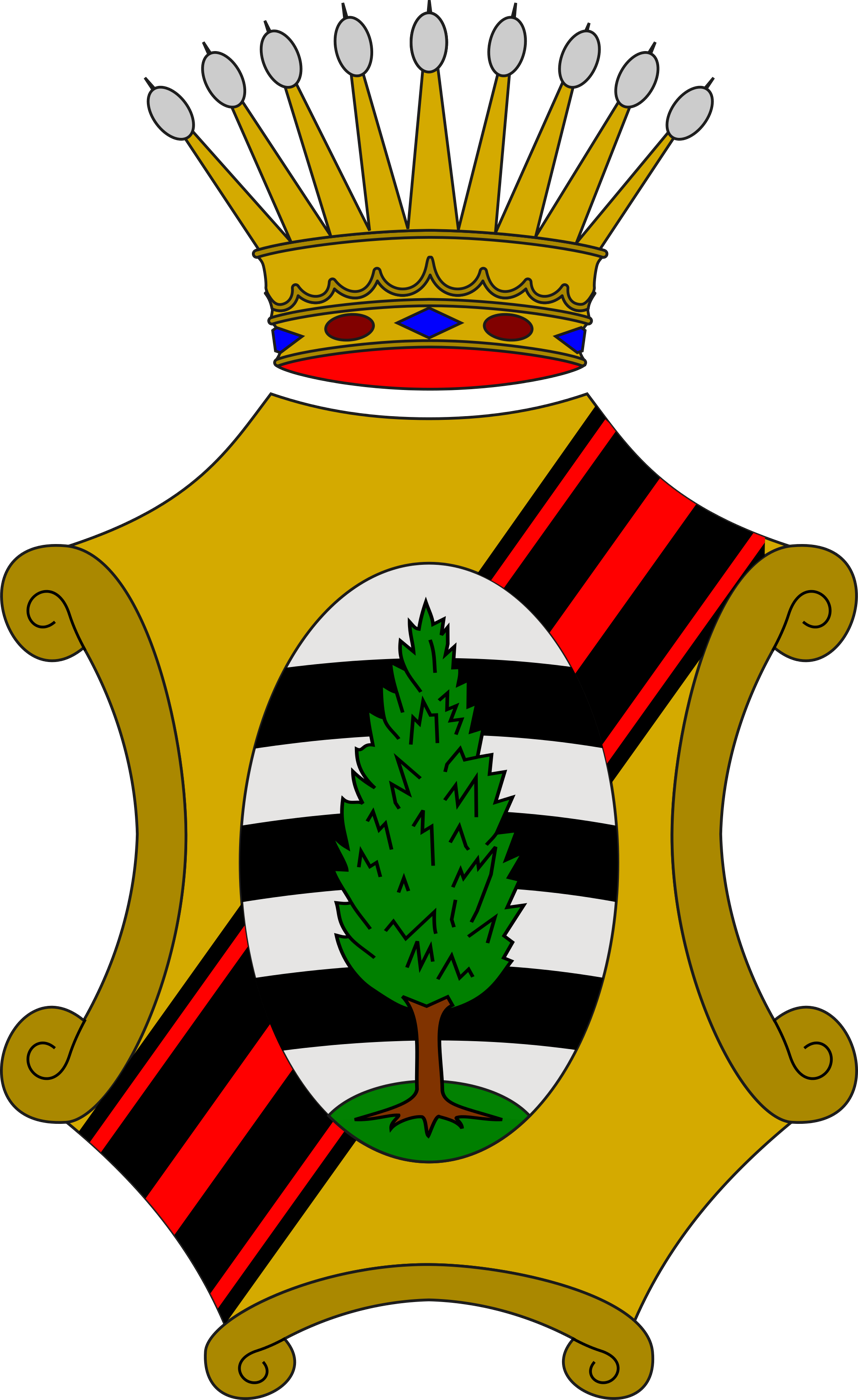
Coat of Arms of the 14th Infantry Regiment "Pinerolo", 1939

- 24th Infantry Division "Pinerolo", in Chieti
  - Headquarters
    - Command Company
    - 122nd Carabinieri Section
    - 123rd Carabinieri Section
    - 65th Field Post Office
    - 24th Infantry Division Command Transport Squad
  - 13th Infantry Regiment "Pinerolo", in L'Aquila
    - Command Company
    - 3 × Fusilier battalions
    - Support Weapons Battery (65/17 mod. 13 infantry support guns)
    - Mortar Company (81mm Mod. 35 mortars)
  - 14th Infantry Regiment "Pinerolo", in Chieti
    - Command Company
    - 3 × Fusilier battalions
    - Support Weapons Battery (65/17 mod. 13 infantry support guns)
    - Mortar Company (81mm Mod. 35 mortars)
  - 313th Infantry Regiment "Pinerolo" (formed on 1 November 1941 in Macerata by the depot of the 50th Infantry Regiment "Parma")
    - Command Company
    - 3 × Fusilier battalions
    - Cannons Company (47/32 mod. 35 anti-tank guns)
    - Mortar Company (81mm Mod. 35 mortars)
  - 18th Artillery Regiment "Pinerolo", in L'Aquila
    - Command Unit
    - I Group (100/17 mod. 14 howitzers)
    - II Group (75/27 mod. 06 field guns; transferred in December 1940 to the 32nd Artillery Regiment "Marche")
    - III Group (75/27 mod. 06 field guns; transferred in December 1940 to the 56th Artillery Regiment "Casale")
    - II Group (75/13 mod. 15 mountain guns; transferred in December 1940 from the 32nd Artillery Regiment "Marche")
    - III Group (75/13 mod. 15 mountain guns; transferred in December 1940 from the 56th Artillery Regiment "Casale")
    - 324th Anti-aircraft battery (20/65 Mod. 35 anti-aircraft guns)
    - Ammunition and Supply Unit
  - XXIV Mortar Battalion (81mm Mod. 35 mortars)
  - 24th Anti-tank Company (47/32 mod. 35 anti-tank guns)
  - 24th Telegraph and Radio Operators Company
  - 61st Engineer Company
  - 32nd Medical Section
    - 456th Field Hospital
    - 457th Field Hospital
    - 1 × Field Hospital
    - 1 × Surgical unit
  - 24th Autocarrette Section
  - 82nd Transport Section (Fiat 666, Fiat 626, Alfa Romeo 800)
  - 132nd Supply Section

Attached from 10 December 1940 until March 1942:

- 136th CC.NN. Legion "Tre Monti"
  - CXXX CC.NN. Battalion (remained attached to the division until September 1943)
  - CXXXVI CC.NN. Battalion
  - 136th CC.NN. Machine Gun Company

== Military honors ==
For its conduct during the Greco-Italian War the President of Italy awarded on 11 September 1959 to the 13th Infantry Regiment "Pinerolo" Italy's highest military honor, the Gold Medal of Military Valor.

- 13th Infantry Regiment "Pinerolo" on 11 September 1959

== Commanding officers ==
The division's commanding officers were:

- Generale di Divisione Angelo Stirpe (1938 – 9 June 1940)
- Generale di Divisione Giuseppe De Stefanis (10 June 1940 – 18 April 1941)
- Generale di Divisione Licurgo Zannini (19 April 1941 – 16 October 1941)
- Generale di Divisione Cesare Benelli (17 October 1941 – 9 July 1943)
- Generale di Divisione Adolfo Infante (10 July 1943 – 1 June 1944)

== War crimes ==
The names of five Italian officers attached to the division were included in the Central Registry of War Criminals and Security Suspects, a database set up by the Supreme Headquarters Allied Expeditionary Force in 1945 to try war criminals from the Axis powers, including Italy. In addition to perpetrating the Domenikon massacre, soldiers from the division also tortured Greek prisoners and committed several rapes while stationed in Greece. One member of the division who was involved in these war crimes, Giovanni Ravalli, was convicted after the war's end, though he was subsequently pardoned.
