= Domenikon massacre =

Italian anti-resistance action

Coordinates: 39°47′31″N 22°07′15″E

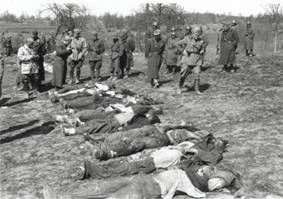
- Dead civilians at Kaukaki
- Location: Kaukaki, Greece
- Date: 16–17 February 1943
- Target: Male civilians
- Attack type: Mass murder, summary execution
- Deaths: 175
- Perpetrator: 24th Infantry Division Pinerolo

The Domenikon massacre (Greek: Σφαγή του Δομένικου; Italian: La strage di Domenikon) was a violent reprisal by the Italian Royal Army's 24th Infantry Division Pinerolo during the Axis Occupation of Greece. On 16–17 February 1943, Italian troops executed a total of 175 male civilians from Domeniko, Thessaly, Greece. They also executed local native civilians from the Mesohori, Amouri and Damasi villages. Domenikon and Mesohori were also set ablaze.

== Background ==
In the aftermath of the Allied defeat during the Battle of Greece, and the subsequent Axis occupation of Greece, a group of 72 Greek People's Liberation Army (ELAS) guerrillas created a base outside the village of Oxia, close to Domenikon. The guerrillas received an intelligence report stating that a force of 350 Italian and Aromanian troops were planning to assemble in the village of Mesohori in order to conduct a counter-insurgency operation in the Verdikousia area. The ELAS fighters decided to ambush an Italian column in support of their comrades on Mount Olympus.

In the early morning of 16 February 1943, the local Greek rebels positioned themselves on the Mauritsa hillock 2 kilometres (1.2 miles) south of Domenikon, but plans of organising an ambush at the Asprogia hill were abandoned at the last moment due to erosion. At 10.00 a.m., an Italian column consisting of three trucks and three motorcycles emerged on a road opposite the hillock. The rebels fired at the Italians immediately before the whole convoy had entered the engagement area, thus allowing an unseen motorcycle at the end of the column to escape and make its way to the Axis encampment at Mesohori. Nine soldiers were killed and a general was severely wounded, before the guerrillas retreated to the Profitis Ilias mountain.

== Massacre ==
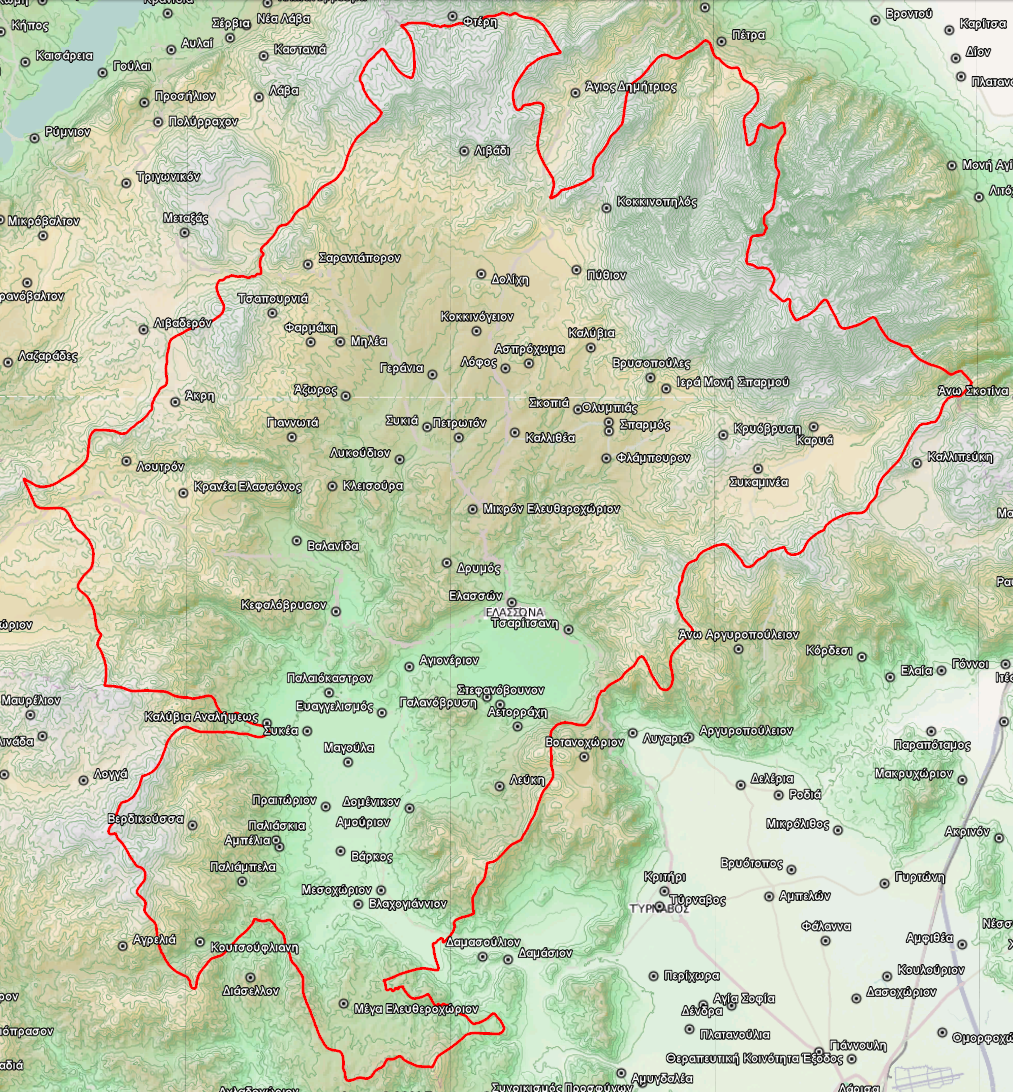
Map of the Elassona province.

In the meantime, Italian military personnel began amassing at Mesohori and Mauritsa, with plans being laid concerning a punitive expedition. Civilians in Domenikon were ordered to remain inside their houses. The Domenikiots obeyed the order believing that they would avoid punishment since they had not participated in or had any foreknowledge of the ambush. Forty vehicles carrying members of the 24th Infantry Division Pinerolo then arrived at the village. Aided by a local collaborationist mayor, Italian troops rounded up the local population at the village square, while also setting fire to 150 houses. 25 men accused of directly participating in the assault on the column were taken to Mauritsa where they were executed. Women and small children were then transferred to the Amouri village, while all males above the age of 14 were told that they would be sent to a concentration camp in Larissa.

Prisoners from Domenikon were joined by men arrested in Mesohori, Amouri and Damasi. A column consisting of 138 prisoners and the accompanying Italian soldiers moved through Mesohori, which was also set aflame while 12 local citizens were also shot to death. At approximately 22:30, when the column reached the Kaukaki area, a messenger sent by the Italian general who had been injured at the Mauritsa incident, delivered a message, ordering the summary execution of the male population. The detainees were shot in groups of seven; executions continued until the evening of the following day, when Italians departed along with the Domenikon mayor's family.

On 19 February 1943, news of the massacre reached the deputy commander of the Elassona Gendarmerie department, Captain Nikolaos Babalis, who sent two official complaints to the International Committee of the Red Cross, Interior Ministry and Gendarmerie headquarters. Babalis was arrested by the Italian authorities and sentenced to death, but he managed to avoid execution as the concentration camp where he was held was liberated by Allied troops.

== Aftermath ==
According to historian Lidia Santarelli, the massacre was the first in a series of repressive measures carried out in the spring and summer of 1943, following an order by General Carlo Geloso, commander of the Italian forces of occupation, stating that rebellious action would result in collective punishment. The order was based on the notion that in order to crush the Greek partisan movement, whole local communities had to be wiped out, including measures such as "aerial bombardment and heavy artillery fire", "pillaging of their food supplies", and "the deportation to concentration camps of the village chiefs and all of the men who made up the community council".

After the Italian capitulation in 1943, German forces moved immediately to take over the Italian occupation zone. Most of the Italian occupying divisions surrendered to the numerically inferior Germans, but notably, the Pinerolo Division, responsible for the Domenikon Massacre, was the only one to join sides with the Greek Resistance.

Interest in the massacre was renewed when documentary film-maker Giovanni Donfrancesco made La guerra sporca di Mussolini (Mussolini's Dirty War), which was first broadcast on 14 March 2008 on the History Channel - the Italian TV Network RAI on the other hand refused to broadcast it. A Greek documentary, Δομένικο μια ξεχασμένη θυσία (Domenikon a Forsaken Sacrifice), was broadcast on the Hellenic Broadcasting Corporation in 2008. Italian channel Rete 4 screened the documentary on 3 January 2010. On 16 February 2009, the Italian ambassador in Athens, Giancarlo Scarade, officially apologised for the massacre. On 16 February 2015, Elassona mayor Nikos Evaggelou announced his support of the Greek government's plans to claim war reparations for the massacre.

== See also ==
- Italian fascism and racism
- Italian war crimes
- List of Italian concentration camps
- Foibe massacres
