= 225th Infantry Regiment "Arezzo" =

Inactive Italian Army infantry unit

- 225° Reggimento Fanteria "Arezzo"
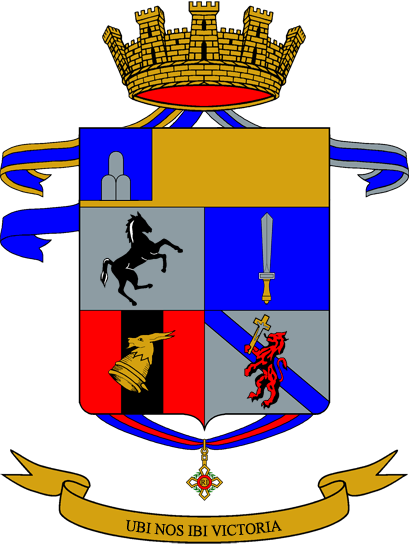
- Regimental coat of arms
- Active: 18 May 1916 – 12 Sept. 1943; 16 Nov. 1975 – 22 Jan. 1999
- Country: Italy
- Branch: Italian Army
- Garrison/HQ: Arezzo
- Motto: "Ubi nos ibi victoria"
- Anniversaries: 25 May 1917 – Battle of Monte Ermada
- Decorations: 2× Military Order of Italy; 1× Gold Medal of Military Valor; 1× Silver Medal of Military Valor; 1× Bronze Medal of Military Valor

Insignia
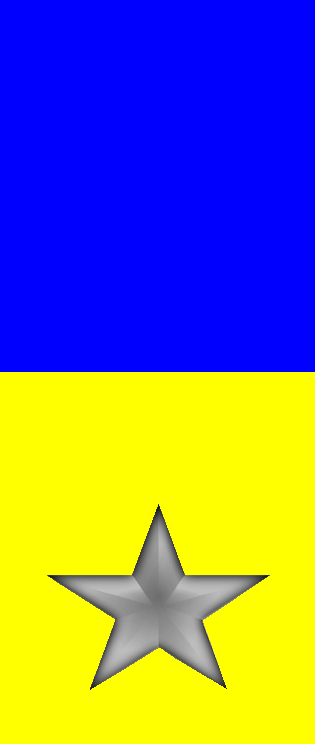
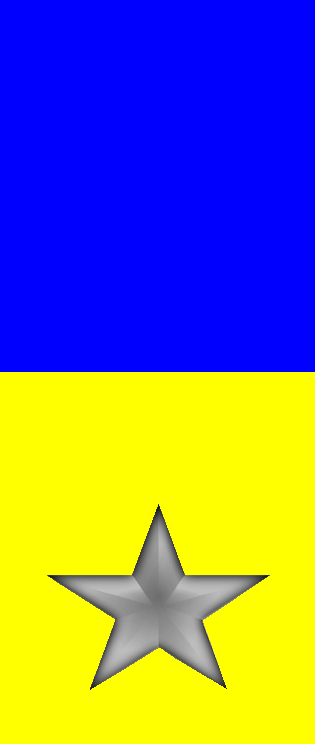
- Regimental gorget patches

The 225th Infantry Regiment "Arezzo" (Italian: 225° Reggimento Fanteria "Arezzo") is an inactive infantry unit of the Italian Army. The regiment is named for the city of Arezzo in Tuscany and part of the Italian Army's infantry arm.

The regiment was formed during World War I and fought on the Italian front, for which the regiment was awarded Italy's highest military honor the Gold Medal of Military Valor. In 1935–36 the regiment participated in the Second Italo-Ethiopian War. In May 1939, the regiment joined the 53rd Infantry Division "Arezzo", which in June 1940 was transferred to occupied Albania. In 1940–41, the division fought in the Greco-Italian War and then returned to Albania, where the division and regiment were disbanded by invading German forces four days after the announcement of the Armistice of Cassibile on 8 September 1943. In 1975, the regiment was reformed as a battalion sized training unit in Arezzo. In 1992, the regiment was reformed and continued as training unit until it was disbanded in 1999.

== History ==
=== World War I ===
The 225th Infantry Regiment (Brigade "Arezzo") was formed during World War I on 18 May 1916 in Castelfranco Veneto near the Italian Front. The regiment consisted of three battalions, which each fielded four fusilier companies and one machine gun section. The regiment's units had been formed by the following regimental depots: the command of the I Battalion and the battalion's 1st and 2nd companies by the 7th Infantry Regiment (Brigade "Cuneo") in Milan, the I Battalion's 3rd and 4th companies by the 68th Infantry Regiment (Brigade "Palermo") in Milan, the II Battalion by the 42nd Infantry Regiment (Brigade "Modena") in Lodi, and the III Battalion by the 77th Infantry Regiment (Brigade "Toscana") in Brescia. The regimental depot of the 68th Infantry Regiment also had formed the command of the 225th Infantry Regiment and the command of the Brigade "Arezzo", to which the regiment was assigned together with the 226th Infantry Regiment (Brigade "Arezzo").

The brigade fought in July 1916 on Monte Zebio in the Battle of Asiago, and then in October of the same year in the Eighth Battle of the Isonzo at Monfalcone. In May and June 1917 the brigade fought in the Tenth Battle of the Isonzo initially at Monfalcone and Duino and then on the slopes of Flondar and Monte Ermada. In August and September 1917 the brigade fought in the Eleventh Battle of the Isonzo.

In June 1918 the brigade fought in the Second Battle of the Piave River near the mouth of the Piave river and at Caposile. For their conduct during the war both regiments of the Brigade "Arezzo" were awarded Italy's highest military honor, the Gold Medal of Military Valor.

=== Interwar years ===
After World War I the Royal Italian Army disbanded the brigades and the regiments formed during the war, with the exception of brigades, whose regiments had both been awarded a Gold Medal of Military Valor. In 1926 the 225th Infantry Regiment moved from Foggia to Ascoli Piceno and on 30 September of the same year the command of the Brigade "Arezzo" and the 226th Infantry Regiment were disbanded, while the 225th Infantry Regiment, now renamed 225th Infantry Regiment "Arezzo", was assigned to the XXIV Infantry Brigade, which was the infantry component of the 24th Territorial Division of Chieti. In 1934 the division changed its name to 24th Infantry Division "Gran Sasso". A name change that also extended to the division's infantry brigade.

=== Second Italo-Ethiopian War ===
On 30 May 1935 the depot of the 225th Infantry Regiment "Arezzo" in Ascoli Piceno reformed the 97th Infantry Regiment "Genova", as replacement for the 225th Infantry Regiment "Arezzo", which, along with the rest of the 24th Infantry Division "Gran Sasso", was mobilized for the Second Italo-Ethiopian War. Together with the 19th Infantry Division "Gavinana" the Gran Sasso operated in the Tigray Region and fought in March 1936 in the Battle of Shire, for which the 225th Infantry Regiment "Arezzo" was awarded a Bronze Medal of Military Valor.

After the war the division returned to Italy and on 15 September 1936 the 97th Infantry Regiment "Genova" was disbanded and its personnel integrated into the 225th Infantry Regiment "Arezzo". On 1 March 1937 the 225th Infantry Regiment "Arezzo" was transferred to the 63rd Infantry Division "Cirene", which was based in Libya and consequently the regiment moved there. On 1 March 1938 the 225th Infantry Regiment "Arezzo" in Libya was renamed 158th Infantry Regiment "Liguria" and on the same day the 225th Infantry Regiment "Arezzo" was reformed in Ascoli Piceno and once again assigned to the "Gran Sasso" division.

On 24 May 1939 the "Gran Sasso" division ceded the 225th Infantry Regiment "Arezzo" to the newly activated 53rd Infantry Division "Arezzo". In June 1939 the division was transferred to Albania and based in Shkodër in the country's North.

=== World War II ===
At the outbreak of World War II the regiment consisted of a command, a command company, three fusilier battalions, a support weapons battery equipped with 65/17 infantry support guns, and a mortar company equipped with 81mm Mod. 35 mortars. From 30 October 1940 the Arezzo division's units were sent to the South of Albania to reinforce Italian units fighting the Greco-Italian War. From 20 November the entire division was engaged in combat against Greek forces in the Shkumbin valley.

The Arezzo division remained at the front for the duration of the war and when the Greeks retreated after the German invasion of Greece commenced the division advanced to Sarantaporos in Greece. For its conduct during the war the 225th Infantry Regiment "Arezzo" was awarded a Silver Medal of Military Valor.

After the war the Arezzo division moved to Korçë in Albania, where it performed anti-partisan duties until September 1943. After the announcement of the Armistice of Cassibile on 8 September 1943 the division was disbanded by German forces on 12 September 1943. However a large number of the division's troops escaped and joined partisans operating in the area.

=== Cold War ===
During the 1975 army reform the army disbanded the regimental level and newly independent battalions were granted for the first time their own flags. On 31 October 1973 the 84th Infantry Regiment "Venezia" in Siena had been disbanded and reduced to Recruits Training Battalion "Venezia" with four recruits companies in Siena and one recruits company in Arezzo. On 15 November 1975 the Recruits Training Battalion "Venezia" was renamed 84th Infantry Battalion "Venezia" and the next day, on 16 November 1975, the detached company in Arezzo was renamed 225th Infantry Battalion "Arezzo" and assigned the flag and traditions of the 225th Infantry Regiment "Arezzo". The battalion was assigned to the Motorized Brigade "Friuli" as the brigade's recruits training battalion. The battalion consisted of a command, a command platoon, and three recruits companies. In 1987 the command platoon was increased to command and services company.

=== Recent times ===
On 13 September 1992 the 225th Infantry Battalion "Arezzo" lost its autonomy and the next day the battalion entered the reformed 225th Regiment "Arezzo".

The regiment was disbanded on 22 January 1999 and the regiment's flag was Ítransferred to the Shrine of the Flags in the Vittoriano in Rome.
