= Adolfo Infante =

Italian general

- Born: 7 December 1891; Mantua, Kingdom of Italy
- Died: 1970 (age 79); Mantua, Italy
- Military career
- Allegiance: Kingdom of Italy
- Branch: Royal Italian Army
- Rank: Lieutenant General
- Commands: 10th Artillery Regiment; 132nd Armoured Division Ariete; 24th Infantry Division Pinerolo
- Conflicts: World War I; Battle of Caporetto; Second Battle of the Piave River; Battle of Vittorio Veneto; World War II; North African campaign; First Battle of El Alamein; Battle of Alam Halfa; Operation Achse
- Awards: Silver Medal of Military Valor; War Merit Cross; Military Order of Savoy; Order of the Crown of Italy; Order of Merit of the Italian Republic; Legion of Merit

Adolfo Infante (7 December 1891 – 1970) was an Italian general during World War II.

== Biography ==
=== Early life and career ===
He was born in Mantua on 7 December 1891, the son of an artillery officer. He participated in the First World War with the rank of artillery captain, earning a Silver Medal of Military Valor for his behaviour during the retreat across the Tagliamento, following the battle of Caporetto. From 1935 to 1937 he was commander of the 10th Artillery Regiment, and from 1937 he served first as Chief of Staff of the XX Army Corps stationed in Libya, then (from October 1939 to January 1940) as Chief of Staff of the 1st Army, then under the command of General Pietro Pintor, and finally as Military Attaché at the Italian Embassy in Washington DC. In August 1939 he was promoted to Brigadier General.

=== World War II ===
From 1941 to 1942 he was aide-de-camp to the King of Italy Victor Emmanuel III, and in July 1942, after being promoted to Major General in May, he became commander of the 132nd Armoured Division Ariete in North Africa till September, when he was transferred to Delease and then to the Libya General Headquarters until December. He was then attached to the Ministry of War until in July 1943 he was given command of the 24th Infantry Division Pinerolo, stationed in Greece as an occupation force in the region of Thessaly.

On 8 September 1943 the Armistice of Cassibile was announced, and within a few days, most of the Italian units located in Greece were disarmed and interned by the German troops. One of the few exceptions was the Pinerolo Division; General Infante, thanks to the mediation of a British military mission, established a collaboration agreement with the Greek partisans of ELAS and EDES, and starting from 15 September at least 8,000 men of the division took to the mountains of the Pindus region. The units of the "Pinerolo" were reorganized into the TIMO Regiment ("Italian Troops of Eastern Macedonia"), initially employed in operations against the Germans; starting from the end of October, however, Italian units were progressively disarmed by the Greek partisans and interned in special prison camps, in harsh conditions that resulted in the death of several thousand of Italians. Infante protested harshly with the British mission for the treatment received by his men, but only obtained that the British take charge of the supplies of the internees and that small Italian contingents were used in limited sabotage operations.

Infante's behavior in Greece favorably impressed the British, who in June 1944 repatriated him to Italy to take on the post of Deputy Chief of the General Staff of the Italian Co-Belligerent Army; he was also made aide to crown prince Umberto of Savoy, then Lieutenant-General of the Kingdom of Italy, in 1944-1945. After the war he held the position of Military Attaché at the Italian Embassy in London.

=== Later years ===
After the end of the war, the Greek National Office for War Crimes included Infante in several lists of war criminals whose extradition it intended to request from Italy to try them in Greece. Among other charges, he was accused for the killing on 13 August 1943 of thirty-five civilians in the village of Almyros, in Thessaly. The request was however dropped, along with all those against the Italian military, in 1948, when Greece, under strong Allied pressure, renounced in a secret agreement to prosecute Italians accused of war crimes on its national territory.

Infante, who had also been awarded the titles of Knight of the Military Order of Savoy and Grand Officer of the Order of Merit of the Italian Republic and the Legion of Merit, died in 1970.
