= 23rd Infantry Regiment "Como" =

Inactive Italian Army infantry unit

- 23° Reggimento Fanteria "Como"
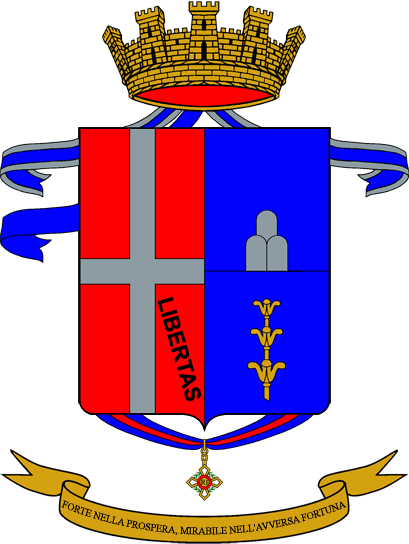
- Regimental coat of arms
- Active: 31 Oct. 1848 – 14 Dec. 1849; 1 Nov. 1859 – 11 Sept. 1943; 1 Sept. 1975 – 15 Oct. 1996
- Country: Italy
- Branch: Italian Army
- Part of: Armored Brigade "Centauro"
- Garrison/HQ: Como
- Mottos: "Forte nella prospera, mirabile nell'avversa fortuna"
- Anniversaries: 28 October 1918 – Battle of Santa Lucia di Piave
- Decorations: 1× Military Order of Italy; 2× Silver Medals of Military Valor; 1× Bronze Medal of Military Valor

Insignia
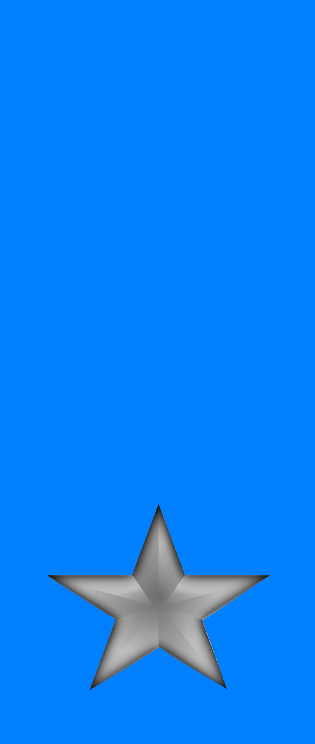
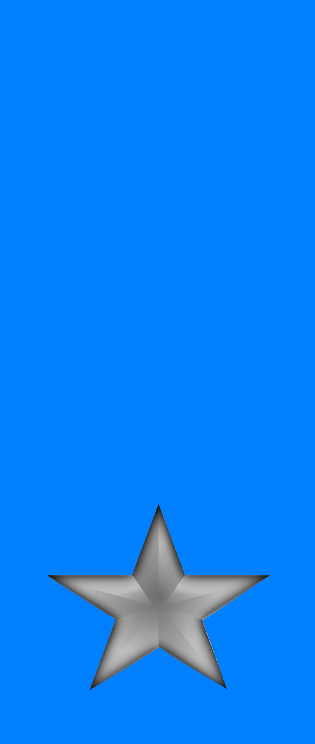
- Regimental gorget patches

The 23rd Infantry Regiment "Como" (Italian: 23° Reggimento Fanteria "Como") is an inactive unit of the Italian Army last based in Como in Lombardy. The regiment is named for the city of Como and part of the Italian Army's infantry arm. The regiment was formed in 1848 by the Royal Sardinian Army during the First Italian War of Independence. After the war the regiment was disbanded. In 1859, the regiment was reformed after the Kingdom of Sardinia annexed Lombardy after the Second Italian War of Independence. In 1866, the regiment fought in the Third Italian War of Independence and in 1911–12 in the Italo-Turkish War. During World War I the regiment fought on the Italian front. During World War II, the regiment was assigned to the 14th Infantry Division "Isonzo", with which it fought in 1941 in the Invasion of Yugoslavia. The division then served on anti-partistan duty in occupied Yugoslavia. After the announcement of the Armistice of Cassibile on 8 September 1943, the division and its regiments were disbanded by invading German forces.

In 1975, the regiment's flag and traditions were assigned to the 23rd Infantry Battalion "Como", which was assigned to the 3rd Army Corps as the army corps' training unit. In 1990, the battalion was transferred to the Mechanized Brigade "Legnano". In 1992, the battalion was renamed 23rd Battalion "Como" and in 1996 transferred to the Armored Brigade "Centauro". The same year the battalion was disbanded and the flag of the 23rd Infantry Regiment "Como" transferred to the Shrine of the Flags in the Vittoriano in Rome. The regiment's anniversary falls on 28 October 1918, the day during the Battle of Vittorio Veneto the 23rd Infantry Regiment, having crossed the Piave river the day before, began the pursuit of the retreating enemy to Santa Lucia di Piave.

== History ==
=== First Italian War of Independence ===
On 12 January 1848, the people of Palermo in Sicily rebelled against the rule of Ferdinand II of the House of Bourbon, King of the Two Sicilies. The Sicilian revolution was the first of the revolutions of 1848. After the news of the February Revolution in Paris, which had led to the abdication of King Louis Philippe on 24 February, reached Turin, the King of Sardinia Charles Albert ordered on 1 March 1848 the mobilization of the Royal Sardinian Army. Initially the King's intention was to use the army against his own citizens, if they would rise against the Savoyard dynasty, but on 18 March 1848, the people of Milan, which was the capital of the Habsburg ruled Kingdom of Lombardy–Venetia, rose up and in five days of fighting drove the Austrian forces out of the city. On 23 March 1848, King Charles Albert declared war on the Austrian Empire in the hope that he could use the rebellions in Lombardy–Venetia to expand his own kingdom. Thus began the First Italian War of Independence.

On 25 and 26 March 1848, two Sardinian advance guards crossed the Ticino (river) Ticino river, which formed the border between the Kingdom of Sardinia and the Austrian Empire. On 29 March, the main body of the Royal Sardinian Army crossed the Ticino river and marched directly towards the Quadrilatero fortresses at Mantua, Peschiera del Garda, Verona, and Legnano, in whose vicinity the First Campaign of the war was fought. On 22–27 July 1848, Sardinia lost the Battle of Custoza and the Battle of Volta Mantovana. On the evening of 27 July, King Charles Albert ordered a retreat towards Milan. By 19h in the evening of 4 August 1848, the Sardinian troops had retreated within the walls of Milan, where one hour later King Charles Albert held a war council, which decided to abandon the city due to a lack of munitions and food. The next morning the Sardinians were informed that the Austrian commander Field Marshal Joseph Radetzky von Radetz had agreed to allow the Sardinians to retreat and by 6 August the Sardinians had left Milan and retreated over the Ticino. With the Sardinian troops also thousands of Milanese civilians and many of the Lombard volunteers, who had enrolled in the provisional Lombard battalions of the Provisional Government of Milan, crossed the Ticino. Three days later, on 9 August, the Austrian General Heinrich von Heß and the Sardinian General Carlo Canera di Salasco signed an armistice, which stated that Charles Albert's troops would withdraw from the whole of the Kingdom of Lombardy–Venetia, and the Duchy of Parma and Piacenza and Duchy of Modena and Reggio, whose rulers would be restored to their thrones. Thus ended the First Campaign of the war.

After the armistice the Austrians sent troops to occupy the duchies of Parma and Piacenza and Duchy of Modena and Reggio, while King Charles Albert began to expand his army with the intent to resume the war at the earliest opportunity. On 31 October 1848, the Royal Sardinian Army formed the 23rd Infantry Regiment with the line infantry units of the Duchy of Parma and Piacenza and the Duchy of Modena and Reggio, which had fought on the Sardinian side in the war's First Campaign. To bring the regiment to full strength recruits from Piedmont were added to the unit.

On 1 March 1849, the Sardinian Chamber of Deputies voted for the resumption of the war, with 94 votes in favour and 24 against. King Charles Albert decided that hostilities would resume on 20 March and, as stipulated in the 1848 armistice, the Austrians were informed about the continuation of the war eight days before the hostilities resumed. At the begin of the Second Campaign of the First Italian War of Independence the 23rd Infantry Regiment was assigned, together with the 17th Infantry Regiment, to the Combined Brigade, which formed, together with the Brigade "Casale", the II Division. When hostilities resumed Charles Albert and the main body of the Royal Sardinian Army was located at Novara, while the Lombard Division was at La Cava guarding the Ticino river crossings at Pavia. However, early on 20 March the Lombard Division crossed the Po river, leaving only the 21st Infantry Regiment at La Cava. At noon on the same day, the whole Austrian Army crossed the Ticino river at Pavia and, even though the 21st Infantry Regiment resisted for six hours, the Austrian Army marched North towards Mortara and Vigevano. Around 13h on 21 March, the II Division arrived at Sforzesca to the South of Vigevano and over the next hours attacked the Austrian 1st Corps three times. The resulting Battle of Sforzesca ended inconclusive, as the Sardinians stopped the Austrian advance at Vigevano, while at the same time the Austrian 2nd Corps defeated the Sardinians in the Battle of Mortara and continued their advance to Novara.

On 22–23 March 1849, during the Battle of Novara, the II Division was in the center of the Sardinian line, but the battle resulted in a decisive defeat of the Sardinian forces. On the evening of 23 March 1849, King Charles Albert abdicated in favour of his son Victor Emmanuel. On 24 March, the new king met with Radetzky at Vignale and agreed to an armistice, which ended the short Second Campaign of the First Italian War of Independence. On 13 July 1849, King Victor Emmanuel II awarded a Silver Medal of Military Valor to the 23rd Infantry Regiment for the regiment's conduct and bravery the battles of Sforzesca and Novara. Nonetheless the 23rd Infantry Regiment was disbanded on 14 December 1849 and its personnel distributed among the regiments of the Brigade "Acqui" and the army's Bersaglieri battalions.

=== Second Italian War of Independence ===
In fall 1859, after the Second Italian War of Independence, the armies of the Second French Empire and the Kingdom of Sardinia occupied Lombard part of the Kingdom of Lombardy–Venetia, as well as the Duchy of Modena and Reggio, the Duchy of Parma and Piacenza, and the Papal Legations of the Romagne. On 1 November 1859, the Royal Sardinian Army formed eight new infantry regiments to garrison the occupied territories. Each existing infantry regiment, with the exception of the 1st Infantry Regiment and 2nd Infantry Regiment of the Brigade "Re", ceded its III Battalion and three depot companies with recruits, to help form the new infantry regiments. Consequently on 1 November 1859, the 11th Infantry Regiment and 12th Infantry Regiment of the Brigade "Casale" ceded their III Battalion and three depot companies to form the 23rd Infantry Regiment, while the 13th Infantry Regiment and 14th Infantry Regiment of the Brigade "Pinerolo" ceded their III Battalion and three depot companies to form the 24th Infantry Regiment. On the same day the Brigade "Como" was formed in Alessandria and the 23rd and 24th infantry regiments assigned to it. The Silver Medal of Military Valor, which had been awarded to the 23rd Infantry Regiment in 1849, was affixed to the reformed regiment's flag. The brigade was then sent to garrison the cities of Parma and Modena.

On 1 March 1860, the 23rd Infantry Regiment ceded one company to help form the 27th Infantry Regiment (Brigade "Pavia"), while the 24th Infantry Regiment ceded one company to help form the 28th Infantry Regiment (Brigade "Pavia"). On 5 May 1860, Giuseppe Garibaldi's Expedition of the Thousand set off, with the support of the Sardinian government, from Genoa and landed on 11 May in Marsala in Sicily. On 15 May 1860, Garibaldi won the Battle of Calatafimi and the Sardinian government decided to send reinforcements to Sicily. This triggered the Sardinian campaign in central and southern Italy, durich which the Brigade "Como", together with the Brigade "Bergamo", was assigned to the 7th Division. During the campaign, the Brigade "Como" fought in the Battle of Castelfidardo, the Siege of Ancona, and the Battle of San Giuliano. The 24th Infantry Regiment also participated in the Siege of Gaeta.

After the successful conclusion of Garibaldi's Expedition of the Thousand the Kingdom of Sardinia annexed the Kingdom of the Two Sicilies and most of the Papal Legations. On 17 March 1861, King Victor Emmanuel II proclaimed himself King of Italy.

=== Third Italian War of Independence ===
On 16 April 1861, the 23rd Infantry Regiment and 24th Infantry Regiment ceded both one battalion to help form the 56th Infantry Regiment (Brigade "Marche"). On 1 August 1862, the 23rd Infantry Regiment and 24th Infantry Regiment ceded both their 17th Company and 18th Company to help form the 64th Infantry Regiment (Brigade "Cagliari"). In 1866, the Brigade "Como" participated in the Third Italian War of Independence.

On 25 October 1871, the brigade level was abolished, and the two regiments of the Brigade "Como" were renamed 23rd Infantry Regiment "Como", respectively 24th Infantry Regiment "Como". On 2 January 1881, the brigade level was reintroduced, and the two regiments were renamed again as 23rd Infantry Regiment (Brigade "Como") and 24th Infantry Regiment (Brigade "Como"). On 1 November 1884, the 23rd Infantry Regiment and 24th Infantry Regiment ceded some of their companies to help form the 87th Infantry Regiment (Brigade "Friuli"). In 1895–96, the regiment provided 13 officers and 276 enlisted for units deployed to Italian Eritrea for the First Italo-Ethiopian War.

=== Italo-Turkish War ===
In 1911, the 23rd Infantry Regiment was deployed to Libya for the Italo-Turkish War. On 26 November 1911, the regiment's II Battalion took the Turkish fort at Mesri to the South of Tripoli, for which the 23rd Infantry Regiment was awarded a Bronze Medal of Military Valor, which was affixed to the regiment's flag and added to the regiment's coat of arms. On 4 December 1911, the regiment fought in the Battle of Ain Zara and on 8 June 1912, in the Battle of Zanzur. On 20 September 1912, the regiment fought in the Battle of Sidi Bilal. In 1913, the regiment remained in Libya and fought against local rebels.

=== World War I ===
At the outbreak of World War I, the Brigade "Como" formed, together with the Brigade "Umbria" and the 17th Field Artillery Regiment, the 2nd Division. At the time the 23rd Infantry Regiment consisted of three battalions, each of which fielded four fusilier companies and one machine gun section. On 10 January 1915, the depot of the 23rd Infantry Regiment in Novara began with the formation of the command of the Brigade "Novara" and the 153rd Infantry Regiment for the new brigade, while on 20 January 1915 the depot of the 67th Infantry Regiment (Brigade "Palermo") in Como began with the formation of the 154th Infantry Regiment. On 1 March 1915, the Brigade "Novara" was formally activated. On 24 May 1915, the day after Italy's entry into the war, the Brigade "Como" was in the Cadore area at the beginning of the Boite valley, through which it advanced towards Cortina d’Ampezzo, which was occupied on 29 May 1915. The brigade then advanced to the ruined Botestagno Castle, beyond which the brigade encountered the first Austro-Hungarian Army fortifications. On 19 July 1915, the 23rd Infantry Regiment's IV Battalion participated in the capture of the Southern summit of Monte Piana. In October and November 1915, the brigade participated in two unsuccessful attempts to take Punta del Forame in the Monte Cristallo massif. On 10 December 1915, the depot of the 23rd Infantry Regiment in Novara formed the 202nd Infantry Regiment, which on 3 April 1916 was assigned to the newly formed Brigade "Sesia".

In 1916, the Brigade "Como" remained in the Cadore sector, while the 23rd Infantry Regiment was transferred in June 1916 to the upper Cismon valley from where the Italian troops tried to fight their way across the Lagorai mountain range to reach the Fiemme valley. In February 1917, the 23rd Infantry Regiment returned to the brigade, which was still in the Cadore sector. The 23rd Infantry Regiment then held the front from the Tre Cime di Lavaredo to the Sextener Rotwand, while the 24th Infantry Regiment held the front from the Sextener Rotwand to the Kreuzberg Pass. On 12 May 1917, the depot of the 23rd Infantry Regiment in Novara formed the 163rd Infantry Regiment with battalions ceded by the 35th Infantry Regiment (Brigade "Pistoia"), 35th Infantry Regiment (Brigade "Pistoia"), and 153rd Infantry Regiment (Brigade "Novara"). The regiment was initially assigned as third regiment to the Brigade "Pistoia", but on 25 July 1917 the regiment was transferred to the newly formed Brigade "G", which on 7 August was renamed Brigade "Lucca".

On 24 October 1917, Austro-Hungarian forces, reinforced by German units, commenced the Battle of Caporetto. The German forces were able to break into the Italian front line at Caporetto and rout the Italian forces opposing them, which forced the Italian armies along the Isonzo river and in the Julian Alps to retreat behind the Piave river. In the night between 3 and 4 November 1917, the Brigade "Como" began the retreat to the new lines. On 11 November, the brigade arrived in Quero on the Piave river, from where the new Italian frontline rose up to the Monte Grappa massif. The brigade entered the new line between Monte Fontana Secca and Quero and came immediately under enemy attack. On 13 November, Austro-Hungarian troops crossed the Piave river at Vas and attacked the flanks of the Brigade "Como". On 17 November, the brigade, which had lost more than 3,100 men since 11 November, fell back to a new line between Monte Tomba and Monfenera. On 5 December 1917, the remnants of the brigade, which in the preceding days had lost another 1,000 men, was sent to the rear to be rebuilt.

On 19 December 1917, the Brigade "Como" returned to the front, taking up positions on Monte Solarolo. On 15 June 1918, the Austro-Hungarian forces began the Second Battle of the Piave River with a four hour bombardment of the lines held by the Brigade "Como" with chemical weapons. Over the next days the brigade held most of its positions on the line from Col dell'Orso to Monte Solarolo and Monte Valderoa at the cost of more than 1,600 men. In October 1918, during the decisive Battle of Vittorio Veneto, the brigade was deployed on the Piave river, which it crossed at Grave di Papadopoli from 27 to 28 October. The brigade then advanced to Santa Lucia di Piave and then Villa di Villa. The brigade then pursued the retreating enemy to the Tagliamento river and on 4 November 1918 liberated San Daniele del Friuli.

For its conduct during the war, especially at Quero, and during the Second Battle of the Piave River and the Battle of Vittorio Veneto, the 23rd Infantry Regiment was awarded a Silver Medal of Military Valor, which was affixed to the regiment's flag and added to its coat of arms.

=== Interwar years ===
In 1920, the 24th Infantry Regiment moved from Novara to the newly annexed city of Gorizia, followed one year later by the 23rd Infantry Regiment, which moved from Novara to Gradisca d'Isonzo. In 1922, the 23rd Infantry Regiment joined the 24th Infantry Regiment in Gorizia. In October 1926, the Brigade "Como" was renamed XIV Infantry Brigade. The brigade was the infantry component of the 14th Territorial Division of Gorizia, which also included the 6th Field Artillery Regiment. At the same time the brigade's two infantry regiments were renamed 23rd Infantry Regiment "Como" and 24th Infantry Regiment "Como". On 15 October 1926, the Brigade "Acqui" was disbanded and the 17th Infantry Regiment "Acqui" in Gradisca d'Isonzo joined the XIV Infantry Brigade.

In 1933, the 24th Infantry Regiment "Como" moved from Gorizia to Postojna. In 1934, the 14th Territorial Division of Gorizia changed its name to 14th Infantry Division "Isonzo". A name change that also extended to the division's infantry brigade. In 1935, the 17th Infantry Regiment "Acqui" moved from Gradisca d'Isonzo to Cormons. In 1935–36, the 23rd Infantry Regiment "Como" provided six officers and 315 troops to units deployed to East Africa for the Second Italo-Ethiopian War. In 1938, the 17th Infantry Regiment "Acqui" left the XIV Infantry Brigade "Isonzo" and moved from Cormons to Schlanders in preparation for the formation of the 33rd Infantry Division "Acqui" in August 1939. On 10 August 1938, the 23rd Infantry Regiment "Como" and 24th Infantry Regiment "Como" were granted the privilege to wear an azure colored tie to honor the two regiments glorious military traditions.

On 24 May 1939, the XIV Infantry Brigade "Isonzo" was disbanded and the 23rd and 24th infantry regiments came under direct command of the "Isonzo" division. Furthermore, the 23rd Infantry Regiment "Como" and 24th Infantry Regiment "Como" were renamed 23rd Infantry Regiment "Isonzo" respectively 24th Infantry Regiment "Isonzo", while the 6th Field Artillery Regiment was renamed 6th Artillery Regiment "Isonzo".<

=== World War II ===
At the outbreak of World War II, the 23rd Infantry Regiment "Isonzo" consisted of a command, a command company, three fusilier battalions, a support weapons battery equipped with 65/17 infantry support guns, and a mortar company equipped with 81mm Mod. 35 mortars. On 6 April 1941, the invasion of Yugoslavia began and the 14th Infantry Division "Isonzo" crossed the Italo-Yugoslav border near Gorizia, from where it advanced to Brezovica. On 11 April 1940, the division reached the Golovec District. In January 1942, the division participated in large battles against Yugoslav partisans in Bosnia. In 1943, the "Isonzo" division fought a series of battles against the increasing number of partisans in Slovenia. After the announcement of the Armistice of Cassibile on 8 September 1943, the division marched from Novo Mesto to Rijeka, but en route the division was overcome and disbanded near Kočevje on 11 September 1943 by the invading German forces.

=== Cold War ===
During the 1975 army reform the army disbanded the regimental level and newly independent battalions were granted for the first time their own flags. On 1 September 1975, the II Battalion of the 68th Infantry Regiment "Legnano" in Como became an autonomous unit and was renamed 23rd Infantry Battalion "Como". The battalion was assigned to the 3rd Army Corps and trained the recruits destined for the army corps' support units. On 29 October 1975, the 21st Infantry Regiment "Cremona" was disbanded. The next day, on 30 October 1975, the regiment's III Battalion in Asti was reorganized as a detachment of the 23rd Infantry Battalion "Como". On 12 November 1976, the President of the Italian Republic Giovanni Leone assigned with decree 846 the flag and traditions of the 23rd Infantry Regiment "Como" to the 23rd Mechanized Infantry Battalion "Como". On 1 March 1977, the detachment of the 23rd Infantry Battalion "Como" in Asti became an autonomous unit and was renamed 4th Infantry Battalion "Guastalla".

=== Recent times ===
On 5 November 1990, the 23rd Infantry Battalion "Como" was transferred from the 3rd Army Corps to the Mechanized Brigade "Legnano". In 1992, the battalion was renamed 23rd Battalion "Como". On 27 September 1996, the battalion was transferred to the Armored Brigade "Centauro", but on the following 15 October the battalion was disbanded and three days later, on 18 October 1996, the flag of the 23rd Infantry Regiment "Como" was transferred to the Shrine of the Flags in the Vittoriano in Rome.
