= 17th Volunteer Training Regiment "Acqui" =

Active Italian Army training unit

- 17° Reggimento Addestramento Volontari "Acqui"
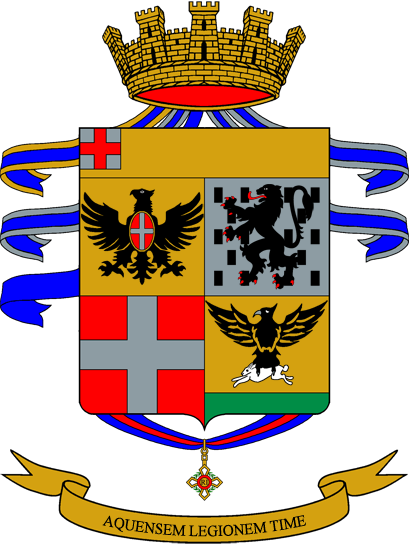
- Regimental coat of arms
- Active: 27 Oct. 1703 – 9 Dec. 1798; July 1814 – 31 May 1821; 19 Dec. 1821 – 25 Sept. 1943; 1 Jan. 1948 – 1 Dec. 1990; 1 March 1991 – today
- Country: Italy
- Branch: Italian Army
- Part of: Infantry School
- Garrison/HQ: Capua
- Motto: "Aquensem legionem time"
- Anniversaries: 25 September 1943 – End of the Battle of Cephalonia
- Decorations: 1× Military Order of Italy; 1× Gold Medal of Military Valor; 3× Silver Medals of Military Valor; 1× Bronze Medal of Military Valor; 1× Italian Red Cross Gold Medal of Merit

Insignia
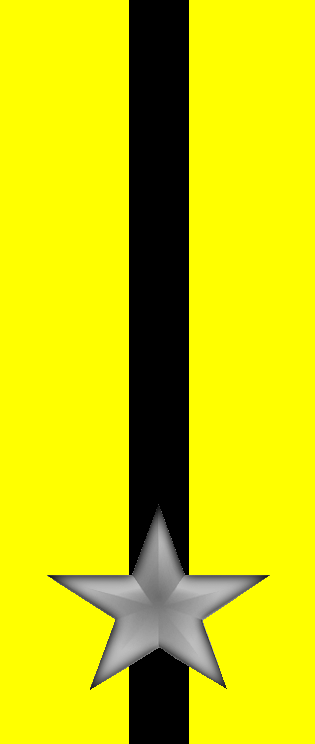
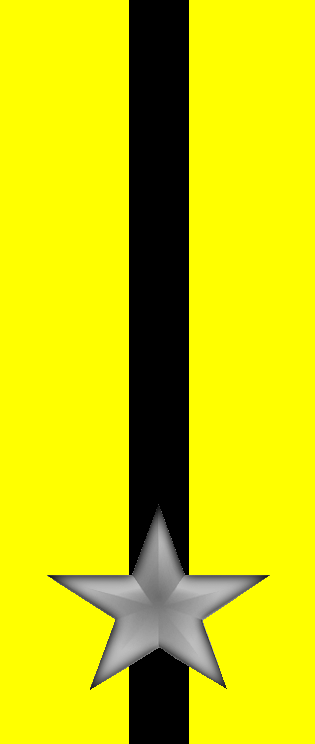
- Regimental gorget patches

The 17th Volunteer Training Regiment "Acqui" (Italian: 17° Reggimento Addestramento Volontari "Acqui") is an active unit of the Italian Army based in Capua in Campania. The regiment is named for the city of Acqui and was originally part of the Italian Army's infantry arm until it became a training unit and was redesignated as a "multi-arms unit" in 2004. The regiment was formed on 19 December 1821 by the Royal Sardinian Army as Brigade of "Acqui", with the troops of the Brigade of "Alessandria", who had remained loyal during the revolt in Piedmont in spring 1821 and were retained in service after the Brigade of "Alessandria" was disbanded on 31 May 1821. Later the Royal Italian Army allowed the two regiments of the Brigade "Acqui" to claim the traditions and honors of the Brigade of "Alessandria", for which reason the regiment's founding is today considered to be 27 October 1703.

The Regiment Desportes was formed in 1703 and fought in the War of the Spanish Succession, War of the Polish Succession, and War of the Austrian Succession. In 1774, the regiment was renamed Regiment of Chablais. In 1792 the regiment fought in the War of the First Coalition against the French Republic. In 1796, the regiment was renamed Regiment of "Alessandria". In December 1798, French troops occupied Piedmont, forced King Charles Emmanuel IV into exile, and formed the Piedmontese Republic, a French client-state. Part of the regiment's personnel was then assigned to the 2nd Line Brigade, which fought on the French side in the War of the Second Coalition against the Austrians. In May 1814 King Victor Emmanuel I returned from exile in Sardinia and in July of the same year the Regiment of "Alessandria" was reformed. One year later the 15 militia regiments of the Kingdom of Sardinia were disbanded and their battalions assigned as reserve units to the army's regular regiments. Consequently, on 1 November 1815, the Regiment of "Alessandria" was renamed Brigade of "Alessandria".

In March 1821 most of the brigade's personnel participated, with the troops of three other infantry brigades and three cavalry regiments, in a revolt against King Victor Emmanuel I, who abdicated in favor of his brother Charles Felix. After the revolt Charles Felix had the four infantry brigades and three cavalry regiments disbanded. The troops of the Brigade of "Alessandria", who had remained loyal during the revolt, were used to form the new Brigade of "Acqui" on 19 December 1821. On the same date, the personnel of the other three brigades, which had remained loyal, was used to form the new brigades "Casale", "Pinerolo", and "Savona". The seniority of the four new brigades was determined by drawing lots.

In 1831, the brigade was renamed Brigade "Acqui" and split into two regiments, which in 1839 were designated 17th Infantry Regiment (Brigade "Acqui") and 18th Infantry Regiment (Brigade "Acqui"). In 1848–49, the regiment participated in the First Italian War of Independence, and in 1855–56 four of the regiment's companies fought in the Crimean War. In 1859, the regiment participated in the Second Italian War of Independence and in 1866 in the Third Italian War of Independence. During World War I, the regiment fought on the Italian front. During World War II, the regiment was assigned to the 33rd Infantry Division "Acqui", with which it fought in the Greco-Italian War. In May 1943, the "Acqui" division was sent to garrison the Greek islands of Cephalonia and Corfu. After the announcement of the Armistice of Cassibile on 8 September 1943, the "Acqui" division refused German demands to surrender and fought attacking German forces until the division's ammunition was exhausted on 22 September. In the following three days Wehrmacht troops murdered most of the "Acqui" division's personnel in the Cephalonia massacre.

In 1948, the regiment was reformed in Rome and assigned to the Infantry Division "Granatieri di Sardegna". In 1975, the regiment was disbanded and its flag and traditions assigned to the 17th Infantry Battalion "San Martino", which trained recruits destined for the Motorized Brigade "Acqui". In December 1990, the battalion was reduced to a reserve unit. The following March the battalion was reformed as 17th Motorized Infantry Battalion "San Martino". In 1992, the battalion lost its autonomy and entered the reformed 17th Infantry Regiment "Acqui". In 1995, the regiment became a training unit, which in 2004 was assigned to the Training Units Grouping. The regiment's anniversary falls on 25 September 1943, the last day of fighting on the island of Cephalonia, for which the regiments of the 33rd Infantry Division "Acqui" were awarded Italy's highest military honor the Gold Medal of Military Valor.

== History ==
=== Cabinet Wars ===
In 1701, Duke Victor Amadeus II of Savoy joined the War of the Spanish Succession and on 27 October 1703, the Regiment Desportes was formed with personnel recruited in various European nations for the war. The regiment was named after its first owner and commander Colonel Ludovic Desportes. The regiment consisted of one grenadier company and twelve fusilier companies, which were grouped into two battalions. During the War of the Spanish Succession the regiment fought in 1705 in the Defense of Chivasso and then in 1706 in the Defense of Turin. In 1713, the war ended with the Peace of Utrecht, which transferred the Kingdom of Sicily and parts of the Duchy of Milan to Savoy. In October 1713 Victor Amadeus II and his wife, Anne Marie d'Orléans, travelled from Nice to Palermo, where on 24 December 1713 they were crowned in the cathedral of Palermo King and Queen of Sicily.

In July 1718, the Kingdom of Spain landed troops on Sicily and tried to recover the Kingdom of Sicily from Savoy rule. On 2 August 1718, Britain, France, Austria, and the Dutch Republic formed an alliance to defeat Spain in the War of the Quadruple Alliance, during which the Regiment Desportes remained in Piedmont. The war ended with the 1720 Treaty of The Hague, which restored the position prior to 1717, but with Savoy and Austria exchanging Sardinia and Sicily. In 1733, King Charles Emmanuel III joined the War of the Polish Succession on the French-Spanish side. In 1734, the regiment fought in the Battle of San Pietro and the Battle of Guastalla against Austrian forces. In 1739, Colonel Desportes died and the regiment passed to Pierre Audibert, who renamed it Regiment Audibert. In 1742, King Charles Emmanuel III joined the War of the Austrian Succession on the Austrian side and the Regiment Audibert fought in 1743 in the First Battle of Casteldelfino, in 1744 in the Second Battle of Casteldelfino and the Battle of Madonna dell'Olmo, and in 1747 in the Battle of Assietta.

In 1748, the regiment passed to Jean du Monfort de Varache and was renamed Regiment Monfort. In 1769, the regiment passed to Eugene Alexander de Sury and was renamed Regiment de Sury. In 1774, King Victor Amadeus III allowed the regiment to recruit among his subjects in the Duchy of Chablais and the regiment was renamed Regiment of "Chablais". In October of the same year the regiment also formed a third battalion with five fusilier companies from the disbanded Regiment Fatio.

=== French Revolutionary Wars ===
On 21 September 1792, French forces invaded the Duchy of Savoy and on 29 September the County of Nice. Due to these unprovoked attacks King Victor Amadeus III joined the War of the First Coalition against the French Republic. In January 1794, the Regiment of "Chablais", which by then consisted only of soldiers recruited in the territories of King Victor Amadeus III, was taken into national service. In March 1796, Napoleon Bonaparte arrived in Italy and took command of the French forces, with which he defeated the Royal Sardinian Army in the Montenotte campaign within a month. On 28 April 1796, King Victor Amadeus III had to sign the Armistice of Cherasco and on 15 May 1796 the Treaty of Paris, which forced Sardinia out of the First Coalition.

On 26 October 1796, the regiment was renamed Regiment of "Alessandria" for the city of Alessandria. In fall of 1798, France invaded the remaining territories of King Charles Emmanuel IV. On 6 December 1798, French forces occupied Turin and on 8 December 1798 Charles Emmanuel IV was forced to sign a document of abdication, which also ordered his former subjects to recognise French laws and his troops to obey the orders of the French Army. Charles Emmanuel IV went into exile on Sardinia, while his former territories became the Piedmontese Republic. On 9 December 1798, the Sardinian troops were released from their oath of allegiance to the King and sworn to the Piedmontese Republic. Part of the personnel of the Regiment of "Alessandria" choose to remain in service and were assigned to the 2nd Line Brigade, which fought on the French side in the War of the Second Coalition against the Austrians. On 5 April 1799, the Austrians won the Battle of Magnano and the French were forced out of Italy. With the French retreat the Piedmontese Republic dissolved and all of the republic's regiments were disbanded in May 1799.

=== Restoration ===
On 6 April 1814, Emperor Napoleon abdicated and on 11 April the winners of the War of the Sixth Coalition exiled him to the island of Elba. On 20 May 1814, King Victor Emmanuel I returned from exile in Sardinia to Turin. On 24 May 1814, Victor Emmanuel I ordered to reform the regiments disbanded in 1799, including the Regiment of "Alessandria". Each regiment consisted of a staff, and two battalions, both of which fielded one grenadier company, four fusilier companies, and one Jäger company. On 27 June 1814, King Victor Emmanuel I ordered that the 15 provincial militia regiments should be reformed with the same organization as the regular regiments. On 26 February 1815, Napoleon escaped from Elba and landed on 1 March 1815 in Golfe-Juan in France. This triggered the War of the Seventh Coalition, which Sardinia joined against France. The 1st Battalion of the Regiment of "Alessandria", together with the first battalions of all other Sardinian regiments, fought in the Hundred Days campaign, while the regiment's 2nd Battalion, together with the second battalions of all other Sardinian regiments, remained in Piedmont on garrison duty.

In October 1815, the provincial regiments were disbanded and their battalions assigned to the regular regiments as reserve battalions. The Regiment of "Alessandria" received the 2nd Battalion of the Provincial Regiment of "Casale" and both battalions of the Provincial Regiment of "Acqui". Consequently, on 1 November 1815, the regiment was renamed Brigade of "Alessandria". Each brigade consisted of two battalions in peacetime and four reserve battalions, which would be mobilized in wartime. The battalions had a strength of 789 men and consisted of a staff, a grenadier company, and six fusilier companies. At the same time the battalion's Jäger companies were used to form independent light infantry battalions. The brigade's peacetime organizations was then as follows.

- Brigade of "Alessandria"
  - Regimental Staff
  - 1st Battalion
    - 1st Grenadier Company
    - 1st Division, consisting of the 1st and 3rd fusilier companies
    - 2nd Division, consisting of the 5th and 7th fusilier companies
    - 3rd Division, consisting of the 9th and 11th fusilier companies
  - 2nd Battalion
    - 2nd Grenadier Company
    - 1st Division, consisting of the 2nd and 4th fusilier companies
    - 2nd Division, consisting of the 6th and 8th fusilier companies
    - 3rd Division, consisting of the 10th and 12th fusilier companies

The brigade was assigned the provinces of Acqui, Lomellina, Alessandria, and Alba as recruiting zone. On 9 October 1819, King Victor Emmanuel I ordered to reduce the number of troops per battalion to 600 men, while adding two additional reserve battalions to each regiment.

=== Revolt of 1821 ===
After returning from exile King Victor Emmanuel I abolished all the freedoms granted by the Napoleonic Code and established a fiercely oppressive rule. The widespread resentment of this kind of rule led in March 1821 to a liberal revolt in Piedmont. Four infantry brigades (Brigade of "Monferrato", Brigade of "Saluzzo", Brigade of "Alessandria", Brigade of "Genova") and three cavalry regiments (Regiment "Dragoni del Re", Regiment "Dragoni della Regina", Regiment "Cavalleggeri del Re") sided with the revolutionaries against Victor Emmanuel I, who, on 13 March 1821, abdicated in favor of his brother Charles Felix. Charles Felix asked for Austrian troops to help suppress the revolt. On 8 April 1815, the rebellious units were dispersed by a joint Austro-Sardinian army near Novara.

On 31 May 1821, the four infantry brigades, which had sided with the revolutionaries, were stricken from the rolls of the Royal Sardinian Army and their personnel dismissed from service, while the troops of the stricken brigades, who had not participated in the revolt, were assigned to four provisional line battalions. The troops of the Brigade of "Alessandria", who remained in service, were assigned to the 3rd Provisional Line Battalion, while the remaining troops of the Brigade of "Monferrato" were assigned to the 1st Provisional Line Battalion, the troops of the Brigade of "Saluzzo" to the 2nd Provisional Line Battalion, and the troops of the Brigade of "Genova" to the 4th Provisional Line Battalion. On 19 December 1821, the four provisional line battalions were used to form four new infantry brigades:

- Brigade of "Casale": formed with the 1st Provisional Line Battalion and the Italian Jäger Battalion
- Brigade of "Pinerolo": formed with the 2nd Provisional Line Battalion and the 2nd Battalion of the Royal Light Legion
- Brigade of "Acqui": formed with the 3rd Provisional Line Battalion and the 3rd Battalion of the Royal Light Legion
- Brigade of "Savona": formed with the 4th Provisional Line Battalion and a battalion of new recruits

The order of precedence of the battalions within the brigades, as well as the seniority and thus the order of precedence of the four new brigades, was determined by drawing lots. The result ranked the Brigade of "Casale" as the oldest, the Brigade of "Pinerolo" as the second oldest, the Brigade of "Savona" as the third oldest, and the Brigade of "Acqui" as the youngest of the new brigades.

=== Reforms of 1830, 1831, and 1839 ===
On 1 December 1830, the Royal Sardinian Army's infantry brigades were reorganized. Each brigade consisted afterwards of a staff and five battalions: a grenadier battalion with four grenadier companies, two fusilier battalions with six fusilier companies per battalion, a Jäger battalion with four Jäger companies, and a depot battalion with six fusilier companies. The latter six fusilier companies consisted in peacetime only of training personnel, which in wartime would have trained the recruits destined to reinforce the brigade's fusilier battalions. Each brigade consisted in peacetime of 105 officers and 2,990 enlisted, which would have increased to 4,069 troops in wartime.

On 25 October 1831, the Royal Sardinian Army's infantry brigades were reorganized once more: each brigade added two regimental commands, which were numbered 1st Regiment and 2nd Regiment. Each regiment consisted of two battalions in peacetime and three battalions in wartime. Each battalion consisted of four fusilier companies, a grenadier company, and a Jäger company. The Brigade "Acqui" then consisted of the 1st Regiment (Brigade "Acqui") and 2nd Regiment (Brigade "Acqui"). On 9 June 1832, the regiment's third battalions were reorganized as depot battalions. On 4 May 1839, the regiments were renamed infantry regiment and renumbered by seniority from 1 to 18. The two regiments of the Brigade "Acqui" were now designated 17th Infantry Regiment (Brigade "Acqui") and 18th Infantry Regiment (Brigade "Acqui"). Each regiment consisted of the I and II battalions with one grenadier company and three fusilier companies per battalion, the III Battalion with four Jäger companies, and the IV Battalion, which was a depot battalion with four fusilier companies.

=== First Italian War of Independence ===
In 1848–49, the 17th Infantry Regiment (Brigade "Acqui") participated in the First Italian War of Independence, fighting in 1848 in the Siege of Mantua, the Battle of Santa Lucia, the Battle of Goito, the Battle of Volta Mantovana, and the Defense of Milan. In 1849, the regiment fought in the Battle of Sforzesca and the Battle of Novara. On 23 March 1849, after being defeated in the Battle of Novara, King Charles Albert abdicated in favour of his son Victor Emmanuel. On 24 March, the new king met with the Austrian Field Marshal Radetzky at Vignale and agreed to an armistice, which ended the First Italian War of Independence. For its conduct in the battles of Sforzesca and Novara the 17th Infantry Regiment was awarded a Silver Medal of Military Valor, which was also affixed to the regiment's flag. On 12 October 1849, the Royal Sardinian Army's 18 infantry regiments were reorganized and then consisted of a staff and three battalions of four fusilier companies per battalion. In April 1850, each regiment added a fourth battalion with four fusilier companies.

In 1855, the first company of each of the regiment's four battalions, namely the 1st, 5th, 9th and 13th Company, were assigned to the 3rd Battalion of the 5th Provisional Regiment, which was part of the Sardinian Expeditionary Corps in the Crimean War. In Crimea the battalion fought in the Battle of the Chernaya and then participated in the Siege of Sevastopol.

=== Second Italian War of Independence ===
In 1859, the 17th Infantry Regiment (Brigade "Acqui") participated in the Second Italian War of Independence. The regiment initially demonstrated along the Sesia river's confluence with the Po river near Frassineto, while the Royal Sardinian Army crossed the Sesia on 29 and 30 May 1859 at Vercelli. The regiment then joined with the main body of the army. On 24 June 1859, the regiment fought in the Battle of Solferino, during which it distinguished itself at San Martino. For its conduct at San Martino the regiment was awarded a Silver Medal of Military Valor, which was affixed to the regiment's flag. In fall 1859, the armies of the Second French Empire and the Kingdom of Sardinia occupied Lombard part of the Kingdom of Lombardy–Venetia, as well as the Duchy of Modena and Reggio, the Duchy of Parma and Piacenza, and the Papal Legations of the Romagne. On 1 November 1859, the Royal Sardinian Army formed eight new infantry regiments to garrison the occupied territories. Each existing infantry regiment, with the exception of the 1st Infantry Regiment and 2nd Infantry Regiment of the Brigade "Re", ceded its III Battalion and three depot companies, to help form the new infantry regiments. Consequently, on 1 November 1859, the 17th Infantry Regiment and 18th Infantry Regiment of the Brigade "Acqui" ceded their III Battalion and three depot companies to form the 26th Infantry Regiment, which on the same day was assigned to the newly formed Brigade "Bergamo".

On 1 March 1860, the 17th Infantry Regiment ceded a company to help form the 27th Infantry Regiment (Brigade "Pavia"), while the 18th Infantry Regiment ceded a company to help form the 28th Infantry Regiment (Brigade "Pavia"). On 5 May 1860, Giuseppe Garibaldi's Expedition of the Thousand set off, with the support of the Sardinian government, from Genoa and landed on 11 May in Marsala in Sicily. On 15 May 1860, Garibaldi won the Battle of Calatafimi and the Sardinian government decided to send reinforcements to Sicily. This triggered the Sardinian campaign in central and southern Italy. After the successful conclusion of Garibaldi's Expedition of the Thousand the Kingdom of Sardinia annexed the Kingdom of the Two Sicilies and most of the Papal Legations. On 17 March 1861, King Victor Emmanuel II proclaimed himself King of Italy.

=== Third Italian War of Independence ===
On 16 April 1861, the 17th Infantry Regiment ceded a battalion to help form the 60th Infantry Regiment (Brigade "Calabria"), while the 18th Infantry Regiment ceded a battalion to help form the 61st Infantry Regiment (Brigade "Sicilia"). On 1 August 1862, the 17th Infantry Regiment and 18th Infantry Regiment ceded both their 17th Company and 18th Company to help form the 69th Infantry Regiment (Brigade "Ancona"). The 17th Infantry Regiment also ceded one of its depot companies to help form the 71st Infantry Regiment (Brigade "Puglie").

From 1862 to 1864, the Brigade "Acqui" was repeatedly deployed to the South of Italy to suppress the anti-Sardinian revolt, which had erupted in Southern Italy after the annexation of the Kingdom of the Two Sicilies. From 1861 to 1862 the 17th Infantry Regiment was based in Catanzaro, while the 18th Infantry Regiment was based in Cosenza. Both regiments then moved to Salerno, where they remained until 1864. In 1866, the Brigade "Acqui" participated in the Third Italian War of Independence. After the war the Brigade "Acqui" moved to Palermo, where it remained until 1868. The 17th Infantry Regiment then moved to Termini Imerese, while the 18th Infantry Regiment then moved to Caltanissetta in the interior of Sicily. In 1869, the brigade moved to Milan.

On 25 October 1871, the brigade level was abolished, and the two regiments of the Brigade "Acqui" were renamed 17th Infantry Regiment "Acqui", respectively 18th Infantry Regiment "Acqui". On 2 January 1881, the brigade level was reintroduced, and the two regiments were renamed again as 17th Infantry Regiment (Brigade "Acqui") and 18th Infantry Regiment (Brigade "Acqui"). On 1 November 1884, the 17th Infantry Regiment ceded some of its companies to help form the 93rd Infantry Regiment (Brigade "Messina"), while the 18th Infantry Regiment ceded some of its companies to help form the 94th Infantry Regiment (Brigade "Messina"). In 1895–96, the regiment provided seven officers and 234 enlisted for units deployed to Italian Eritrea for the First Italo-Ethiopian War. In 1911–12, the regiment provided 20 officers and 1,203 enlisted for units deployed to Libya for the Italo-Turkish War.

=== World War I ===
At the outbreak of World War I, the Brigade "Acqui" formed, together with the Brigade "Pinerolo" and the 18th Field Artillery Regiment, the 14th Division. At the time the 17th Infantry Regiment consisted of three battalions, each of which fielded four fusilier companies and one machine gun section. On 1 March 1915, the depot of the 18th Infantry Regiment in Chieti formed the command of the Brigade "Chieti" and the 123rd Infantry Regiment for the new brigade, while the depot of the 13th Infantry Regiment (Brigade "Pinerolo") in L'Aquila formed the 124th Infantry Regiment for the new brigade. On 24 May 1915, the day after Italy's entry into the war, the Brigade "Acqui" moved to Tapogliano on the lower Isonzo river, which the brigade crossed on 7 June at Pieris. The brigade then advanced to the foot of the Karst plateau, which blocked the way to the city of Trieste. For the rest of the year the Brigade "Acqui" participated in the Italian attempts to dislodge the Austro-Hungarian forces from the slopes and hills of the Karst plateau. From 23 June to 7 July 1915, during the First Battle of the Isonzo, the brigade attacked towards Monte Sei Busi. Between 18 July and 3 August 1915, during the Second Battle of the Isonzo, the brigade renewed the attack against Monte Sei Busi and the 18th Infantry Regiment managed to advance to the edge of the Austro-Hungarian positions above Vermegliano. During the next months the brigade pushed its trenches forward to establish better attacking positions for the Third Battle of the Isonzo, which began on 18 October 1915. While the 17th Infantry Regiment attacked towards Monte Sei Busi, the 18th Infantry Regiment attacked the Austro-Hungarian trenches above Vermegliano. During these attacks the I Battalion of the 17th Infantry Regiment and the II Battalion of the 18th Infantry Regiment distinguished themselves. However the brigade's attack remained stuck in the enemy's barbed wire and the brigade, which had suffered more than a 1,000 casualties, was sent on 5 November to the rear. On 12 December 1915, the depot of the 18th Infantry Regiment in Chieti formed the 212th Infantry Regiment, which on 16 May 1916 was assigned to the newly formed Brigade "Pescara".

On 21 March 1916, the brigade returned to the first line and on 27 March attacked to clear an Austro-Hungarian trench overlooking the Italian positions at Selz. After two days of combat the trench was take for the loss of more than 250 men. On 22 April 1916, the I Battalion of the 17th Infantry Regiment and the II Battalion of the 18th Infantry Regiment were sent forward to expand the trench taken a month earlier. The next day an Austro-Hungarian counterattack forced the two battalions, which had suffered 600 casualties, to abandon the trench and fall back to the original Italian lines. On 15 May 1916, Austro-Hungarian forces began the Battle of Asiago and the Brigade "Acqui" was sent to the Asiago plateau to reinforce the crumbling Italian front. On 26 May 1916, the brigade attacked the Austro-Hungarian lines at Monte Katz and drove the enemy of the summit the next day. The brigade then attacked unsuccessfully towards Monte Interrotto and Monte Rasta. The attack against the latter two summits was renewed on 11, 12, 13, 22, and 24 July without success. In November 1916, the brigade returned to the lower Isonzo sector and entered the front at Monfalcone. On 12 August 1916, the 18th Infantry Regiment was awarded a Silver Medal of Military Valor for its conduct in the Karst battles in the first two years of the war. The medal was affixed to the regiment's flag and added to its coat of arms.

On 6 February 1917, the depot of the 17th Infantry Regiment in Ascoli Piceno formed the command of the Brigade "Piceno" and the 235th Infantry Regiment for the new brigade, while the depot of the 13th Infantry Regiment (Brigade "Pinerolo") in L'Aquila formed the 236th Infantry Regiment for the new brigade. The same month both infantry regiments of the Brigade "Acqui" ceded two companies to help from the infantry regiments of the newly formed Brigade "Murge". In May 1917, the brigade was kept in reserve during the initial phase of the Tenth Battle of the Isonzo. On 23 May 1917, the battalions of the brigade were sent forward to replace the exhausted battalions of the Brigade "Bologna" on the Karst plateau at Kostanjevica na Krasu. In the following days the brigade attacked, together with the Brigade "Cosenza" and Brigade "Lombardia", towards the hill of Hudi Log. However already after 3 days, the Brigade "Acqui", which had lost 2,000 men in the unsuccessful attack, had to be pulled out of the front and sent to the rear to be rebuilt. On 19 August 1917, during the following Eleventh Battle of the Isonzo, the brigade attacked Austro-Hungarian positions near Kostanjevica na Krasu, but failed to achieve its objectives while losing almost 1,600 men. On 24 August 1917, the brigade was sent to Sagrado in the rear to be rebuilt.

On 24 October 1917, Austro-Hungarian forces, reinforced by German units, commenced the Battle of Caporetto. The German forces were able to break into the Italian front line at Caporetto and rout the Italian forces opposing them, which forced the Italian armies along the Isonzo river and in the Julian Alps to retreat behind the Piave river. At the beginning of the Battle of Caporetto the Brigade "Acqui" manned the first line on the Karst plateau at Kostanjevica na Krasu, which it held for three days until Austro-Hungarian forces broke through on the brigade's left flank and overran and annihilated two battalions of the 17th Infantry Regiment. By nightfall of 29 October, the brigade fell back to Aiello del Friuli. The brigade then crossed the Tagliamento river and took up positions on the river's right bank between Mussons and San Paolo to prevent the Austro-Hungarians from repairing the bridges at Madrisio, which had been blown up on 31 October. On 5 November 1917, the brigade resumed the retreat and on 6 November crossed the Piave river. The brigade then took up positions between Sant'Andrea di Barbarana and Zenson di Piave. On 12 November 1917, Austro-Hungarian forces crossed the Piave river at Zenson and in the afternoon of the same day the 18th Infantry Regiment participated in the counterattack to drive the enemy back across the river. Afterwards the shattered brigade, which had lost nearly 3,000 men – almost half its strength – in the retreat, was sent to the rear to be rebuilt.

On 13 December 1917, the brigade was assigned to the French 65th Infantry Division, which manned the Piave front in the Vidor sector. In February 1918, the brigade left the French 65th Infantry Division and was sent to the Posina valley, where it manned the quiet front sector running from Monte Novegno over Monte Priaforà to Monte Sogli Bianchi. On 1 November 1918, during the decisive Battle of Vittorio Veneto the brigade was sent to Ala as reserve of the XXIX Army Corps, which was pursuing the retreating Austro-Hungarians through the Lagarina Valley. On 3 November 1918, the brigade passed through Rovereto, while the vanguards of the XXIX Army Corps entered Trento the same day. On 4 November 1918, the day the war ended on the Italian front, the Brigade "Acqui" arrived in Trento. For their conduct during the war, the I Battalion of the 17th Infantry Regiment and the II Battalion of the 18th Infantry Regiment were both awarded a Bronze Medal of Military Valor. The two medals were affixed to the two regiments' flags and added to their coat of arms.

=== Interwar years ===
In 1919, the Brigade "Acqui" was initially based in the recently annexed city of Trento. Towards the end of the year the 17th Infantry Regiment moved from Trento to the Rovereto. On 15 October 1926, the Brigade "Acqui" was disbanded and its two infantry regiments were renamed 17th Infantry Regiment "Acqui" and 18th Infantry Regiment "Acqui". On the same day the 17th Infantry Regiment "Acqui" was assigned to the XIV Infantry Brigade, which also included the 23rd Infantry Regiment "Como" and 24th Infantry Regiment "Como", while the 18th Infantry Regiment "Acqui" was assigned to the XI Infantry Brigade, which also included the 231st Infantry Regiment "Avellino" and 232nd Infantry Regiment "Avellino". The XI Infantry Brigade was the infantry component of the 11th Territorial Division of Bolzano, while the XIV Infantry Brigade was the infantry component of the 14th Territorial Division of Gorizia. Consequently, the 17th Infantry Regiment "Acqui" moved from Rovereto to Gradisca d'Isonzo.

In 1934, the 11th Territorial Division of Bolzano changed its name to 11th Infantry Division "Brennero", while the 14th Territorial Division of Gorizia changed its name to 14th Infantry Division "Isonzo". In 1935–36, the 17th Infantry Regiment "Acqui" provided eight officers and 179 troops to units deployed to East Africa for the Second Italo-Ethiopian War. During the same year the regiment moved from Gradisca d'Isonzo to Cormons, while the 18th Infantry Regiment "Acqui" moved from Trento to Brixen in South Tyrol. In 1938, the 17th Infantry Regiment "Acqui" in Cormons and the 50th Infantry Regiment "Parma" in Schlanders switched flags and names. On 15 December 1938, the 18th Infantry Regiment "Acqui" in Brixen and the 231st Infantry Regiment "Avellino" in Meran switched flags and names. In August 1939, the 33rd Infantry Division "Acqui" was formed in Meran and the 17th Infantry Regiment "Acqui", which was based in Schlanders, and 18th Infantry Regiment "Acqui", which was based in Meran, were assigned to the division. On 4 September 1939, the depot of the 9th Artillery Regiment "Brennero" in Bolzano reformed the 33rd Artillery Regiment "Acqui" for the new division. In early 1940, the 33rd Artillery Regiment "Acqui" moved from Bolzano to Meran.

=== World War II ===
At the outbreak of World War II, the 17th Infantry Regiment "Acqui" consisted of a command, a command company, three fusilier battalions, a support weapons battery equipped with 65/17 infantry support guns, and a mortar company equipped with 81mm Mod. 35 mortars. On 10 June 1940, Italy invaded France and the "Acqui" division attacked French forces in the Maddalena Pass-Argentera-Colle del Ferro area. After France surrendered to Germany in the evening of 22 June 1940, the division crossed into French territory on 23 June 1940. Meeting weak opposition the division advanced to La Condamine-Châtelard. On 24 June 1940, the "Acqui" division reached the Ubaye Valley, but at this point the Franco-Italian Armistice came into effect and the division returned to its bases.

==== Greco-Italian War ====
On 6 December 1940, the "Acqui" division was ordered to move to Albania to reinforce the crumbling Italian front in the Greco-Italian War. On 18 December 1940, the division arrived north-west of Vuno in the Himarë municipality and was ordered to reinforce the positions of the 51st Infantry Division "Siena" in the Shushice valley. On 19 December 1940, the "Acqui" division fought against Greek forces trying to capture Vlorë. For the rest of December the division remained in its defensive posture. In January 1941, a bitter fight for the Qafa e Hazërit mountain trail started. The Qafa e Hazërit trail changed hands several times. In early February 1941, the division was pulled back to Smokthinë in the Shushice valley to rest and refill its depleted ranks. In March 1941, the "Acqui" division was again deployed to the front at Kakoz. In the course of the German-led Battle of Greece the "Acqui" division attacked on 14 April 1941 at Bolenë, Horë-Vranisht and Maja e Mesimerit. On 16 April 1941, the Greek Army began an organized retreat and the "Acqui" division took the direct route to the border town of Konispol and then entered the Greek province of Filiates. On 20 April 1941, the "Acqui" division captured Igoumenitsa and Syvota in Greece.

For its conduct and bravery between December 1940 and April 1941, the 17th Infantry Regiment "Acqui" was awarded a Silver Medal of Military Valor, while 18th Infantry Regiment "Acqui" was awarded a Bronze Medal of Military Valor and the 33rd Artillery Regiment "Acqui" a War Cross of Military Valor for their conduct in the campaign. The two medals and the cross were affixed to the three regiments' flags and added to the regiments' respective coats of arms. After the Greek surrender the "Acqui" division remained in Greece as the part of the Axis occupation force. The division was deployed to the islands of Corfu, Lefkada, Zakynthos and Cephalonia. On 1 November 1941, the depot of the 18th Infantry Regiment "Acqui" in Meran formed the 317th Infantry Regiment "Acqui". On 14 November 1941, the newly formed regiment was assigned to the 33rd Infantry Division "Acqui" and in May 1942 the regiment arrived in Greece and reinforced the thinly spread troops of the "Acqui" division. In 1942, the division's headquarter was relocated to Lefkada before moving back to Cephalonia in May 1943.

==== Massacre of the "Acqui" division ====
On 8 September 1943, the Armistice of Cassibile was announced. At the time the 17th Infantry Regiment "Acqui", 317th Infantry Regiment "Acqui", and 33rd Artillery Regiment "Acqui" garrisoned Cephalonia, while the 18th Infantry Regiment "Acqui" was based on Corfu. Left without clear orders from the Italian General Staff, the "Acqui" division's commander General Antonio Gandin negotiated with the Germans, which demanded the division surrender. On 13 September 1943, the Germans attempted to land on Cephalonia, but retreated due to Italian artillery fire. The same night General Gandin polled his units on the course of action the division should take and the division's units voted to resist the Germans. On 15 September 1943, the German Luftwaffe began to bomb Italian positions and German battalions landed on the islands. After several days of fighting, at 11:00 hours on 22 September, Gandin ordered his division, which had lost 1,315 men and run out of ammunition, to surrender. Instead of treating the Italian troops as Prisoners of War the German 1st Mountain Division murdered between 5,200 and 6,000 soldiers of the "Acqui" division. General Gandin and 137 of his officers were shot on 24 September and their bodies discarded at sea.

The massacre of Cephalonia was repeated in Corfu, where the 8,000-strong Italian garrison, including the "Acqui" division's 18th Regiment Infantry Regiment "Acqui", surrendered after a day of heavy fighting to the Germans on 25 September 1943. Over the next two days, all 280 Italian officers on Corfu were executed by the Germans and their bodies discarded at sea. On 25 September 1943, the 33rd Infantry Division "Acqui" ceased to exist. On 16 February 1948, the President of Italy Enrico De Nicola awarded the four regiments of the 33rd Infantry Division "Acqui" Italy's highest military honor, the Gold Medal of Military Valor for their conduct and sacrifice on Cephalonia and Corfu. The medals were affixed to the regiments' flags and added to their coat of arms.

=== Cold War ===
On 1 January 1948, the 17th Infantry Regiment "Acqui" was reformed in Rome. The reformed regiment received the II Battalion and III Battalion of the 5th Infantry Regiment "Aosta" and III Battalion of the 6th Infantry Regiment "Aosta". On 1 April of the same year, the regiment was assigned to the reformed Infantry Division "Granatieri di Sardegna", which also included the 1st Regiment "Granatieri di Sardegna", 46th Infantry Regiment "Reggio", and 13th Field Artillery Regiment. At the time the 17th Infantry Regiment "Acqui" consisted of the following units:

- 17th Infantry Regiment "Acqui", in Rome
  - Command Company
  - I Battalion
  - II Battalion
  - III Battalion
  - Mortar Company, with 107mm M30 mortars
  - Anti-tank Cannons Company, with QF 6-pounder anti-tank guns

On 31 January 1959, the 46th Infantry Regiment "Reggio" was disbanded in Sulmona and its battalions assigned to the 17th Infantry Regiment "Acqui", which moved from Rome to Sulmona and took over disbanded regiment's base.

During the 1975 army reform the army disbanded the regimental level and newly independent battalions were granted for the first time their own flags. On 30 September 1975, the 17th Infantry Regiment "Acqui" and the regiment's II Battalion in Spoleto and III Battalion in Cesano were disbanded. The next day, 1 October 1975, the personnel of the disbanded regiment's command was used to form the command of the newly formed Motorized Brigade "Acqui", while the regiment's I Battalion in Sulmona and IV Mechanized Battalion in L'Aquila became autonomous units. The latter battalion was renamed on the same day 9th Armored Battalion "M.O. Butera". On 1 December 1975, the I Battalion in Sulmona was renamed 17th Infantry Battalion "San Martino", while on 1 January 1976, the materiel of the regiment's disbanded II Battalion in Spoleto was used to form the 130th Motorized Infantry Battalion "Perugia". All three battalions were assigned to the Motorized Brigade "Acqui", which also included the 57th Motorized Infantry Battalion "Abruzzi" in Sora, 48th Field Artillery Group "Taro" in L’Aquila and Logistic Battalion "Acqui" in L'Aquila. The 17th Infantry Battalion "San Martino" was tasked with training the recruits destined for the "Acqui" brigade and was named for the regiment's brave conduct at San Martino during the Battle of Solferino in 1859.

On 12 November 1976, the President of the Italian Republic Giovanni Leone assigned with decree 846 the flag and traditions of the 17th Infantry Regiment "Acqui" to the 17th Infantry Battalion "San Martino".

=== Recent times ===
With the end of the Cold War the Italian Army began to draw down its forces. On 1 December 1990, the 17th Infantry Battalion "San Martino" was reduced to a reserve unit. On 1 March 1991, the flag of the 17th Infantry Regiment "Acqui" arrived in Sora in the base of the 57th Motorized Infantry Battalion "Abruzzi". The same day, the flag of the 57th Motorized Infantry Battalion "Abruzzi" left Sora and the battalion's command and companies were used to reform the 17th Motorized Infantry Battalion "San Martino". The next day, 2 March 1992, the 57th Infantry Battalion "Abruzzi" was reformed as recruits training battalion in Sulmona in the former base of the 17th Infantry Battalion "San Martino".

On 1 October 1991, the battalion was mechanized and renamed 17th Mechanized Infantry Battalion "San Martino". On 24 September 1992, the 17th Mechanized Infantry Battalion "San Martino" lost its autonomy and the next day entered the reformed 17th Infantry Regiment "Acqui" as I Mechanized Battalion. In 1995, the regiment became a training unit and was renamed 17th Regiment "Acqui". The same year, the regiment was transferred from the Mechanized Brigade "Acqui" to the army's Non-Commissioned Officers School in Viterbo. On 1 April 2004, the 17th Regiment "Acqui" moved from Sora to Capua. In Capua the regiment shared a base with the 47th Regiment "Ferrara". Both regiments were tasked with training the army's volunteer troops. On 8 October 2004, the two regiment's were assigned to the newly formed Training Units Grouping and were renamed 17th Volunteer Training Regiment "Acqui", respectively 47th Volunteer Training Regiment "Ferrara". In 2015, the 47th Volunteer Training Regiment "Ferrara" was disbanded and its battalion transferred to the 17th Volunteer Training Regiment "Acqui".

== Organization ==
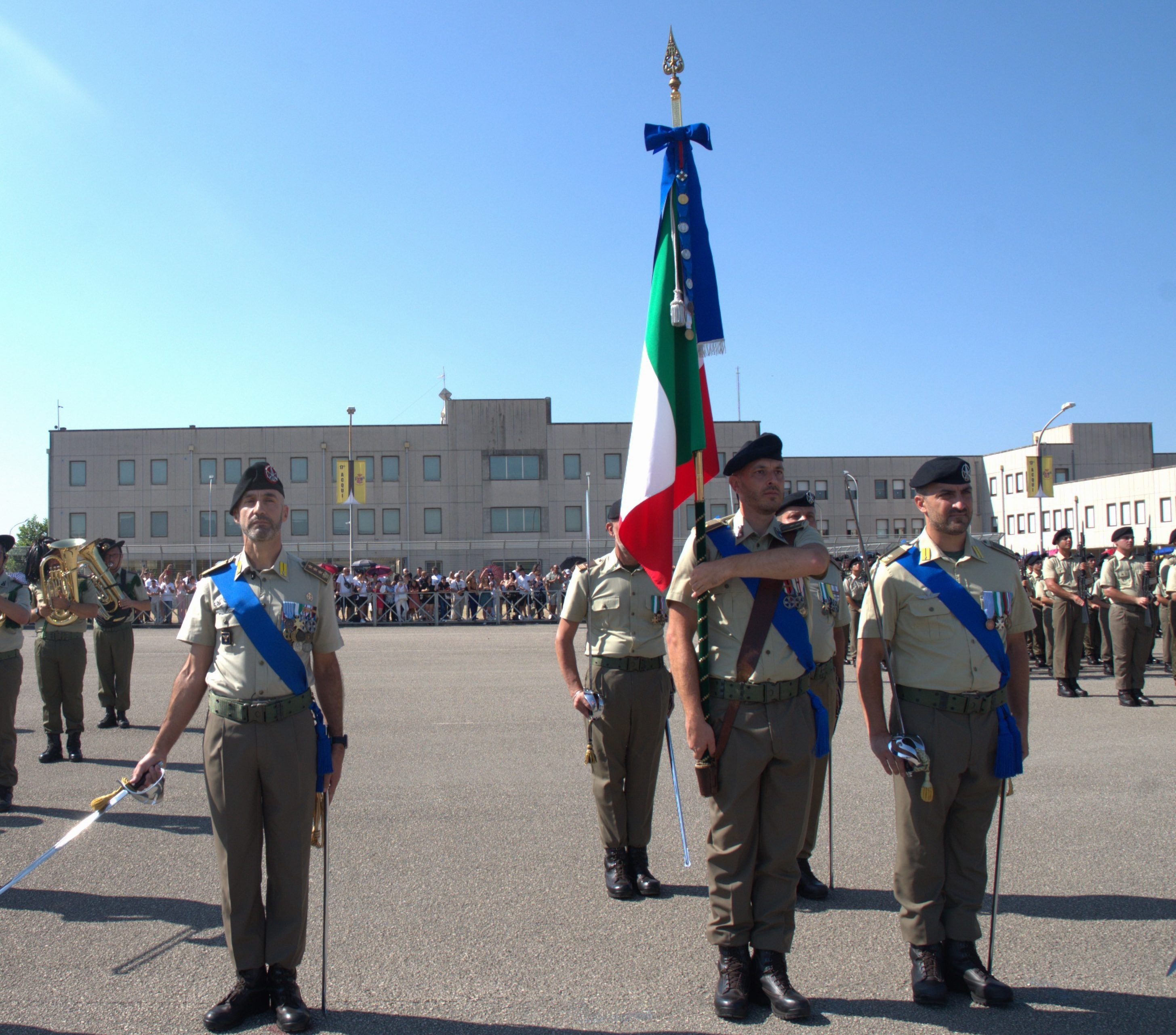
The flag of the 17th Volunteer Training Regiment "Acqui" on parade in July 2024

As of 2024 the 17th Volunteer Training Regiment "Acqui" is organized as follows:

- 17th Volunteer Training Regiment "Acqui", in Capua
  - Command and Logistic Support Company
  - 1st Training Battalion
    - 1st Company
    - 2nd Company
    - 3rd Company
  - 2nd Training Battalion
    - 4th Company
    - 5th Company
    - 6th Company
