= III Army Corps (Italy) =

3º Corpo d'armata 3rd Army Corps
- 3rd Army Corps Coat of Arms
- Active: 1 April 1860 – 1 December 2000
- Country: Kingdom of Italy (1860-1946); Italian Republic (1946-2000)
- Branch: Royal Italian Army (1860-1946); Italian Army (1946-2000)
- Role: Corps Command
- Size: Corps
- Garrison/HQ: Milan
- Engagements: Third Italian War of Independence; World War I Second Italo-Ethiopian War; World War II; Multinational Force in Lebanon

The III Army Corps was one of three corps the Italian Army fielded during the Cold War. Based in the regions of Lombardy and Piedmont the corps was the army's operational reserve, while the 4th Alpine Army Corps and the 5th Army Corps, both based in the North East of Italy, were the army's front-line units. After the end of the Cold War the corps was reduced in size and on 1 December 2000 it ceded its last brigades to the 1st Defence Forces Command (COMFOD 1°). The personnel of the 3rd Army Corps was used to raise the NATO Rapid Deployable Italian Corps in January 2001.

== History ==
=== Origins ===
The history of the 3rd Army Corps begins after the second Italian war of independence. Following the Italian-French victory over the Austrian Empire, the Kingdom of Sardinia annexed the Papal Legations in present-day Emilia Romagna. Thus on 1 April 1860 the 3rd Higher Military Command was activated as a territorial command in Parma and tasked to defend the newly acquired territory between the Trebbia and Panaro rivers, an area roughly corresponding with the historic Emilia region. The command consisted of the 5th, 8th and 12th division of the Line.

At the outbreak of the third Italian war of independence the command was renamed as III Army Corps and participated under command of Enrico Morozzo Della Rocca in the Italian Mincio campaign aimed at the Austrian Quadrilatero fortresses with the 7th, 8th, 9th and 16th divisions of the line. On 24 June 1866 the corps was one of two engaged in the Battle of Custoza.

In August 1867 the III Army Corps was disbanded. However, on 14 June 1869 the III Army Corps was raised again in Naples and given territorial duties. Until the outbreak of World War I the corps remained as a territorial command in Italy.

=== World War I ===
After the Italian declaration of war against the Austrian Empire on 23 May 1915 the III Army Corps under Lieutenant General Vittorio Camerana advanced on the extreme left flank of the Italian Army through the Valtellina, Camonica Trompia and Chiese valleys and along the Western shore of Lake Garda into Trentino. Although numerically superior the corps failed to cross the Stelvio and Tonale pass and advanced only until Riva del Garda and Tione, but failed to take either of the two cities. The corps consisted of the 5th and 6th Division of the Line (Infantry), the 35th Territorial Division, the 7th Bersaglieri Regiment and the 5th Alpini Regiment. All soldiers of the 5th Alpini Regiment had been recruited in the aforementioned valleys and thus fought in a territory they knew perfectly well. However the 5th Alpini Regiment was never employed as a whole, but single companies or battalions were given specific mountain summits, ridges or passes to conquer and hold.

- III Army Corps — Lieutenant General Vittorio Camerana
  - 5th Division — Lieutenant General Luigi Druetti
    - Brigade "Cuneo"
      - 7th Infantry Regiment (Battalions I, III, IV — the regiment's II Battalion was deployed overseas and the IV Battalion had been formed as replacement)
      - 8th Infantry Regiment (Battalions I-III)
    - Brigade "Palermo"
      - 67th Infantry Regiment (Battalions I-III)
      - 68th Infantry Regiment (Battalions I, III, IV — the regiment's II Battalion was deployed overseas and the IV Battalion had been formed as replacement)
    - 27th Field Artillery Regiment (5 × batteries with 75/27 mod. 06 field guns — 3 × batteries were assigned to XIV Army Corps) (arrived 7–13 June)
    - 10th Company, 2nd Engineer Regiment (Sappers)
  - 6th Division — Lieutenant General Oscar Roffi
    - Brigade "Sicilia"
      - 61st Infantry Regiment (Battalions I-III)
      - 62nd Infantry Regiment (Battalions I-III)
    - Brigade "Toscana"
      - 77th Infantry Regiment (Battalions I-III)
      - 78th Infantry Regiment (Battalions I-III)
    - 16th Field Artillery Regiment (8 × batteries with 75/27 mod. 06 field guns)
    - 11th Company, 2nd Engineer Regiment (Sappers)
  - 35th Division — Lieutenant General Felice De Chaurand (Reserve division formed shortly before Italy's entry into the war)
    - Brigade "Novara"
      - 153rd Infantry Regiment (Battalions I-III)
      - 154th Infantry Regiment (Battalions I-III)
    - Brigade "Milano"
      - 159th Infantry Regiment (Battalions I-III)
      - 160th Infantry Regiment (Battalions I-III)
    - 42nd Field Artillery Regiment (6 × batteries with 75/27 mod. 06 field guns)
    - V Mobile Militia Cavalry Group (9th and 10th Squadrons)
    - 15th Company, 1st Engineer Regiment (Sappers)
  - Corps Troops
    - 7th Bersaglieri Regiment (Battalions VIII, X, XLIV — the regiment's XI Battalion was stationed in Libya and the regiment formed the XLIV Battalion as replacement)
    - XLV Autonomous Bersaglieri Battalion (Mobile Militia) (formed by the 7th Bersaglieri Regiment)
    - 5th Alpini Regiment (Alpini battalions operated independently of their regiments)
      - Regular Alpini battalions: Alpini Battalion "Morbegno", Alpini Battalion "Tirano", Alpini Battalion "Edolo", Alpini Battalion "Vestone"
      - Territorial Militia Alpini battalions: Alpini Battalion "Val d’Intelvi", Alpini Battalion "Valtellina", Alpini Battalion "Val Camonica", Alpini Battalion "Val Chiese"
    - Reale Guardia di Finanza: III Battalion
    - Regiment "Cavalleggeri di Aquila" (27th) (4 × cavalry squadrons — 1 × squadron was attached to 1st Army) (arrived 20 May)
    - 6th Field Artillery Regiment (8 × batteries with 75/27 mod. 06 field guns)
    - 30th Mountain Artillery Battery, Mountain Artillery Group "Genova", 3rd Mountain Artillery Regiment (with 65/17 mod. 13 mountain guns)
    - II Group, 1st Heavy Field Artillery Regiment (4th and 5th batteries with 149/12 heavy field howitzers)
    - I Miners Battalion (Companies 10, 11, 18), 5th Engineer Regiment (Miners)
    - 4th Telegraphers Company, 3rd Engineer Regiment (Telegraphers)
    - 1/2 18th Company, 2nd Engineer Regiment (Sappers)

After the initial advance had been brought to a halt by the Austro-Hungarian Army the corps dug in and, although fierce fighting continued - especially on the Adamello glaciers - the front in the corps' sector remained almost unchanged until the end of the war. The front became so static that the 35th Territorial Division was sent to participate in the Allied war effort in Macedonia.

After the Italian defeat in the Battle of Caporetto the III Corps was taken out of the front and became the Army's reserve corps, tasked with countering any enemy breakthrough on the Piave front during the winter of 1917/18. In spring of 1918 the corps returned to its original area of deployment. After Austria signed the Armistice of Villa Giusti the III corps finally advanced into Trentino.

=== Interbellum ===
After the war the III Army Corps returned to its garrison in Milan. After the drawdown of forces in the early 1920s the corps consisted of the 6th Infantry Division Legnano in Milan, the 7th Infantry Division Leonessa in Brescia and the 8th Infantry Division Po in Piacenza.

In spring of 1936 the corps was sent to Eritrea to reinforce the Italian troops that faced stiffer than expected resistance during the Italian invasion of Abyssinia. The corps was led by Ettore Bastico and commanded the 27th Infantry Division Sila, 2nd Blackshirt Division 28 Ottobre and a brigade sized formation with light tanks. The corps fought in the First Battle of Tembien, Battle of Amba Aradam and Second Battle of Tembien.

=== World War II ===
After the return to Milan the corps was given the task to defend Italy along the Swiss-Italian border. To aid in its task the corps was given command of the Alpine Wall fortifications in its area of operation. When Italy declared war on France on 10 June 1940 the corps was near the French-Italian border in Limone Piemonte. The Italian Army only performed limited patrols and remained in its positions until after France had asked for an armistice on 20 June 1940. The next day the Italian divisions crossed the border in force, but stiff French resistance stopped them along the entire front after a few kilometres. During the campaign the corps commanded the 3rd Mountain Infantry Division Ravenna, 6th Infantry Division Cuneo and a mixed unit of four Alpini and two Mountain Artillery battalions.

After the Italian invasion of Greece in October 1940 bogged down under stiff Greek resistance the III Army Corps was dispatched to Albania to augment the Italian forces along the Macedonian front. The corps commanded the 19th Infantry Division Venezia, 36th Mountain Infantry Division Forlì, 48th Infantry Division Taro and 53rd Infantry Division Arezzo and the 4th Bersaglieri regiment as Corps reserve. All Italian attacks were repulsed by the Greeks until German forces invaded Greece through Bulgaria and cut the Greek Armies on the Albanian front off. Afterwards the III Army Corps advanced to Thebes where it remained on garrison duty until September 1943 when it surrendered to German forces after the Italian-Allied armistice.

==== World War II commanders ====
- Lieutenant-General Mario Arisio (10 June 1940 - 20 August 1941)
- Lieutenant-General Angelo Rossi (20 August 1941 - 4 April 1943)
- Lieutenant-General Luigi Manzi (4 April - 10 September 1943 : POW)

=== Cold War ===
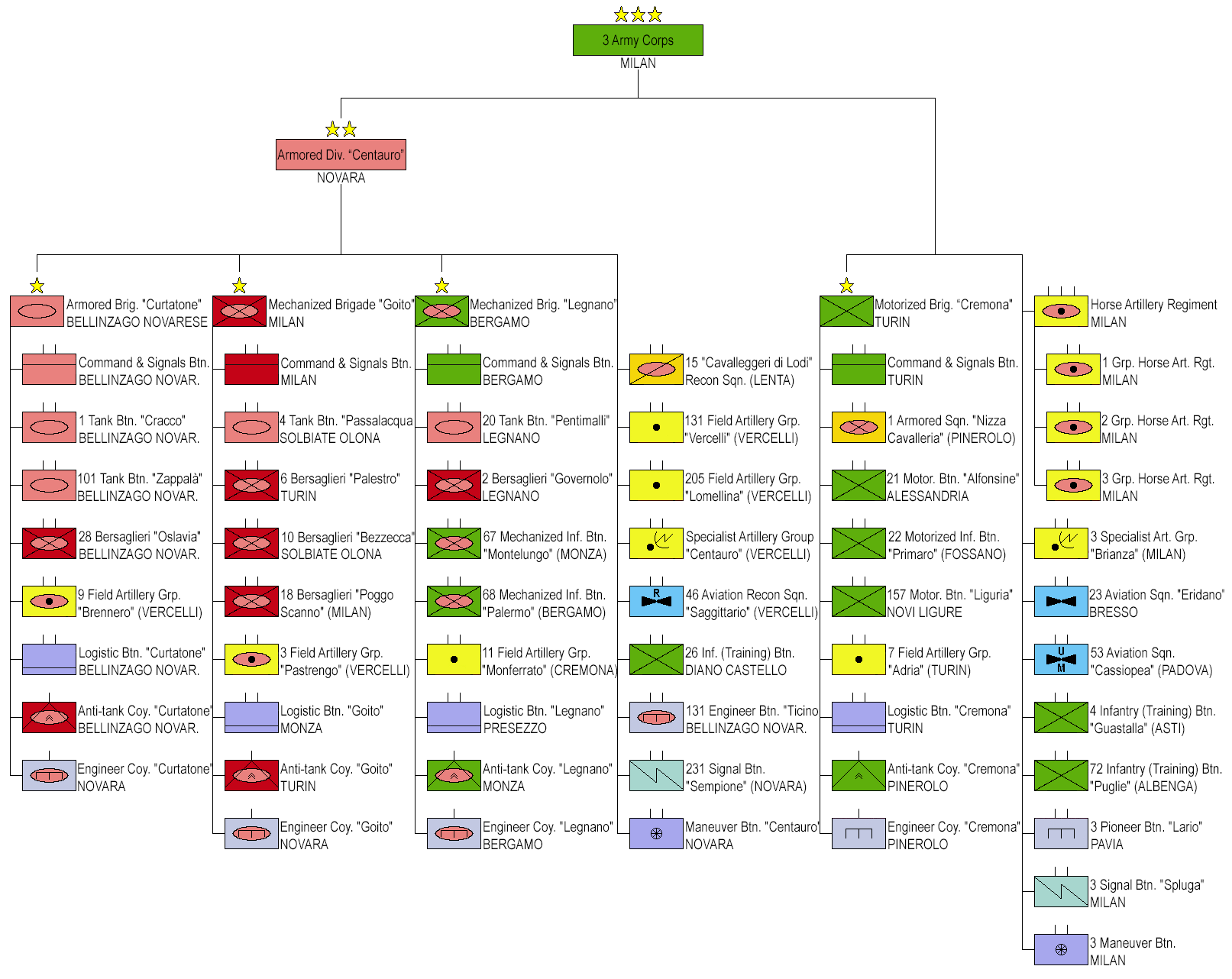
Structure of the 3rd Army Corps in 1986 before the divisional level was abolished (click to enlarge)

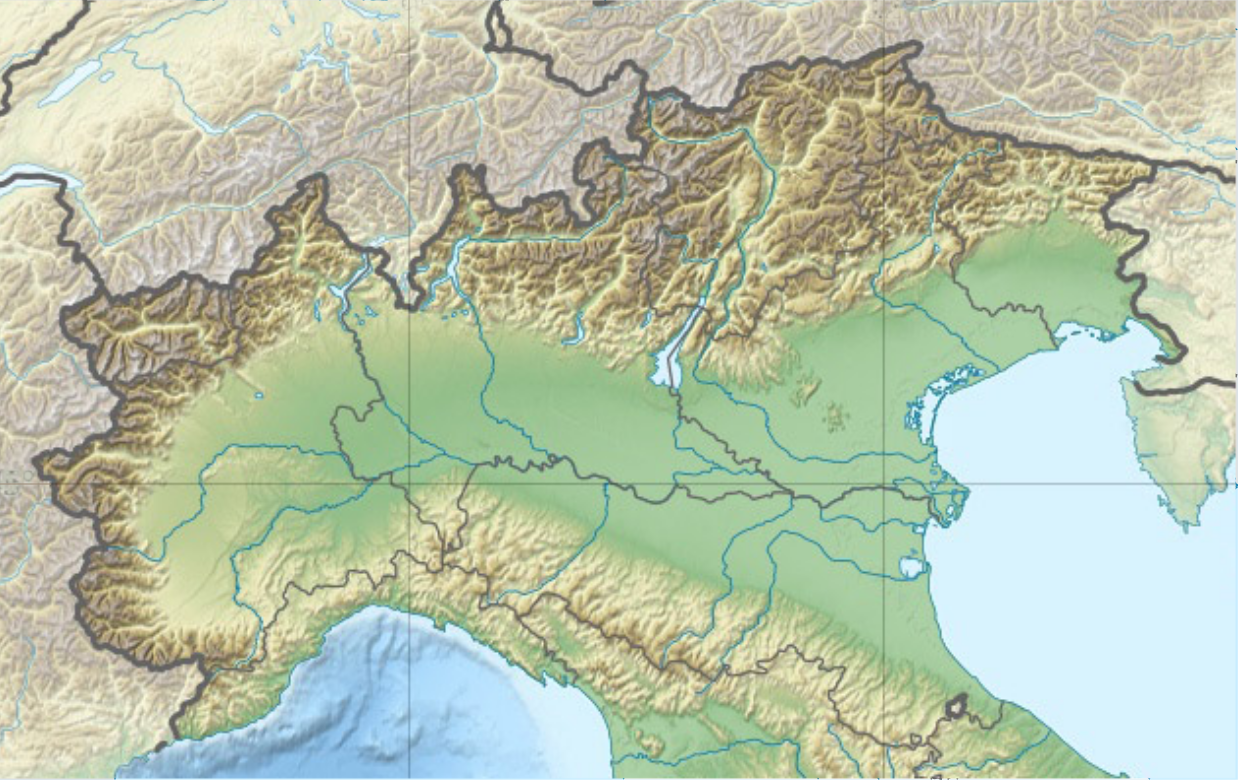
Combat brigades of the 3rd Army Corps in 1986

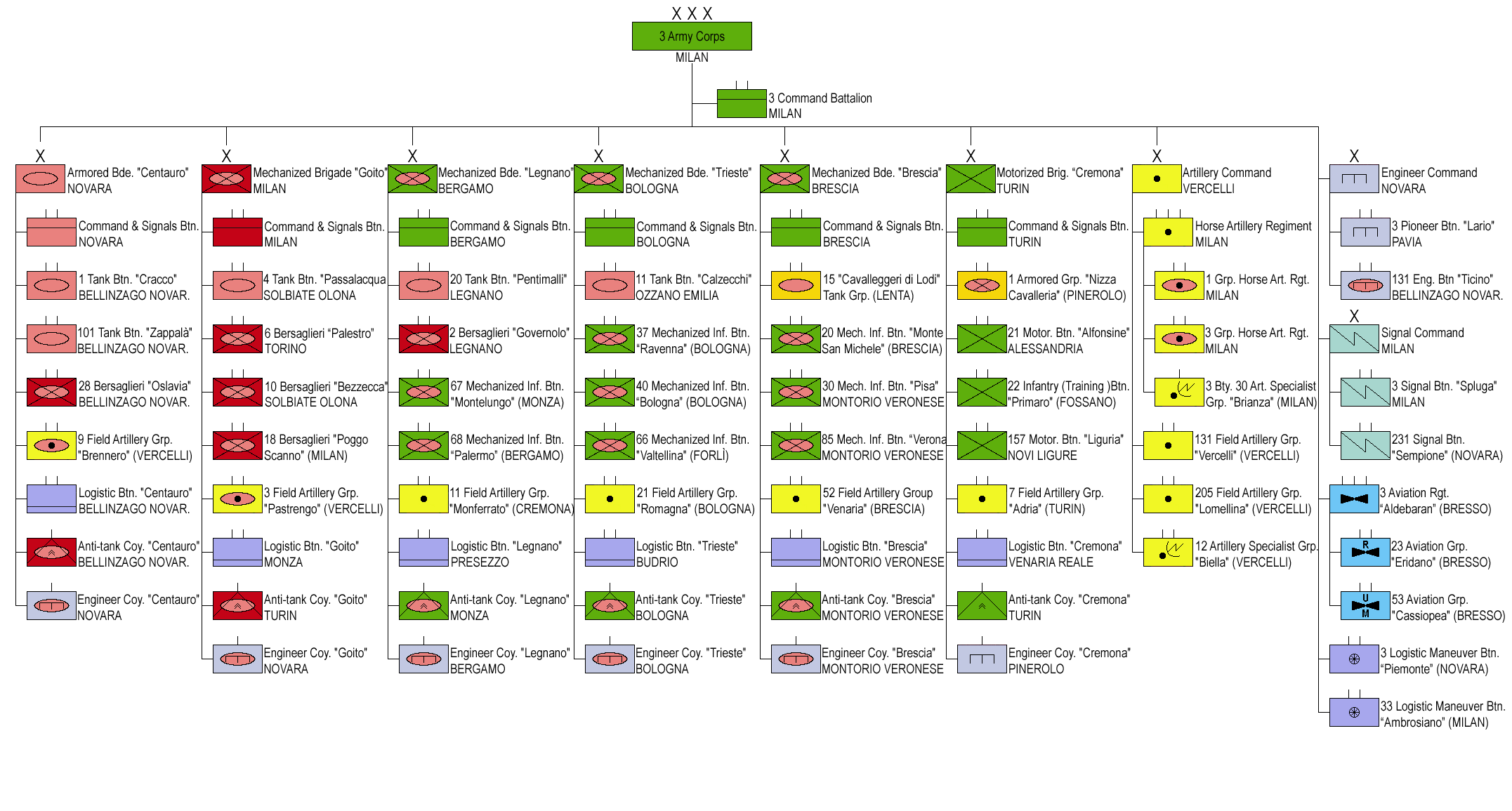
Structure of the 3rd Army Corps in 1989 at the end of the Cold War (click to enlarge)

On 15 June 1945 the III Territorial Military Command was activated in Milan which at the time controlled only the Infantry Division Legnano in Bergamo. The Legnano was a unit of the Italian Co-Belligerent Army and had served on the Allied side during the Italian campaign. Following service with the American 5th Army, the Legnano served with the Polish II Corps on the extreme left of the British 8th Army.

When the corps regained its historic name on 1 July 1957 it included besides the Legnano the Armoured Division Centauro in Novara, the Infantry Division Cremona and Alpine Brigade Taurinense both in Turin. In 1972 the Taurinense was transferred to the IV Alpine Army Corps. The corps - along with the 4th Alpine Army Corps and 5th Army Corps was part of NATOs Allied Land Forces Southern Europe Command (LANDSOUTH) in Verona.

In 1975 the Italian Army undertook a major reorganisation: the regimental level was abolished and battalions came under direct command of brigades, which combined units from different combat arms. In the same year the spelling of the name of the corps was changed from III Army Corps to 3rd Army Corps. Furthermore, the Cremona and Legnano divisions were reduced to brigades and therefore the 3rd Army Corps' new structure on 21 October 1975 was as follows:

- 3rd Army Corps in Milan:
  - Armoured Division Centauro in Novara
    - Armoured Brigade Curtatone in Bellinzago Novarese
    - Mechanized Brigade Goito in Milan
    - Mechanized Brigade Legnano in Bergamo
  - Motorized Brigade Cremona in Turin

In 1986 the Italian Army abolished the divisional level and realigned its forces to counter a possible Warsaw Pact attack better. The 3rd Army Corps was to either act as last line of defence along the Adige and Po rivers or to counter-attack broken through enemy forces in the Venetian plains. The corps was augmented by two mechanized brigades and as the Centauro division carried a historically significant name, the division ceased to exist on 31 October in Novara, but the next day in the same location the Armoured Brigade Centauro was activated and took command of the units of the Curtatone:

- 3rd Army Corps in Milan:
  - Armored Brigade Centauro (Novara)
  - Mechanized Brigade Goito (Milan)
  - Mechanized Brigade Legnano (Bergamo)
  - Mechanized Brigade Brescia (Brescia)
  - Mechanized Brigade Trieste (Bologna)
  - Motorized Brigade Cremona (Turin)

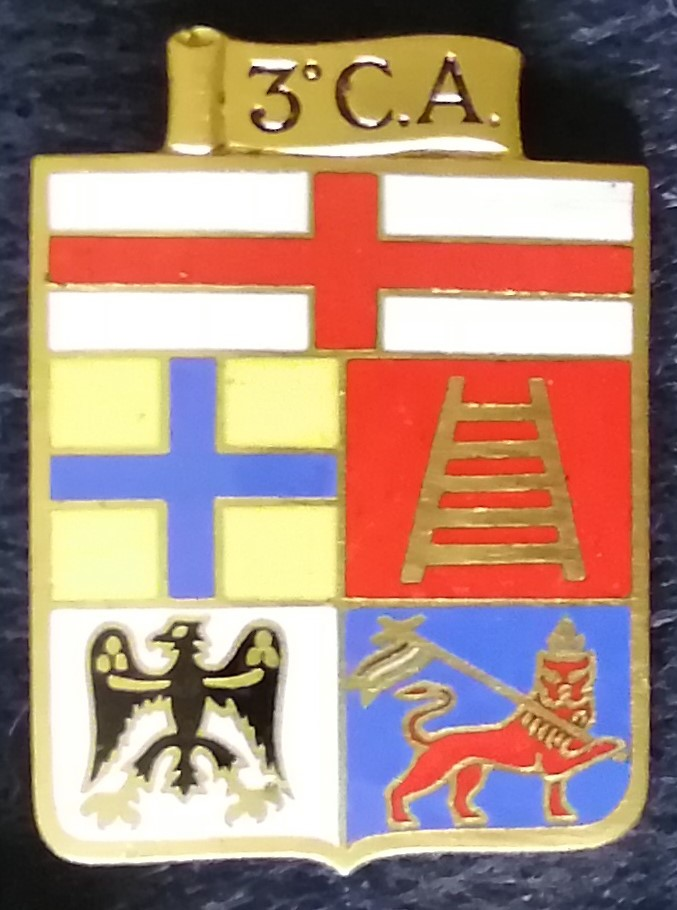
Badge of the 3rd Army Corps (IT)

Each brigade, with the exception of the Centauro, fielded about 4,700 men. The Centauro fielded about 3,400 men and together with the corps' support units the entire corps fielded over 40,000 men. In 1982 Bersaglieri of the Legnano brigade were deployed in Italys first operation outside its soil since World War II as part of the Multinational Force in Lebanon.

=== After the Cold War ===
With the end of the Cold War the Italian Army began a decade long reduction of its forces. The first brigade to disband was the Goito on 1 June 1991, followed by the Brescia on 27 July 1991. Also on 1 June 1991 the Trieste ceased its colours in Bologna and in its stead the Mechanized Brigade Friuli arrived from Florence. The Friuli took command of some units of the disbanded Trieste and entered the ranks of the 3rd Army Corps. In September 1993 the Legnano brigade deployed to Somalia in support of United Nations Unified Task Force mission. In spring 1997 the Corps assumed responsibility for Operation Alba, the first multinational mission led by Italy, in the wake of the Albanian Rebellion of 1997.

In 1997 the army undertook the next big reform process. The 3rd Army Corps saw its Cremona and Legnano brigades disbanded. It also had to cede the Centauro to the 5th Army Corps. On 1 October 1997 the 3rd Army Corps changed its name and became the Projection Forces Command (Comando Forze di Proiezione or COMFOP) and gained the Parachute Brigade Folgore, the Bersaglieri Brigade ''Garibaldi'' and the amphibious Lagunari Regiment Serenissima, thus the corps commanded all rapidly deployable units of the Italian Army. The new structure of the corps was:

- COMFOP in Milan
  - Parachute Brigade Folgore in Livorno
  - Mechanized Brigade Friuli in Bologna
  - Bersaglieri Brigade ''Garibaldi'' in Caserta
  - Lagunari Regiment Serenissima in Venice-Lido
  - 1st Signal Regiment (3rd Signal Battalion Spluga) in Milano
  - 10th Engineer Regiment (3rd Engineer Battalion Lario) in Cremona
  - 26th Infantry Regiment Bergamo (1x training battalion) in Diano Castello
  - 33rd Logistic Regiment Ambrosiano (1x battalion) in Solbiate Olona
  - 121st Infantry Regiment Macerata (1x training battalion) in Fano

However already on 1 December 2000 it ceded its last brigades to the 1st Defence Forces Command (COMFOD 1°). The personnel of the 3rd Army Corps was used to raise the NATO Rapid Deployable Italian Corps in January 2001.
