= 14th Infantry Division "Isonzo" =

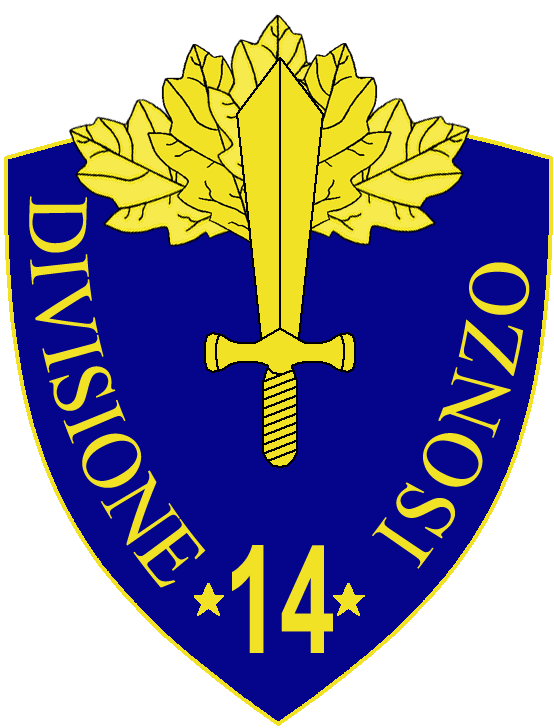
- 14th Infantry Division "Isonzo" insignia
- Active: 1937–1943
- Country: Kingdom of Italy
- Branch: Royal Italian Army
- Type: Infantry
- Size: Division
- Garrison/HQ: Gorizia
- Engagements: World War II

Commanders
- Notable commanders: General Federico Romero

Insignia
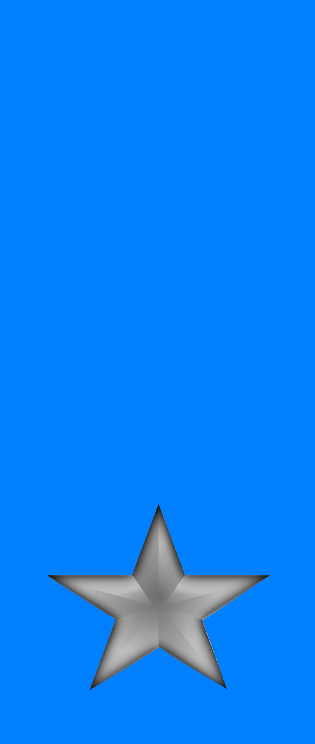
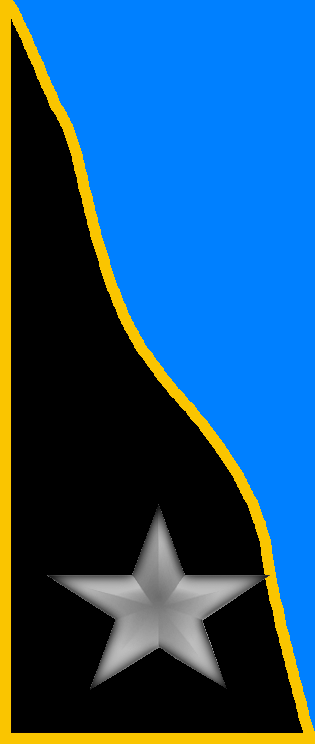
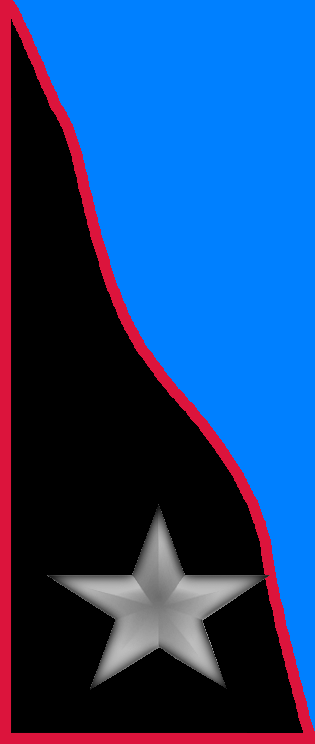
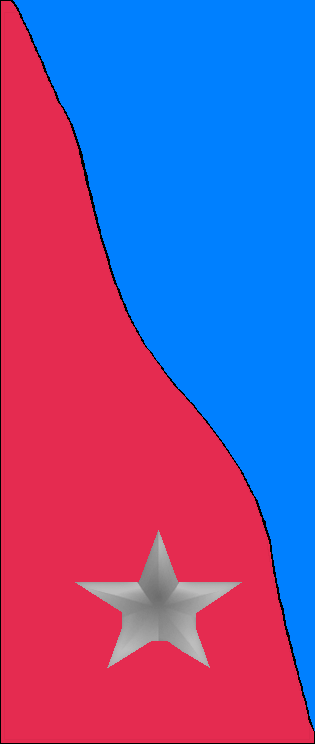
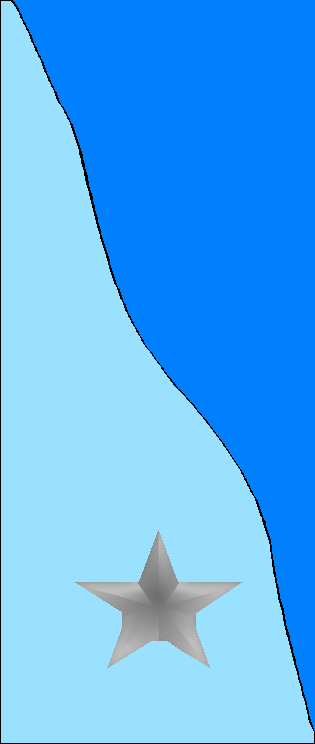
- Identification symbol: Isonzo Division gorget patches

The 14th Infantry Division "Isonzo" (Italian: 14ª Divisione di fanteria "Isonzo") was an infantry division of the Royal Italian Army during World War II. The division was based in Friuli and named for the river Isonzo, along which Italy and Austria-Hungary had fought twelve battles during World War I.

== History ==
After the Second Italian War of Independence the Austrian Empire had to cede the Lombardy region of the Kingdom of Lombardy–Venetia to the Kingdom of Sardinia. After taking control of the region the government of Sardinian ordered the Royal Sardinian Army on 29 August 1859 to raise five infantry brigades and one grenadier brigade in Lombardy. Subsequently on 1 November 1859 the Brigade "Como" was activated with the newly raised 23rd and 24th infantry regiments.

=== World War I ===
The brigade fought on the Italian front in World War I. In autumn 1926 the brigade assumed the name of XIV Infantry Brigade and received the 17th Infantry Regiment "Acqui" from the disbanded Brigade "Acqui". The brigade was the infantry component of the 14th Territorial Division of Gorizia, which also included the 6th Artillery Regiment. In 1934 the division changed its name to 14th Infantry Division "Isonzo". In late 1938 the division's 17th Infantry Regiment "Acqui" was transferred from Cormons to Schlanders in preparation for the activation of the 33rd Infantry Division "Acqui". On 24 May 1939 the division dissolved the XIV Infantry Brigade, with the two remaining infantry regiments coming under direct command of the division. On the same date both infantry regiments and the 6th Artillery Regiment were given the name "Isonzo".

=== World War II ===
On 10 June 1940, the day Italy entered World War II, the Isonzo was deployed along the border with Yugoslavia near Postojna and performed security duties from Kalce, Logatec to Javornik Hills. The division remained in the area on border patrol duty until the invasion of Yugoslavia on 6 April 1941. The Isonzo crossed the border on 6 April in Gorizia and advanced toward Brezovica. On 11 April 1940 the division reached the Golovec District. After Yugoslavia's surrender the division was tasked with mopping-up operations and road patrols in the area. In January 1942 the division participated in large battles against Yugoslav partisans in Bosnia. On 22 September 1942 partisans ambushed one of the division's companies, resulting in 60 killed and 24 missing. In 1943 the Isonzo fought a series of battles against the increasing number of partisans in Slovenia, abandoning gradually much of the countryside and concentrating on the defence of the main roads.

After the Armistice of Cassibile was announced on 8 September 1943 the division was ordered to move from Novo Mesto to Rijeka in Italy, but en route the division was dissolved near Kočevje on 11 September 1943 by the invading German forces.

== Organization ==
14th Infantry Division "Isonzo" organization in 1940

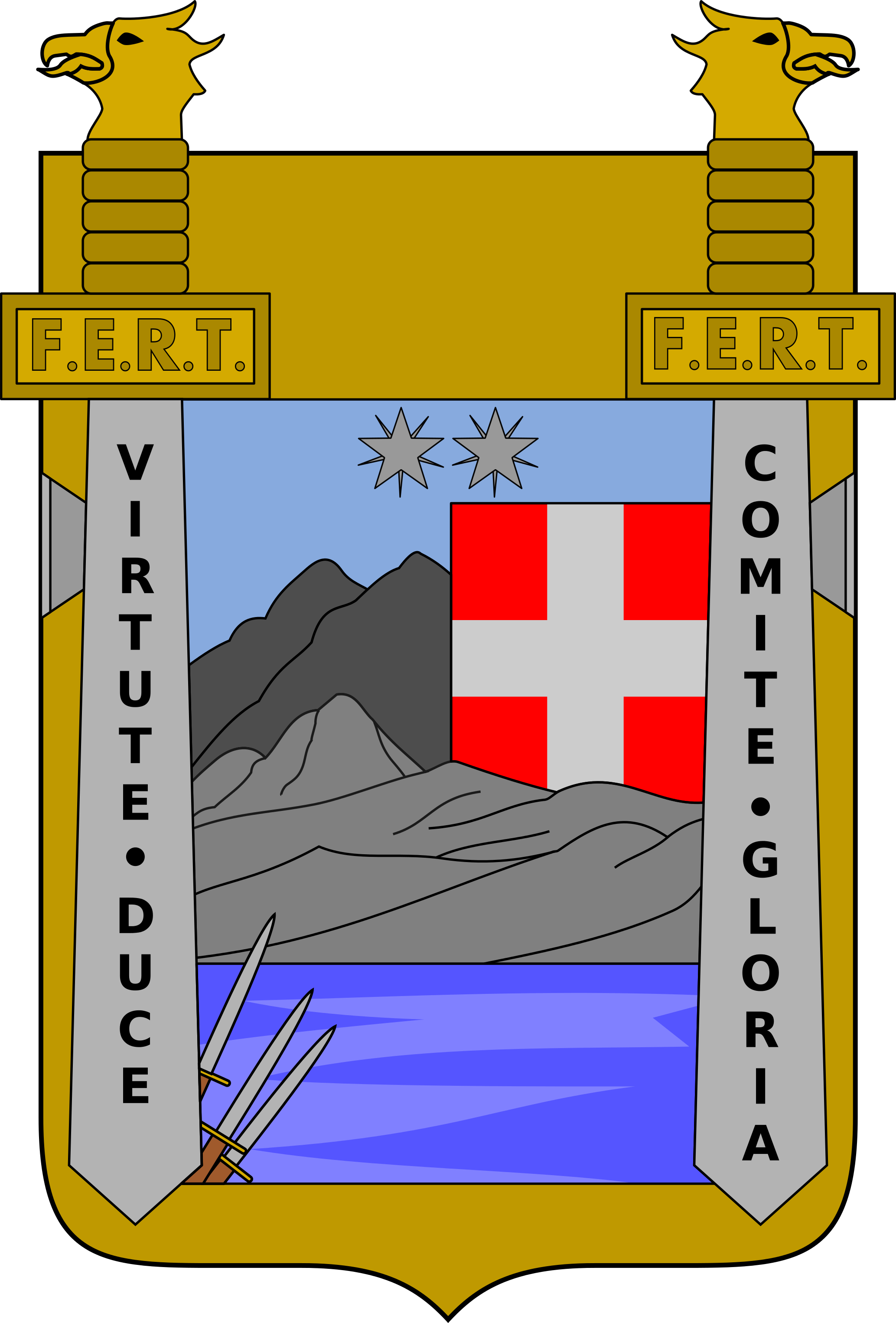
Coat of Arms of the 24th Infantry Regiment "Isonzo", 1939

- 14th Infantry Division "Isonzo", in Gorizia
  - Headquarters
    - Command Company
    - 38th Carabinieri Section
    - 1 × Carabinieri Section
    - 59th Field Post Office
    - 14th Infantry Division Command Transport Squad
  - 23rd Infantry Regiment "Isonzo", (Note: Named 23rd Infantry Regiment "Como" until 1939 when the army reorganized its divisions as binary divisions and divisional infantry regiments took the name of the division.) in Gorizia
    - Command Company
    - 3 × Fusilier battalions
    - Support Weapons Battery (65/17 mod. 13 infantry support guns)
    - Mortar Company (81mm mod. 35 mortars)
  - 24th Infantry Regiment "Isonzo", (Note: Named 24th Infantry Regiment "Como" until 1939 when the army reorganized its divisions as binary divisions and divisional infantry regiments took the name of the division.) in Postojna
    - Command Company
    - 3 × Fusilier battalions
    - Support Weapons Battery (65/17 mod. 13 infantry support guns)
    - Mortar Company (81mm mod. 35 mortars)
  - 6th Artillery Regiment "Isonzo", in Gorizia
    - Command Unit
    - I Group (100/17 mod. 14 howitzers)
    - II Group (75/27 mod. 11 field guns; transferred in June 1940 from the 14th Artillery Regiment "Ferrara")
    - III Group (75/13 mod. 15 mountain guns)
    - 1 × Anti-aircraft battery (20/65 mod. 35 anti-aircraft guns)
    - Ammunition and Supply Unit
  - XIV Mortar Battalion (81mm mod. 35 mortars)
  - 14th Anti-tank Company (47/32 mod. 35 anti-tank guns)
  - 14th Telegraph and Radio Operators Company
  - 40th Engineer Company
  - 115th Medical Section
    - 53rd Field Hospital
    - 54th Field Hospital
    - 1 × Surgical Unit
  - 14th Autocarrette Section
  - 29th Supply Section
  - 1 × Transport Section

Attached to the division from 1941:

- 98th CC.NN. Legion "Maremmana"
  - Command Company
  - XCVIII CC.NN. Battalion
  - CXVII CC.NN. Battalion
  - 98th CC.NN. Machine Gun Company

== Commanding officers ==
The division's commanding officers were:

- Generale di Divisione Federico Romero (15 April 1938 - 1 March 1942)
- Generale di Brigata Emilio Coronati (5 March 1942 - 20 July 1942)
- Generale di Brigata Alessandro Maccario (21 July 1942 - 1943)
- Generale di Brigata Guido Cerruti (acting, 1943 - 12 September 1943)

== CROWCASS ==
The names of 51 men attached to the division can be found in the Central Registry of War Criminals and Security Suspects (CROWCASS) set up by the Anglo-American Supreme Headquarters Allied Expeditionary Force in 1945. The names can be found at: Central Registry of War Criminals and Security Suspects from the Kingdom of Italy.
