= Battle of Misrata (1912) =

Battle during the Italo-Turkish War

- Part of the Italo-Turkish War
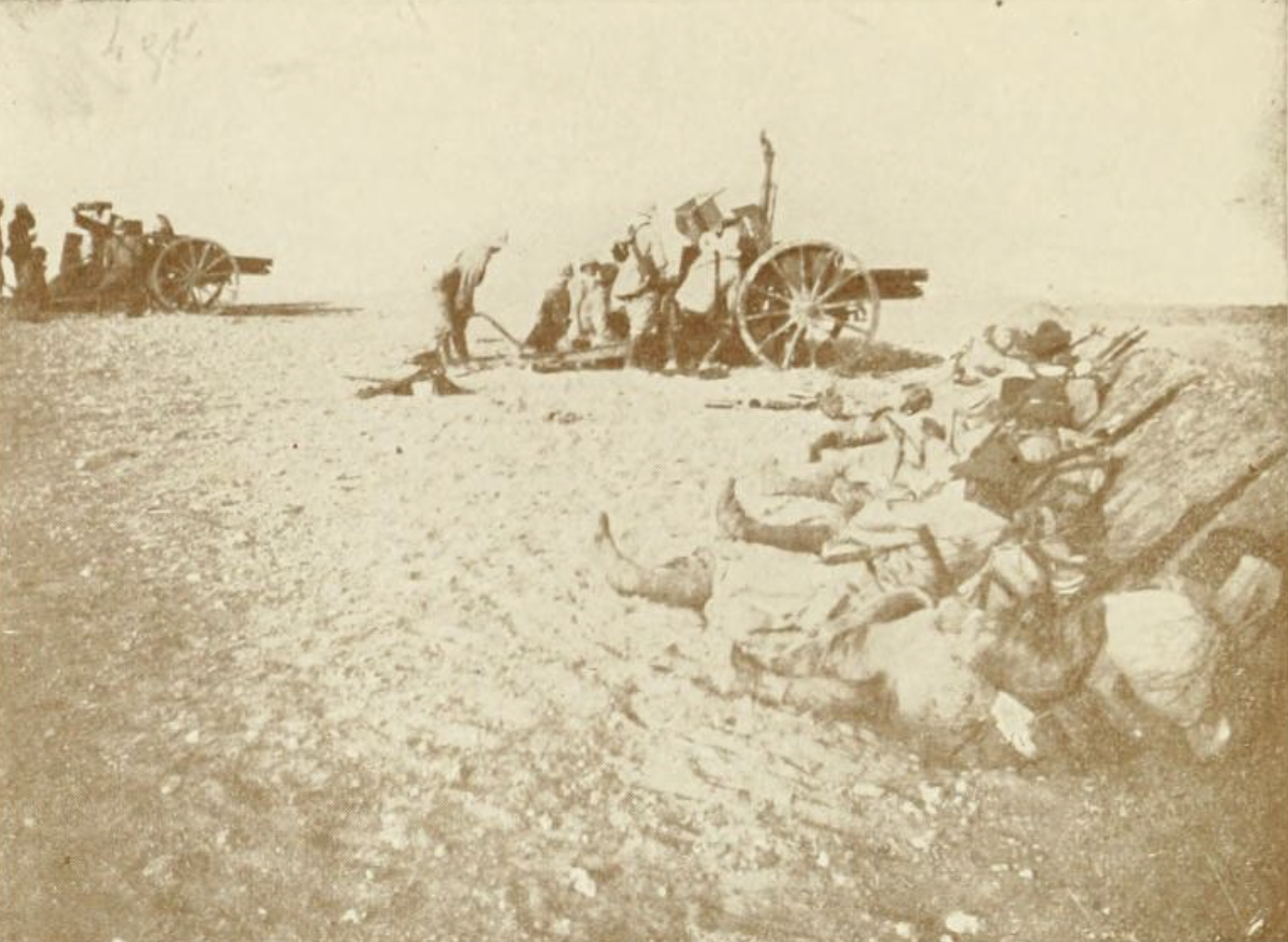
- Italian artillery advance at Misrata
Date	9 July 1912
Location	Misrata, Tripolitania, Ottoman Empire (now Libya) 32°22′39.12″N 15°05′31.26″E
Result	Italian victory

Belligerents
Italy	Ottoman Empire

Commanders and leaders
Vittorio Camerana; Gustavo Fara	Unknown

Strength
10,000	Unknown

Casualties and losses
142 dead and wounded	Unknown

The Battle of Misrata was fought between Italian and Turkish forces on 9 July 1912 during the Italo-Turkish War. The battle was fought for control of the Tripolitanian town of Misrata, a major supply base for Ottoman forces.

== Background ==
During the Italo-Turkish War, the town of Misrata (known to the Italians as Misurata), located on the Tripolitanian coast halfway between Tripoli and Sirte, became an important base for the smuggling of war materials used to bolster Turkish-Arab resistance. The Italian command had planned the attack of the town as early as December 1911, but the execution of the plan was delayed.

In June 1912, the Italian command finally moved to carry out the operation. For the amphibious landing and attack the 1st Special Division was formed consisting of seven infantry battalions from the 40th, 50th, and 63rd Infantry Regiments; the Alpini Battalions "Verona" and "Mondovì"; an Askari company from the 5th Eritrean Battalion; a Squadron of the 16th Light Cavalry Regiment "Lucca"; four artillery batteries (one of field artillery and three of mountain artillery); and other units.

== Battle ==
On 16 June 1912 the troopships carrying the Special Division, escorted by the battleships Re Umberto, Sicilia and Sardegna and by the torpedo boats Airone and Clio, arrived near the coast of Misrata and landed a battalion of seamen, as well as other units, near the village of Bu Sceifa. The landing troops, supported by gunfire from Re Umberto, overcame the resistance of the Turkish-Arab troops entrenched behind the dunes on the beach, captured Bu Sceifa and advanced inland until they reached the edge of the Misrata oasis.

No attempt was made to immediately advance into Misrata and attack the Turkish-Arab garrison. Italian General Camerana chose instead to remain on the defensive and consolidate his position. As such, the Italians spent the next week creating a base of operations by bringing supplies on-shore and fortifying their position. Reconnaissance of the general vicinity was conducted and it was reported that there were no signs of large Turkish-Arabs forces in the area. On 23 June, however, Turkish-Arab activities were observed at the Misrata oasis. On 5 July, a Turkish-Arab force estimated to be as large as 5,000 men attacked the Italian encampment and was repulsed.

Four days later on 9 July at 4:00 am, General Camerana formed his force into three columns and advanced upon Misrata. Two columns advanced directly on the oasis while the third column attempted to sweep around and attack Misrata from the south. The Italian column on the right met resistance from Turkish-Arab forces entrenched on the eastern edge of the oasis but continued to advance. The Italian column in the center also came upon Turkish-Arab resistance as they entered the oasis and village of Az Zarrug. In succession, however, the Italians captured the oasis at Misrata; the oasis and village of Az Zarrug; and the city of Misrata. By 6:00 pm, the Turkish-Arab forces were withdrawing and the fighting was over.

== Aftermath ==
After capturing Misrata, the Italian forces fortified the area with units from the 50th and 63rd Infantry Regiment; the Alpini Battalions "Verona" and "Mondovì"; a company of Eritrean Askari; some artillery batteries as well as engineers and service personnel. Az Zarrug was garrisoned by troops from the 35th Infantry Regiment.

Misrata remained in Italian hands until August 1915, when all Italian troops were withdrawn from the town due to Italy's participation in World War I and widespread rebellion in Libya. Misrata would be eventually recaptured by Italian forces in 1922, during the Pacification of Libya.

== See also ==
- Italo-Turkish War
