= Felice De Chaurand =

Italian general

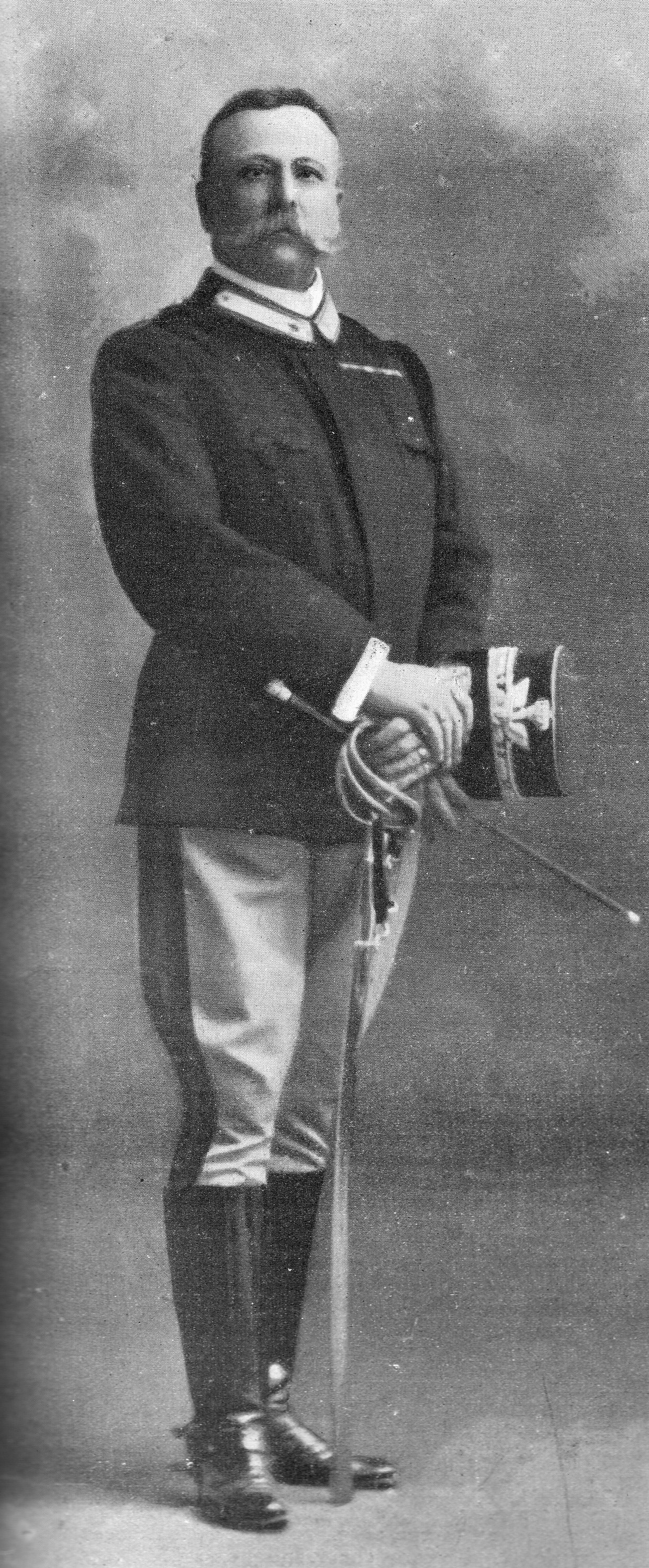
- Born: April 1, 1857; Chiavari, Liguria, Sardinia-Piedmont
- Died: 1944 (aged 87); Dalmine, Lombardy, Italy
- Military career
- Allegiance: Italy
- Branch: Royal Italian Army
- Service years: 1884 – 1916
- Rank: Lieutenant general
- Commands: 35th Infantry Division
- Conflicts: Italo-Turkish War: Battles of Zanzur; World War I: Italian front
- Other work: Spy

Felice De Chaurand de Saint Eustache (1857-1944) was an Italian general and spy who was a major contributor of the early Servizio Informazioni Militare as well as the commander of the Italian 35th Infantry Division during World War I.

== Biography ==
Count Felice De Chaurand de Saint Eustache was appointed second lieutenant of artillery in 1875. He attended the Scuola di guerra dell'esercito and entered the General Staff Corps in 1884. In 1898 he was promoted to colonel, the rank with which he commanded the 39th Infantry Regiment.

In September 1900 he was appointed head of the Italian I Office of the Army Staff. With this assessment, this would be his first approach to the Servizio Informazioni Militare. His major contributions there was the solving of a correspondence that used the Sittler and Mengarini codes but left the organization in June 1902.

In 1905, he was promoted to major general and commander of the Reggio brigade. In 1910 he was promoted to lieutenant general and participated in the Italo-Turkish War of November 1911 at the helm of the 3rd special division, made up of seven infantry battalions, one of Alpine troops, one of grenadiers and a 75 mm batter. De Chaurand was honored in the fighting and for his contributions, he was awarded the commander's cross of the Military Order of Savoy.

During World War I, he was in command of the 35th division on the Tridentine front in the area of the Tonezza del Cimone plateau. He was dismissed by the command and sent home on May 16, 1916, at the start of the Battle of Asiago. He was a prolific author of military history and analysis texts, as well as being a precursor to the use of cryptography and ciphers in Italy. He married Matilde Dall'Ovo who was from Bergamo.

When he reflected upon the events on the Italo-Turkish War, Chaurand said:

The events of that campaign... had not enough impact on the country to produce a profound re-awakening of its populations, unnerved by a long peace, and made inert by humanitarian and pacifist doctrines.

== Awards ==
- Military Order of Savoy, Officer (March 16, 1913)
- Military Order of Savoy, Commander (April 5, 1914)
