= Battles of Zanzur (1912) =

Battles that occurred during the Italo-Turkish War

Battles of Sidi Bilal
- Part of the Italo-Turkish War
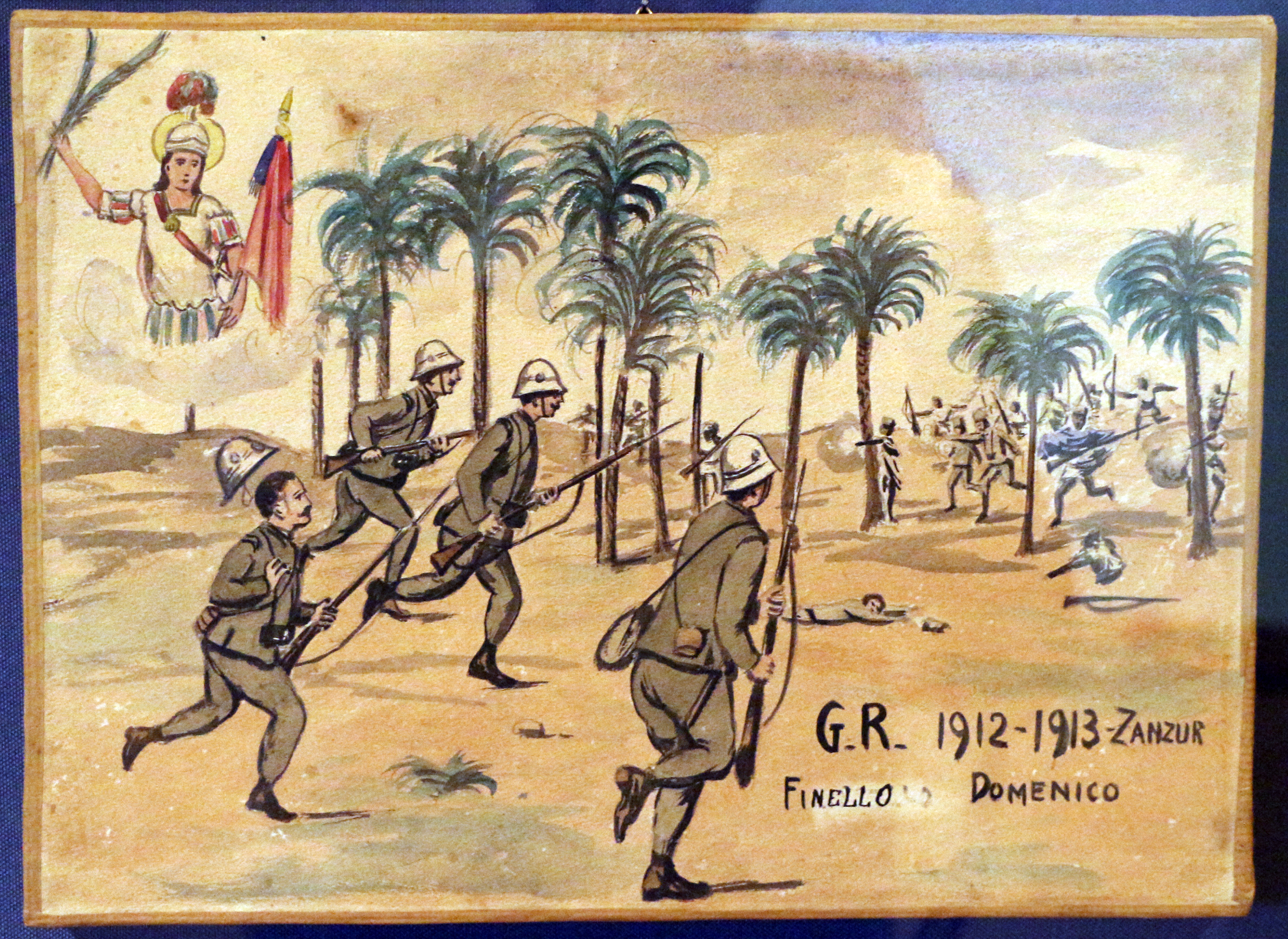
Date	1. 8 June 1912 at Sidi Abd al-Jalil; 2. 20 September 1912 at Sidi Bilal
Location	Janzour, Ottoman Tripolitania (now Libya)
Result	Italian victories: Italians take Janzour

Belligerents
Kingdom of Italy	Ottoman Empire

Commanders and leaders
8 June; Vittorio Camerana; Pietro Frugoni; 20 September; Felice De Chaurand; Ottavio Ragni	Unknown

Strength
8 June; 13,494 Infantry of four regiments (6th, 40th, 84th, and 82nd regiments) and one askari battalion (5th); 1,136 Cavalry of eight squadrons	8 June; 14,000 (entrenched)

Casualties and losses
8 June; 43 killed and 279 wounded	8 June; 1,000–2,000 killed Thousands wounded

The Battles of Zanzur or Battles of Janzur, were a series of battles that took place in 1911–1912 at Zanzur oasis, near Tripoli during the Italo-Turkish War. During the battles, the Italians unsuccessfully attacked the Turkish-Arab stronghold located approximately twelve miles from the Italian lines at Tripoli until finally achieving a victory on 20 September 1912.

== Background ==
In 1911 as a part of its colonial plans for Africa, Italy lusted after the Ottoman Empire's Tripolitania province. On 28 September 1911, the Italian Chargé d'Affaires presented the Turkish government in Constantinople with an ultimatum demanding that the Ottoman Empire consent to the military occupation of its North African province of Tripolitania by Italy within 24 hours. As its justification, Italy used the unfounded claim that the action was necessary to end the disorder and neglect of the territory. The Ottoman Empire refused and on 29 September 1911, the Italian government declared war on Turkey.

At that time, Tripolitania was largely a barren land with a total population of approximately 1.5 million inhabitants composed largely of nomadic Arab Bedouin tribes. The Ottoman Empire had ruled the territory with a light hand as an autonomous province since 1835. When Italy declared war on the Ottoman Empire, Tripolitania was defended by Turkish forces totaling only 7,000 men in antiquated, second-rate forts in the cities along the coast of the Mediterranean Sea. As such, the Italians expected that a show of force might be enough to cause the Turks to seek to avoid war by means of a diplomatic solution. To that end, the Italian plan was to capture and occupy the major cities along the Mediterranean, namely Tripoli, Tobruk, Derna, Benghazi, and Homs.

Immediately following the declaration of war, the Italian Navy established a blockade of 700 nautical miles along the shores of Tripolitania and took command of the eastern Mediterranean in order to transport an expeditionary force to the African coast. The first city targeted for invasion was Tripoli, where the Turkish garrison quickly evacuated the city with the exception of 150 men manning the artillery of the five coastal forts. The remainder of the Turkish forces withdrew to the safety of the village of Gharian in the hills, a two-day march south. On 30 September, the Italians demanded that the Turks surrender the city by the 2nd of October. Three days later when no response was received from the Turks, the Italians began a bombardment of the Turkish forts. After eight hours of bombardment spanning two days, the Turks evacuated the forts and withdrew south of the city. On 5 October, the Italians landed a force of 1,200 men and claimed the city.

The Turks did not counter-attack until the night of 9 October when they attacked the Italian positions in the area of the Bu Meliana wells, south of Tripoli with the help of their Tripolitania irregular forces. The attack was repelled and a day later the Italian cruiser Varese arrived in Tripoli escorting two troopships. This brought the Italians needed reinforcements to Tripoli to supplement the naval landing force of 1,200 temporarily holding the city. The following day, the remainder of the Italian invasion force arrived increasing the complement of Italian soldiers in the city to 35,000. At that point, the outnumbered Turks were content to flee the city and take refuge at a number of points surrounding the city including Gharian to the south; Ain Zara, about five miles to the southeast; and at the Zanzur oasis twelve miles to the southwest. The Turkish commander, Colonel Neschat Bey, began immediately to call upon his Bedouin allies and assemble a larger force. During the month of October by recruiting native volunteers, Colonel Neschat Bey grew his force to an army of 20,000 men.

The battle for Tripoli, however, continued till nearly the end of October and included the massacre and slaughter of Italian soldiers by Turkish-Arab forces on 23 October at Shar al-Shatt and the reciprocal massacre and slaughter of Tripolitania civilians by the Italians on 24–26 October at the Mechiya Oasis

It was mid-December before the Italians felt secure enough in Tripoli to attempt invasions into the interior of Tripolitania to attack the strongholds of the Turkish-Arab forces. The first of those attacks occurred on 4 December when the Italians successfully attacked and captured Ain Zara. After that strike, the Italians turned their attention to Zanzur.

== Battles ==
Throughout the winter and spring of 1911–1912, the Italians attempted numerous times to attack and capture the Turkish-Arab stronghold of Zanzur. On 17 December 1911, Italian General Pecori-Giraldi led four battalions of infantry on an attack. The attack was unsuccessful and the Italians suffered casualties of 50 men killed and 100 wounded. It was seen as such a failure in the eyes of the Italian Army that General Pecori-Giraldi was relieved of his command. The Italians tried again, once in January and twice in February, but in each case the Italian infantry was repelled by the Turkish-Arab defenders.

Meanwhile, the Turkish-Arab forces surrounding Tripoli continued to prosecute the war by means of incessantly attacking the perimeter defences that the Italians had established to protect the city. In March, the Italians again made multiple attempts to capture Zanzur, even utilizing dirigible airships to drop hand grenades and bombs upon the defenders. In each case, the Turkish-Arab defenders continued to fight off and defeat the Italians.

Finally in June, the Italians assembled an attack force three times larger than previously engaged and set out once again to capture Zanzur. On the morning of 8 June, the Italian army commanded by Vittorio Camerana attacked the Turkish-Arab defenders of Zanzur at their position on the heights of Abd-el-Gilil on the east side of the oasis. The Italian attack force included 14 battalions of infantry, one brigade of cavalry, and a mountain battery. After a hard-fought engagement, the Italians secured a position on the heights, entrenched a perimeter, and fought off a flank attack by Turkish-Arabs reinforcements from Bu Meliana. Here the battle ended. The Turkish-Arab defenders had given up the heights of Abd-el-Gilil, but remained in possession of the Zanzur oasis. The Italians suffered casualties of 43 killed and 279 wounded while Turkish-Arab casualties were estimated to range from 1,000 to 1,400 killed.

The occupation of the heights of Abd-el-Gilil gave the Italians a measure of control over the Zanzur oasis, however, to further their objectives at Tripoli it was necessary that they take possession of the oasis along with the hills to the south, the valley of Hira, and the height of Sidi-Bilal. On 17 September, the Turkish-Arab forces suffered a major defeat at Derna incurring casualties of 2,000 men killed. Although Derna is more than 700 miles east, the loss of men affected the ability of the Turkish-Arab forces to continue the resistance in the vicinity of Tripoli. Taking advantage of the situation, the Italians commanded by Lieutenant General Ragni attacked Zanzur including the height of Sidi-Bilal on 20 September and finally defeated the Turkish-Arab force after 12 hours of fighting.

== Aftermath ==
After the occupation of Zanzur, Tripoli was quiet. By 8 October, the Italians had extended their field railroad from the western perimeter of Tripoli at Gagaresh to Zanzur and opened it for traffic. The Italians then set their sights on additional incursions into the interior.

Meanwhile, the Balkan states of Montenegro, Bulgaria, Serbia, and Greece formed the Balkan League after observing the struggles of the Ottoman Empire in the Italo-Turkish War. In an attempt to reclaim territory in Eastern Europe, Montenegro declared war on the Ottoman Empire on 8 October. Bulgaria, Serbia and Greece followed Montenegro's lead and declared war on the Ottoman Empire on 18 October

Given the burden of a pending war in the Balkans, the plenipotentiaries from Italy and Turkey quickly wrapped up the negotiations that had been underway since August and signed a preliminary Treaty of Peace in Lausanne, Switzerland on 15 October. The final draft of the treaty which has come to be known as the Treaty of Ouchy was signed on 18 October 1912.

== See also ==
- Italo-Turkish War
- Battle of Tripoli (1911)
- Battle of Ain Zara
