= Monte Novegno =

Mountain in Italy

Coordinates: 45°46′N 11°19′E

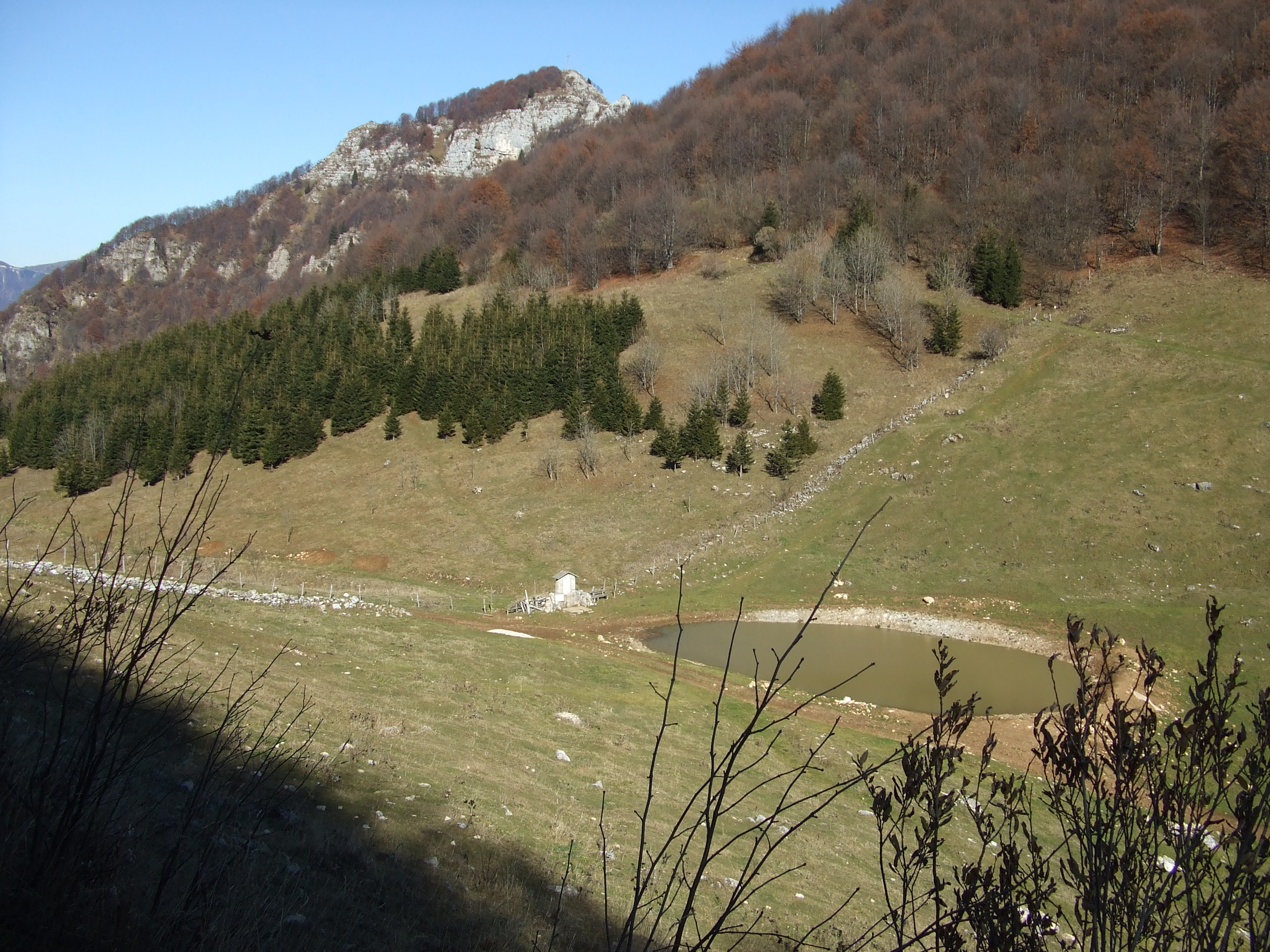

Geography
- Location: Veneto, Italy

Monte Novegno is a mountain of the Veneto, Italy. It has an elevation of 1,552 metres.
