= Vittorio Camerana =

Italian general

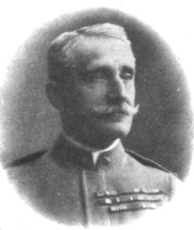
- Born: 22 July 1855; Turin, Piedmont, Sardinia–Piedmont
- Died: 22 August 1923 (aged 68); Turin, Piedmont, Italy
- Military career
- Allegiance: Kingdom of Italy
- Branch: Royal Italian Army
- Service years: 1889 – 1923
- Rank: Lieutenant General
- Commands: III Army Corps
- Conflicts: Italo-Turkish War: Battle of Misrata; Battles of Zanzur; World War I: Italian front; Battle of Asiago; Battle of Vittorio Veneto

Vittorio Camerana was an Italian general who commanded the III Army Corps of World War I. At the end of the war, he was promoted to General of the Army Corps and decorated with the Grand Officer Cross of the Military Order of Savoy.

== Biography ==
He was born in Turin on 22 July 1855 into a noble family. Camerana enlisted in the Royal Army he embarked on a military career, and in 1889 he was promoted to major in force at the 62nd Infantry Regiment.

He took part in the Italo-Turkish War, and on 16 June 1912, under the command of a division of 9,000 men, making the surprise landing between Ras Zarrùgh and the tip of Sidi bu Sceifa, encountering weak resistance. On the next day, the town of Gasr Ahmèd was occupied and on 8 July, Misrata fell to the Italians. During the same year he was appointed head of the occupation of Misrata. Returning to his homeland decorated with the Commander's Cross of the Military Order of Savoy, he assumed the post of Deputy Commander of the Corps of Staff, and after the death of the Chief of Staff of the Royal Army, General Alberto Pollio, he assumed his office ad "interim" until the definitive appointment of general Luigi Cadorna.

When Italy entered the war on 24 May 1915, he assumed command of the III Corps which made up of the 5th and 6th Line Infantry Divisions, the 35th Territorial Division, the 7th Bersaglieri Regiment, the 5th Alpini Regiment and a battalion of the Guardia di Finanza. It was part of the 1st Army of General Roberto Brusati.

In the initial stages of the conflict, the III Corps went through Valtellina, Val Camonica, Val Trompia, Valle del Chiese and advanced along the western shore of Lake Garda in Trentino, but were unable to pass the Stelvio Pass and the Passo del Tonale, stopping in front of Riva del Garda and Tione but couldn't capture either of the two cities. He maintained command of this army corps for the duration of the conflict, and took part in the Battle of Asiago and then at the Battle of Vittorio Veneto.

After the end of the war he was promoted to general of the army corps and awarded the Cross of Grand Officer of the Military Order of Savoy but he died in Turin on 22 August 1923.

He was married to Giuseppina Winspeare Guicciardi (19 August 1873 – 22 July 1934) and the couple had two children: Giancarlo and Adele.

== Awards ==
- Military Order of Savoy, commander (March 16, 1913)
- Military Order of Savoy, grand officer (November 4, 1922)
- Order of the Crown of Italy, Knight of the Grand Cross
