= Monte Priaforà =

Mountain in Italy

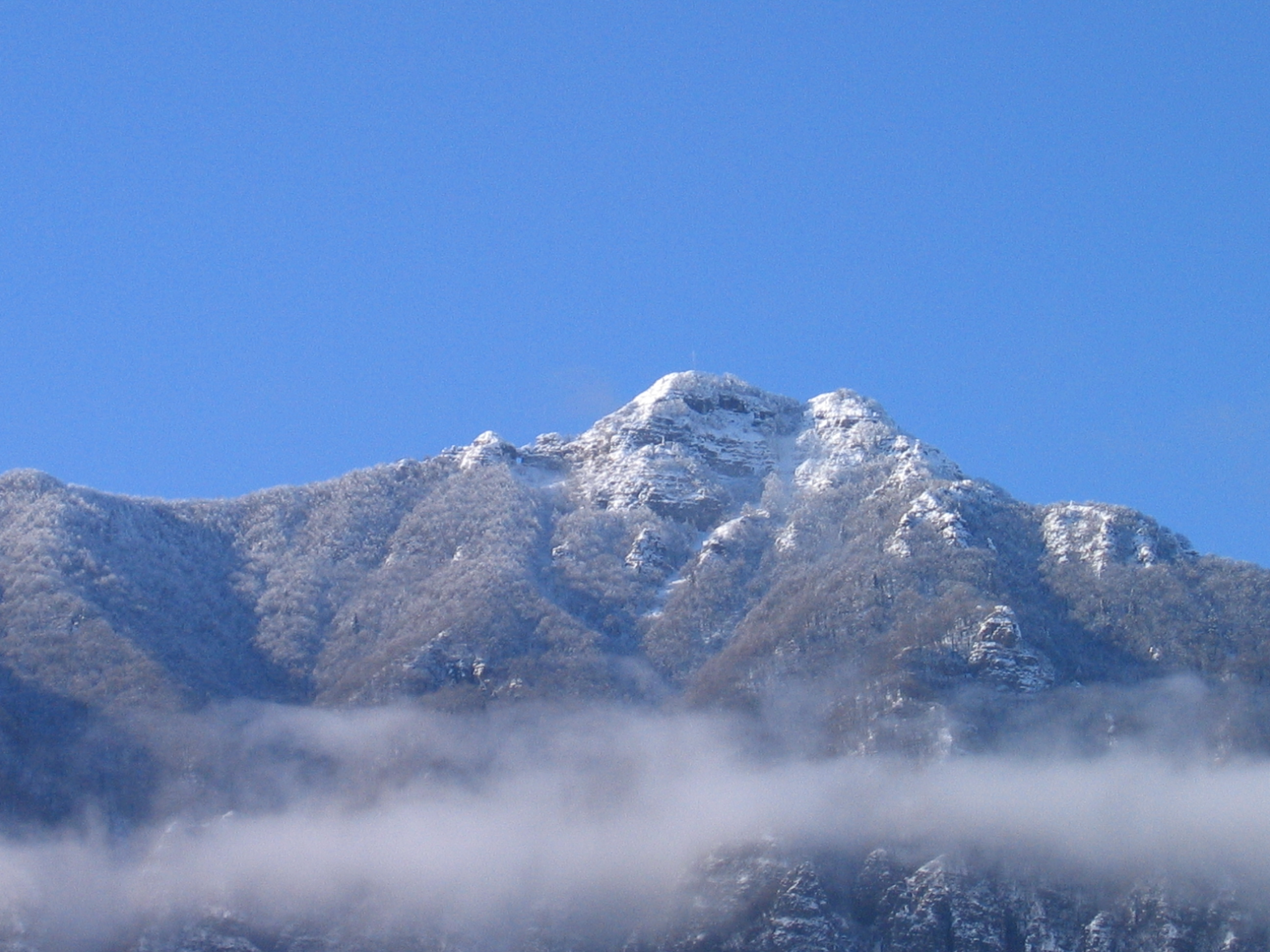

Highest point
- Elevation: 1,659 m (5,443 ft)
- Coordinates: 45°47′13″N 11°19′08″E

Geography
- Location within Italy
- Location: Veneto, Italy

Monte Priaforà is a mountain of the Veneto, Italy. It has an elevation of 1,659 metres. It is part of the Little Dolomites with Cima Palon (the highest peak). Like the surrounding peaks, Mount Priaforà is made up of rocks from the Triassic and Jurassic periods.
