= Golovec District =

District of Ljubljana, Slovenia

Coordinates: 46°02′40″N 14°31′35″E

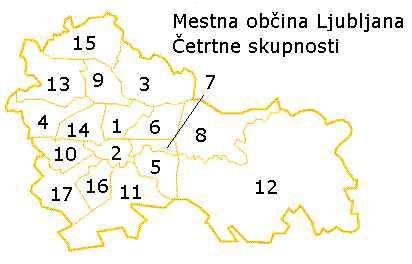
Map of districts in Ljubljana. The Golovec district is number 5.

The Golovec District (Slovene: Četrtna skupnost Golovec), or simply Golovec, is a district (mestna četrt) of the City Municipality of Ljubljana, the capital of Slovenia. It encompasses Golovec Hill, which dates back to the Carboniferous period and consists of clastic rock (siltstone, claystone and sandstone).
