= 53rd Infantry Division "Arezzo" =

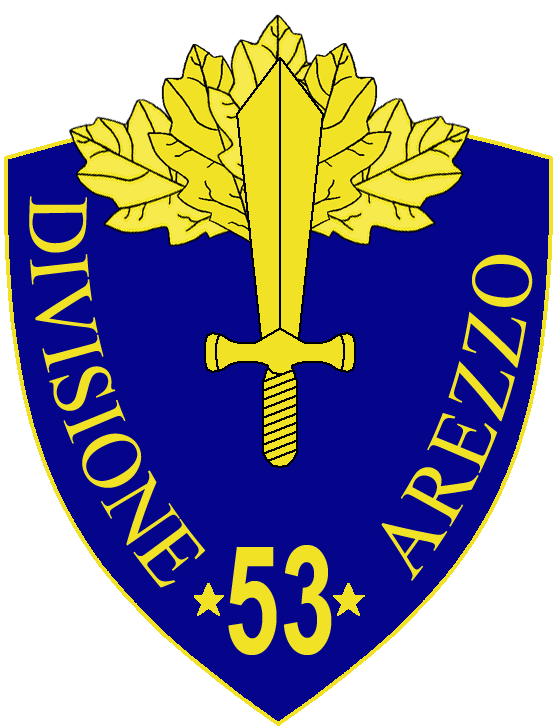
- 53rd Infantry Division "Arezzo" insignia
- Active: 1939–1943
- Country: Kingdom of Italy
- Branch: Royal Italian Army
- Type: Infantry
- Size: Division
- Garrison/HQ: Macerata
- Engagements: World War II

Commanders
- Notable commanders: General Michele Molinari 1940; General Ernesto Ferone 1941

Insignia
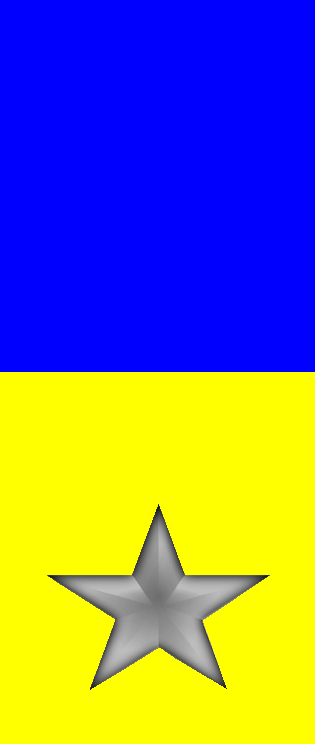
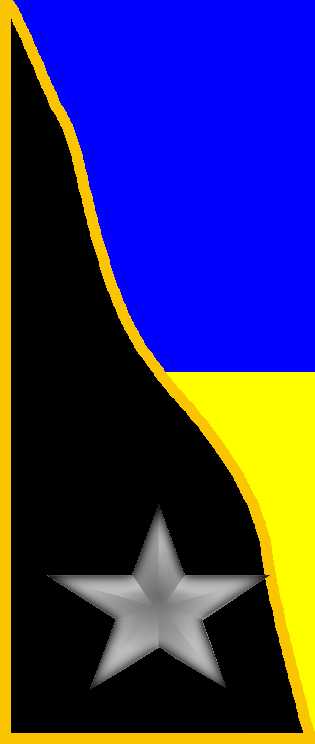
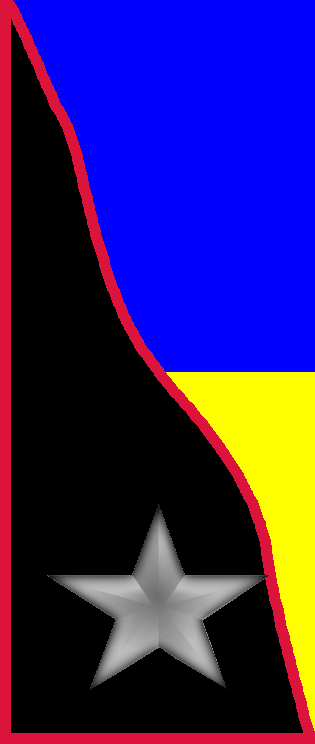
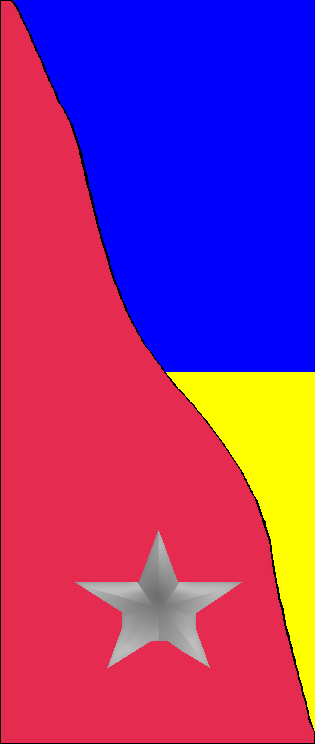
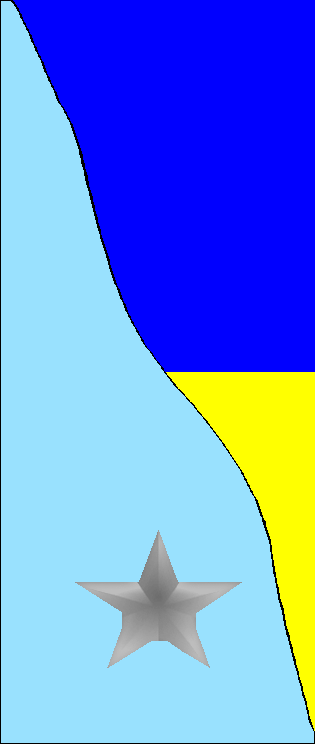
- Identification symbol: Arezzo Division gorget patches

The 53rd Infantry Division "Arezzo" (Italian: 53ª Divisione di fanteria "Arezzo" [aˈrɛttso]) was a infantry division of the Royal Italian Army during World War II. The Arezzo was a mountain-type infantry division, which meant that the division's artillery and logistics were moved by pack mules, while in standard infantry divisions artillery and logistics were moved by horse-drawn limbers and carriages. Italy's real mountain warfare divisions were the six alpine divisions manned by Alpini troops.

The division was formed on 24 May 1939 and named after the city of Arezzo. The division disintegrated on 12 September 1943 after the Armistice of Cassibile between Italy and the Allies was announced. The Arezzo is not related to the Partisan Division "Arezzo", which operated in the Cortona area in Tuscany in 1943.

== History ==
=== World War I ===
The division's lineage begins with the Brigade "Arezzo" established during World War I in Castelfranco Veneto on 18 May 1916. The brigade consisted of the 225th Infantry Regiment and 226th Infantry Regiment, which were manned by reservists. The brigade fought on the Italian front and for their conduct the brigade's two infantry regiments were awarded Italy's highest military honor, the Gold Medal of Military Valor. After the war the regiments raised during the war were dissolved, with the exception of those, who had been awarded a Gold Medal of Military Valor.

On 30 September 1926 the brigade command and 226th Infantry Regiment "Arezzo" were disbanded, while the 225th Infantry Regiment "Arezzo" was assigned to the XXIV Infantry Brigade. On 1 March 1938 the 18th Infantry Division "Matauro" reactivated the 226th Infantry Regiment "Arezzo" in Macerata. On 24 May 1939 the 53rd Infantry Division "Arezzo" was activated in Macerata and was assigned its two namesake infantry regiments and the 53rd Artillery Regiment "Arezzo", which had been reformed by the depot of the 18th Artillery Regiment "Pinerolo".

=== World War II ===
The Arezzo was transferred to Albania in June 1939 and based in Shkodër in the country's North. After the Arezzo had left for Albania the 49th Infantry Division "Parma" was activated on 12 September 1939 and housed in some of the barracks of the Arezzo in mainland Italy. From 30 October 1940 units of the division were sent to the South of Albania to reinforce Italian units fighting the Greco-Italian War. From 20 November the entire division was engaged in combat against Greek forces in the Shkumbin valley. After Greek forces advanced on the Arezzo's right flank the division was forced to retreat on 2 December. The Arezzo suffered serious losses in the fighting between 29 November and 3 December 1940.

From 2 January 1941 Greek forces increased the pressure on the Arezzo, which lost some of its positions. On 10 January the Greeks managed to take more positions of the Arezzo and fighting continued into February. On 20 February 1941 the heavily decimated Arezzo was sent to the rear to be brought back up to strength. In preparation for the Invasion of Yugoslavia the Arezzo moved to the Lake Ohrid area on border with Yugoslavia on 28 March 1941. On 9 April 1941 the Arezzo crossed the border and with the aim of capturing Ohrid and Struga. After fierce fighting the Arezzo captured both cities on 11 April. The division then advanced towards Trebeništa and Vranište.

On 17 April the Arezzo was sent to the Greek front for the Italian second spring offensive. At the war's end the division reached Sarantaporos, where it was engaged in mopping up operations. After the war the Arezzo moved to Korçë in Albania where it performed anti-partisan duties until September 1943. After the announcement of the Armistice of Cassibile on 8 September 1943 the division was disarmed by partisans.

== Organization ==
53rd Infantry Division "Arezzo" organization in 1940

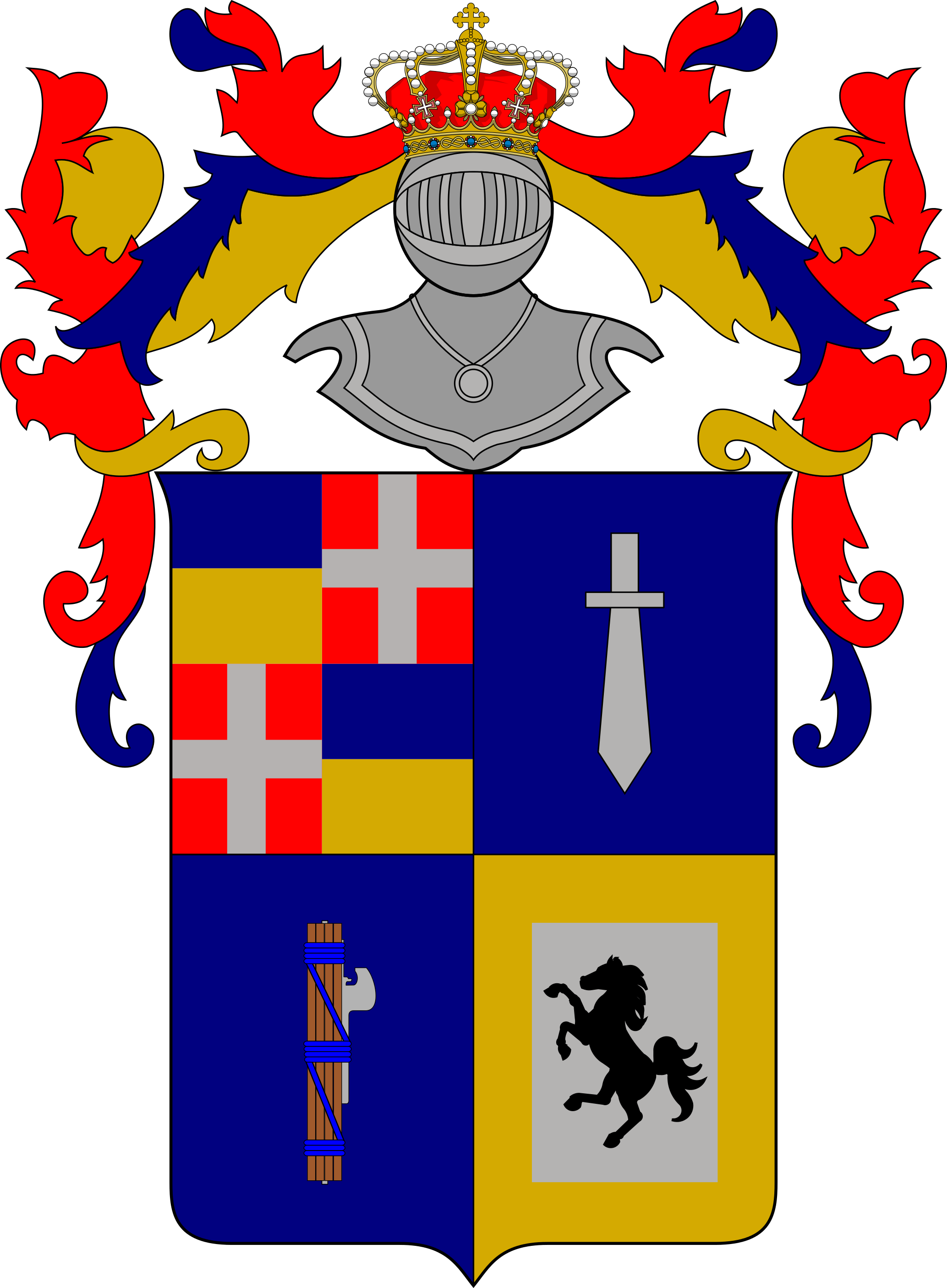
Coat of arms of the 226th Infantry Regiment "Arezzo", 1939

- 53rd Infantry Division "Arezzo", in Macerata
  - Headquarters
    - Command Company
    - 124th Carabinieri Section
    - 267th Carabinieri Section
    - 70th Field Post Office
    - 53rd Infantry Division Command Transport Squad
  - 225th Infantry Regiment "Arezzo", in Ascoli Piceno
    - Command Company
    - 3 × Fusilier battalions
    - Support Weapons Battery (65/17 mod. 13 infantry support guns)
    - Mortar Company (81mm mod. 35 mortars)
  - 226th Infantry Regiment "Arezzo", in Macerata
    - Command Company
    - 3 × Fusilier battalions
    - Support Weapons Battery (65/17 mod. 13 infantry support guns)
    - Mortar Company (81mm mod. 35 mortars)
  - 53rd Artillery Regiment "Arezzo", formed in Chieti and then transferred to Albania
    - Command Unit
    - I Group (75/13 mod. 15 mountain guns)
    - II Group (75/13 mod. 15 mountain guns; exchanged on 31 August 1943 for the II Group with 75/27 mod. 11 field guns of the 41st Artillery Regiment "Firenze")
    - III Group (75/13 mod. 15 mountain guns)
    - 1 × Anti-aircraft battery (20/65 mod. 35 anti-aircraft guns)
    - Ammunition and Supply Unit
  - LIII Mortar Battalion (81mm mod. 35 mortars)
  - 53rd Anti-tank Company (47/32 mod. 35 anti-tank guns)
  - 53rd Telegraph and Radio Operators Company
  - 94th Engineer Company (replaced in Albania by the 150th Engineer Company)
  - 59th Medical Section
  - 60th Supply Section
  - 53rd Autocarrette Section
  - 853rd Transport Section

Attached to the division from 14 November 1940:

- 80th CC.NN. Legion "Farnese"
  - XXVI CC.NN. Battalion
  - LXVII CC.NN. Battalion
  - 80th CC.NN. Machine Gun Company

Attached to the division from 29 January 1943:

- 343rd Infantry Regiment "Forlì", 36th Infantry Division "Forlì"
  - Command Company
  - 3 × Fusilier battalions
  - Cannons Company (47/32 mod. 35 anti-tank guns)
  - Mortar Company (81mm mod. 35 mortars; disbanded in September 1942)

== Commanding officers ==
The division's commanding officers were:

- Generale di Divisione Michele Molinari (24 May 1939 - 15 August 1940)
- Generale di Brigata Ernesto Ferone (16 August 1940 - 4 June 1941)
- Colonel Pietro Tantillo (acting, 5 June - 10 July 1941)
- Colonel Luigi de Pietri Tonelli (acting, 11–31 July 1941)
- Generale di Divisione Carlo Rivolta (1 August 1941 - 25 September 1942)
- Colonel Emilio Bellante (acting, 26 September - 14 October 1942)
- Generale di Brigata Salvatore D'Arminio Monforte (15 October 1942 - 9 August 1943)
- Generale di Divisione Arturo Torriano (10 August 1943 - 8 September 1943)
