= Mediterranean and Middle East theatre of World War II =

Major theatre of operations during the Second World War

Mediterranean and Middle East theatre
- Part of the Second World War
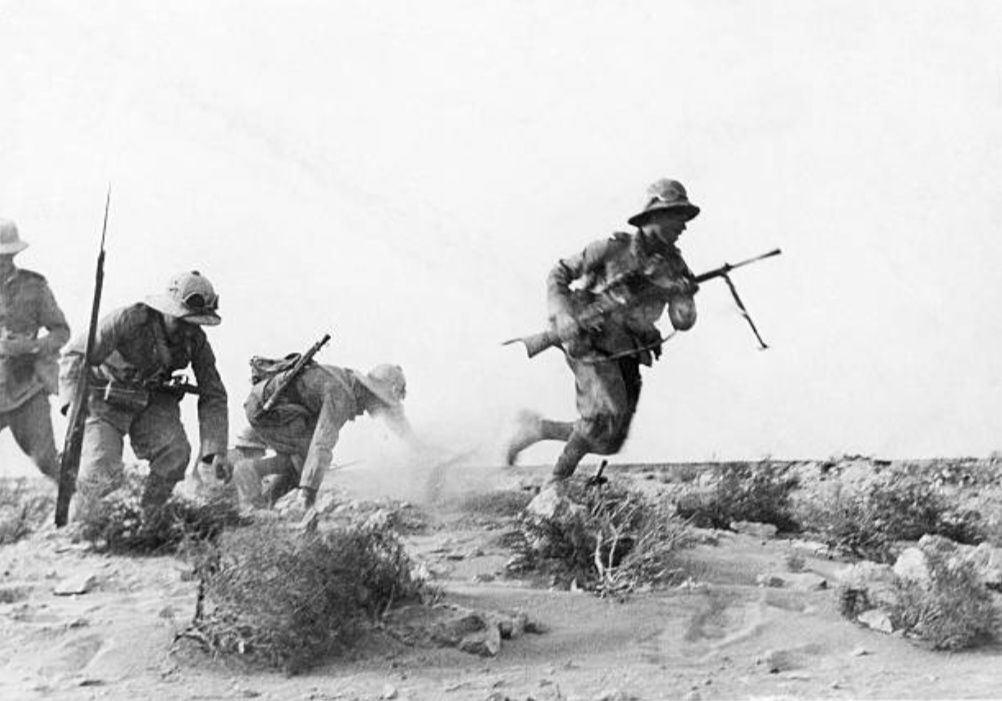
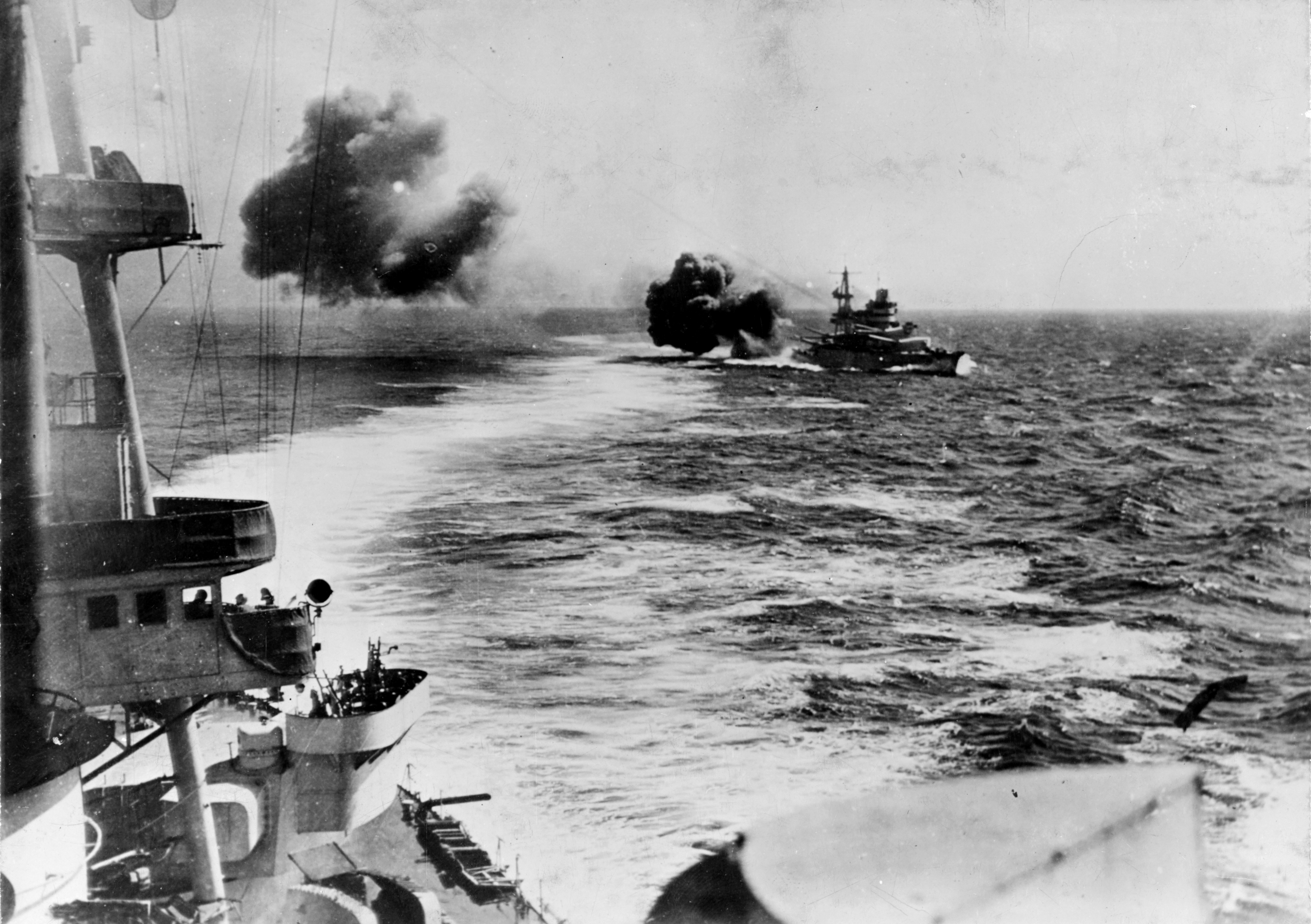
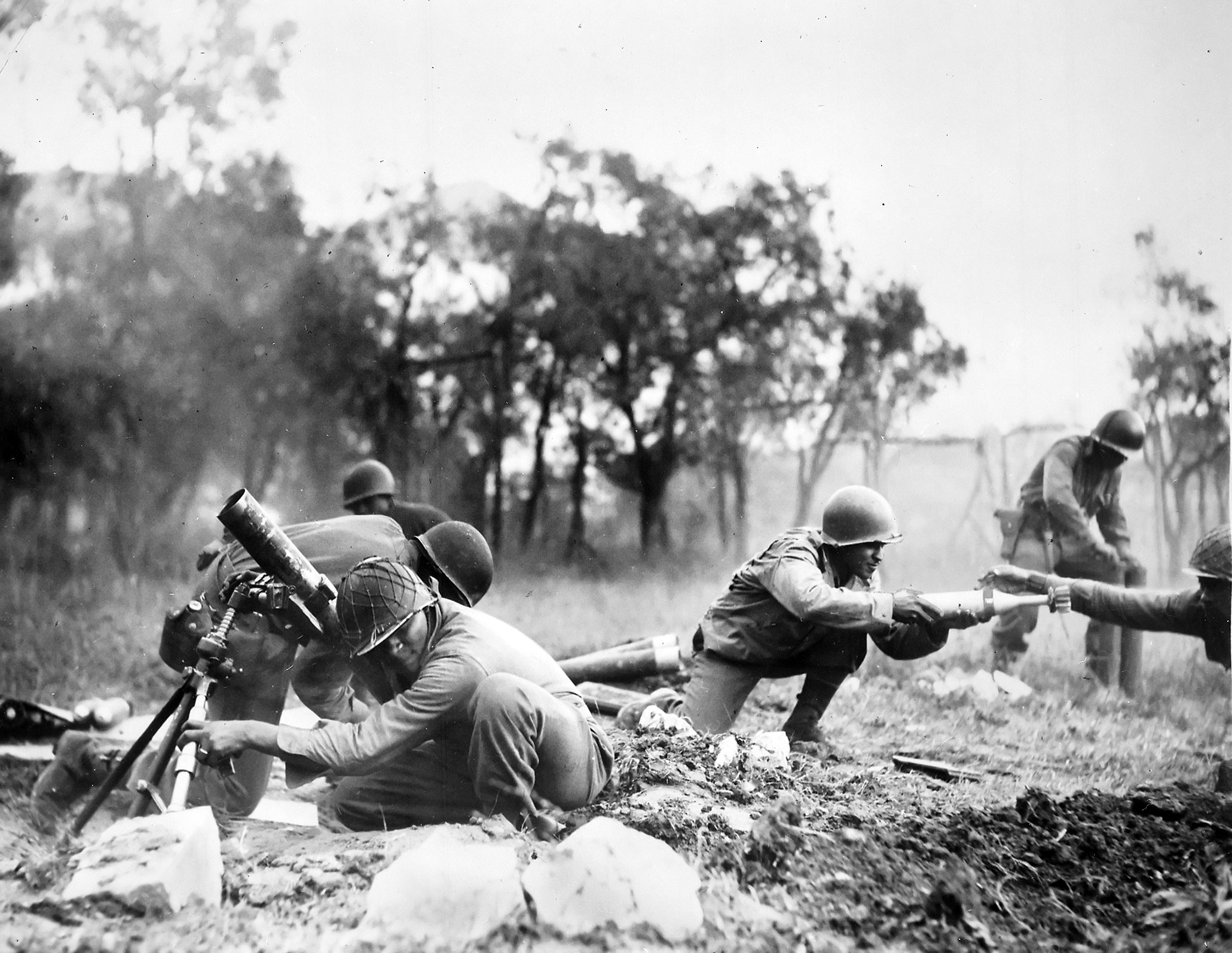
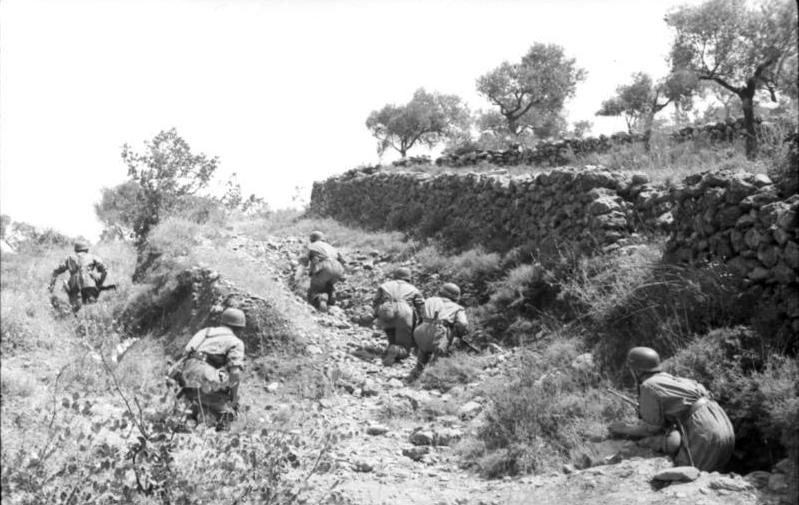
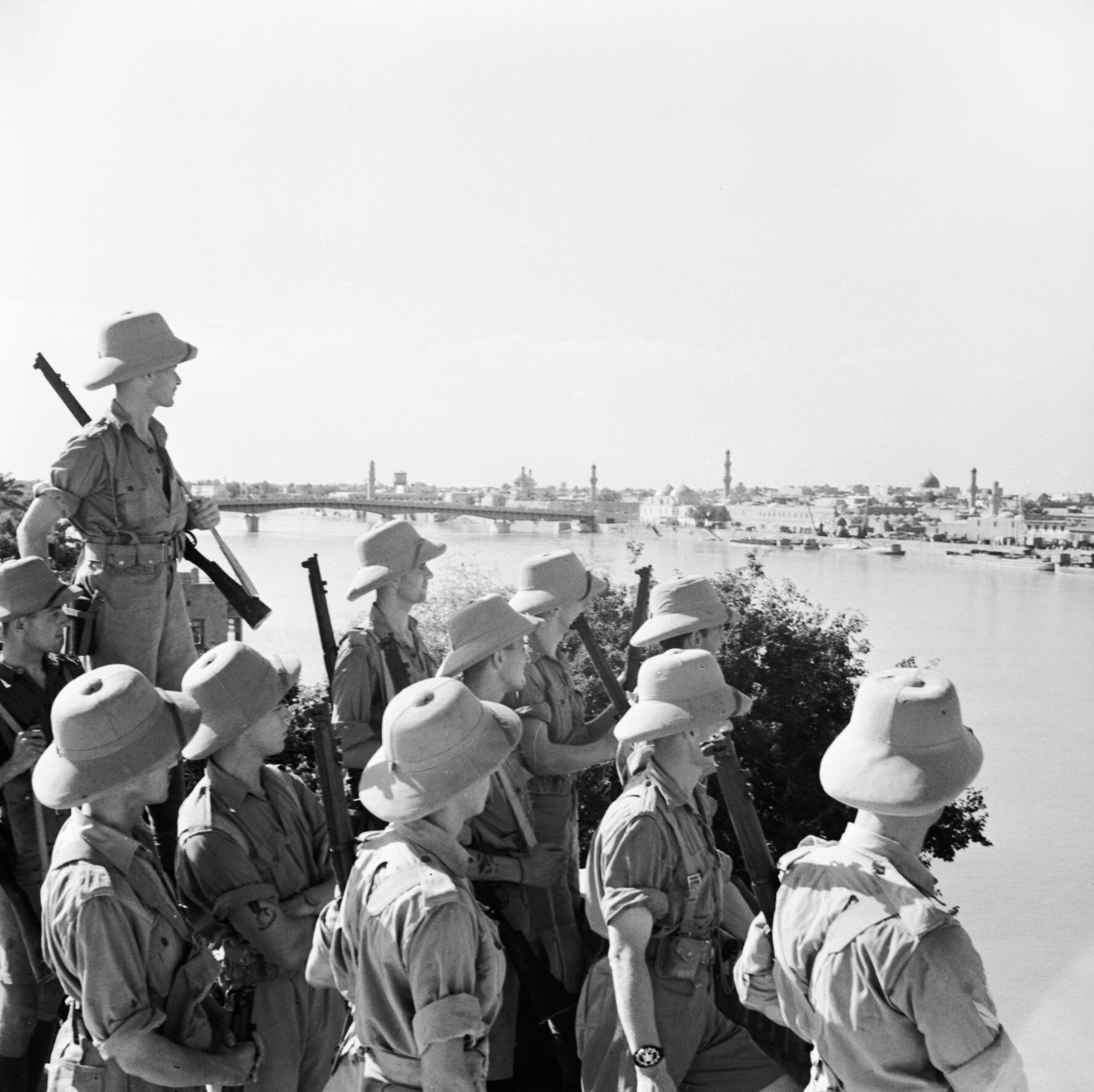
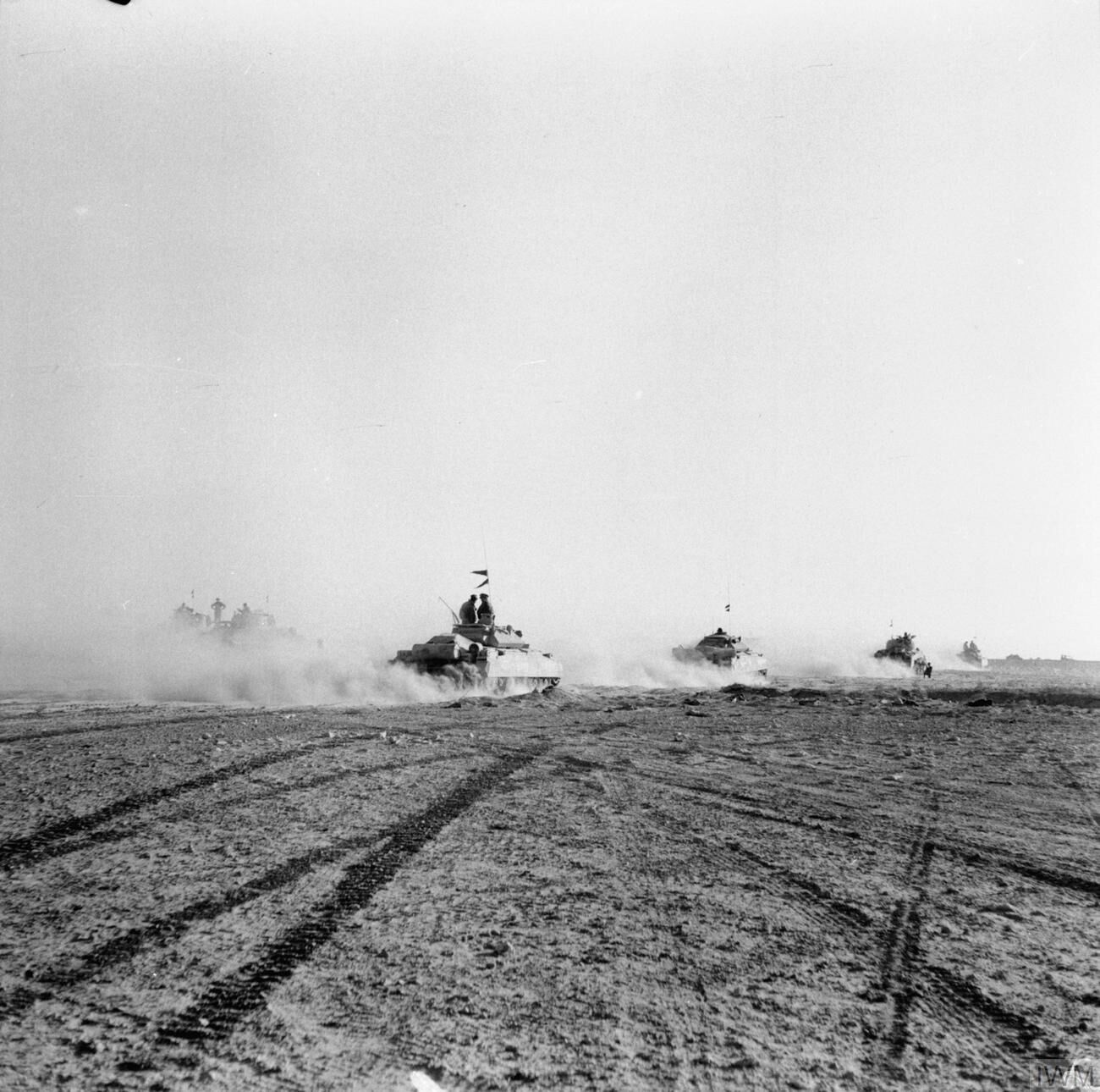
- Clockwise from top left: Italian soldiers charging during the North African campaign, 1941; Italian warships during the Battle of the Mediterranean, 1940; German Fallschirmjägers during the Battle of Crete, 1941; British tanks on the attack in El Alamein, 1942; British troops in Iraq during the Anglo-Iraqi War, 1941; U.S. troops fighting in the Italian campaign, 1944.
| Date | 10 June 1940 – 25 May 1945 (Note: Germany unconditionally surrendered on 8 May 1945 but Croatia still fought until the end of the Battle of Odžak on 25 May.) (4 years, 11 months, 2 weeks and 1 day) |
| Location | Southern Europe, the Middle East, East Africa, North Africa 35°N 18°E |
| Result | Allied victory |
| Territorial changes | Italy relinquishes all its African colonies to the Allies; Ethiopian and Albanian independence restored; Province of Ljubljana and Governorate of Dalmatia ceded to Yugoslavia; Dodecanese ceded to Greece |

Belligerents
| Allies: British Empire; United Kingdom; Newfoundland; India; (Kingdom of Nepal) Gurkhas; Australia (until 1942); New Zealand; Cyprus; Malta; Transjordan; Br. Somaliland (1940, 1941–1945); Palestine; Palmach; Yishuv; (United Kingdom) Sudan (Note: Condominium between the United Kingdom and Egypt.); Kenya; Nigeria; Gold Coast; Northern Rhodesia; Southern Rhodesia; Uganda; Nyasaland; Bahrain; Muscat and Oman; (Aden Colony) Aden; Kuwait Protectorate; Qatar Protectorate; Trucial States; Gibraltar; Iraq Levies; Libyan Arab Force (1940–1943); Jewish Brigade (from 1944); SOE; Balkan Air Force (from 1944); United States (from 1941); French Empire (1940, 1942–1945) (Note: After the Battle of France in June 1940, the French colonies were given to the French state (the german puppet state in mainland France). throughout the war, the allies and Free French Forces liberated the French colonies from the Axis and Free French governance of the colonies was restored.); FTR (1940); Free France (1940–1944); French resistance (Note: Formalised as French Forces of the Interior after June 1944.); PGFR (1944–1945); Algeria (1940, 1942–1945); Morocco (1940, 1942–1945); Tunisia (1940, 1942–1945); Syria (1940, 1941–1945); Lebanon (1940, 1941–1943); Equatorial Africa; Fr. Somaliland (1940, 1942–1945); French West Africa (1940, 1942–1945); Soviet Union (from June 1941); Greece (from October 1940); Greek resistance (Note: The Greek resistance started operations in April 1941.) (Note: In December 1944, two months after the withdrawal of the Axis forces in Athens was completed in October 1944, armed clashes between the Papandreou government in Greece along with the British Army against EAM (a former Greek resistance group) started and would last until January 1945.); GGIE (1940–1944); GAFITME; Yugoslavia (Kingdom) (from April 1941); YGIE (1941–1945); YAOTF; Yugoslavia (DF) (from November 1943); Yugoslav Partisans (Note: The Yugoslav partisans started operations in July 1941.); Chetniks (from May–November 1941) (Note: Lost Allied support in 1943.); Australia (from 1942); Canada; South Africa; Poland; PAFITW; Czechoslovakia; Netherlands; Belgian Empire; Belgium; Congo; Ruanda-Urundi; Norway; Ethiopia (from 1941); Arbegnoch (Note: the Arbegnoch started operations in 1936 and ended operations with the end of the East African campaign in 1941.); Iraq (Abd Al-Ilah loyalists) (1941); Iraq (from January 1943); Iran (from September 1943); Brazil (from 1944); Albania (from October 1944); LANÇ (Note: LANÇ started operations in December 1941); Balli Kombëtar (from November 1942–October 1943); Legality Movement (from 1941–1943); Northern Epirus Liberation Front (from 1942–1944); Lebanon (from 1943); Turkey (from 1945); Egypt (from 1945); (United Kingdom) Sudan; Saudi Arabia (from 1945) (Note: Saudi Arabia was bombed by the Kingdom of Italy during the Bombing of Bahrain on 19 October 1940.); Co-belligerents: Italy (from September 1943) (Note: Italy declared war against Germany in October 1943.); Italian Resistance; CLN; CLNAI (from 1944); Italian partisan republics (1944); Italian partisan brigades; Czech deserters (from 1944) (Note: In May 1944, eleven out of the total twelve battalion strong Protectorate Government Army (5,002 soldiers, including 272 officers) were moved to northern Italy to support German military operations there. Responsibilities were limited to a passive role in the construction of fortifications and field positions. Approximately 600 soldiers deserted to the Italian partisans, due in part to the effects of the propaganda campaign Operation Sauerkraut of the US Office of Strategic Services.); Kingdom of the South (1943–1944); Co-belligerent Army; Bulgaria (from September 1944) | Axis: Italian Empire (1940–1943); Italy; Libya (until 1943); East Africa (until 1941); Albania (until 1943); Croatia (1941–1943) (Note: As a protectorate.); Montenegro (1941–1943); Hellenic State (1941–1943) (Note: Joint puppet state of Germany and Italy.); Sandžak Muslim militia (1941–1943); Germany; SHG (from 1943); Montenegrin Volunteer Corps (from 1944); Free Arabian Legion (from 1941); Sandžak Muslim militia (from 1943); OZAV (from September 1943); OZAK (from September 1943); Kosakenland (Kazachi Stan) (from July 1944); Këshilla (from 1943); Russian Liberation Army (from 1944); (Russia) Russian Protective Corps (from 1941); Hungary (1940–1944) (Note: Participated in the Invasion of Yugoslavia.); Romania (1940–1944) (Note: Participated in Operation Achse.); Bulgaria (1941–1944); Axis puppet states and regimes: Italian Social Republic (from 1943); National Republican Army; Croatia (from 1941) (Note: Puppet state of only Germany from 1943.); Montenegrin National Army (1945); Bohemia and Moravia; Albania (1943–1944); Hellenic State (1941–1944) (Note: Even though the puppet government in Greece ended in October 1944 with the Liberation of Greece, remnants of the Security Battalions continued to fight for the Axis and even fought in Operation Winterende in 1945.); Security Battalions (1943–1944); Serbia (1941–1944) (Note: Even though the puppet government in Serbia ended in October 1944 after the Belgrade offensive, remnants of its paramilitary groups continued to fight for the Axis and even fought in the Race for Trieste in May 1945.); Pećanac Chetniks (from 1941–1943); (Government of National Salvation) Serbian Volunteer Corps; Serbian State Guard (from 1942); Montenegro (1943–1944); Szálasi government (from October 1944) (Note: In October 1944, due to the possibility of Hungary joining the allies, Germany and the Hungarian Arrow Cross Party started Operation Panzerfaust and removed Regent Miklós Horthy from power. After the operation, the Government of National Unity was formed with Ferenc Szálasi becoming the Prime Minister. and Hungary continued the war against the allies with Germany. Hungary also continued to occupy the Yugoslav territory of Prekmurje until the end of the war.); Co-belligerents: French State (and empire) (1940–1942) (Note: While the French State was under Axis military occupation after 1942, the collaborationist government led by Philippe Pétain and Pierre Laval remained in power at Vichy with Vichy government officials deporting jews to concentration camps and fighting against the French resistance until the Liberation of France in September 1944.); Algeria (1940–1942); Morocco (1940–1942); Tunisia (1940–1942); Syria (1940–1941); Lebanon (1940–1941); Equatorial Africa (1940); Fr. Somaliland (1940–1942); French West Africa (1940–1942); Iraq (Golden Square) (May 1941); Iran (August 1941); Chetniks (from November 1941); Balli Kombëtar (from October 1943–1945); Legality Movement (from 1943); Second League of Prizren (from 1943); Ohrana (until 1944); Këshilla (until 1943); Roman Legion (1941–1943) |

Commanders and leaders
| (United Kingdom) Winston Churchill (United States) Franklin D. Roosevelt # (United States) Harry S. Truman (Free France) (Provisional Government of the French Republic) Charles De Gaulle (Soviet Union) Joseph Stalin (Kingdom of Yugoslavia) Dušan Simović (Democratic Federal Yugoslavia) Josip Broz Tito (Kingdom of Greece) Emmanouil Tsouderos (Kingdom of Greece) Georgios Papandreou (Jordan) Abdullah I (Kingdom of Iraq) Nuri al-Said (Kingdom of Iraq) Abd al-Ilah (Pahlavi Iran) Mohammad Reza Pahlavi (1943–45); Enver Hoxha (Ethiopian Empire) Haile Selassie (Estado Novo (Brazil)) Getúlio Vargas (Turkey) İsmet İnönü (Kingdom of Egypt) Farouk I (First Syrian Republic) Shukri al-Kuwatli (Kingdom of Italy) Pietro Badoglio (Tsardom of Bulgaria (1908–1946)) Kimon Georgiev | (Kingdom of Italy) (Italian Social Republic) Benito Mussolini (executed) (Nazi Germany) Adolf Hitler ‡‡ (Kingdom of Hungary (1920–1946)) Miklós Horthy (Kingdom of Romania) Ion Antonescu (executed) (Tsardom of Bulgaria (1908–1946)) Boris III # (Tsardom of Bulgaria (1908–1946)) Bogdan Filov (executed) (Independent State of Croatia) Ante Pavelić (Government of National Salvation) Milan Nedić ‡‡ (Vichy France) Philippe Petain (Vichy France) Pierre Laval (executed) (Kingdom of Iraq) Rashid Ali al-Gaylani (May 1941) (Pahlavi Iran) Reza Shah Pahlavi (August 1941) |

The Mediterranean and Middle East theatre, also known as the Mediterranean Theater of War, and described as Mediterranean, South-East Europe, and North Africa 1939–1941 in Germany military history, was a major theatre of operations during the Second World War. It saw interconnected land, naval, and air campaigns fight for control of the Mediterranean Sea, North Africa, the Horn of Africa, the Middle East and Southern Europe. Despite their disparate geographic locations and objectives, these operations were not seen as neatly separated from each other, but part of an extensive, contiguous theatre of war.

The Mediterranean theater had the longest duration of the Second World War. (Note: While the fighting around the Mediterranean formed the longest fought over theatre of war during the Second World War, the Battle of the Atlantic was fought from 1939 to 1945, the war's longest continuous military campaign.) Combat started on 10 June 1940 with Italy's declaration of war against the United Kingdom and France and ended on 2 May 1945 when all Axis forces in Italy surrendered. Various post-war conflicts, such as the Greek Civil War and the first phase of the Palestine War, were rooted in events during the Mediterranean theater.

The Mediterranean theatre was initially driven by Italian aspirations to establish a new Roman Empire, while the Allies aimed to retain the status quo. Immediately following its declaration of war, Italy invaded France, bombed Malta, and attacked Allied ships. Italian forces invaded Greece in October 1940—with little initial success—requiring German intervention to conquer it by April 1941; Yugoslavia was invaded and occupied by Axis forces the same month. Allied and Axis forces fought across North Africa, while Axis interference in the Middle East caused fighting to spread as far as Palestine, Iraq, and Iran.

With confidence high from early gains, German forces planned to capture the Middle East with a view to possibly attacking the Soviet Union from the south. Devastating losses in Egypt and Tunisia stopped the Axis threat in North Africa by May 1943. The Allies then invaded Italy, resulting in an armistice and subsequent civil war. A prolonged battle for Italy commenced between Allied and Axis forces, supported by the Allied-aligned Kingdom of Italy in the south and Axis-aligned Italian Social Republic in the north, lasting until 2 May 1945 with the Surrender at Caserta.

The Mediterranean and Middle East theatre resulted in the destruction of the Italian Empire and the weakening of Germany's strategic position, as German forces had been diverted from the Western and Eastern fronts and suffered over two million losses (including those captured upon final surrender). Italy lost around 177,000 men, with a further several hundred thousand captured throughout the duration of the theatre. British losses amounted to 300,000 men killed, wounded, or captured, while total American losses were around 130,000.

== Background ==
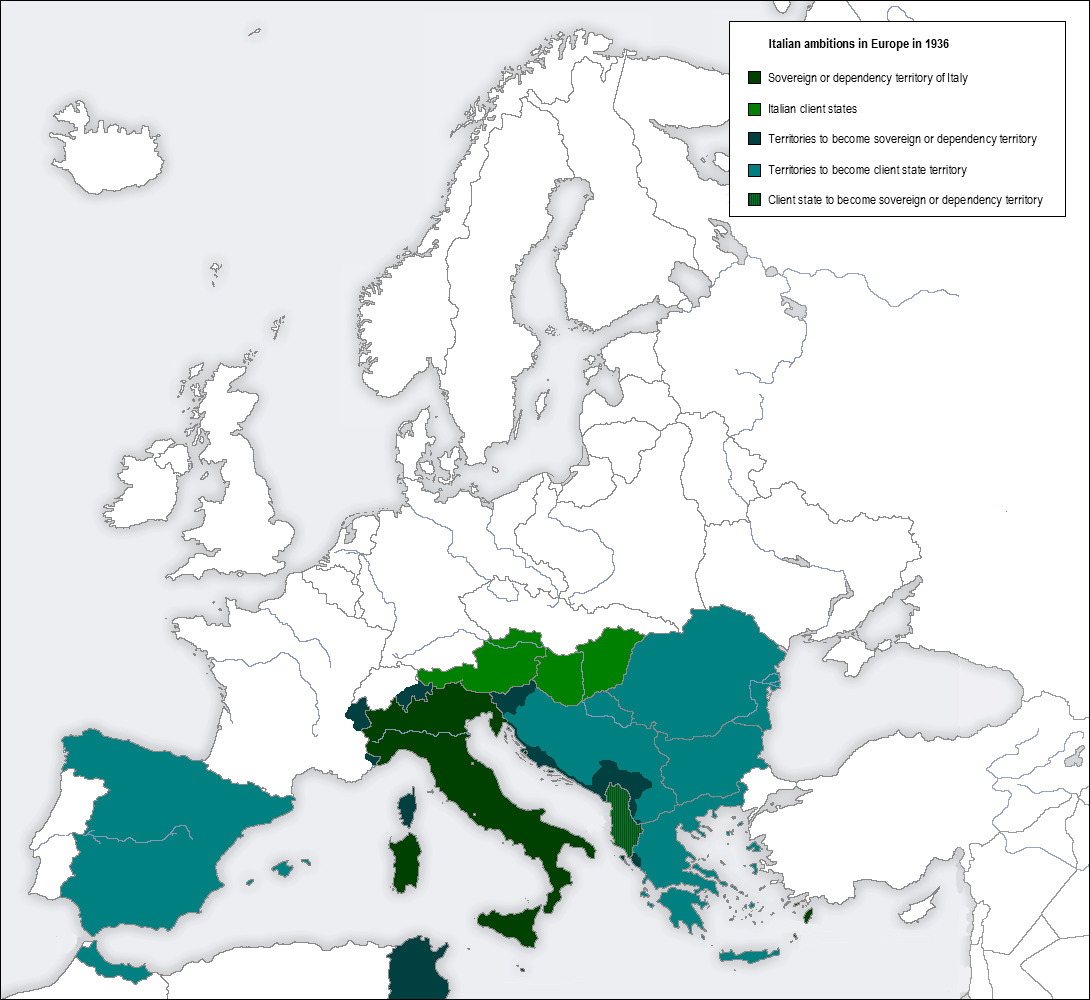
Ambitions of Fascist Italy in Europe in 1936. Legend: Metropolitan Italy and dependent territories; Client states; Claimed territories to be annexed; Territories to be transformed into client states. Albania, which was a client state, was considered a territory to be annexed.

=== Italy ===
During the late 1920s, Benito Mussolini claimed that Italy needed an outlet for its "surplus population" and that it would be in other countries' best interests to aid in this expansion. The regime wanted "hegemony in the Mediterranean–Danubian–Balkan region" and the gaining of world power by the conquest "of an empire stretching from the Strait of Gibraltar to the Strait of Hormuz". The Fascists had designs on Albania, Dalmatia, large parts of Slovenia, Croatia, Bosnia and Herzegovina, Macedonia and Greece and harked back to the Roman Empire. The regime also sought to establish protectorates with Austria, Hungary, Romania and Bulgaria. Covert motives were for Italy to become the dominant power in the Mediterranean, capable of challenging France or Britain and gaining access to the Atlantic and Indian Oceans.

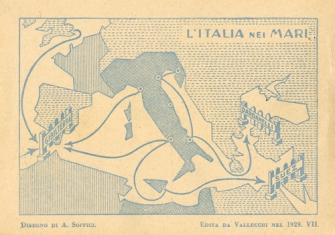
A 1929 postcard made by Ardengo Soffici

On 30 November 1938, Mussolini addressed the Fascist Grand Council on the goal of capturing Albania, Tunisia, Corsica, the Ticino canton of Switzerland, and "French territory east of the River Var (to include Nice, but not Savoy)". Mussolini alleged that Italy required uncontested access to the oceans and shipping lanes to ensure its national sovereignty. Italy was a "prisoner in the Mediterranean" and had to break the chains of British and French control. Corsica, Cyprus, Gibraltar, Malta, Suez and Tunisia would need to be taken and Egypt, France, Greece, Turkey and the United Kingdom had to be challenged. Through armed conquest, the north and east African colonies would be linked and this 'prison' destroyed. Italy would be able to march "either to the Indian Ocean through the Sudan and Abyssinia, or to the Atlantic by way of French North Africa".

On 2 October 1935, the Second Italo–Ethiopian War began when Italian forces invaded Abyssinia. Mussolini lauded the conquest as a new source of raw materials and location for emigration and speculated that a native army could be raised there to "help conquer the Sudan. "Almost as soon as the Abyssinian campaign ended, Italian intervention in the Spanish Civil War" began. On 7 April 1939, Mussolini began the Italian invasion of Albania and within two days had occupied the country. In May 1939, Italy formally allied to Nazi Germany in the Pact of Steel.

Italian foreign policy went through two stages during the Fascist regime. Until 1934–35, Mussolini followed a "modest ... and responsible" course and following that date there was "ceaseless activity and aggression". "Prior to the Italian invasion of Ethiopia, Mussolini had made military agreements with the French and formed a coalition with the British and French to prevent German aggression in Europe." The Ethiopian War "exposed vulnerabilities and created opportunities that Mussolini seized to realise his imperial vision"

=== Britain ===
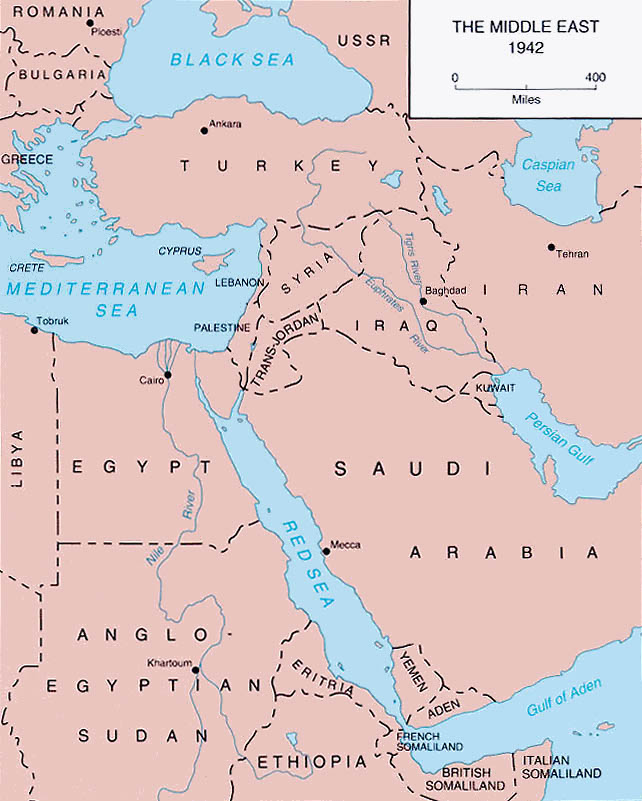
Middle East Command

At the Nyon Conference of 1937, Italy and the United Kingdom "disclaimed any desire to modify or see modified the national sovereignty of any country in the Mediterranean area, and agreed to discourage any activities liable to impair mutual relations." Italian diplomatic and military moves did not reflect this agreement. In the aftermath of the Italian invasion of Abyssinia, British and Italian forces in North Africa were reinforced. Due to various Italian moves, in July 1937, the British decided "that Italy could not now be regarded as a reliable friend" and preparations began to bring "the defences of the Mediterranean and the Red Sea ports up-to-date". In 1938, a weak armoured division was established in Egypt and further army and air force reinforcements were dispatched from Britain.

With rising tension in Europe, in June 1939, the United Kingdom established Middle East Command (MEC) in Cairo to provide centralised command for British army units in the Mediterranean and Middle East theatre. All three branches of the British military were made equally responsible for the defence of the area. The authority of MEC included Aden, British Somaliland, Cyprus, Egypt, Eritrea, Ethiopia, Kenya, Greece, Libya, Palestine, Iraq, Sudan, Tanganyika, Transjordan, Uganda and the shores of the Persian Gulf. If necessary, command would be exerted as far away as the Caucasus and the Indian Ocean. The purpose of the command was to be "the western bastion of defence of India", keep British supply lines open to India and the Far East, and keep the Middle Eastern oilfields out of Axis hands.

Upon the establishment of MEC, it was ordered to co-ordinate with the French military in the Middle East and Africa as well as liaise with the Turkish General Staff and possibly the Greek General Staff. On 19 October 1939, the Treaty of Mutual Assistance was signed between the United Kingdom, France and Turkey and British military forces were authorised to begin discussions with the Turkish general staff; a further conference was held during March 1940. Within a week of the Italian occupation of Albania, France and the United Kingdom "announced they had promised to give all the help in their power if Greek and Romanian independence were threatened and if the Greek Government or Romanian Government considered it vital to resist."

British forces in the Middle East were ordered to avoid provocation. Following the defeat of Poland, the threat of an Axis attack from the Balkans against British positions in the Middle East and Eastern Mediterranean region increased. In late 1939, with the assumption that Britain would soon be at war with Italy, planning began for attacks to capture Bardia and Jaghbub (Giarabub) in Libya and arrangements began in Egypt, to accommodate a much larger force. Preparations to reinforce the Iraqi army were made and Palestinian security forces were to be reduced to the minimum. British forces in East Africa were to study operations to destroy the Italian forces and support local risings, all in support of the main Allied offensive, which was planned to be launched from French Somaliland. Troops in Sudan were also asked to consider launching operations against Kufra in southern Libya.

== Initial military operations ==
France during the war; occupied and annexed zones by Germany in shades of red, Italian occupation zones in shades of yellow and striped blue, "free zone" in blue.

On 10 June 1940, Italy declared war on France and the United Kingdom and next day the British Commonwealth declared war on Italy. The fleets of Italy, France and the United Kingdom began the hostilities of the Battle of the Mediterranean. The siege of Malta soon began, with the first Italian air attack on 11 June. In the Western Desert, Royal Air Force (RAF) aircraft attacked Italian positions inside Libya. On 11 June, the Western Desert Campaign began, as the British launched minor raids and conducted patrols along the Libyan–Egyptian border and on 17 June, Fort Capuzzo was captured. On 20 June, Mussolini began the Italian invasion of France, just before the end of the Battle of France. During June, the East African Campaign began with Italian attacks in East Africa, although ground combat did not start until July.

On 22 June, France signed an armistice at Compiegne with Germany and on 24 June, the Franco-Italian Armistice was signed. Italy gained a 50 kilometres (31 mi) demilitarised zone inside France (as well as similar zones where Italian and French colonies met). Italian occupation forces took over an 832 km^{2} (321 mi^{2}) area of France, which included 28,500 people and the town of Menton. The Royal Navy attacked the French fleet in the North African port of Mers-el-Kébir on 3 July 1940, after it refused to sail to Britain or the French West Indies and demobilise, as part of a larger plan to stop the French fleet from falling into German or Italian hands.

When Italy entered the war, there were no plans for an invasion of Egypt while France was still able to resist. When France surrendered, Mussolini gave instructions for his generals to prepare an offensive. On 10 August, he instructed his forces to be prepared to attack in conjunction with the German invasion of the United Kingdom. While his generals did not believe they were prepared, they were ordered to push forward without any solid objectives.

On 9 September, Italian aircraft start preparation bombardments for the invasion of Egypt. Four days later, Italian forces invaded Egypt as far as Sidi Barrani before digging in, 80 mi (130 km) west of the main British position at Mersa Matruh. In East Africa, after some initial offensive actions, the Italian conquest of British Somaliland began in August and annexed the colony. After crossing the Albanian border, Italian forces began the Greco-Italian War by invading Greece on 28 October. The Greek army repulsed the Italian attack and commenced a counter-offensive on 14 November, which pushed Italian forces back into Albania.

The British and Italian fleets began a series of engagements on the Mediterranean, such as the Battle of Calabria, Espero Convoy, Cape Spada, and Cape Spartivento. The Royal Navy inflicted a major setback upon the Italian Royal Navy during the Battle of Taranto on the night of 12/13 November. After assembling enough forces the British launched a counter-attack upon the Italians in Egypt. Operation Compass drove the Italians out of Egypt and resulted in the destruction of the Italian 10th Army in February 1941. Following this success, British forces adopted a defensive position in North Africa and redeployed most troops to Greece in Operation Lustre, leaving a weak force garrisoning the gains made from Operation Compass. In March, the Battle of Kufra ended with the Italians losing the desert oasis of Kufra—a vital link between Italian east and north Africa—which was located in south-eastern Libya.

== Axis success ==
Italy and its colonies before WWII are shown in red. Pink areas were annexed for various periods between 1940 and 1943 (Tientsin concession in China is not shown)

=== North Africa ===
In North Africa, the Italians responded to the defeat of their Tenth Army by dispatching armour and motorised divisions. Germany dispatched the Afrika Korps in Operation Sonnenblume, to bolster the Italians with a mission to block further Allied attempts to drive the Italians out of the region. Its commander was General Erwin Rommel and Rommel himself was subordinated to the Italian command. But Rommel seized on the weakness of his opponents and without waiting for his forces to fully assemble, rapidly went on the offensive. In March–April 1941, the German and Italian forces defeated the British forces and forced the British and Commonwealth forces into retreat.

The Australian 9th Infantry Division fell back to the fortress port of Tobruk and the remaining British and Commonwealth forces withdrew a further 100 mi (160 km) east to Sollum on the Libyan–Egyptian border. The main Axis force began the Siege of Tobruk, and a small German force pressed eastwards, retaking all territory lost to Operation Compass, and advanced into Egypt. By the end of April, Sollum had fallen and the important Halfaya Pass captured.

=== East Africa ===
In East Africa, the British launched a counter-attack against the Italians from Kenya Colony and Sudan through Somaliland, Eritrea and Ethiopia in 1940 and early 1941. Landings were subsequently conducted in British Somaliland and Italian Ethiopia, while an expedition from the Sudan moved on Addis Ababa. The Italian Viceroy, Duke Amedeo d'Aosta, was forced to surrender by 18 May which effectively ended the campaign, allowing the Empire of Ethiopia to be re-established under Haile Selassie. A number of Italian garrisons continued to hold out, but the last of these, at Gondar, surrendered in November. Small groups of Italian troops carried out the Italian guerrilla war in Ethiopia until October 1943.

=== Balkans ===
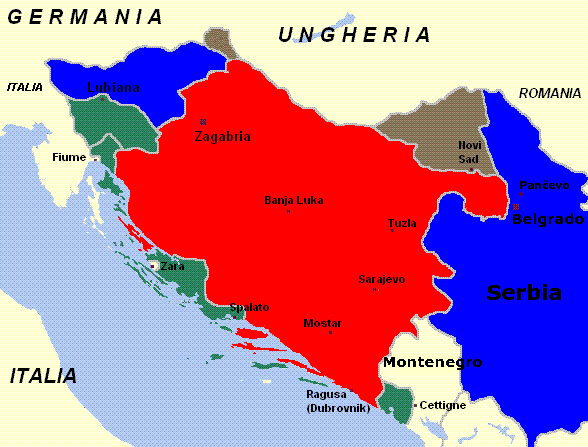
Division of Yugoslavia after its invasion by the Axis powers. Areas annexed by Italy: the area constituting the province of Ljubljana, the area merged with the province of Fiume and the areas making up the Governorate of Dalmatia Independent State of Croatia Area occupied by Nazi Germany Areas occupied by Kingdom of Hungary

Map of Axis and Allied formations before the Invasion of Yugoslavia.

In the Balkans, the Greeks had been reluctant to allow British troops into the country, because Britain could not spare enough forces to guarantee victory. They had, however, accepted aid from the RAF in their war with the Italians in Albania. As it became likely Germany would attack Greece, four British divisions were switched from North Africa to reinforce Greek Army. The advanced guards of these troops began arriving in March 1941, triggering the entry of German forces into Bulgaria, which made clear the German intent to invade Greece.

In April 1941, the Axis forces invaded Yugoslavia. They captured Yugoslavia in 11 days and partitioned it among themselves and newly formed client states: The Independent State of Croatia and Nedić's Serbia. In spring 1941, Italy created a Montenegrin client state and annexed most of the Dalmatian coast as the Governorship of Dalmatia (Governatorato di Dalmazia). A complex guerrilla uprising of communist-led Partisans, commanded by Josip Broz Tito, soon broke out. A more ambivalent, predominantly Serb paramilitary movement of royalist Chetniks both fought the occupying forces and collaborated with them against the communists. The Yugoslav partisans eventually gained recognition from the Allies as the sole resistance movement. With help from both the Soviets and the Western Allies, they turned into a formidable fighting force and successfully liberated the country.

Following the Italian invasion on 28 October 1940, which is usually known as the Greco-Italian War, the Greek forces, with British air and material support, repelled the initial Italian attack and a counter-offensive in March 1941. When the German invasion, known as Operation Marita, began on 6 April, the bulk of the Greek Army was on Albania fighting against the Italian forces and only six Greek divisions were only deployed to defend the Metaxas Line in case of a looming German invasion.

German troops invaded Greece from Bulgaria, creating a second front. Greece received a small reinforcement from British, Australian and New Zealand forces in anticipation of the German attack. While the Italians had launched a second spring offensive in Albania forcing the Greeks to retreat back to mainland Greece. The Greek army found itself outnumbered in its effort to defend against both German and Italian forces. As a result, the Metaxas defensive line did not receive adequate troop reinforcements and was quickly overrun by the Germans, who then outflanked the Greek forces at the Albanian border, forcing their surrender. British, Australian and New Zealand forces were overwhelmed and forced to retreat, with the ultimate goal of evacuation.

After moving through south-eastern Yugoslavia, the Germans had been able to turn the Allied flank, cutting off Greek units in the east of the country. Greek forces in central Macedonia were isolated from the Commonwealth forces moving up in an attempt stabilise the front, with the Germans then falling on the rear of the main Greek army facing the Italians in Macedonia. The German advance into Greece was made easier because the bulk of the Greek Army was engaged fighting the Italians on the Albanian front in the north of the country.

The Greeks were forced to capitulate, ending resistance on the mainland by the end of the month. Abandoning most of its equipment, the Commonwealth force retreated to the island of Crete. From 20 May, the Germans attacked the island by using paratroops to secure an air bridgehead despite suffering heavy casualties. They then flew in more troops and were able to capture the rest of the island by 1 June. With their victory in the Battle of Crete the Germans had secured their southern flank and turned their attention towards the Soviet Union.

Hitler later blamed the failure of his invasion of the Soviet Union on Mussolini's failed conquest of Greece. Andreas Hillgruber has accused Hitler of trying to deflect blame for his country's defeat from himself to his ally, Italy. It nevertheless had serious consequences for the Axis war effort in the North African theatre. Enno von Rintelen, who was the military attaché in Rome, emphasises, from the German point of view, the strategic mistake of not taking Malta.

== Middle East operations ==
=== Iraq ===
When Italy entered the war, the Iraqi government did not break off diplomatic relations, as they had done with Germany. The Italian Legation in Baghdad became the centre for Axis propaganda and for fomenting anti-British feeling. In this they were aided by Mohammad Amin al-Husayni, the British appointee as the Grand Mufti of Jerusalem, who had fled from the British Mandate of Palestine shortly before the outbreak of war and later received asylum in Baghdad. In January 1941, there was a political crisis within Iraq as Rashid Ali resigned as Prime Minister of Iraq and was replaced by Taha al-Hashimi; civil war loomed. On 31 March, the Regent of Iraq, Prince 'Abd al-Ilah, learnt of a plot to arrest him and fled Baghdad for RAF Habbaniya, from whence he was flown to Basra and given refuge on the Insect-class gunboat HMS Cockchafer.

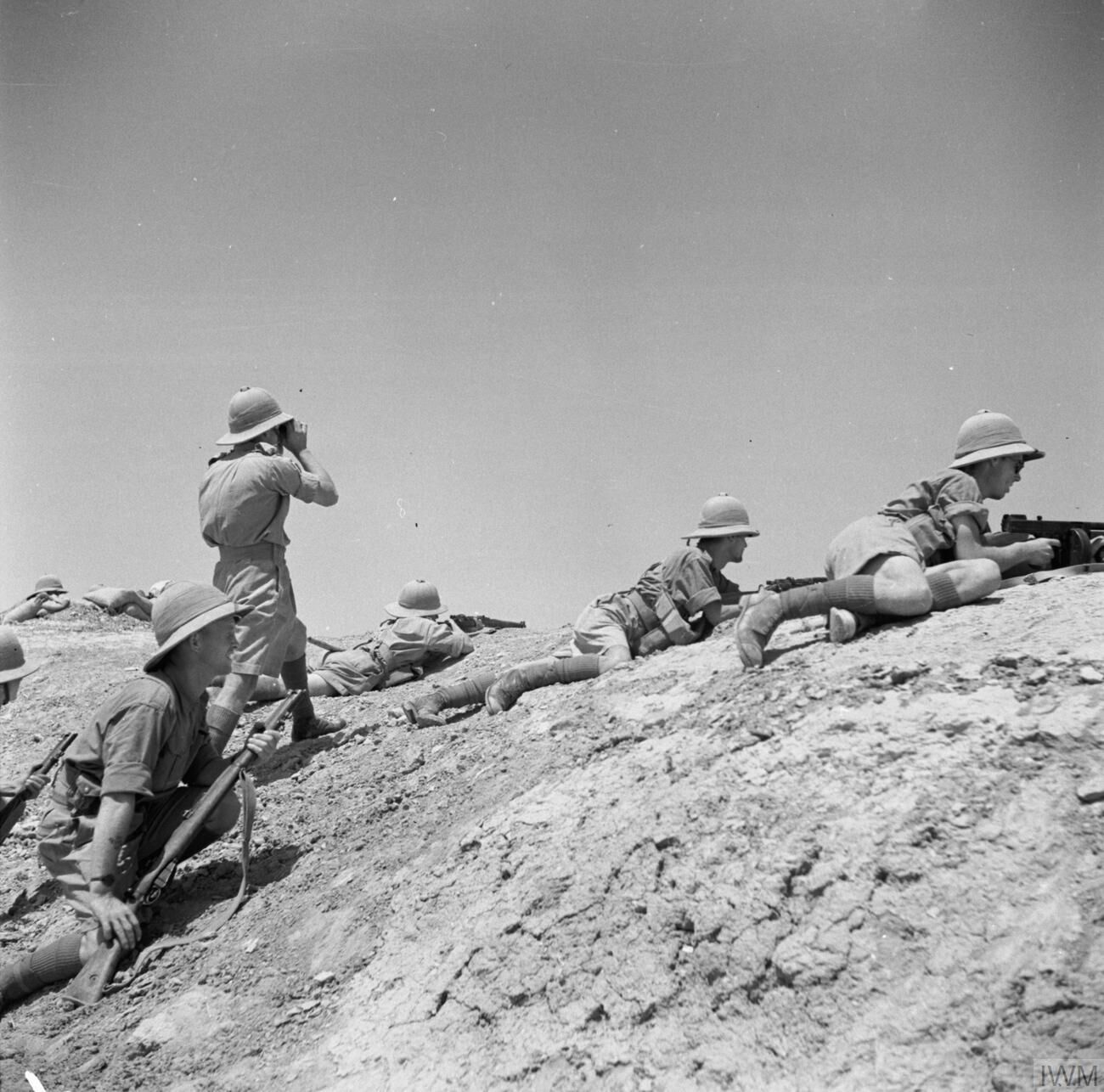
British troops taking cover in Iraq.

On 1 April, Rashid Ali, along with four senior Army and Air Force officers known as the "Golden Square", seized power via a coup d'état and Rashid Ali proclaimed himself Chief of the "National Defence Government." The Golden Square deposed al-Hashimi and restored Rashid Ali. Ali did not overthrow the monarchy and named a new Regent to King Faisal II, Sherif Sharaf. The leaders of the "National Defence Government" proceeded to arrest many pro-British citizens and politicians but many escaped through Amman in Transjordan. The new regime planned to refuse further concessions to the United Kingdom, to retain diplomatic links with Fascist Italy and to expel the most prominent pro-British politicians. The plotters considered the United Kingdom to be weak and believed that its government would negotiate with their new government regardless of its legality. On 17 April, Rashid Ali, on behalf of the "National Defence Government" asked Germany for military assistance in the event of war with the British. Ali attempted to restrict British rights guaranteed under Article 5 of the 1930 Anglo-Iraqi Treaty, when he insisted that newly arrived British troops quickly be transported through Iraq and to Palestine.

Before the coup, Rashid Ali's supporters had been informed that Germany would recognise the independence of Iraq from the British Empire. There had also been discussions on war material being sent to support the Iraqis and other Arab factions in fighting the British. On 3 May, German Foreign Minister Joachim von Ribbentrop persuaded Adolf Hitler to secretly return Dr. Fritz Grobba to Iraq to lead a diplomatic mission to channel support to the Rashid Ali regime but the British quickly learned of the German arrangements through intercepted Italian diplomatic transmissions. On 6 May, in accordance with the Paris Protocols, Germany concluded a deal with the Vichy French government to release war materials, including aircraft, from sealed stockpiles in the French Mandate of Syria and transport them to Iraq. The French also agreed to allow passage of other weapons and material and loaned several airbases in northern Syria to Germany, for the transport of German aircraft to Iraq. Between 9 May and the end of the month, about 100 German and about 20 Italian aircraft landed on Syrian airfields.

On 30 April, the Iraqi Army surrounded and besieged RAF Habbaniya; the base had no operational aircraft but the RAF converted trainers to carry weapons and a battalion of infantry reinforcements was flown in. German and Italian aircraft supported the Iraqi army and British reinforcements were dispatched to Iraq from Transjordan and India. The larger but poorly trained Iraqi force was defeated and Baghdad and Mosul were captured. Ali and his supporters fled the country and an armistice was signed, restoring the monarchy of Faisal II, the Kingdom of Iraq and a pro-British government. The defeat of the rebellion saw the defeat of the German-Italian attempt to entrench an Axis state in Iraq and worsened relations between the UK and Vichy France, culminating in the Syria-Lebanon Campaign.

=== Operation Exporter in Lebanon and Syria ===
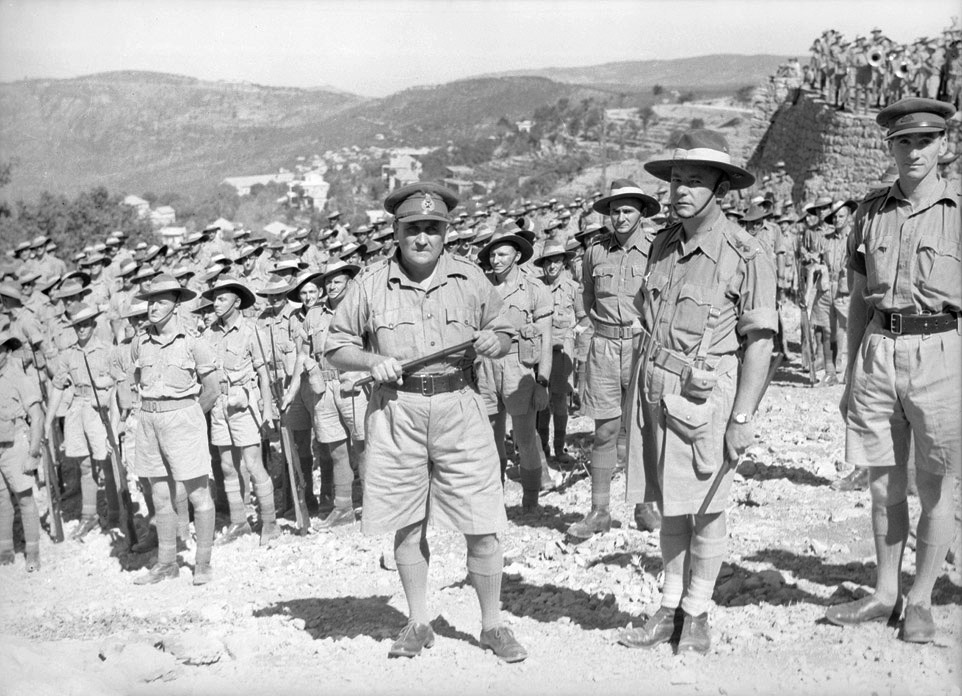
Australian troops in Lebanon, 1941

In Operation Exporter, Australian, Free French, British and Indian units invaded Syria and Lebanon from Palestine in the south on 8 June 1941. Vigorous resistance was met from the Vichy French but superior Allied infantry equipment and numbers overwhelmed the defenders. More attacks were launched at the end of June and early July from Iraq into northern and central Syria, by Iraqforce. By 8 July, north-east Syria had been captured and elements of Iraqforce had advanced up the river Euphrates towards Aleppo, the rear of the Vichy forces defending Beirut from the advance from the south. Negotiations for an armistice were started on 11 July and surrender terms signed on 14 July.

=== Iran ===
Supplies to the Soviet Union had been sent via the North Cape to Murmansk and Arkhangelsk soon after the German invasion but the number of ships available was limited and convoys were vulnerable to German air and submarine attack. Supplies were also sent from American pacific ports to Vladivostok in Soviet-flagged ships but Allied planners wished to open another supply route through Iran. Though officially neutral, the Shah was widely viewed as pro-German by the allies. Following the Shah's refusal to open Iran up as a supply route for war materiel to the USSR and expel German nationals; the allies invaded and occupied Iran in August 1941. The Shah, who urged his military not to resist the invasion, was deposed and his young son placed on the throne as titular head of an allied controlled puppet government. Iranian oil fields were secured and the line of supply to Russia established and maintained for the remainder of the war.

=== Mandatory Palestine ===
From July to September 1940, Italian bomber aircraft repeatedly attacked British-ruled Mandatory Palestine. The attacks primarily focused on Haifa, with its strategic port and oil facilities, although other areas were also hit, most notably Tel Aviv, which suffered the deadliest bombing in Mandatory Palestine of the war when an Italian raid hit a residential area of the city. After this attack, due to air defences in Palestine being deemed insufficient, Palestinian Jews from the Haganah paramilitary organization were recruited to man anti-aircraft artillery units. The attacks tapered off at the end of September. Except for a minor German air raid in January 1941, the attacks did not resume until June 1941, this time involving a combination of German, Italian, and Vichy French aircraft. Haifa was again the primary target although Tel Aviv as well as other areas were also hit. The last such raid took place in September 1942.

Operation Atlas was carried out by a special commando unit of the Waffen SS and took place in October 1944. It involved five soldiers: three who were previously members of the Templer religious sect in Mandatory Palestine, and two Palestinian Arabs who were close collaborators of the mufti of Jerusalem, Amin al-Husseini. Atlas aimed at establishing an intelligence-gathering base in Mandatory Palestine, radioing information back to Germany, and recruiting and arming anti-British Palestinians by buying their support with gold. The plan failed utterly, and no meaningful action could be undertaken by the commandos. Three of the participants were arrested by the Transjordan Frontier Force a few days after their landing. The German commander was captured in 1946 and the fifth, Hasan Salama, succeeded in escaping.

=== Operation Mammoth ===
In 1943 a small team of German agents parachuted into Iraqi Kurdistan with the goal of covertly sabotaging Kirkuk oil fields and create a Kurdish uprising against the British with assistance from local Kurds who were seeking to create an independent Kurdistan. Further reinforcements of Nazis with weapons was supposed to be sent but the mission failed within days as the Nazi commandos landed 300 km away from their target destination and lost their weapons. They were soon arrested by the British and faced execution as spies, however they were released several years after World War II ended. Gottfried Müller, one of the Nazi parachuters, would later write and publish a book describing his experiences in Kurdistan named “Im brennenden Orient” ('The Burning Orient'), which was published in Germany in 1959.

== Gibraltar and Malta ==
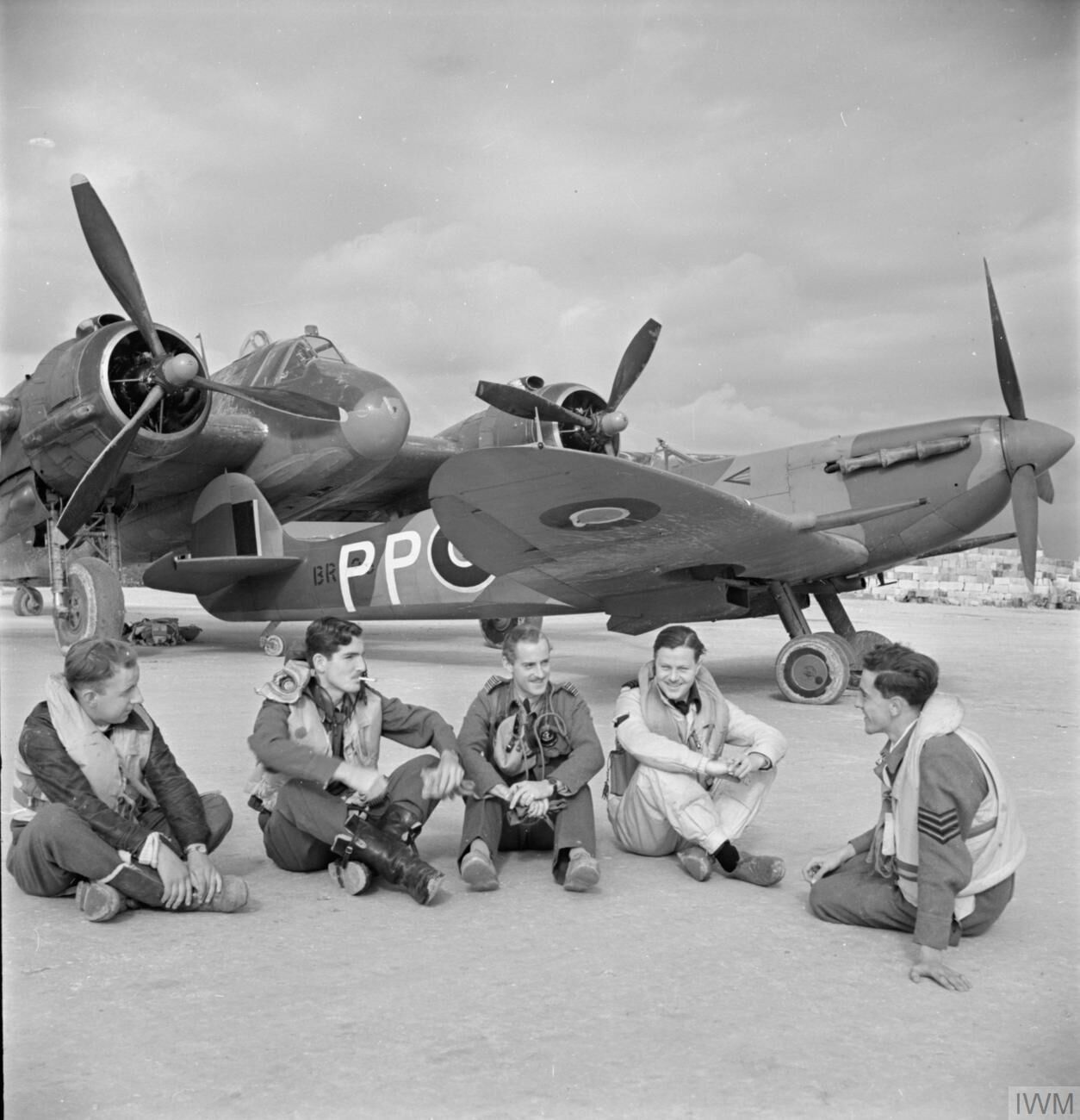
Five Malta-based RAF pilots sitting in front of a Beaufighter and a Spitfire at RAF Luqa, January 1943

Gibraltar commanded the entrance to the Mediterranean and had been a British fortress since the early 18th century. The territory provided a strongly defended harbour, from which ships could operate in the Atlantic and the Mediterranean. Force H (Vice-Admiral James Somerville) was based in Gibraltar and had the task of maintaining naval superiority and providing a strong escort for convoys to and from the Malta. Malta was 60 miles (97 km) from Sicily and one of the first targets of the Italian army and the Regia Aeronautica; the air defence of Malta comprised six obsolescent Gloster Gladiator biplanes. After the first Italian air attacks it became clear that Malta could be defended and in early July, the Gladiators were reinforced by twelve Hawker Hurricane fighters.

The Kriegsmarine began operations in the Mediterranean with establishment of the 23rd U-boat Flotilla at a base on Salamis Island in Greece in September 1941. The flotilla was to operate against British supply convoys to Allied forces on Malta and in Tobruk. On 7 December, control of the 23rd Flotilla was transferred from Kernével to Field Marshal Albert Kesselring, Commander in Chief South (OB Süd) in Italy. Additional bases were established in Pola and La Spezia in northern Italy, as more U-boats were sent to the Mediterranean.

Bombing and the naval blockade led to food and commodity shortages and rationing was imposed on the inhabitants. The Luftwaffe and the Regia Aeronautica reinforcements in the Mediterranean joined in the bombing but during a lull in early 1942, 61 Supermarine Spitfires were delivered, which very much improved the defensive situation, although food, ammunition, and fuel were still short. Supply runs during lulls in the bombing kept Malta in being but many ships like SS Ohio were damaged too severely to leave. The defence of the island ensured that the Allies had an advantage in the fight to control the Mediterranean and as the garrison recovered from periods of intense bombing, aircraft, submarines and light surface ships resumed attacks on Axis supply ships, leading to fuel and supply shortages for the Axis forces in Libya.

== Allied reply ==
=== Western Desert ===
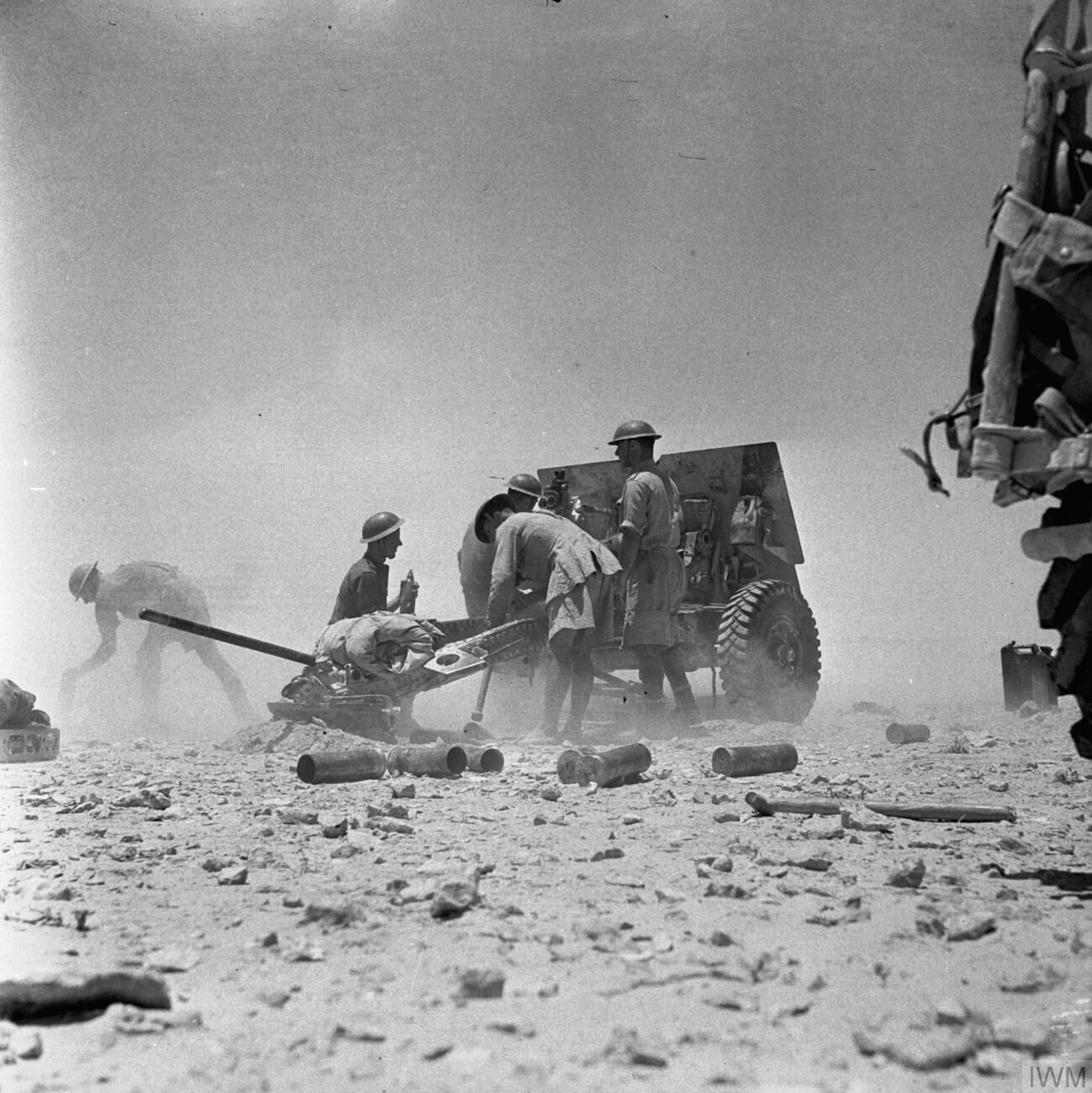
British troops operating a Royal Artillery field gun.

During 1941, the British launched several offensives to push back the Axis forces in North Africa. Operation Brevity failed as did Operation Battleaxe but Operation Crusader, the third and larger offensive was launched at the end of the year. Over December 1941 into early 1942, Allied forces pushed the Italian-German forces back through Libya to roughly the limit of the previous Operation Compass advance. Taking advantage of the Allied position, German and Italian forces counter-attacked and pushed back the Allies to Gazala, west of Tobruk. As both sides prepared offensives, the Axis forces struck first and inflicted a big defeat upon the Allied forces during the Battle of Gazala. The routed Allied forces retreated to Egypt where they made a stand at El Alamein.

Following the First Battle of El Alamein, which had stalled the Axis advance into Egypt, British forces went onto the offensive in October. The Second Battle of El Alamein marked a watershed in the Western Desert Campaign and turned the tide in the North African Campaign. It ended the Axis threat to Egypt, the Suez Canal and of gaining access to the Middle Eastern and Persian oil fields via North Africa. As the Eighth Army pushed west across the desert, capturing Libya, German and Italian forces occupied southern France and landed in Tunisia. On 8 November, Allied forces launched Operation Torch landing in various places across French North Africa. In December 1942, after a 101-day British blockade, French Somaliland fell to the Allies.

=== Tunisia ===
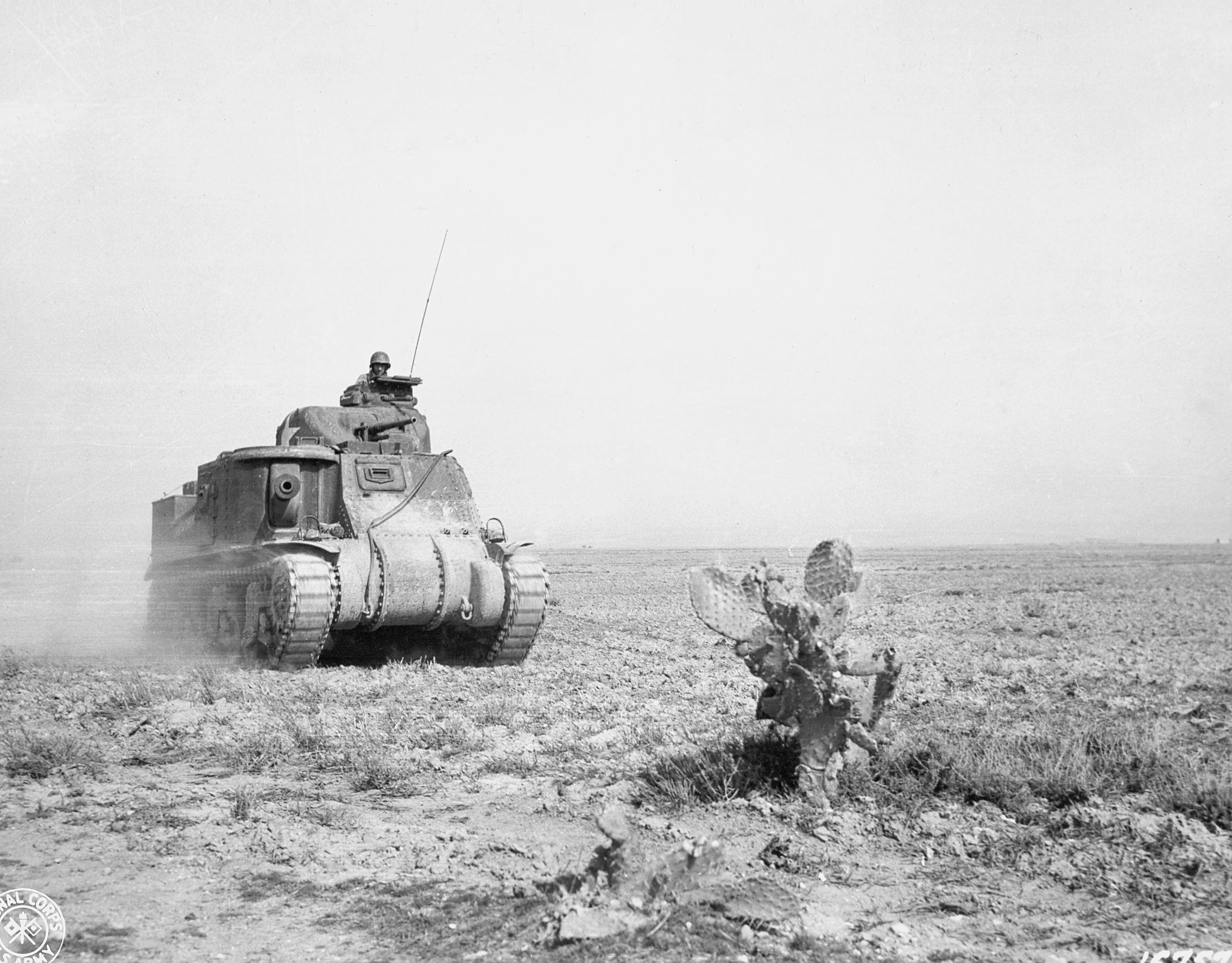
An M3 Lee tank of U.S. 1st Armored Division advancing to support American forces during the Battle at Kasserine Pass

Following the Japanese attack on Pearl Harbor on 7 December 1941, the United States joined the war. On 8 November 1942, American forces entered combat in North Africa with Operation Torch, which "transformed the Mediterranean from a British to an Allied theater of war", "succeeding operations in the Mediterranean area proved far more extensive than intended. One undertaking was to lead to the next".

After liberating French North Africa and clearing the enemy from the Italian colonies, the Allies sought to bring the entire French empire effectively into the war against the Axis powers. They reopened the Mediterranean route to the Middle East. They went on from Africa to liberate Sicily, Sardinia, and Corsica. They caused Mussolini to topple from power, and they brought his successors to surrender. They drew more and more German military resources into a stubborn defence of the Italian peninsula, and helped the Yugoslavs to pin down within their spirited country thousands of Axis troops. Eventually, the Allies delivered a solid blow from southern France against the German forces which were opposing the Allied drive from the beaches of Normandy! They made Marseilles available for Allied use and they occupied northern Italy and Greece." Howe further notes that "Hitler had always accepted the principle that the Mediterranean was an area of paramount Italian interest just as, farther north, German interests were exclusive.

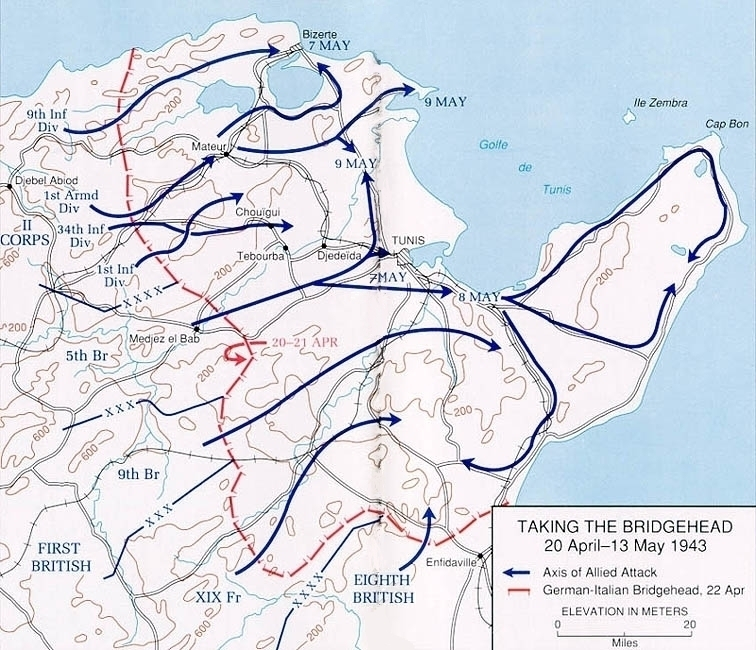
Allied advances during the last weeks of the Tunisian campaign.

Allied forces were placed under the command of a Supreme Allied Commander AFHQ Mediterranean, General Dwight D. Eisenhower. Axis forces were caught between the Allied armies during the Tunisia Campaign but managed to delay the Allied advance by defensive operations, most notably with the Battle of the Kasserine Pass and a temporary defensive success at the Battle of the Mareth Line. After shattering the Axis defence on the Mareth Line, the Allies squeezed Axis forces into a pocket around Tunis. Axis resistance in Africa ended on 13 May 1943, with the unconditional surrender of nearly 240,000 men, who became prisoners of war.

== Southern Europe ==
=== Italian campaign and Italian Civil War ===
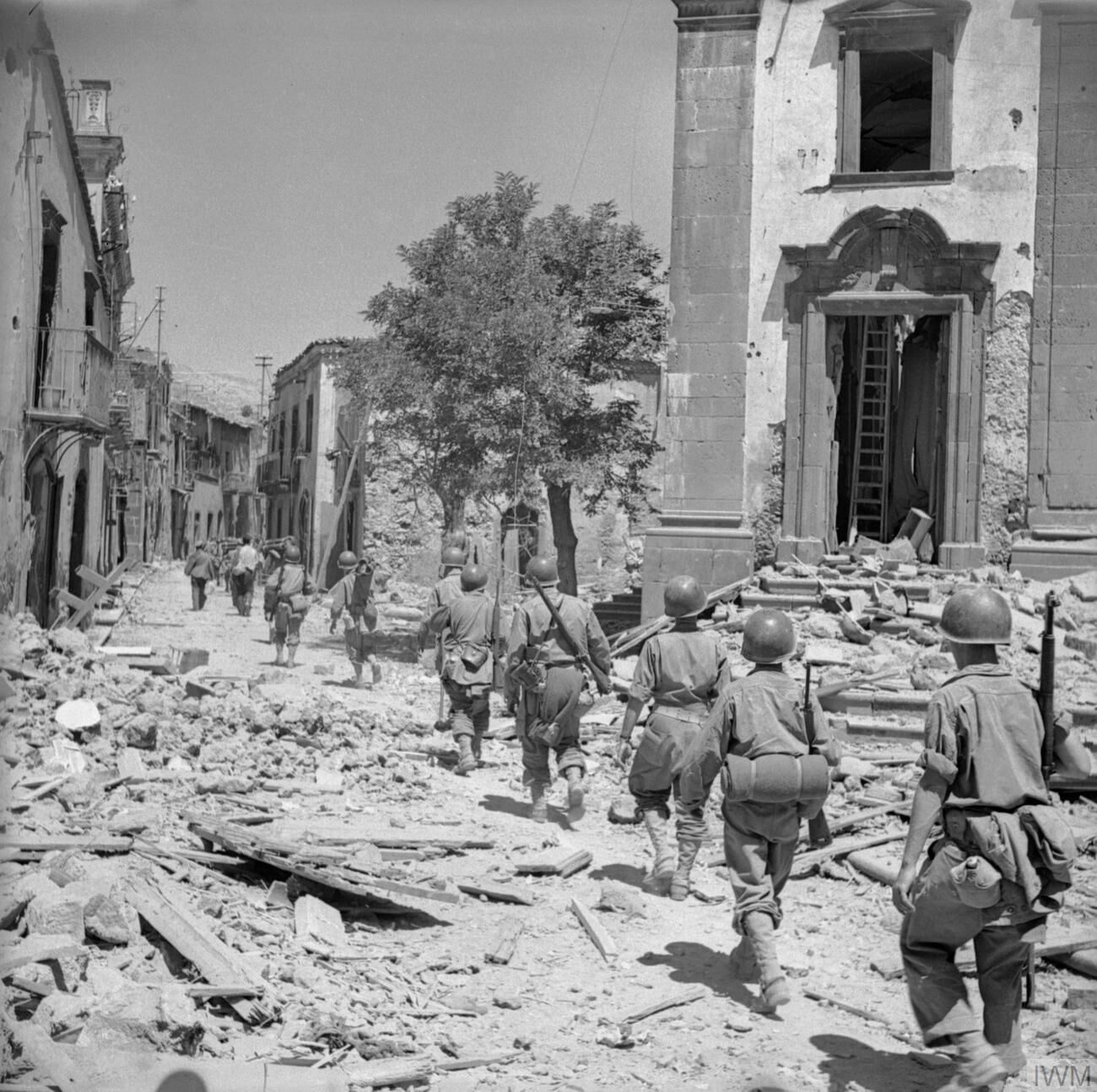
US troops moving through a destroyed town in Sicily, 1943

Following their victory in North Africa, the Allies turned their attention to knocking out Italy from the war and forcing Germany to disperse its forces, the Allies invaded Sicily in Operation Husky on 10 July 1943, with amphibious and airborne landings. The German and Italian forces were unable to prevent the Allied capture of the island but evacuated most of their troops and equipment to the mainland before the Allies entered Messina on 17 August. On 25 July, the Italian government deposed Mussolini, the Italian leader, who was subsequently arrested. The new government announced that it would continue the war but secretly commenced negotiations with the Allies.

The Allied invasion of Italy started when the British Eighth Army landed in the toe of Italy on 3 September 1943, in Operation Baytown. The Italian government signed the surrender the same day, believing they would be given time to make preparations against the anticipated German intervention. The Allies announced the Armistice of Cassibile on 8 September and German forces implemented plans to occupy the Italian peninsula. On 9 September, American and British forces of the US Fifth Army landed at Salerno in Operation Avalanche and more British airborne troops landed at Taranto in Operation Slapstick. German forces which had escaped from Sicily were concentrated against Avalanche, while additional forces were brought in to occupy Rome and disarm the Italian Army in central and northern Italy.

The Germans were unable to prevent the Italian fleet sailing to Malta, although the battleship Roma was sunk by the Luftwaffe on 9 September. In the occupied areas of southern Europe and the Mediterranean, German forces rapidly disarmed and captured Italian troops, putting down any resistance they offered in Yugoslavia, southern France and Greece. Meanwhile, on 16 September, a German airborne force led by Otto Skorzeny rescued Mussolini from the mountain resort in the Gran Sasso where he was being held. A puppet government, the Italian Social Republic was established with Mussolini as head of state was set up in northern Italy as the successor state to the former fascist government.

The Italian Co-Belligerent Army was created to fight against the puppet government headed by Mussolini and its German allies, alongside the large Italian resistance movement, while other Italian troops continued to fight alongside the Germans in the National Republican Army; this period is known as the Italian Civil War. Although other European countries such as Norway, the Netherlands, and France also had partisan movements and collaborationist governments with Nazi Germany, armed confrontation between compatriots was most intense in Italy, making the Italian case unique. In 1965, the definition of "civil war" was used for the first time by fascist politician and historian Giorgio Pisanò in his books, while Claudio Pavone's book Una guerra civile. Saggio storico sulla moralità della Resistenza (A Civil War. Historical Essay On the Morality Of the Resistance), published in 1991, led to the term "Italian Civil War" being used more frequently by Italian and international historiography.

As the campaign in Italy continued, the rough terrain prevented fast movement and proved ideal for defence, the Allies continued to push the Axis forces northwards through the rest of the year. The Germans prepared a defensive line called the Winter Line (parts of which were called the Gustav Line) proved a major obstacle to the Allies at the end of 1943, halting the advance. Operation Shingle, an amphibious assault at Anzio behind the line was intended to break it, but did not have the desired effect and was heavily opposed by German and RSI forces. The line was eventually broken by frontal assault at the Fourth Battle of Monte Cassino in the spring of 1944 and Rome was captured in June.

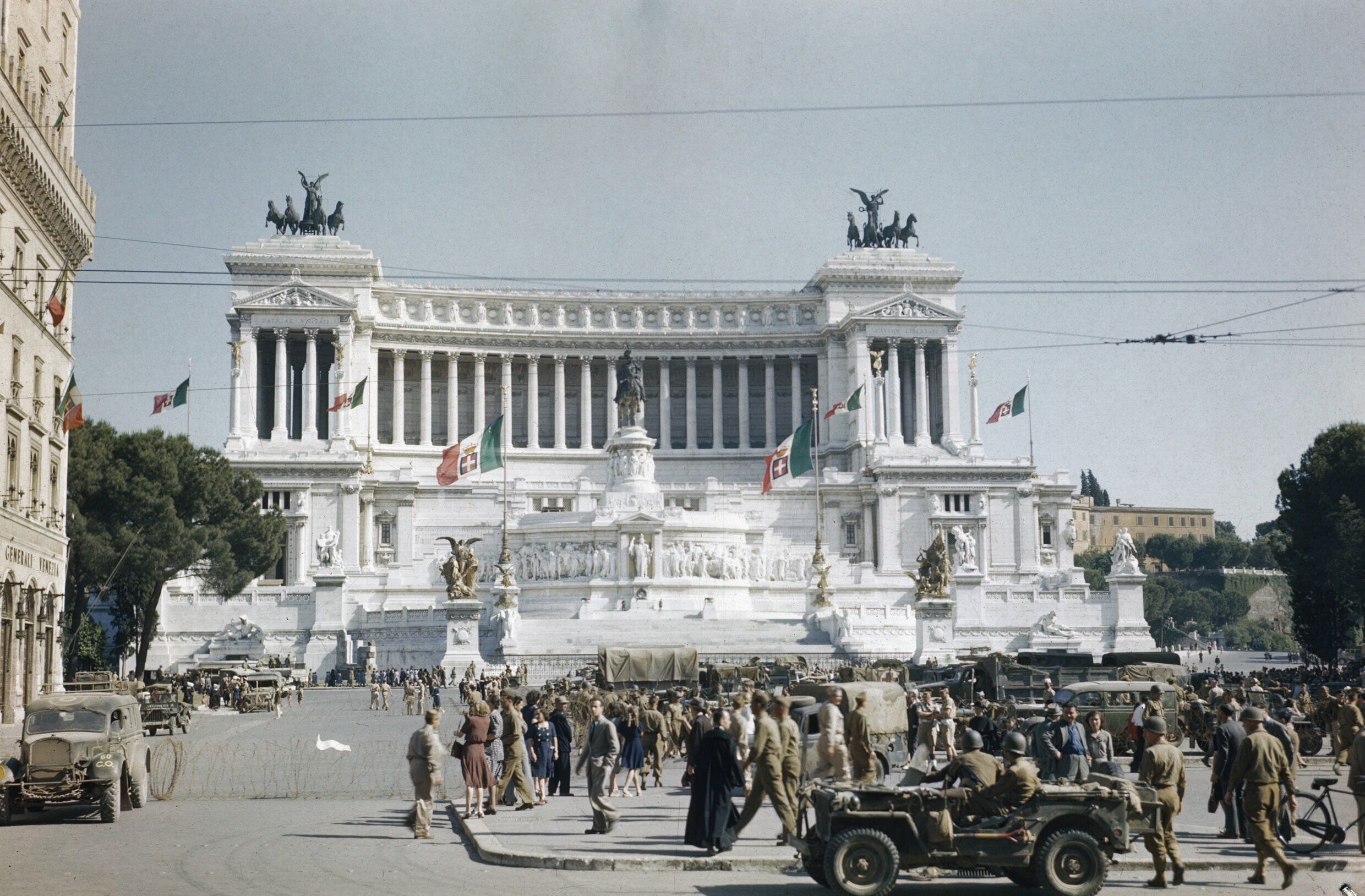
Allied forces in Rome, June 1944

Following the liberation of Rome, the Normandy landings (6 June 1944) that began Operation Overlord and the Red Army victories on the Eastern Front, the Italian campaign became of secondary importance to both sides. The Gothic Line north of Rome was not broken until the Spring offensive of 1945. From 1944 to the end of war, the Italian Front was made up of a multi-national Allied force of Americans (including segregated African and Japanese-Americans), British, Canadians, French, Brazilians, Greeks, Italian co-belligerent forces, Italian partisans, Poles, the 2nd New Zealand Division, and the South Africans and Rhodesians as well as members of the British Commonwealth and French colonial forces, including the 3rd Algerian Infantry Division, Moroccans, Gurkha Indians, and forces raised in Mandatory Palestine. (Note: The French and Canadian troops withdrawn their forces in Italy to fight in the Western front. The withdrawal began with the French including their colonial forces in August 1944, and the Canadians in February 1945.)

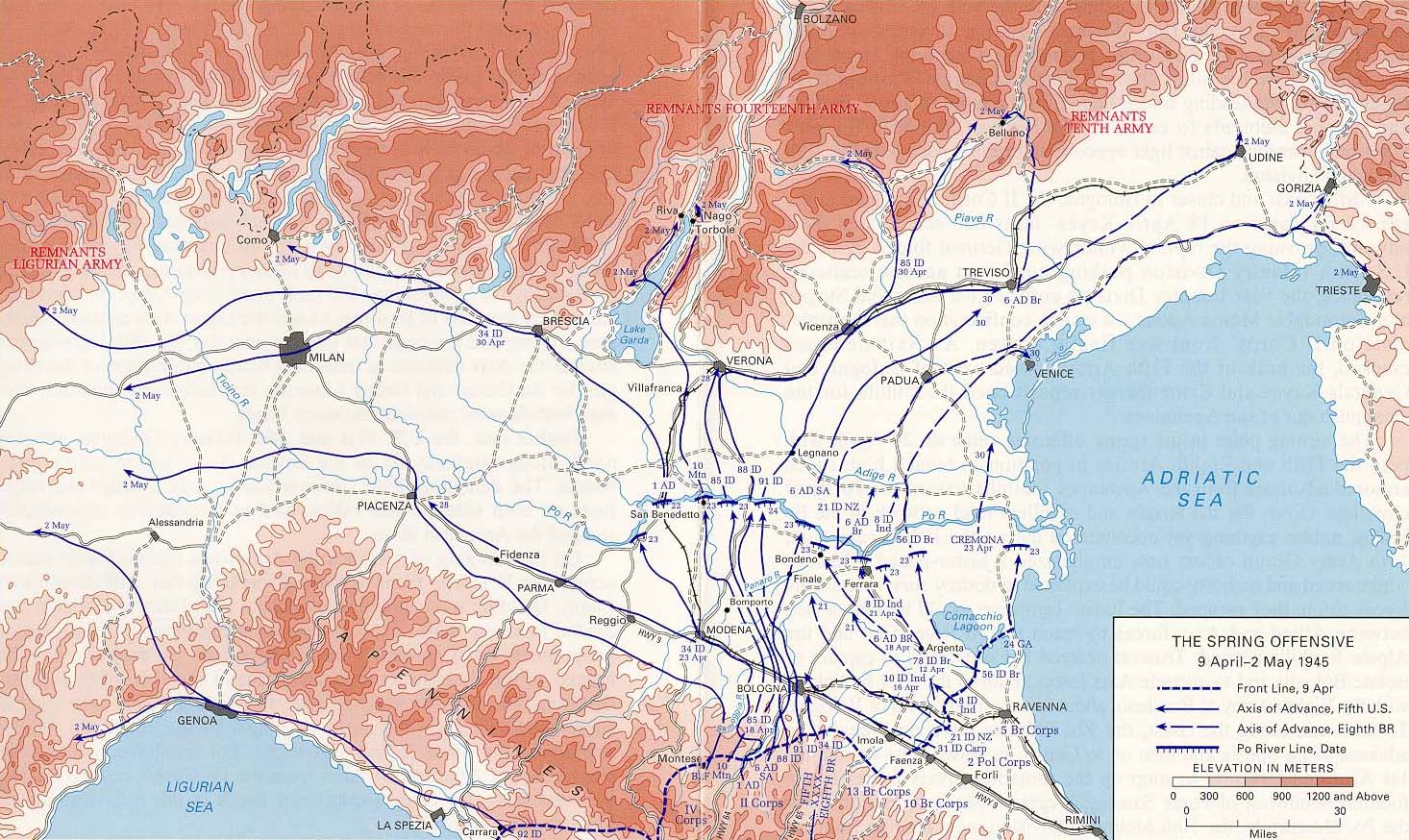
Map of the advances of the Allied divisions in the Spring 1945 offensive in Italy.

On April 25, the National Liberation Committee in northern Italy had launched a general insurrection, at the same time, the remaining German and RSI forces are defeated by the Allied forces in the spring offensive. On April 28, two days before the death of Adolf Hitler. Mussolini attempted to escape to Switzerland, but was captured and later executed by Italian partisans along with the high-ranking Fascist officials of the Italian Social Republic. On May 1, after signing the Surrender at Caserta. Marshal Rodolfo Graziani, the Minister of Defence of the Italian Social Republic, surrendered to the Allies along with the National Republican Army.

On 2 May, SS General Karl Wolff and the Commander-in-Chief of the German 10th Army, General Heinrich von Vietinghoff, after Operation Sunrise (secret negotiations with the Allies), ordered German forces in Italy to make an unconditional surrender to the Allies.

=== Dodecanese campaign ===
The brief campaign in the Italian-held Dodecanese Islands resulted as both Germany and the Allies scrambled to occupy them after the surrender of Italy in early September 1943. The main island of Rhodes was swiftly secured by German forces, but British garrisons were established on most islands by mid-September. German air superiority, tactical prowess, and the absence of Allied reinforcements doomed the Allied effort, however. German forces, including paratroopers and Brandenburger commandos, launched a counter-offensive, capturing the island of Kos within two days in early October. A massive 50-day-long aerial campaign was launched against the island of Leros defended by Italian troops commanded by Admiral Mascherpa, who resisted the German air offensive before the landing of British support troops, which was invaded by the Germans who landed by sea and air on 12 November and surrendered four days later. The remaining British garrisons were then evacuated to the Middle East.

=== Invasion of southern France ===
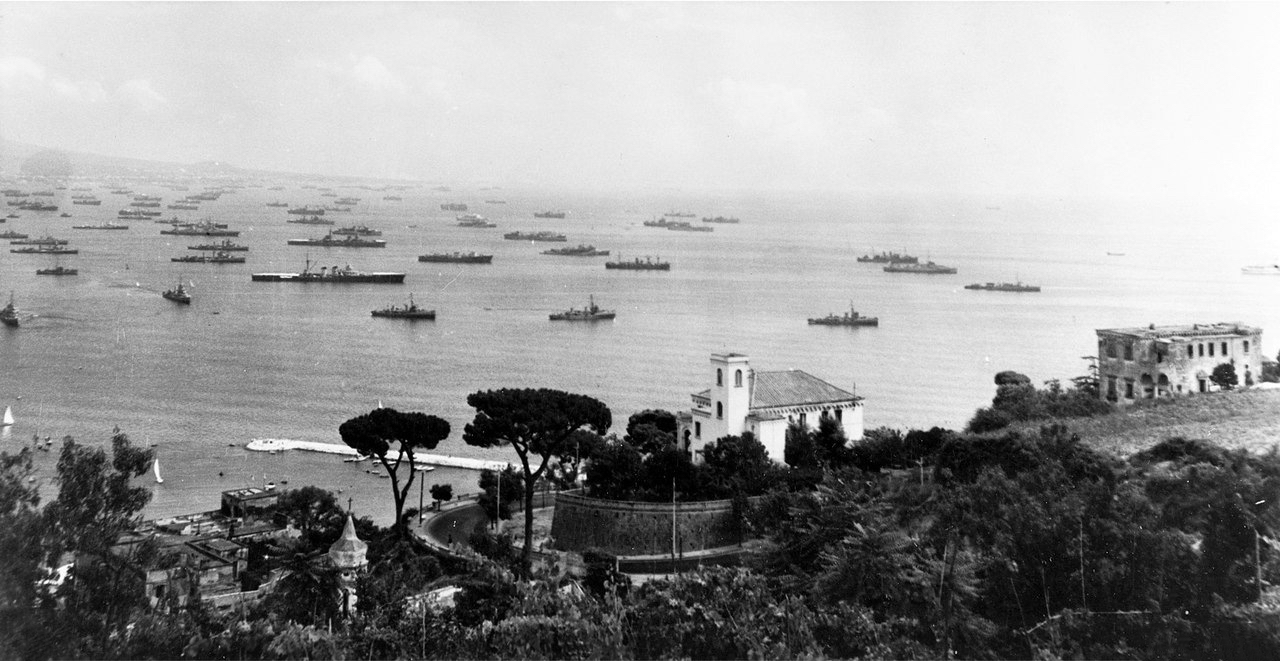
Allied fleets landing in southern France.

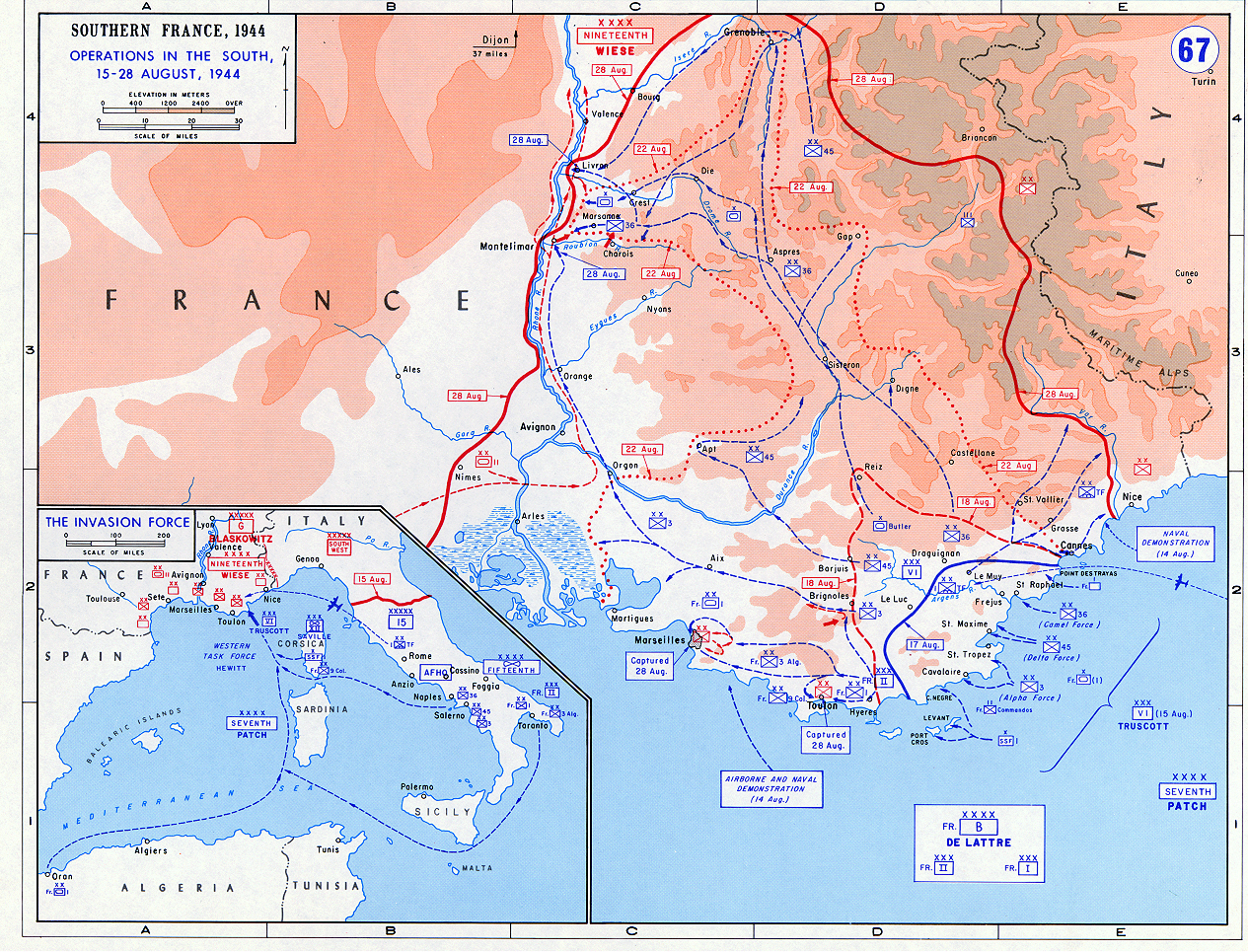
Map of Allied landing in Operation Dragoon.

On 15 August 1944, in an effort to aid their operations in Normandy, the Allies launched Operation Dragoon – the invasion of Southern France between Toulon and Cannes. The Allies rapidly broke out of their beachheads and fanned out north and east to join up with the American 12th Army Group which was breaking out of the Normandy beachhead. In early September supreme command of the 6th Army Group moved from AFHQ to SHAEF and the 6th Army Group moved out of the Mediterranean Theatre and into the European Theatre fighting as one of three Allied army groups on the Western Front.

== Post-war conflicts ==
=== Trieste ===
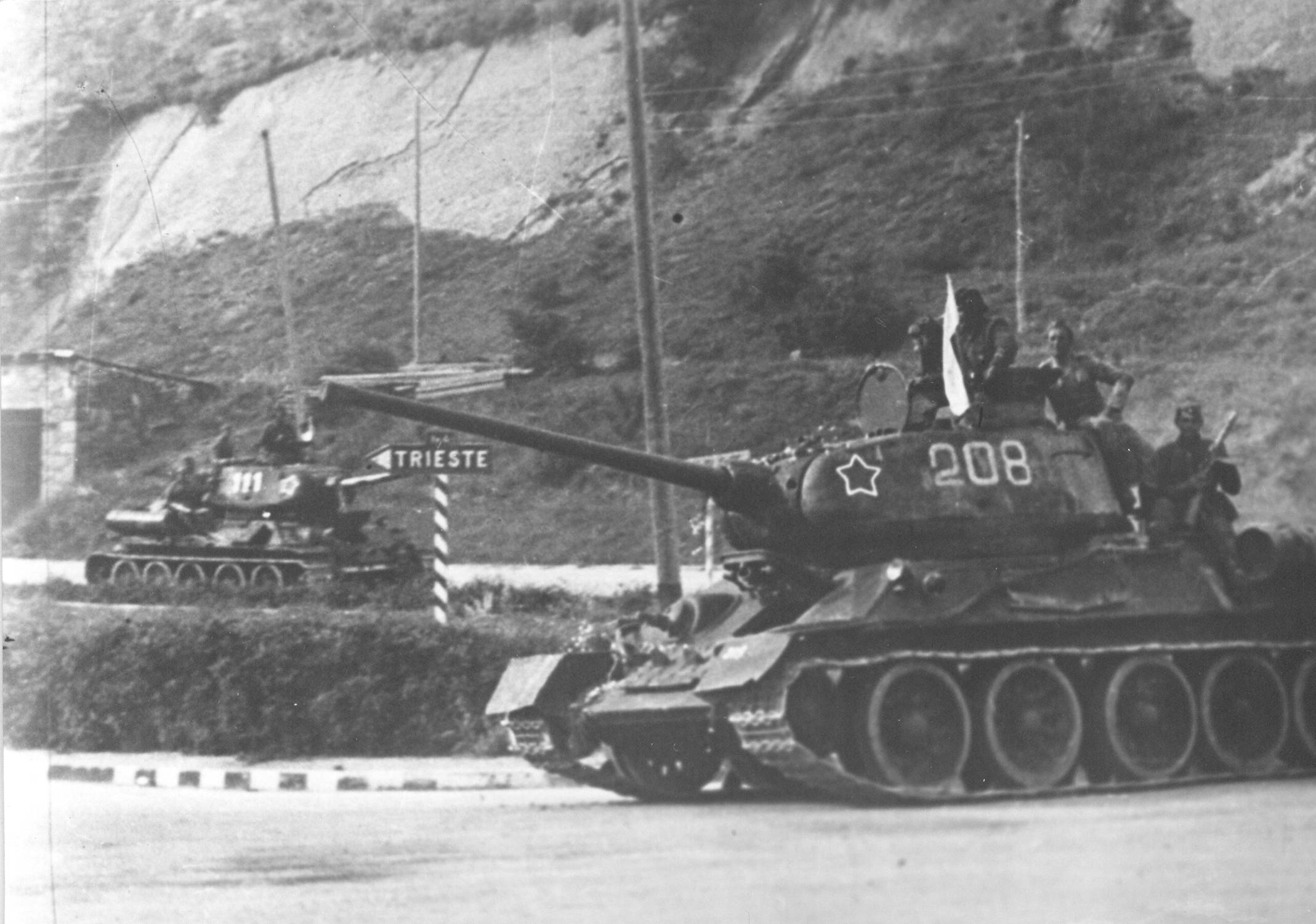
Tanks of the Yugoslav People's Army in Trieste.

At the end of the war in Europe, on 1 May 1945, troops of the 4th Army of the Yugoslavia and the Slovene 9th Corpus NLA occupied the town of Trieste. The Germans surrendered to the Allies which entered the town the following day. The Yugoslavs had to leave the town some days after.

=== Greece ===
Allied forces which had been sent to Greece in October 1944 after the German withdrawal, were attacked by the leftist EAM-ELAS Resistance movement, resulting in clashes in Athens during December of that year, which began the Greek Civil War.

=== Syria ===
In Syria, nationalist protests were on the rise at the continued occupation of the Levant by France in May 1945. French forces then tried to quell the protests but concern with heavy Syrian casualties forced Winston Churchill to oppose French action there. After being rebuffed by Charles De Gaulle he ordered British forces under general Bernard Paget into Syria from Jordan with orders to fire on the French if necessary. A crisis began as British armoured cars and troops then reached the Syrian capital Damascus following which the French were escorted and confined to their barracks. With political pressure added the French ordered a ceasefire; following which the French withdrew from Syria the following year.

=== Palestine ===
Prior to the war, the British Mandate of Palestine was faced with inter-ethnic violence between Arabs and Jews. Following the end of World War II and the UN Partition Plan, a civil war between Palestinian Arabs and Jews broke out and lasted until the British withdrawal of the territory in May 1948, which later drew in neighbouring nations into the conflict, causing the start of the 1948 Arab–Israeli War.

== See also ==
- List of World War II battles
- Mediterranean U-boat Campaign (World War II)
- Military history of Gibraltar during World War II
- Military history of Italy during World War II
- Timeline of the North African campaign
- European Theatre of World War II
- Pacific War
