= Trebeništa, Debarca =

Trebeništa
- Требеништа
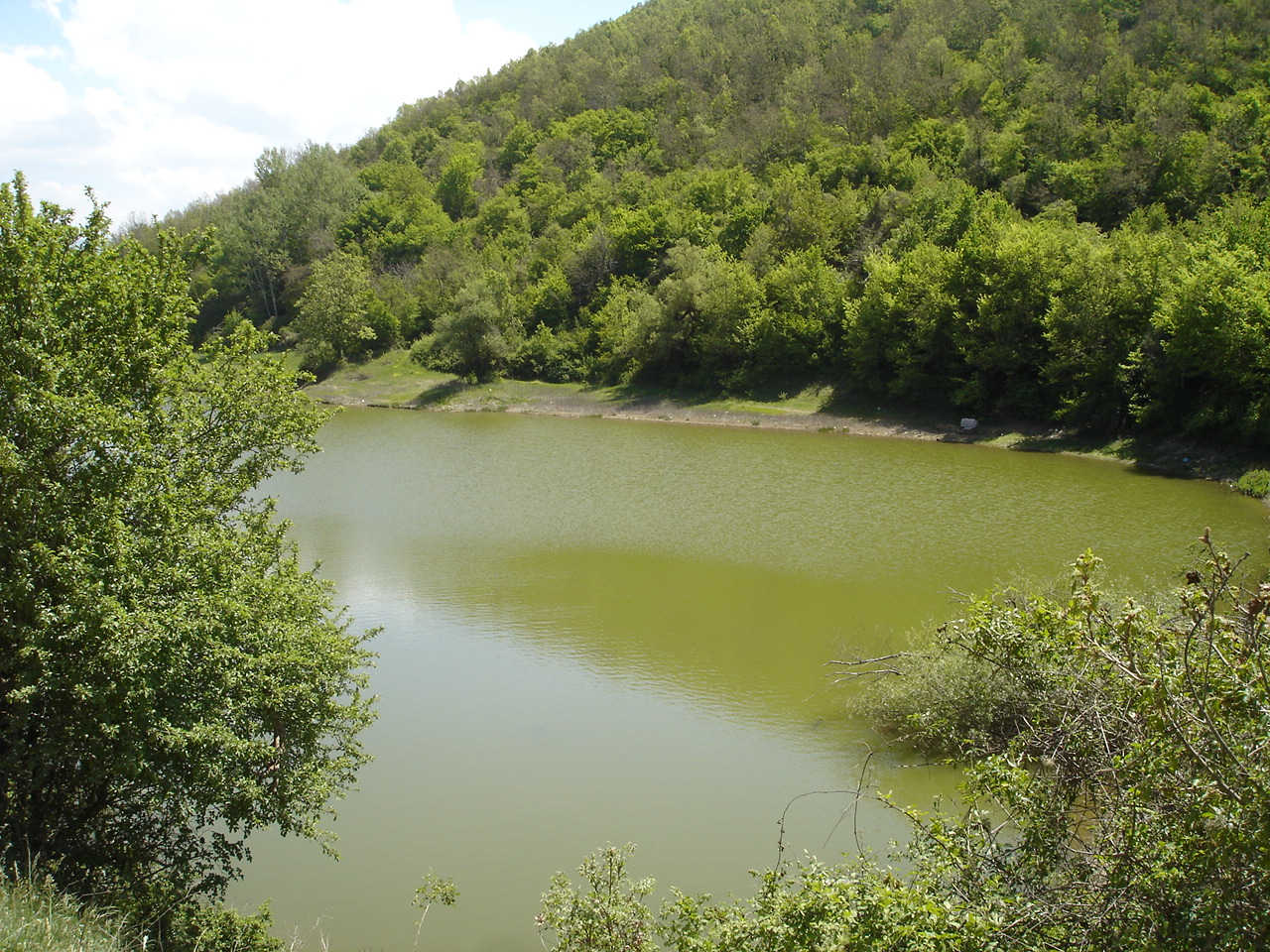
- Bobano Lake, near Trebeništa

- Location within North Macedonia
- Country: North Macedonia
- Region: Southwestern
- Municipality: Debarca

Population (2002)
  - Total: 513
- Time zone: UTC+1 (CET)
  - Summer (DST): UTC+2 (CEST)
- Car plates: OH
- Website: .

Trebeništa (Macedonian: Требеништа) is a village in the municipality of Debarca, North Macedonia. It used to be part of the former municipality of Mešeišta.

== Demographics ==
According to the 2002 census, the village had a total of 513 inhabitants. Ethnic groups in the village include:

- Macedonians 500
- Albanians 8
- Turks 2
- Serbs 1
- Others 2
