= April 1941 Italian offensive in Epirus =

Part of the Greco-Italian War during WW2

- Part of the Greco-Italian War and Battle of Greece of World War II
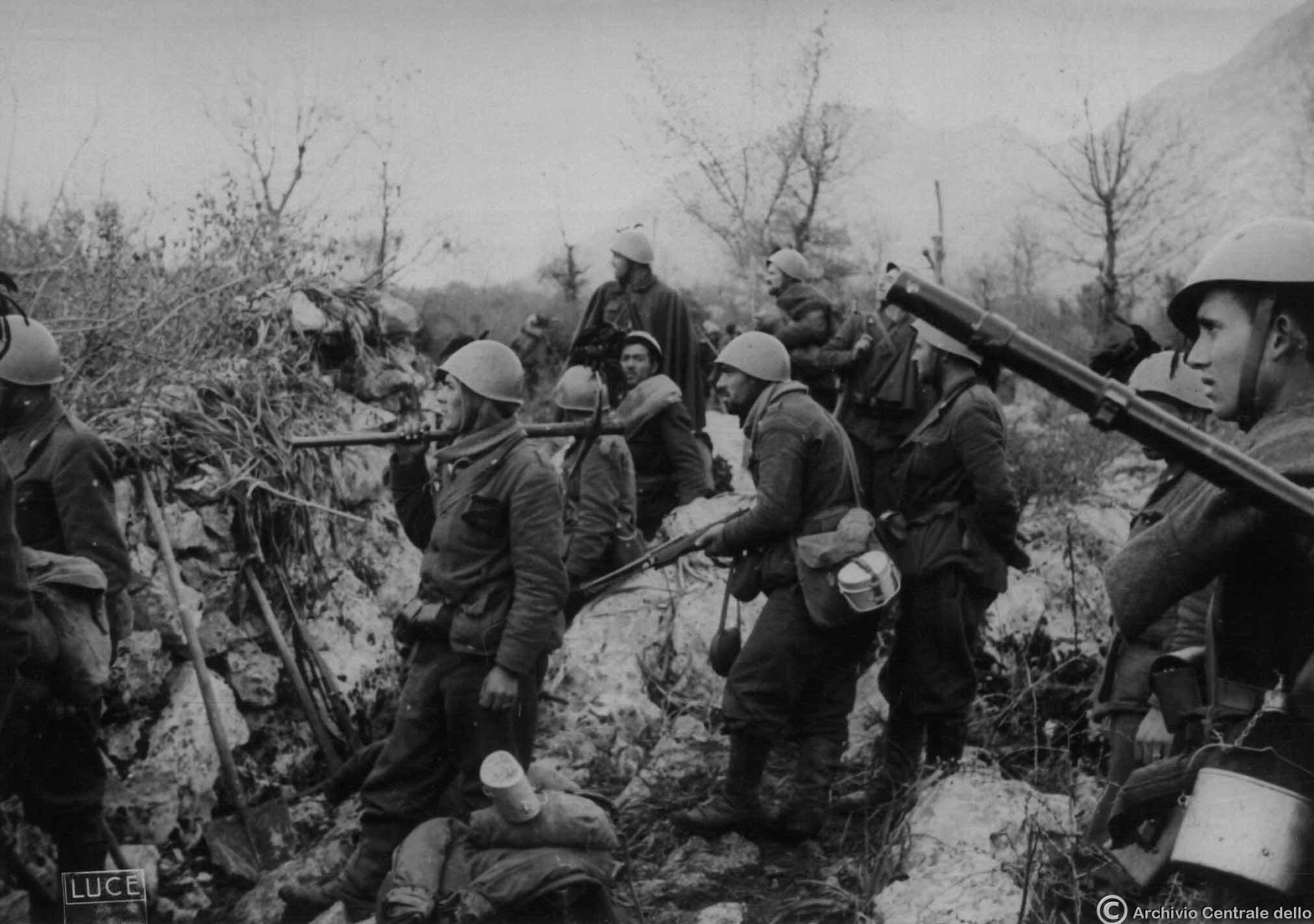
- Italian soldiers advancing in Albania, April 1941
Date	13–23 April 1941
Location	Southern Albania and Epirus
Territorial changes	Italian forces recover southern Albania and advance into the Greek region of Epirus

Belligerents
Kingdom of Italy	Kingdom of Greece

Commanders and leaders
Ugo Cavallero; Carlo Geloso; Alessandro Pirzio Biroli	Alexandros Papagos; Georgios Tsolakoglou (surrendered); Ioannis Pitsikas

Units involved
11th Army; 9th Army	Epirus Army Section; Western Macedonia Section

Casualties and losses
5,747	Unknown

From 13 to 23 April 1941, Italy fought an offensive against Greece in the final phase of the Greco-Italian War. The Greek army, which had pushed the Italians back into Albania, was forced to retreat due to the rapid success of the German invasion of Greece since 6 April. The retreating Greek forces were attacked by the Italians, who pressed south, recovered southern Albania and occupied territories in the Greek region of Epirus. The German and Italian pressure brought about the capitulation of the Greek army in Epirus on 22 April.

== Background ==
After the failed Italian spring offensive in March 1941. Mussolini ordered Cavallero, that the Italian forces in Albania must stay on defensive posture as the German invasion of Greece is getting prepared. On April 4, Hitler insisted Mussolini that the Italian defence in Albania would be the outmost importance of the Operation Marita. Since the first weeks of April. The Greek Commander-in-Chief Alexandros Papagos launched attacks towards Elbasan, Berat and Valona. Despite some success, the Greek forces in Albania lost the offensive capacity as the Italian defences was stiffened. As the German invasion of Greece was launched. Cavallero ordered Biroli, commander of the 9th Army to launch an offensive towards Western Macedonia, while Geloso's 11th Army would launch an attack aiming towards Argirocastro.

== Battle ==
On 13 April, the Italian forces began the second spring offensive. The Italian offensive was slowed due to the Greek rearguard troops left by the retreating Greeks in Albania. The town of Koritza was taken on 14th, Bilishti on 15th, but Erseke fell on 17th which the Greek troops offered resistance, Klisura fell on the same day. The advance was then aimed towards Leskovik to Ponte Perati, where Italian troops faced stiff opposition from Greek forces. The XXV Army Corps entered the Greek territory on 21 April.

== Aftermath ==
Greece originally surrendered to Germany, which Mussolini protested that Greece is also required to surrender to Italy. General Wilhelm List spoke to Mussolini that another surrender agreement will be drawn with the Italians.

The surrender agreement was formally signed on 23 April. General Tsolakoglou for Greece, General Alfred Jodl for Germany, and General Alberto Ferrero for Italy.

== Sources ==
- Cervi, Mario (2005). Storia della guerra di Grecia (in Italian). Rizzoli. ISBN 88-17-86640-7.
- Carrier, Richard (2021). Mussolini's Army against Greece: October 1940-April 1941. New York: Routledge. ISBN 978-1-138-58128-9.
