= Italian Army gorget patches =

Italian military insignia

Italian Army gorget patches (Italian: Mostreggiature or Italian: Mostrine) are worn by all army personnel on the collars of the shirts and jackets of their service uniforms and formal uniforms. The gorget patches identify the arm (Infantry, cavalry, artillery, engineer, signals, transport and material), corps (Health, commissariat, engineers), or speciality within an arm or corps a soldier belongs to. Generals wear golden stars instead of a gorget patches, while army recruits wear silver stars until they are assigned to a unit after basic training. Originally made from colored cloth, respectively embroidered cloth for Granatieri, Carabinieri and general staff members, gorget patches have been made since 1973 from enamelled metal.

All patches below are worn on the right side.

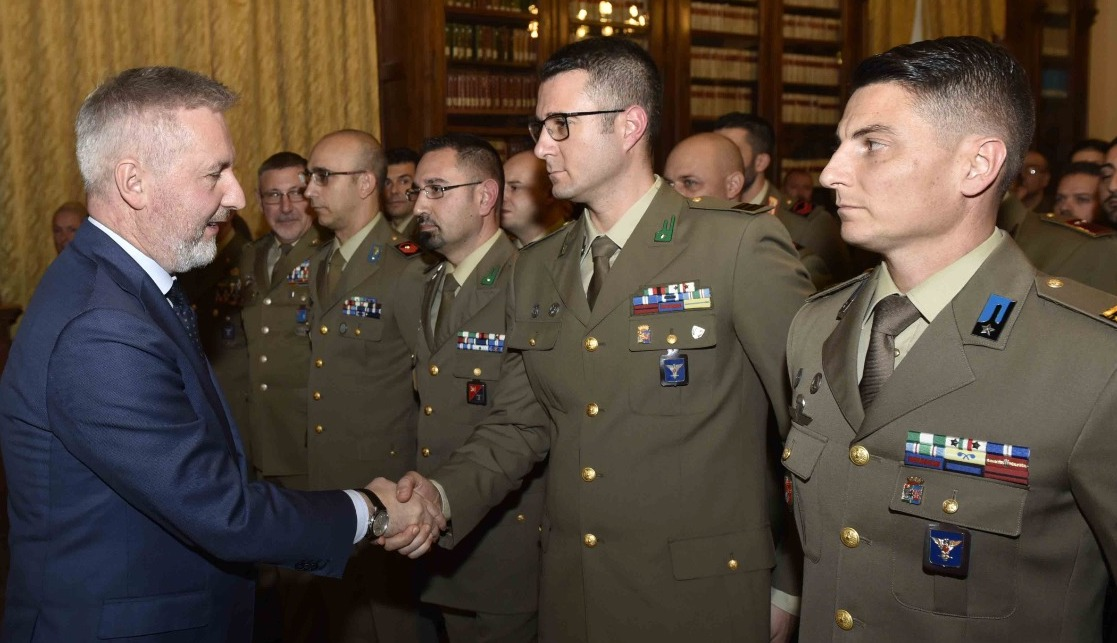
Italian Defense Minister Lorenzo Guerini greets NCOs, who wear paratroopers, Alpini, and TRAMAT gorget patches

== Multi-arm units ==
Multi-arm units (Italian: Unità Pluriarma) combine personnel from different arms and corps of the army and are therefore grouped separately from other gorget patches.

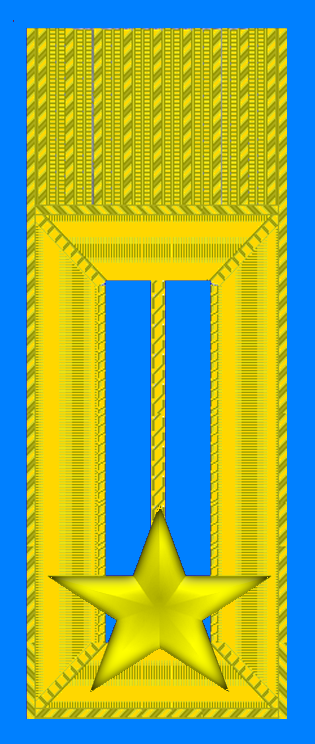
Army General Staff Officers

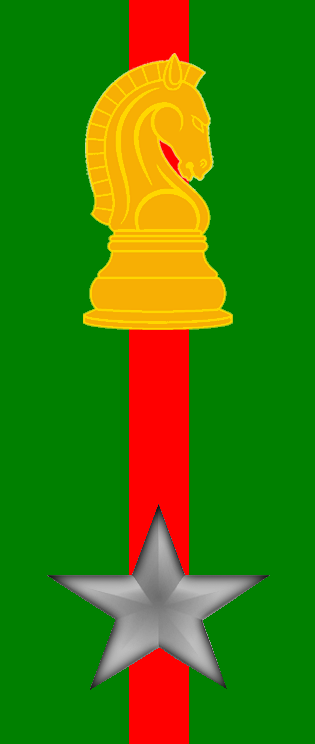
28th Regiment "Pavia" (PSYOPS)^{Note 1}

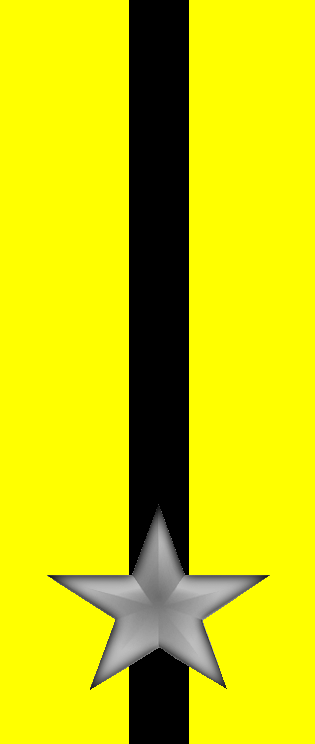
17th Volunteer Training Regiment "Acqui"^{Note 2}

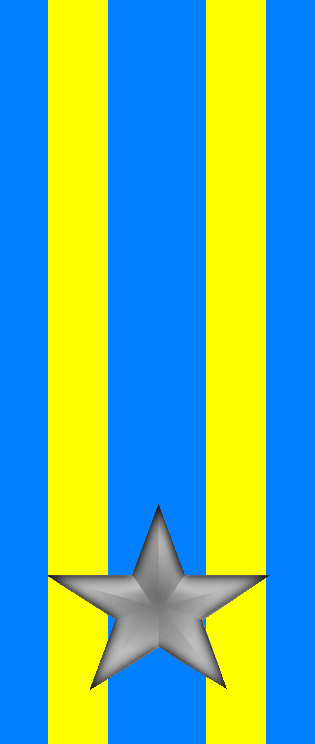
85th Volunteer Training Regiment "Verona"^{Note 2}

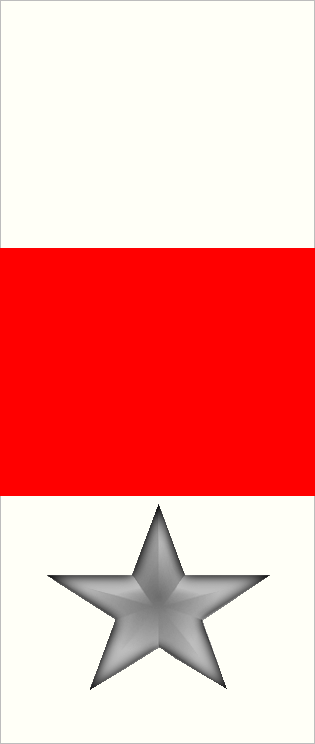
235th Volunteer Training Regiment "Piceno"^{Note 2}

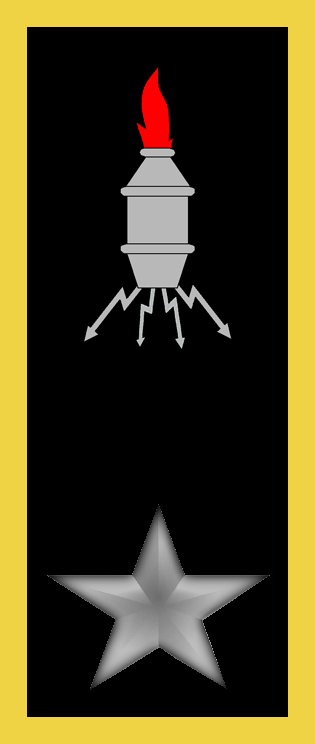
NBC-defense^{Note 3}

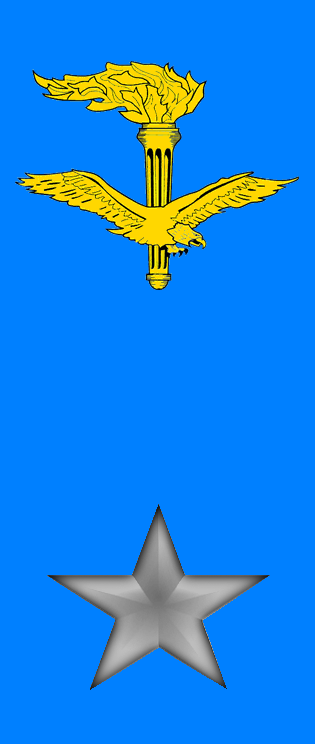
Army Aviation^{Note 4}

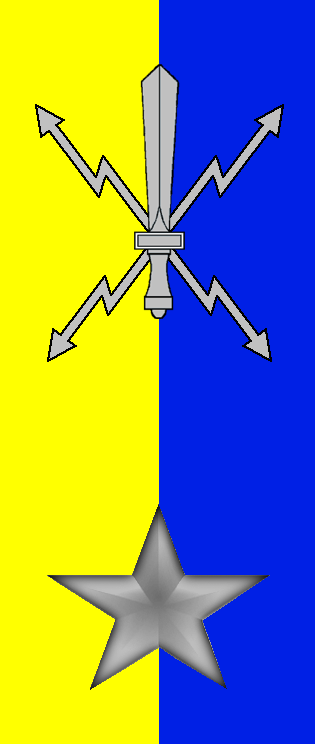
ISTAR & Electronic Warfare^{Note 5}

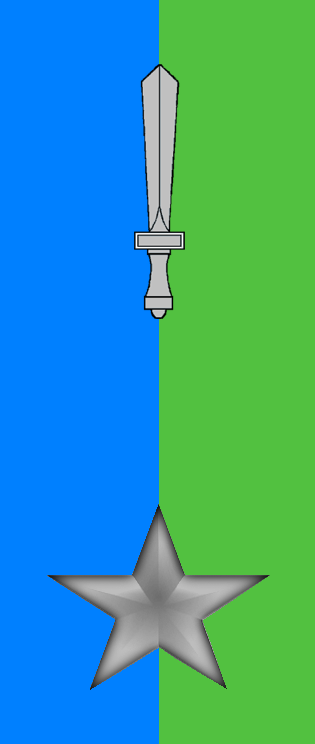
CIMIC

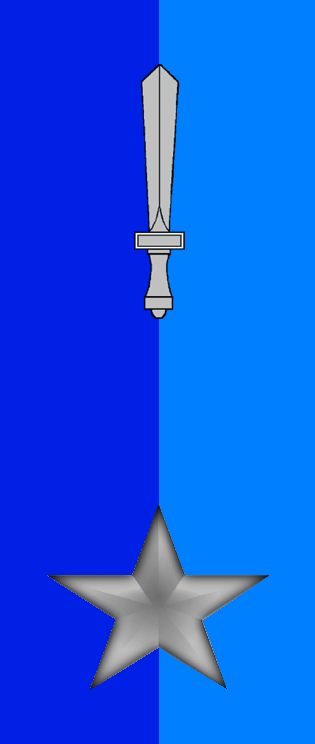
Cyberwarfare

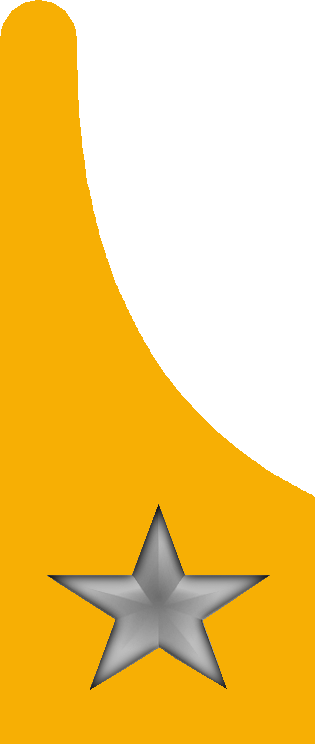
Autonomous units^{Note 6}
- Note 1: originally the 28th Infantry Regiment "Pavia", retains the regiment's patch with a superimposed yellow chess knight
- Note 2: originally infantry regiments, but now considered multi-arm units as they train troops for all arms and corps of the army
- Note 3: originally part of the artillery, therefore the patch retains the artillery's black and yellow
- Note 4: has the rank of a speciality of the army (i.e. ranks below the arms and corps of the army, but is set apart from them)
- Note 5: originally part of the artillery respectively the signal arm, therefore the patch combines the artillery's yellow and the signal arms' electric blue
- Note 6: includes army archives, army penitentiary units, etc.

== Infantry ==
=== Line infantry ===
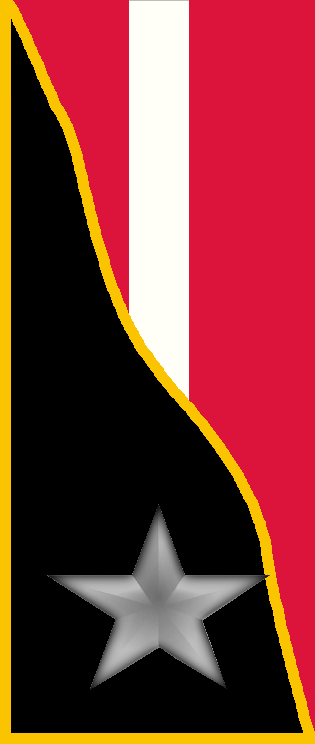
WWII: 5th Artillery rgt patch combining artillery & 91st/92nd "Basilicata" patches

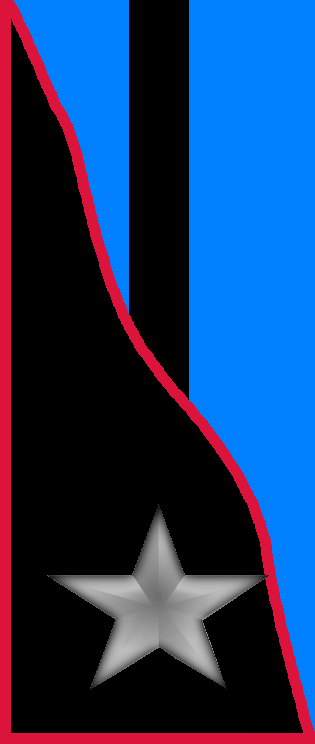
WWII: Engineer btn "Friuli" patch combining engineer & 87th/88th "Friuli" patches

Line infantry regiments wear rectangular gorget patches with a unique color combination for each regiment. Line infantry regiments were always raised in pairs, forming together a brigade and from 1936 a division. Originally the gorget patches of units from other arms and corps assigned to the division were overlaid on the gorget patch of the two regiments of a brigade or division. However, as after World War II infantry regiments with different gorget patches made up the army's divisions this practice was abandoned. Today the only exception is the Mechanized Brigade "Sassari", which still fields its two original regiments. Infantry personnel not assigned to a regiment wear a scarlet patch with two points. The 66th Infantry Regiment "Trieste" and 87th Infantry Regiment "Friuli" modified their gorget patches once they became part of the Airmobile Brigade "Friuli".

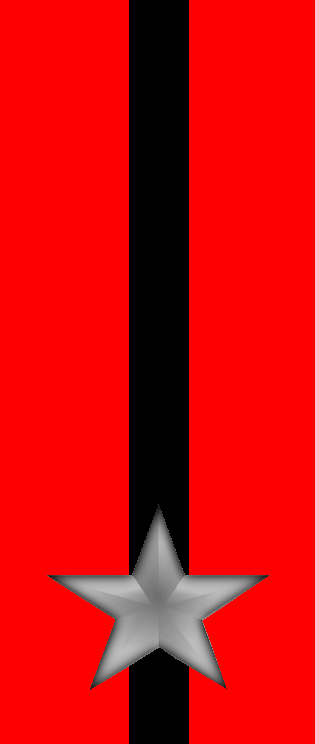
5th Infantry Regiment "Aosta"

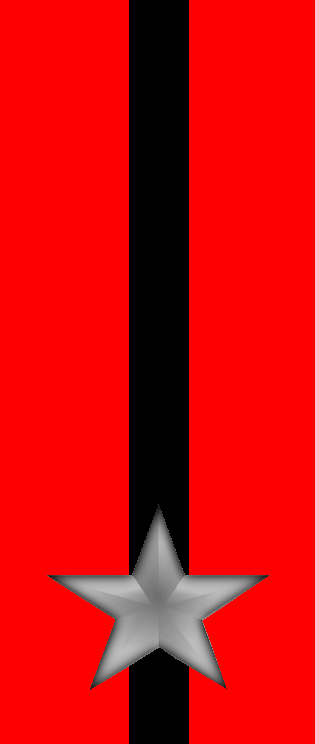
6th Command and Tactical Supports Unit "Aosta"

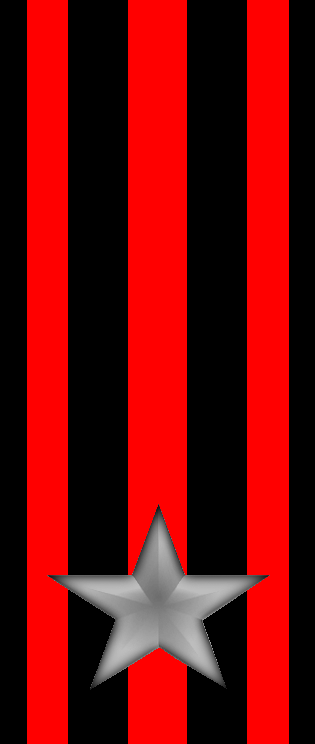
13th Command and Tactical Supports Unit "Pinerolo"

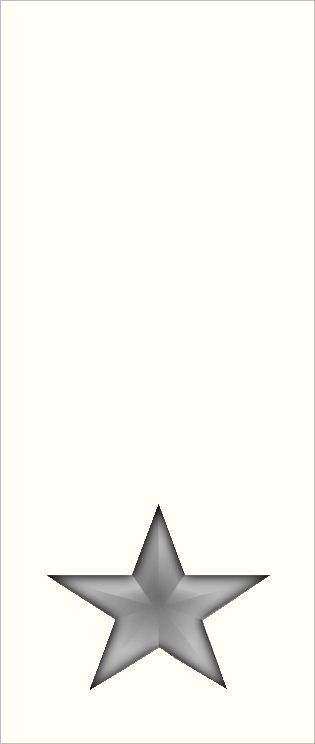
9th Infantry Regiment "Bari"

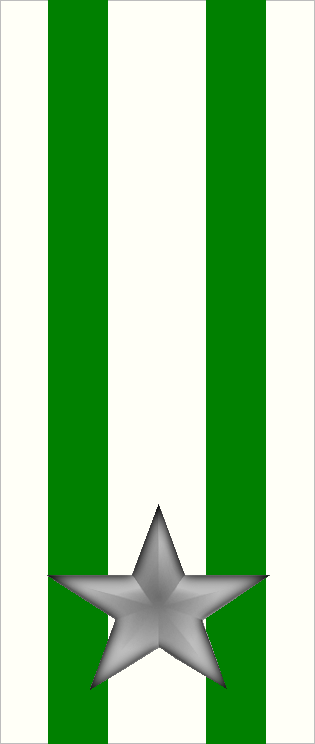
45th Command and Tactical Supports Unit "Reggio"

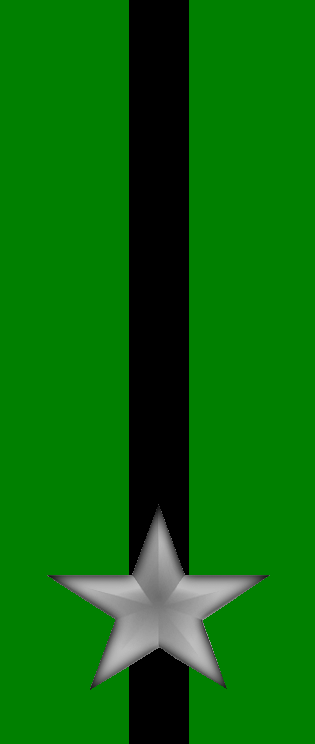
57th Command and Tactical Supports Unit "Abruzzi"

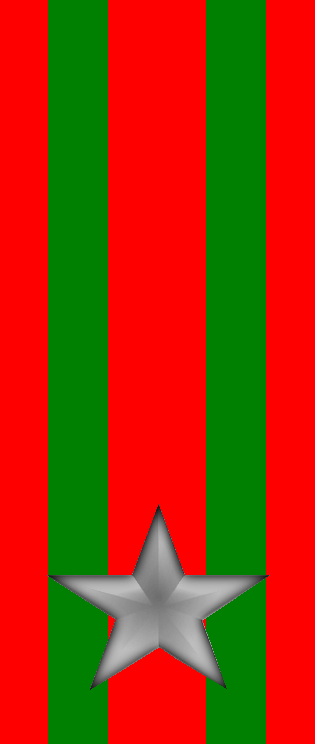
62nd Infantry Regiment "Sicilia"

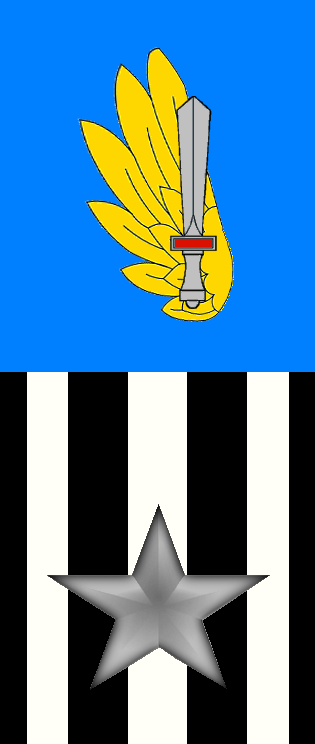
66th Airmobile Infantry Regiment "Trieste"

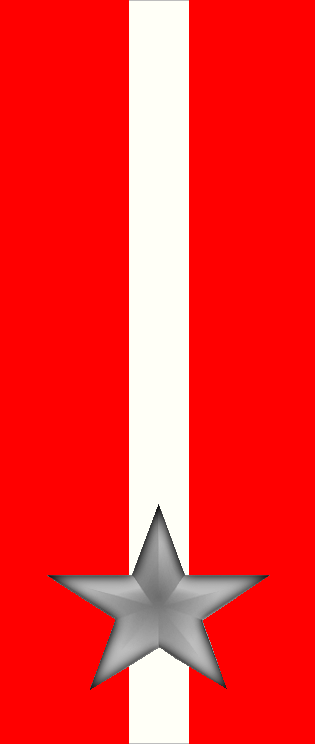
78th Command and Tactical Supports Unit "Lupi di Toscana"

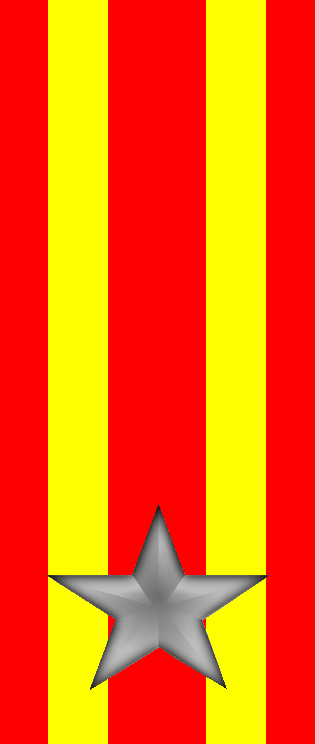
80th Regiment "Roma"

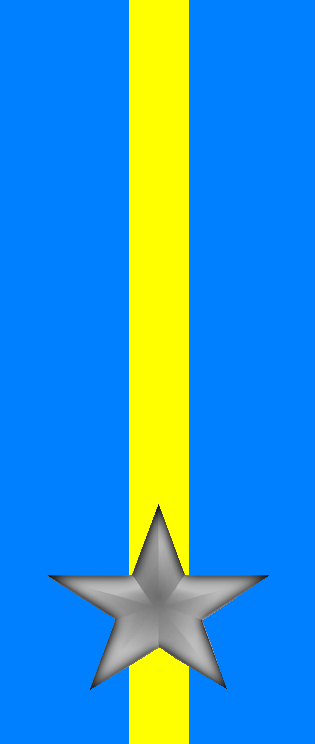
82nd Infantry Regiment "Torino"

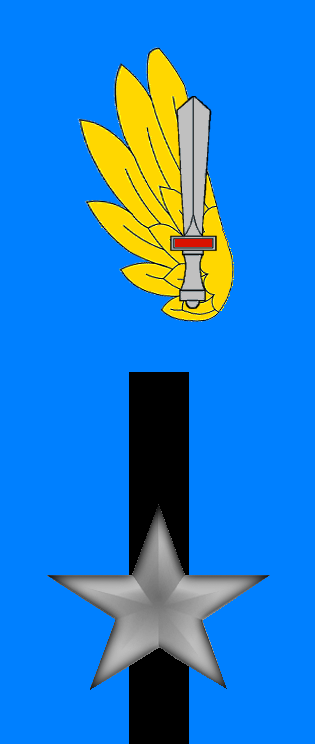
87th Command and Tactical Supports Unit "Friuli"

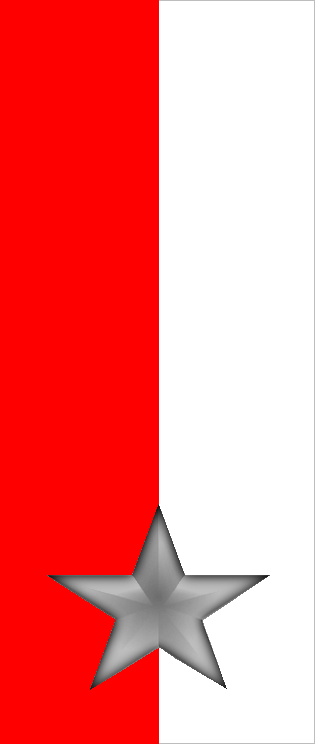
151st Infantry Regiment "Sassari"

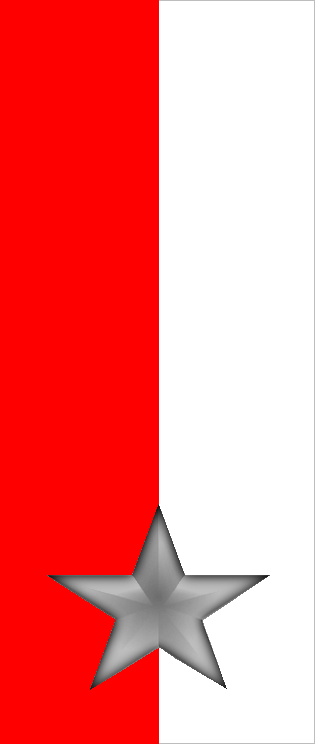
152nd Infantry Regiment "Sassari"

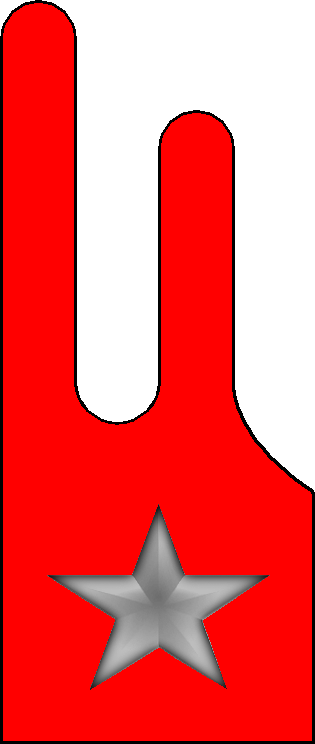
Unassigned infantry personnel

=== Infantry specialities ===
Infantry specialities are units that differ from the line infantry in their recruiting, equipment, headdress, tasks and training:

- Granatieri: originally grenadiers attached to every line regiment of the Royal Sardinian Army they became a royal guard regiment. Today the minimum height to join the speciality is 190 cm and members of the regiment wear a bearskin cap. Granatieri wear a double-sized, rectangular scarlet gorget patch with a stylized silver Austrian knot. The gorget patches of units from other arms and corps assigned to the Mechanized Brigade "Granatieri di Sardegna" are overlaid on the Grantieri's patch.
- Bersaglieri: originally skirmishers, scouts and sharpshooters of the Royal Sardinian Army. Members were chosen for their shooting skills and stamina. During the Cold War they were employed as mechanized infantry. Bersaglieri wear a red fez with their service uniform and wide-brimmed black hat with a bushel of wood grouse feathers to their ordinary and ceremonial uniforms. Bersaglieri wear a crimson gorget patch with two points.
- Alpini: originally mountain infantry recruited locally in the Alpine valleys. Alpini wear a brown felt cap with their service uniform and the Cappello Alpino with to their ordinary and ceremonial uniforms. Alpini wear a green gorget patch with two points. Unlike the Granatieri and Bersaglieri the Alpini have branched out and artillery, engineer, signals, transport and material, medical, etc. units have acquired the Alpini's headgear and traditions, which led to gorget patches that combine the Alpini's gorget patch with other arms and corps' gorget patches.
- Paracadutisti: the first paratrooper units were raised shortly before World War II and were an all-volunteer formation. Today the paratroopers retain above average requirements for recruits. Paracadutisti wear a red beret and azure rectangular gorget patches with a golden wing with seven feathers, a white parachute, and a silver Gladius with scarlet crossguard. Like the Alpini the Paracadutisti have branched out and units from other arms and corps assigned to the Paratroopers Brigade "Folgore" and the Army Special Forces Command wear now a combination of their gorget patch and the Paracadutisti's patch.
- Lagunari: are the army's youngest speciality, and were raised to defend the Venetian lagoon (Italian: Laguna di Venezia). Originally they were recruited from Venice and the communities surrounding the Venetian lagoon. They wear a green beret and scarlet rectangular gorget patches with a tapered top, below which the winged golden Lion of Saint Mark with a white aureola, holding a sword in his right paw and resting his left paw on a closed bible. Behind the lion are two crossed rifles and an anchor and above him a golden crown.

Until 1 June 1999 the Carristi (Tankers) were a speciality of the infantry, which on that date was transferred to the cavalry.

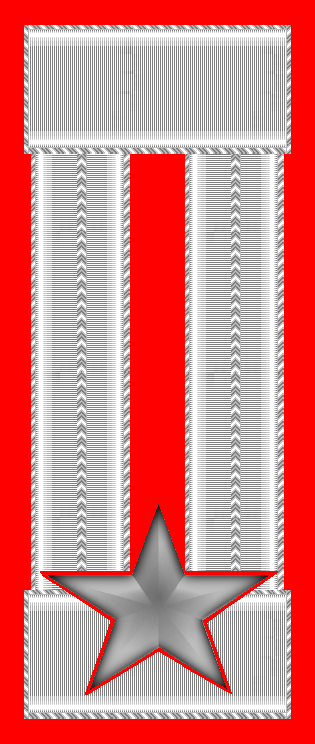
Granatieri

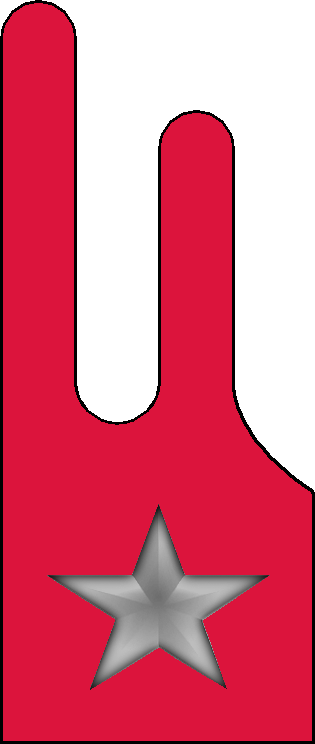
Bersaglieri

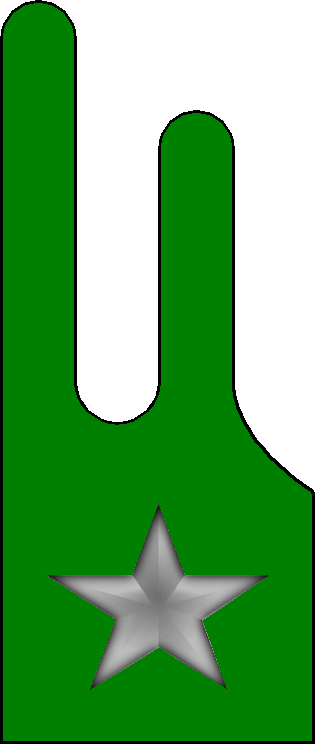
Alpini

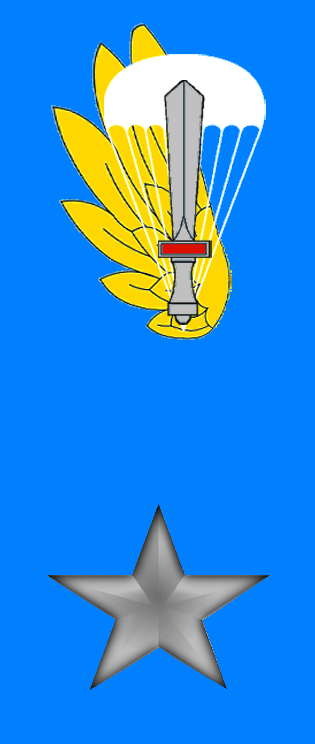
Paracadutisti

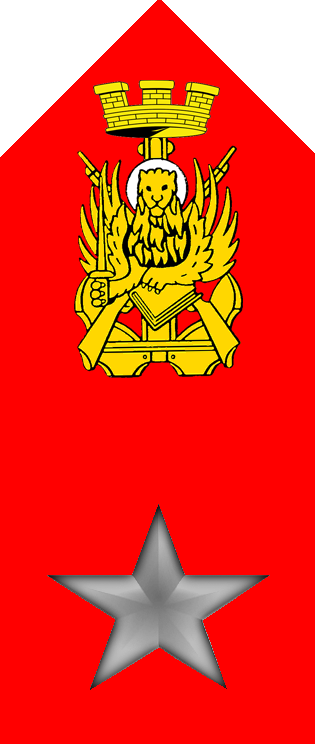
Lagunari

=== Special forces ===
The army's three special forces regiment's combine the infantry speciality gorget patch with two points and the paratroopers symbol, with the color of the speciality they descend from. Green for the Alpini, Azure for the Paracadutisti, and black for the Arditi, a World War I infantry speciality disestablished in 1920.

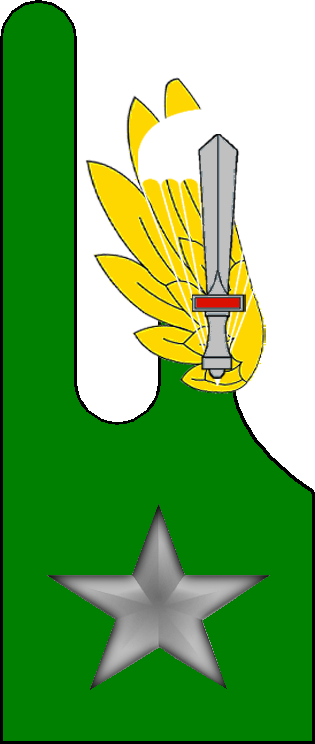
4th Alpini Paratroopers Regiment

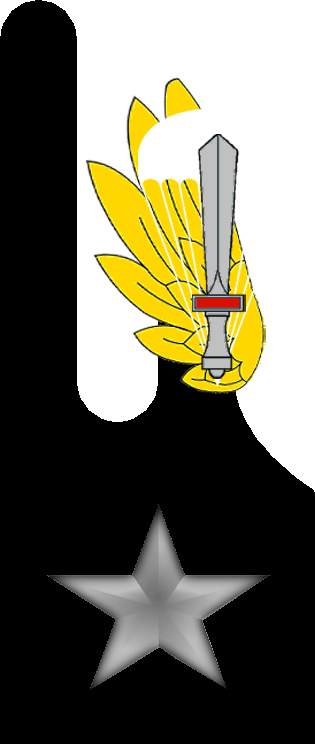
9th Paratroopers Assault Regiment "Col Moschin"

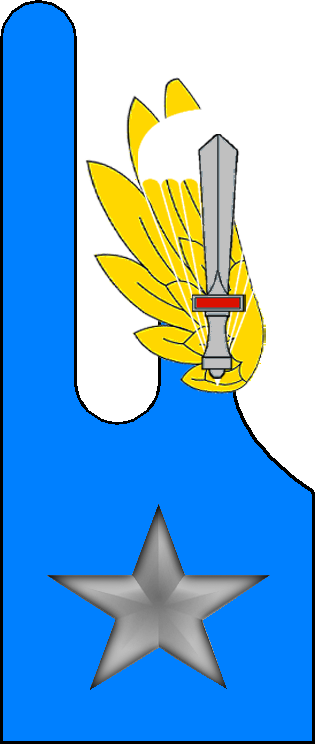
185th Paratroopers Recon Rgt. "Folgore"

=== Disbanded line infantry regiments ===
The gorget patches of disbanded regiments are an integral part of each regiment's traditions and insignia. In case one of the regiments listed below is reformed, then the corresponding gorget patch will be issued to regiment's personnel. Italian infantry regiments were always raised in pairs, which formed together one brigade. The regiments were initially only numbered and identified as "[regiment's number] Regiment of the Brigade "[brigade's name]"". Only during World War I did the brigade's name pass to the regiments. Before World War II the army formed binary divisions with sister regiments, which in some cases received the name of the division they were assigned to. If such a renaming occurred during World War II the division's name follows the regiment's name in brackets: i.e. the 65th and 66th Regiments "Valtellina" entered the 101st Motorized Division "Trieste" and were renamed "Trieste". Therefore, in the list below these two regiments are listed as: "65th, [66th] Regiment "Valtellina" ("Trieste")".

The regiments 1 to 18 were formed before 1848 as units of the Royal Sardinian Army. The regiments 19 to 94 were formed between the First Italian War of Independence and 1884. The regiments 95 to 282, with the exception of the 182nd, were raised during World War I. The 182nd Infantry Regiment "Garibaldi" is the only Italian infantry regiment raised after World War II and the only regiment of the army to not have received gorget patches. The regiment's 233 to 282 were raised in 1917 and received gorget patches divided horizontally twice. The 291st and 292nd Infantry Regiment "Zara" were raised during World War II. The regiments of the 300 series were raised during World War II to augment some of the binary divisions. Regiments, whose flags are currently assigned to active units, are in square brackets.

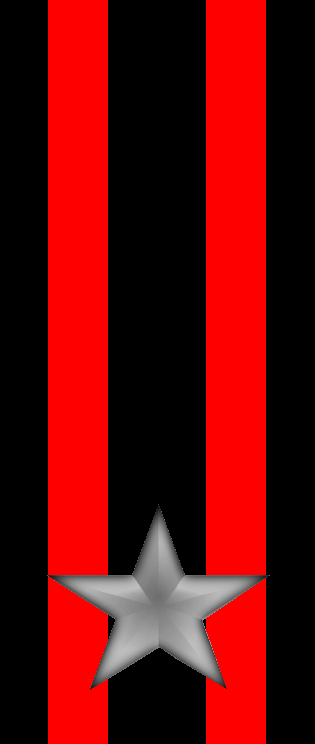
1st, 2nd Regiment "San Giusto" ("Re")

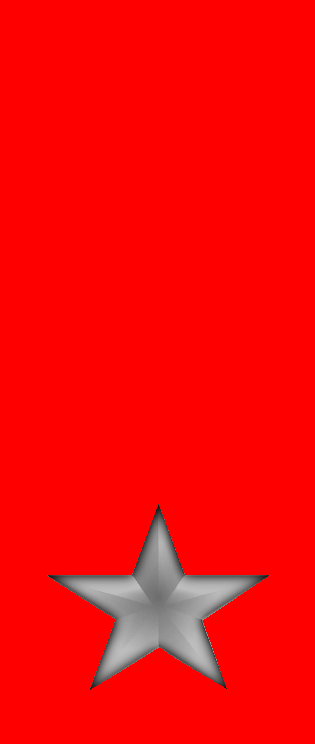
3rd, 4th, 303rd Regiment "Piemonte"

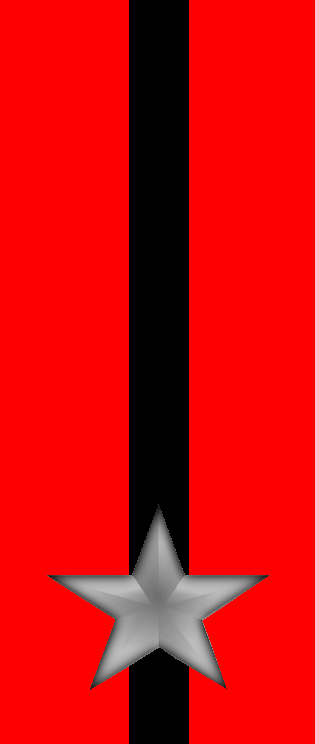
[5th], [6th] Regiment "Aosta"

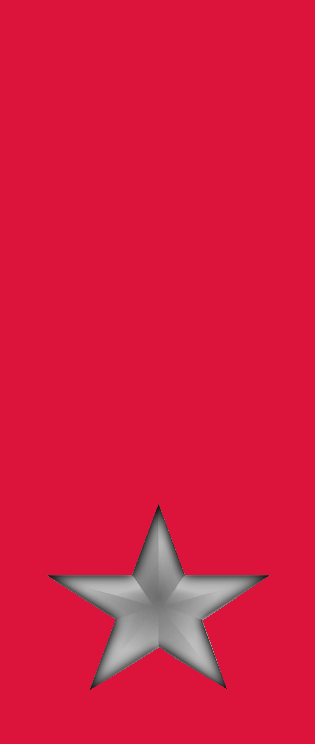
7th, 8th Regiment "Cuneo"

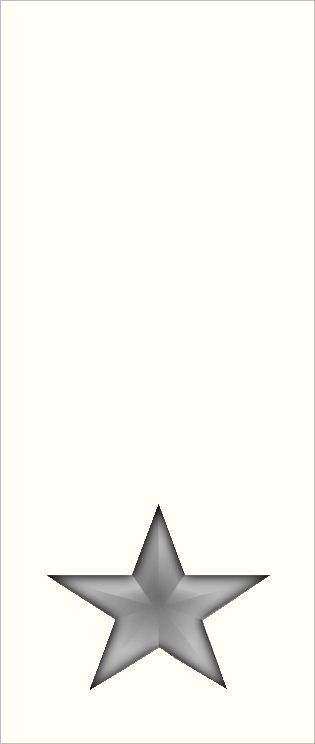
[9th], 10th, 309th Rgt. "Bari" ("Regina")

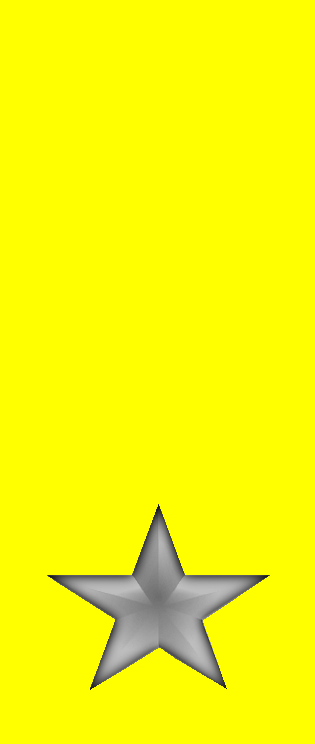
11th, 12th, 311th Regiment "Casale"

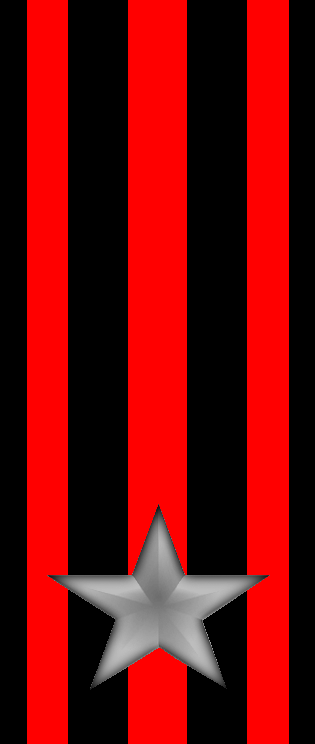
[13th], 14th, 313th Regiment "Pinerolo"

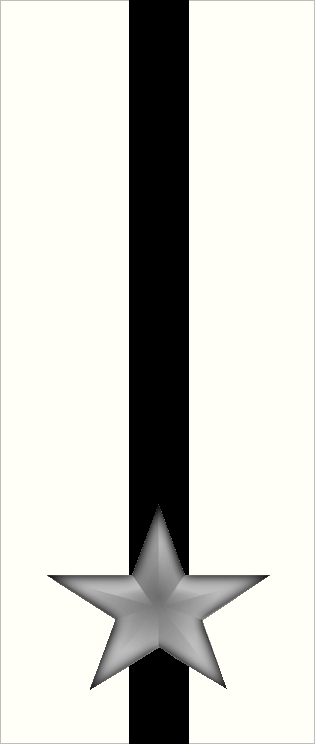
15th, 16th Regiment "Savona"

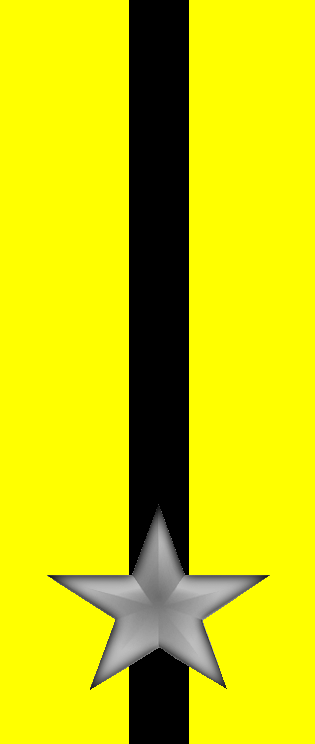
[17th], 18th, 317th Regiment "Acqui"

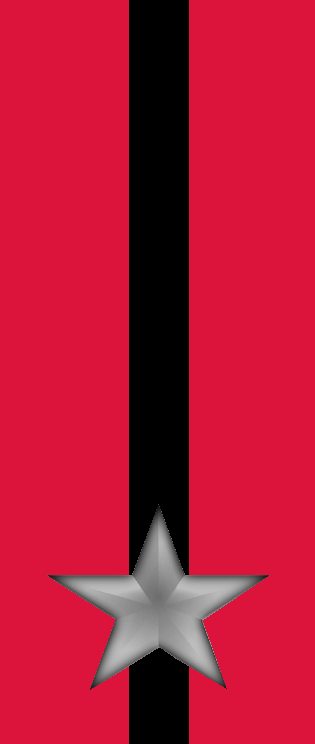
19th, 20th Regiment "Brescia"

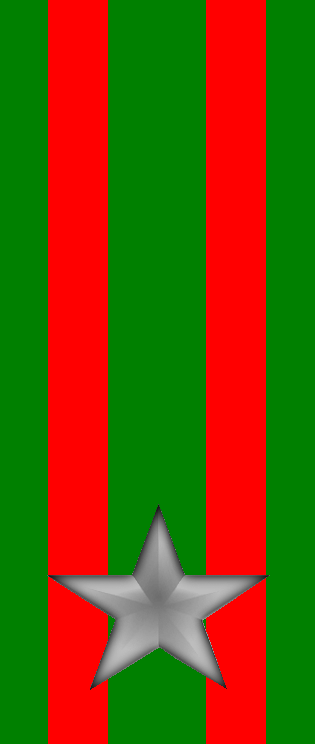
21st, 22nd, 321st Regiment "Cremona"

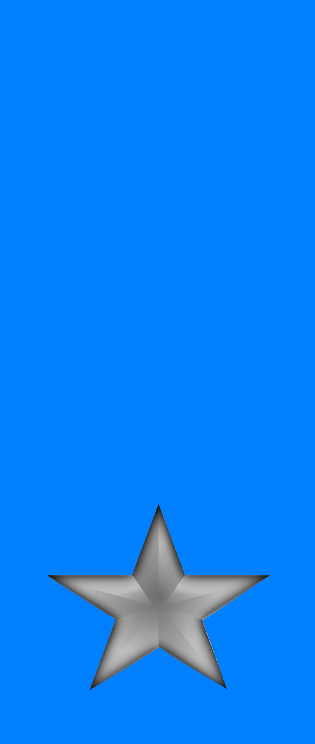
23rd, 24th Regiment "Como" ("Isonzo")

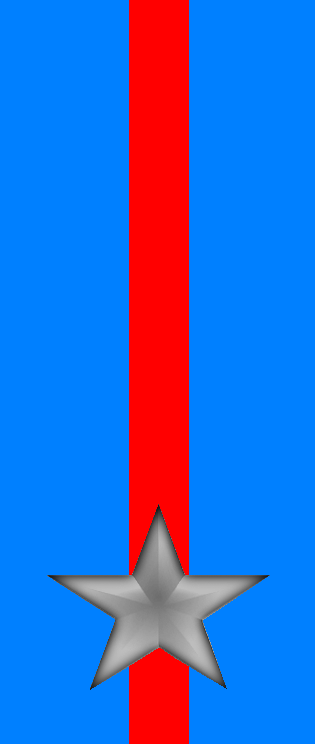
25th, 26th Regiment "Bergamo"

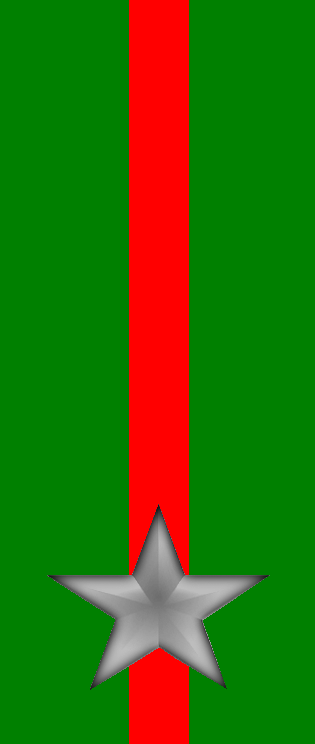
27th, 28th Regiment "Pavia"

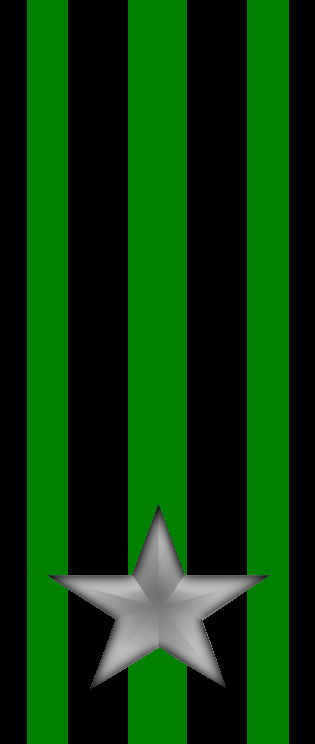
29th, 30th Regiment "Pisa" ("Assietta")

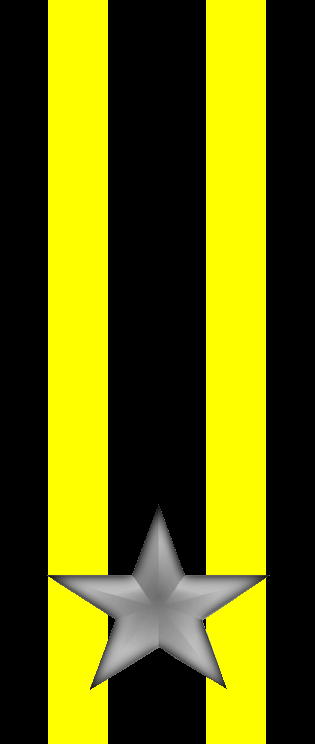
31st, 32nd Regiment "Siena"

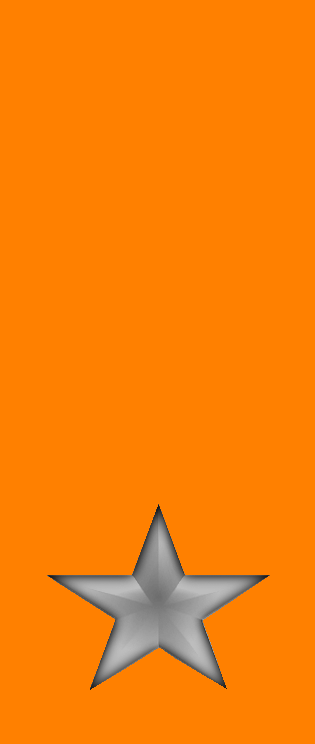
33rd, 34th Regiment "Livorno"

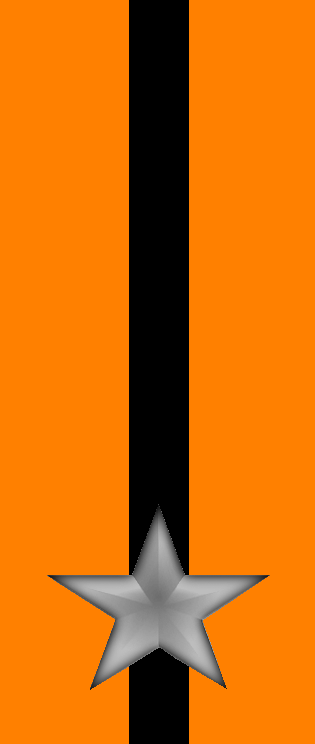
35th, 36th, 336th Regiment "Pistoia"

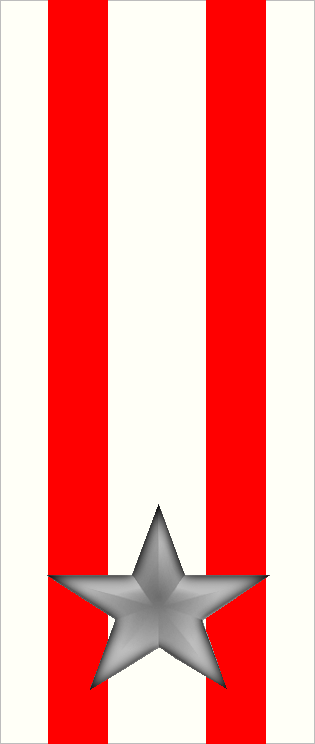
37th, 38th Regiment "Ravenna"

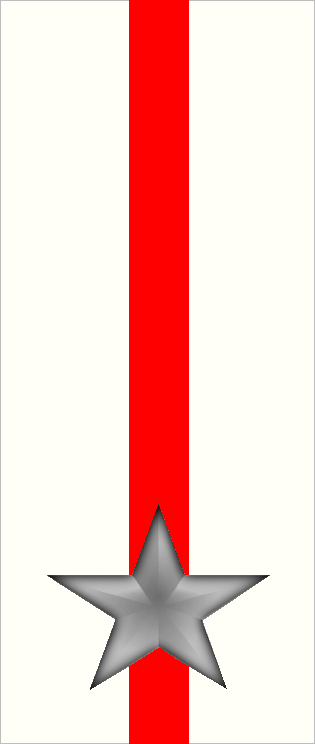
39th, 40th Regiment "Bologna"

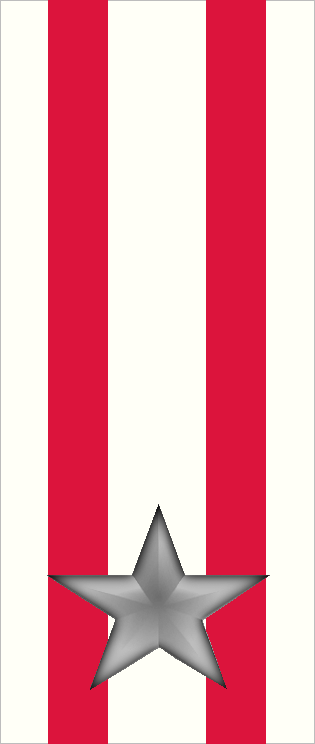
41st, 42nd, 341st Regiment "Modena"

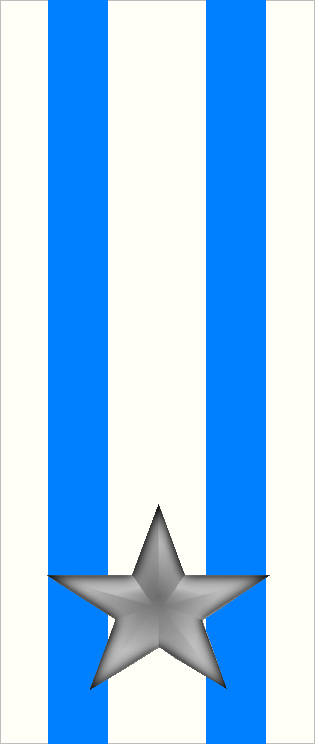
43rd, 44th, 343rd Regiment "Forlì"

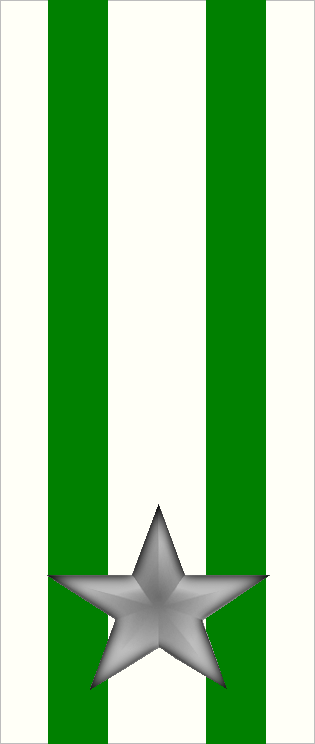
[45th], 46th Regiment "Reggio" ("Sabauda")

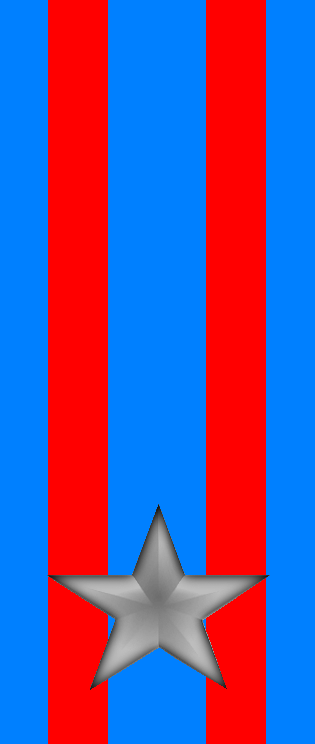
47th, 48th Regiment "Ferrara"

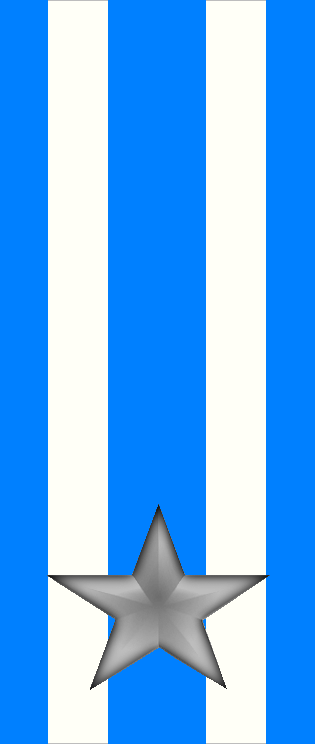
49th, 50th, 350th Regiment "Parma"

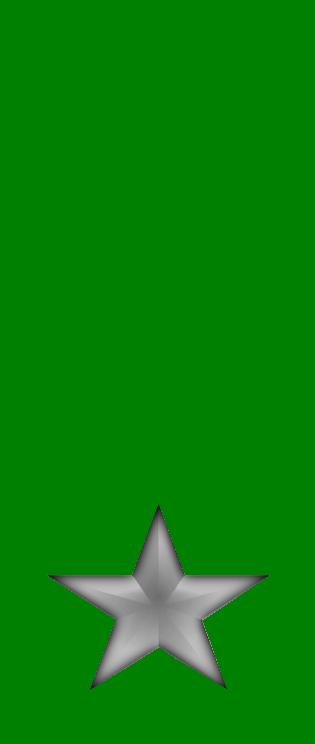
51st, 52nd Regiment "Alpi"

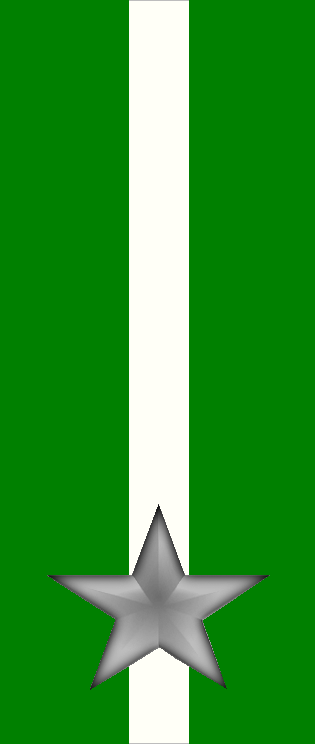
53rd, 54th Regiment "Umbria" ("Sforzesca")

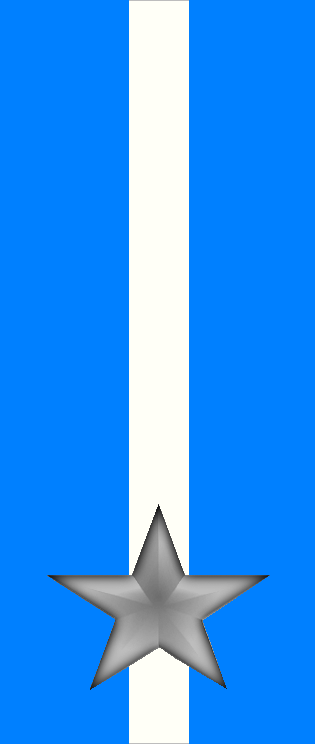
55th, 56th Regiment "Marche"

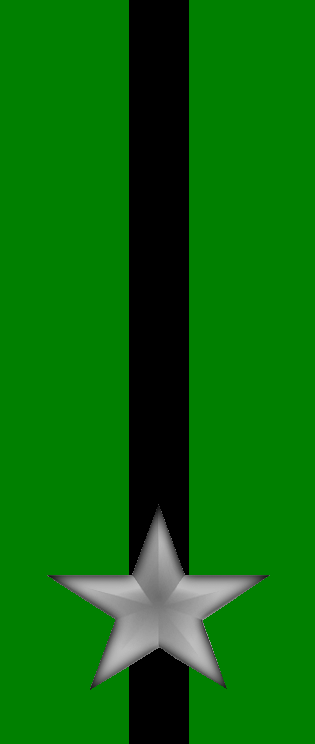
[57th], 58th Regiment "Abruzzi" ("Piave")

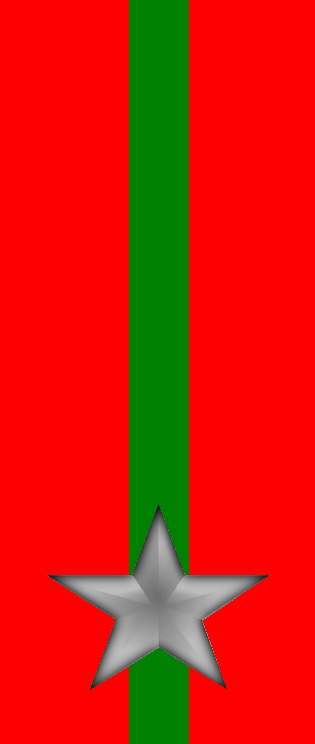
59th, 60th, 359th Regiment "Calabria"

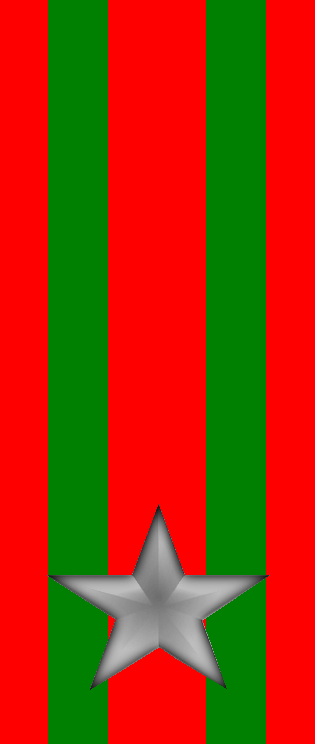
61st, [62nd] Regiment "Sicilia" ("Trento")

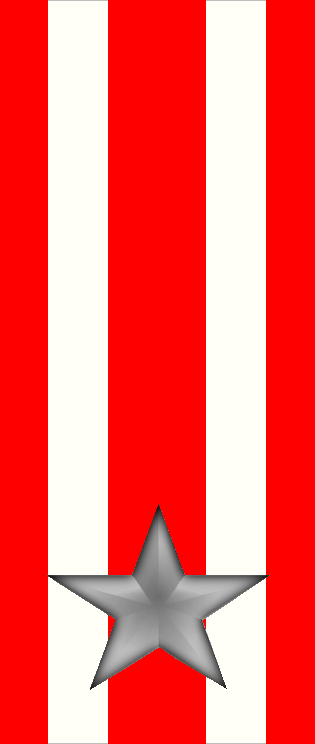
63rd, 64th, 363rd Regiment "Cagliari"

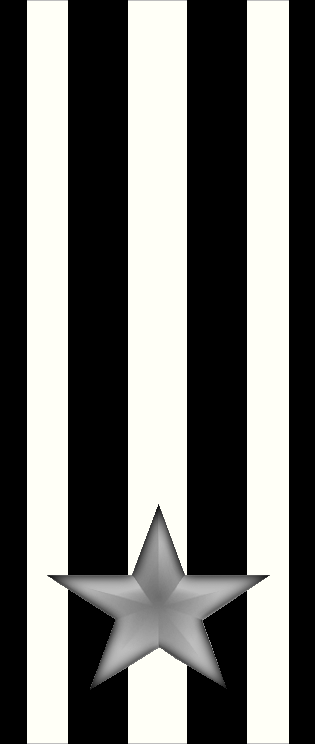
65th, [66th] Rgt. "Valtellina" ("Trieste")

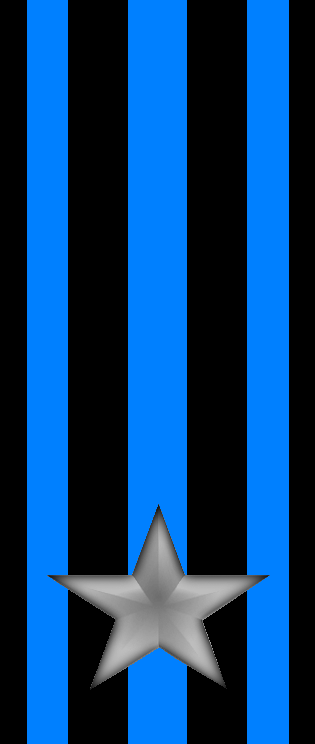
67th, 68th Regiment "Palermo" ("Legnano")

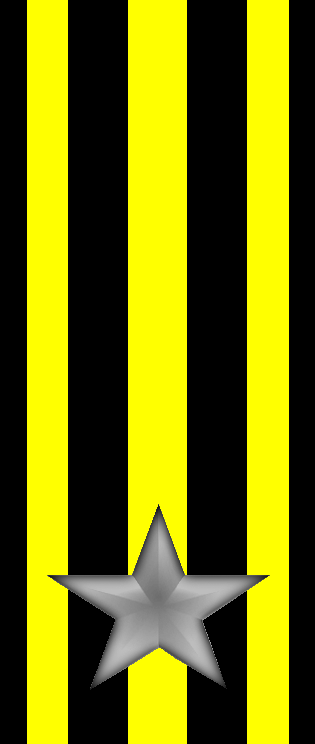
69th, 70th Regiment "Ancona" ("Sirte")

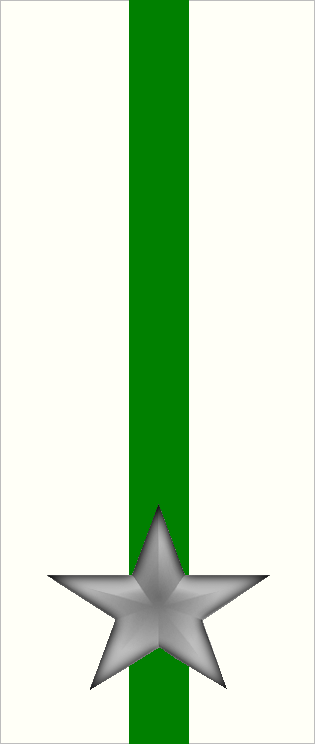
71st, 72nd Regiment "Puglie"

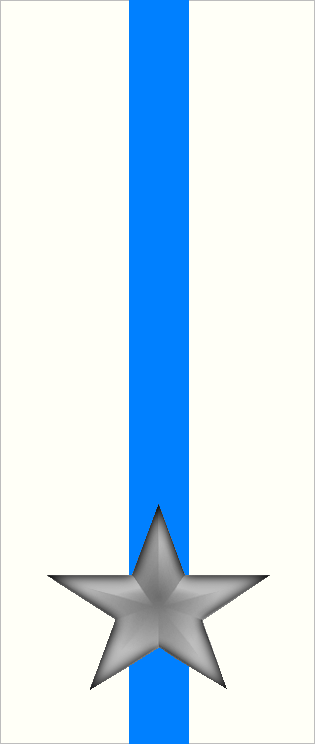
73rd, 74th Regiment "Lombardia"

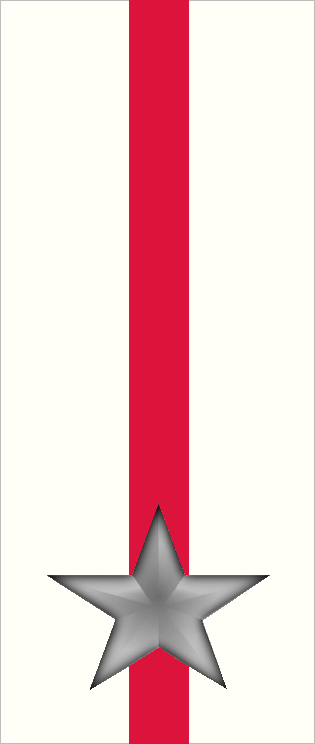
75th, 76th Regiment "Napoli"

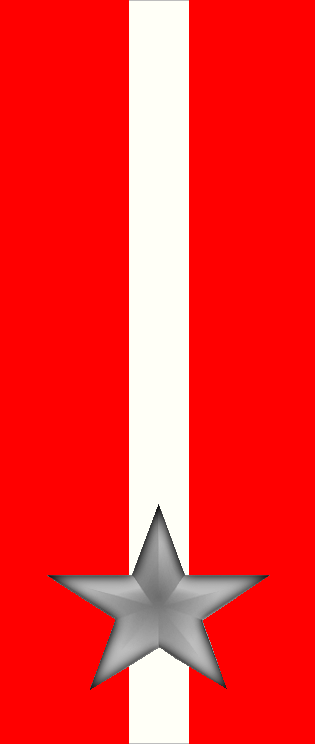
77th, [78th] Regiment "Lupi di Toscana"

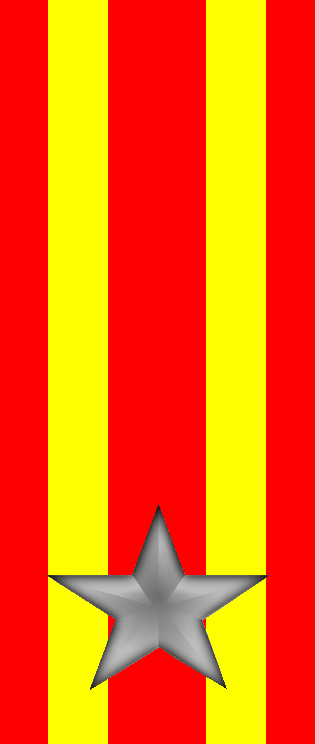
79th, [80th] Regiment "Roma" ("Pasubio")

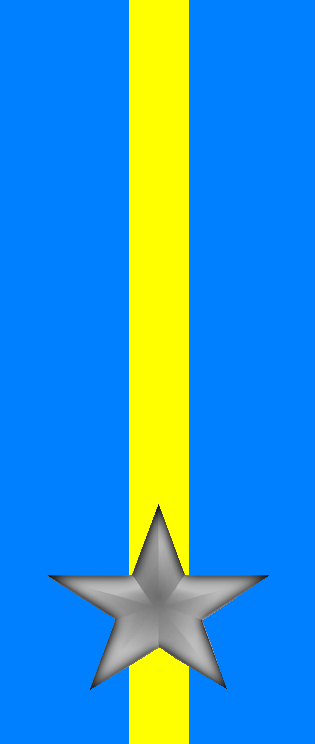
81st, [82nd] Regiment "Torino"

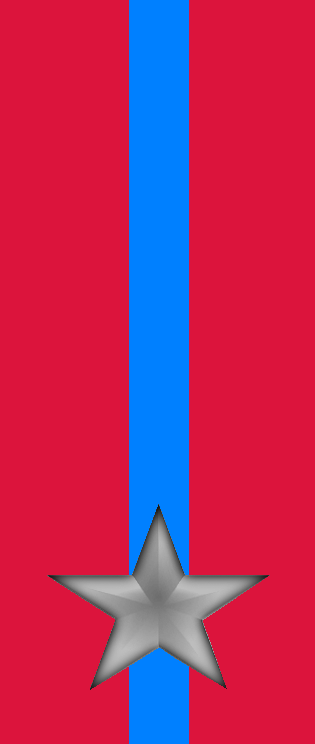
83rd, 84th, 383rd Regiment "Venezia"

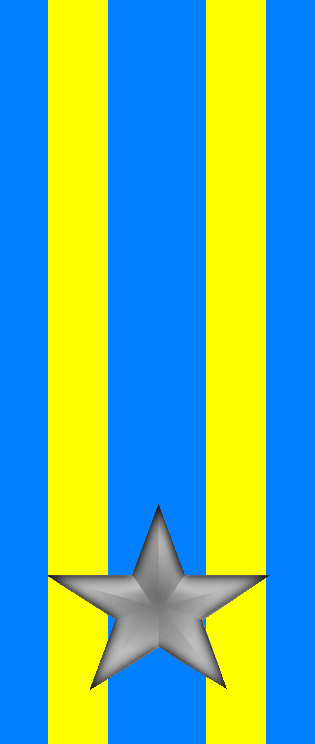
[85th], 86th Regiment "Verona" ("Sabratha")

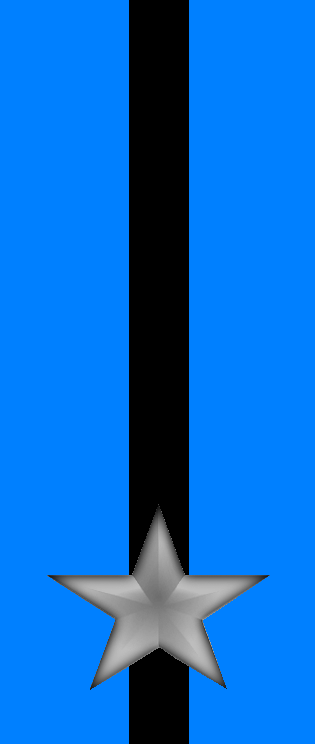
[87th], 88th, 387th Regiment "Friuli"

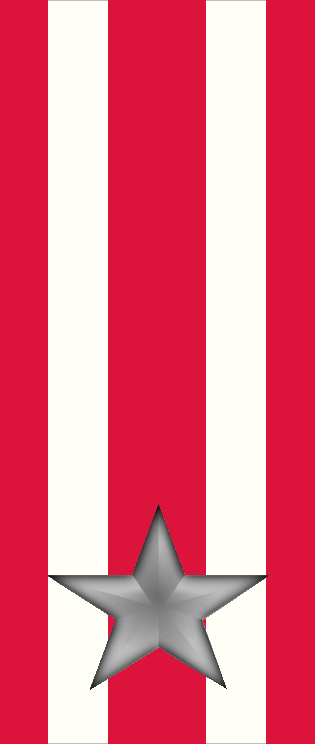
89th, 90th Regiment "Salerno" ("Cosseria")

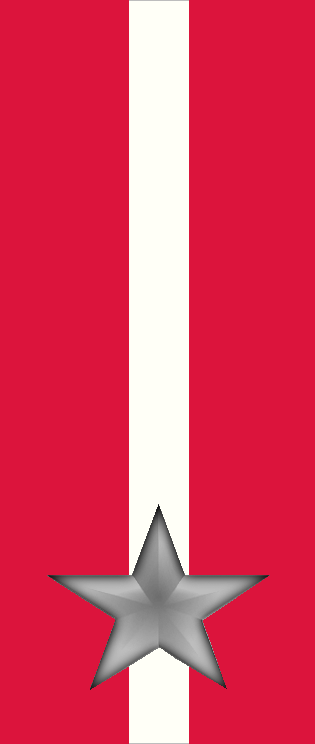
91st, 92nd Regiment "Basilicata" ("Superga")

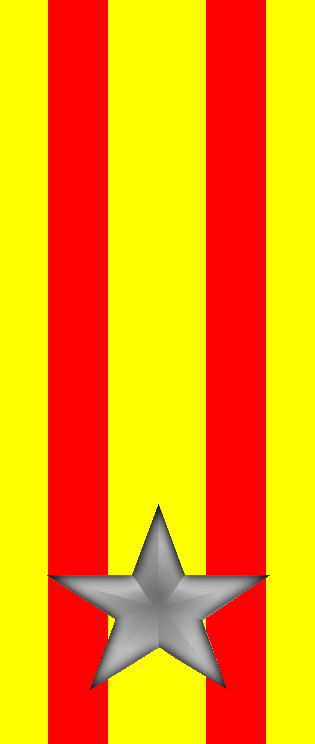
93rd, 94th Regiment "Messina"

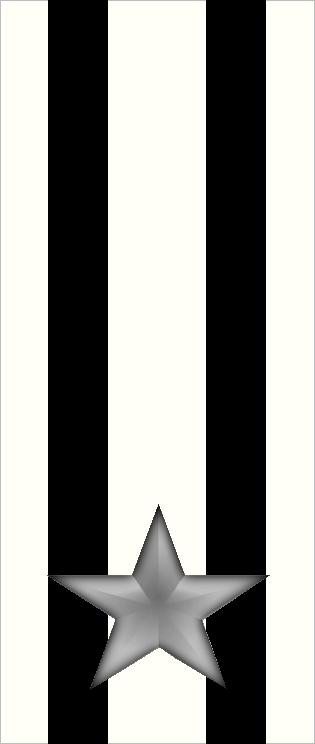
95th, 96th Regiment "Udine"

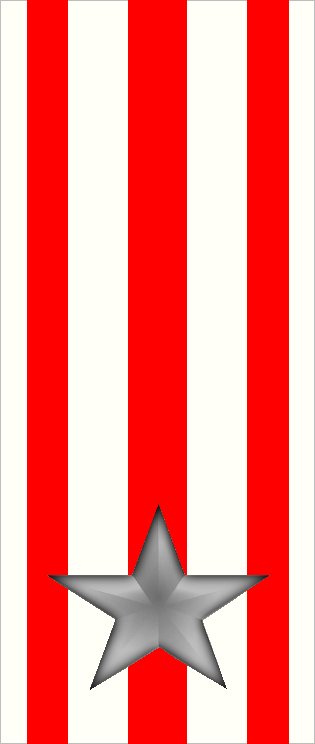
98th, 97th Regiment "Genova"

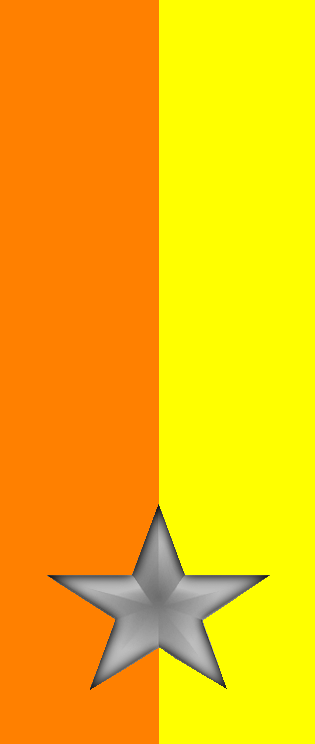
99th, 100th Regiment "Treviso"

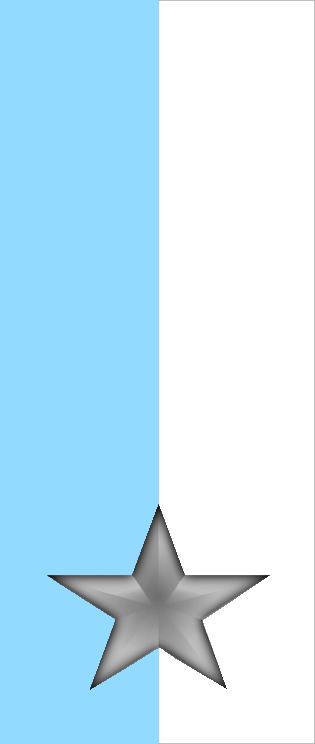
111th, 112th Regiment "Piacenza"

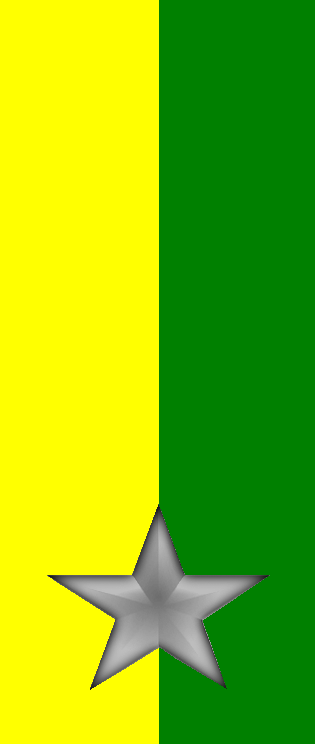
113th, 114th Regiment "Mantova"

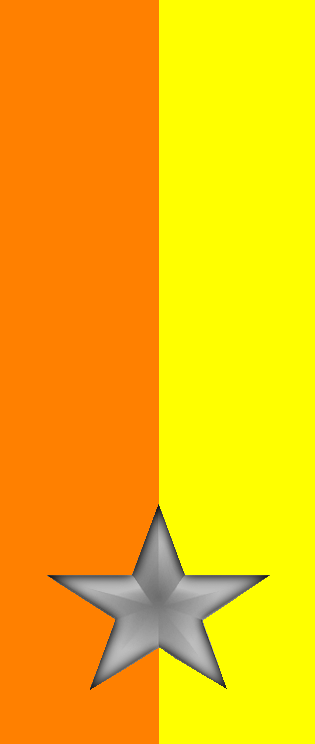
115th, 116th Rgt. "Treviso" ("Marmarica")

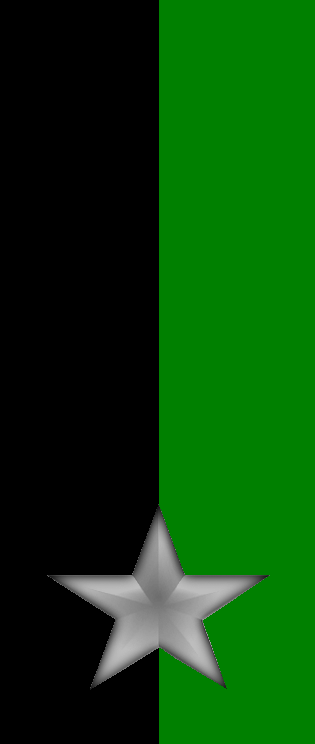
117th, 118th Regiment "Padova"

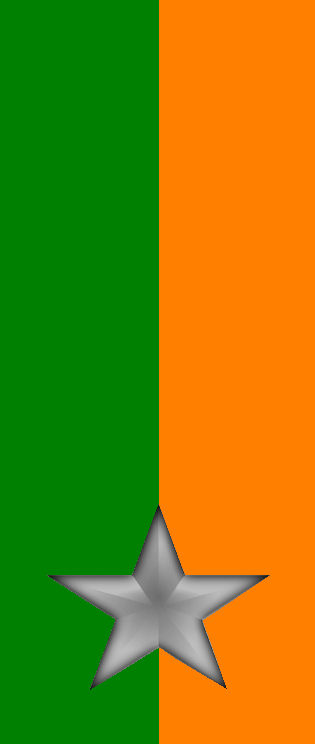
119th, 120th Regiment "Emilia"

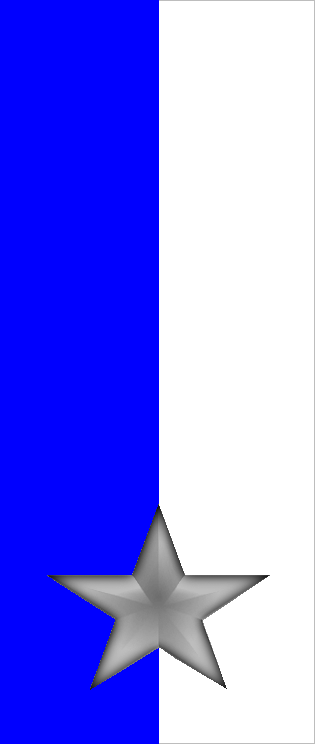
121st, 122nd Regiment "Macerata"

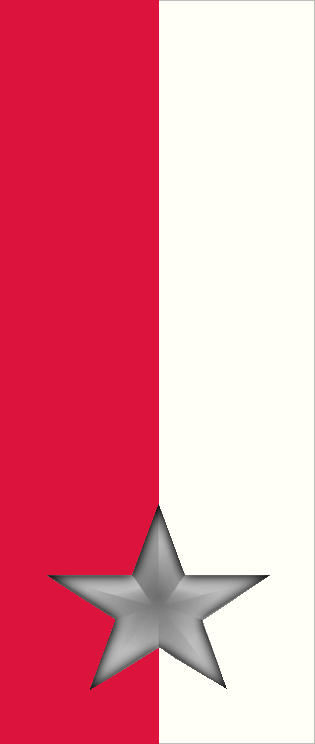
123rd, 124th Regiment "Chieti"

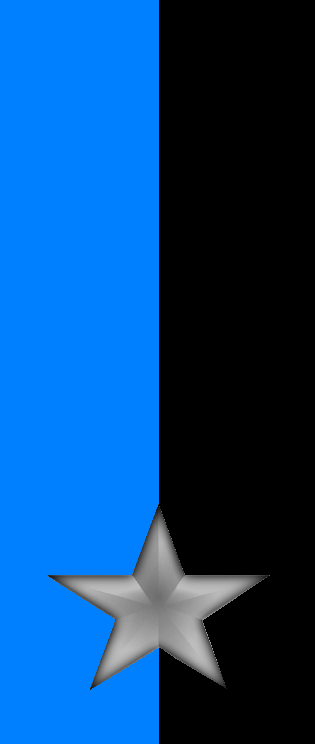
125th, 126th Regiment "La Spezia"

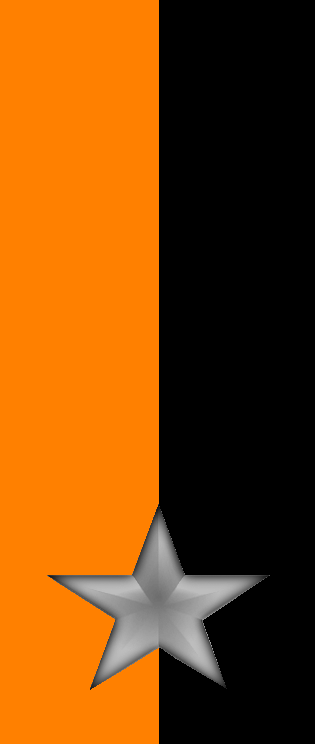
127th, 128th Regiment "Firenze"

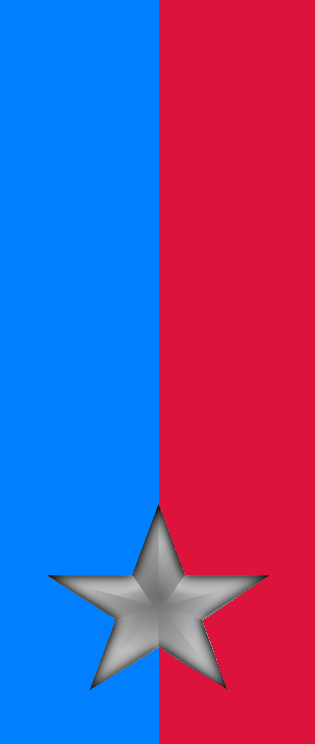
129th, 130th Regiment "Perugia"

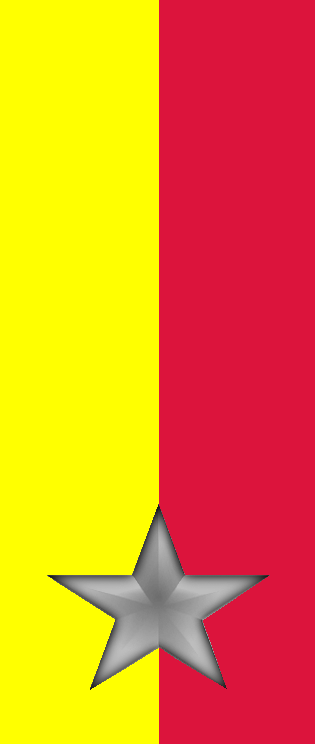
131st, 132nd Regiment "Lazio"

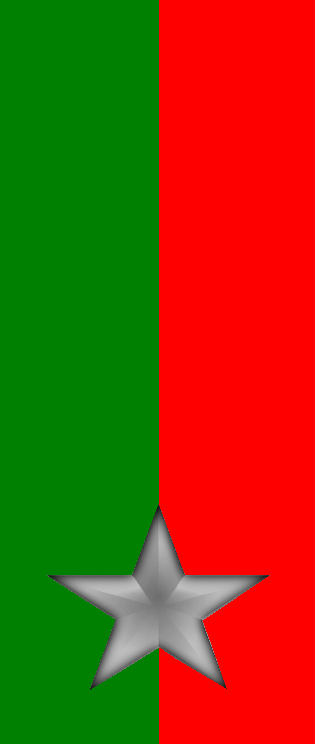
133rd, 134th Regiment "Benevento"

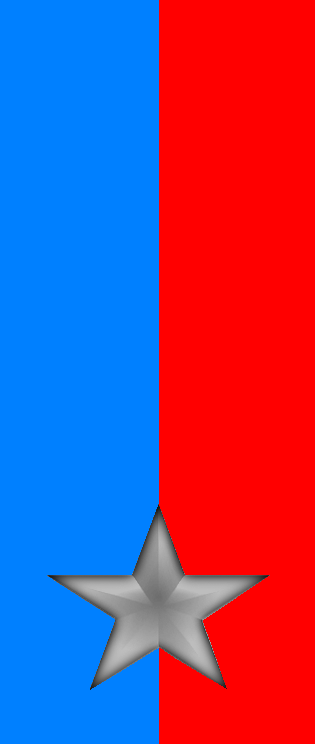
135th, 136th Regiment "Campania"

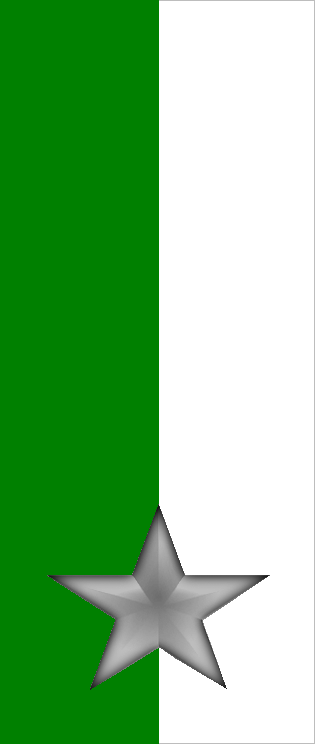
137th, 138th Regiment "Barletta"

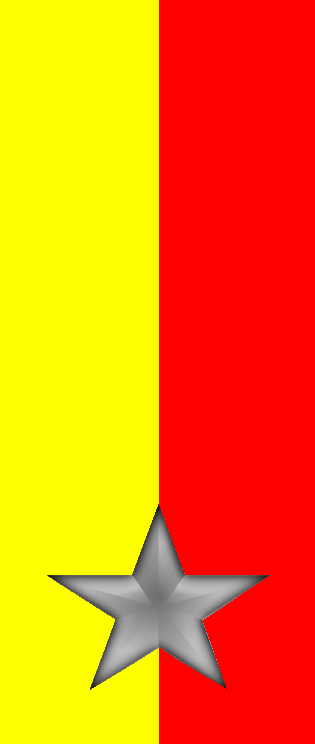
139th, 140th, 340th Regiment "Bari"

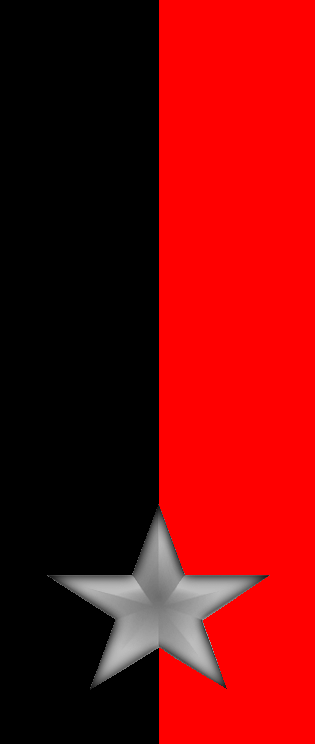
141st, 142nd Regiment "Catanzaro"

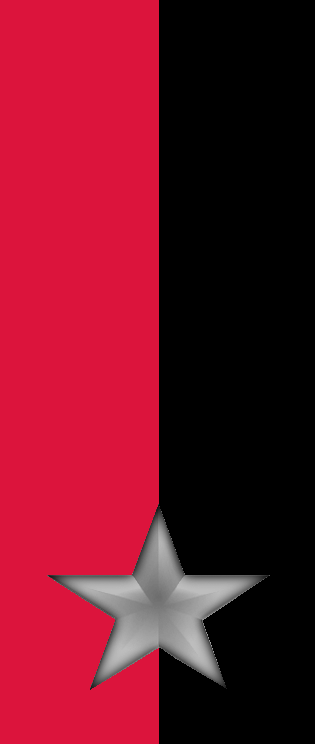
143rd, 144th Regiment "Taranto"

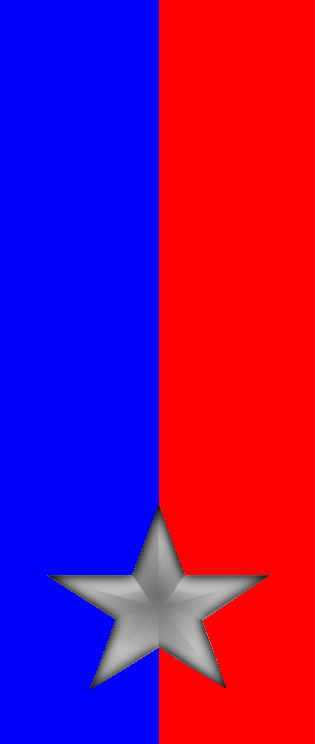
145th, 146th Regiment "Catania"

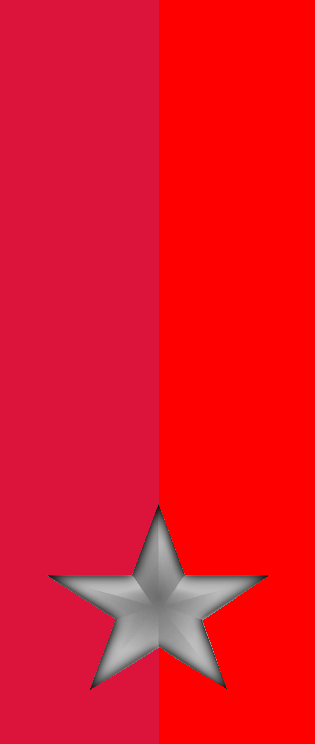
147th, 148th Regiment "Caltanissetta"

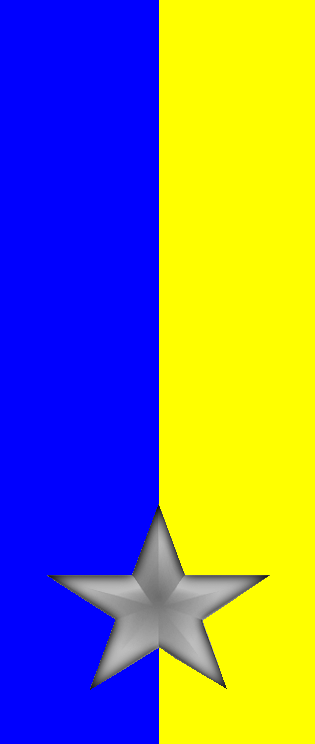
149th, 150th Regiment "Trapani"

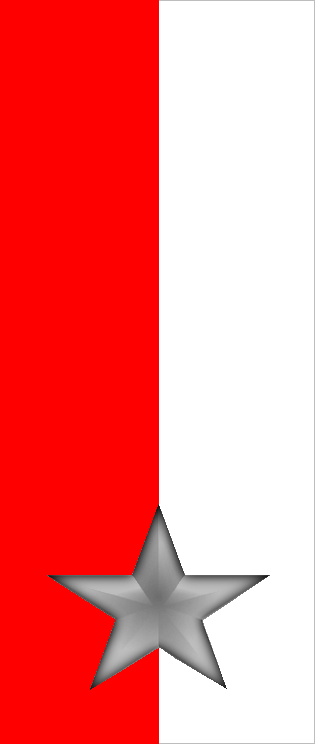
[151st], [152nd] Regiment "Sassari"

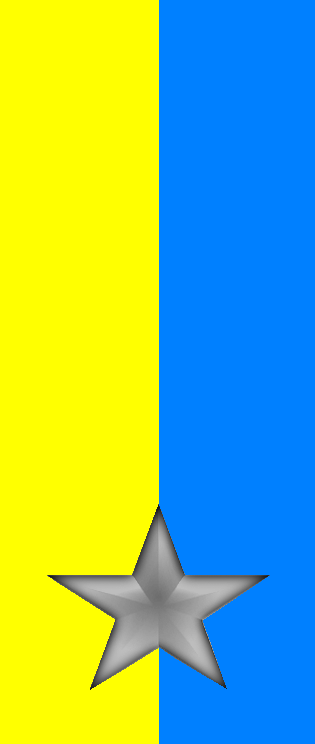
153rd, 154th Regiment "Novara"

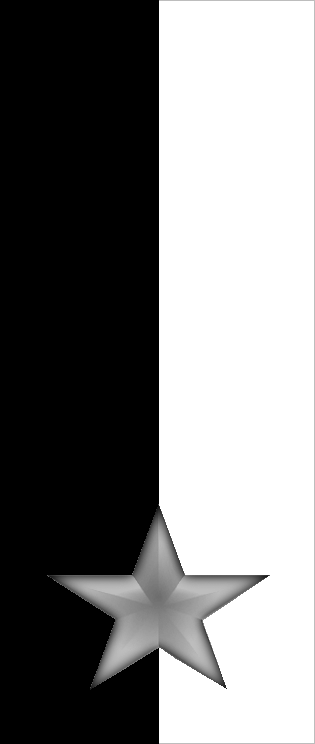
155th, 156th Regiment "Alessandria"

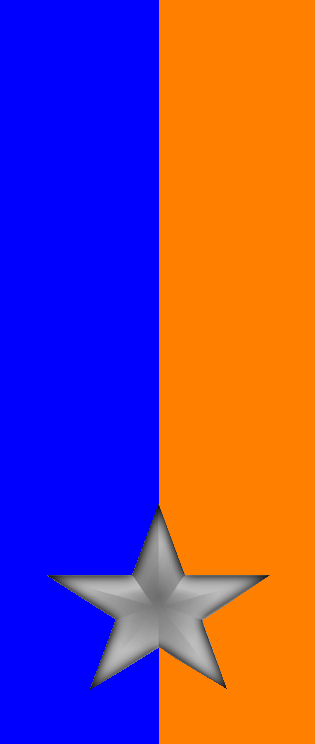
157th, 158th, 165th Rgt. "Liguria" ("Cirene")

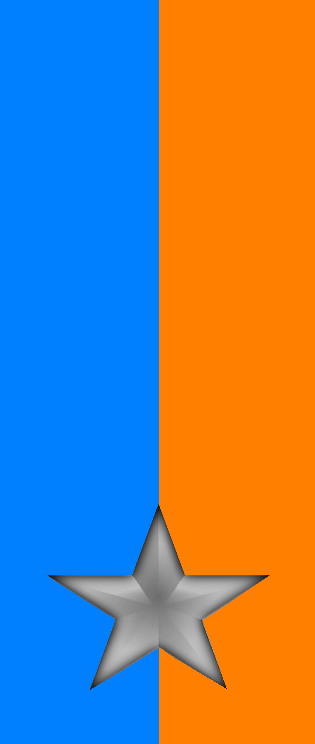
159th, 160th Regiment "Milano"

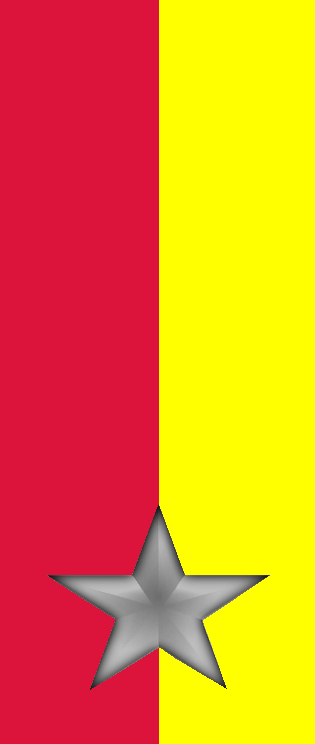
161st, 162nd Regiment "Ivrea"

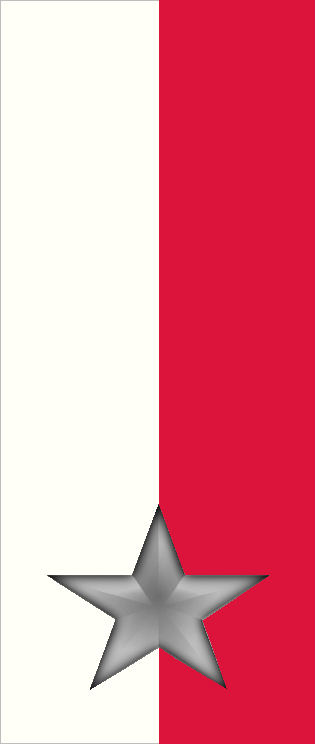
163rd, 164th Regiment "Lucca"

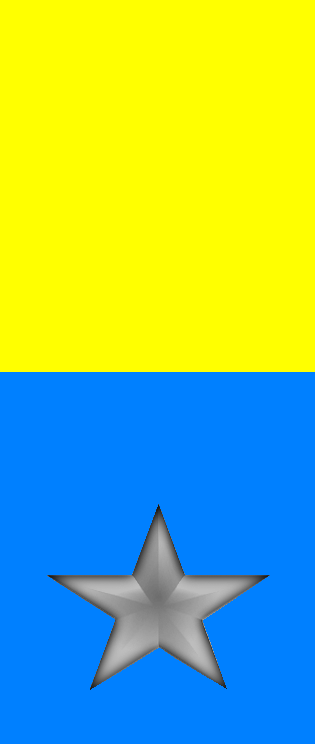
201st, 202nd Regiment "Sesia"

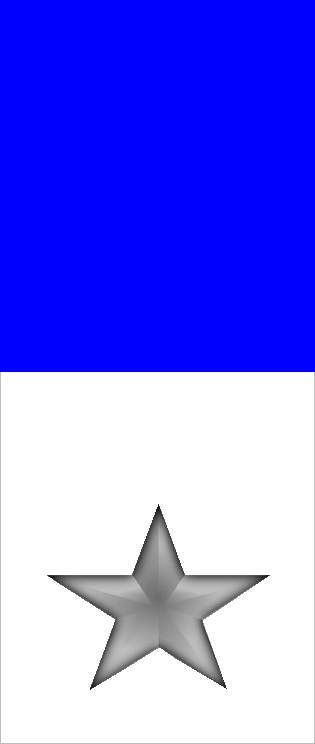
203rd, 204th Regiment "Tanaro"

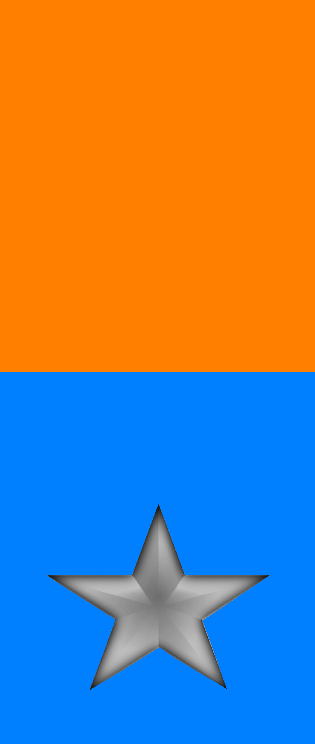
205th, 206th Regiment "Lambro"

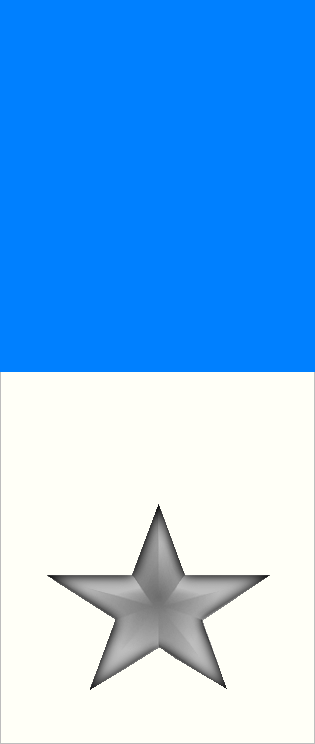
207th, 208th Regiment "Taro"

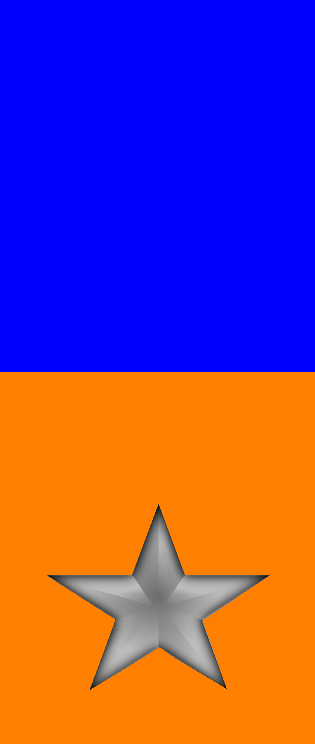
209th, 210th Regiment "Bisagno"

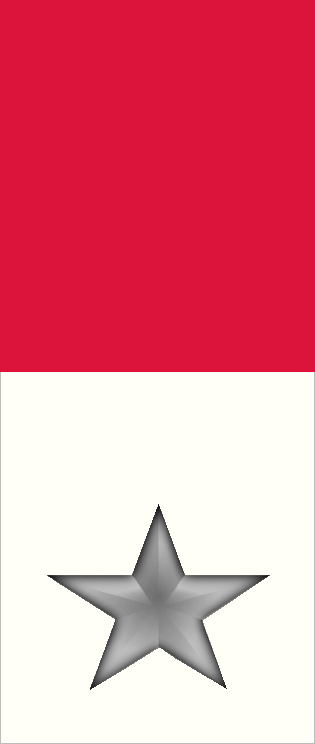
211th, 212th Regiment "Pescara"

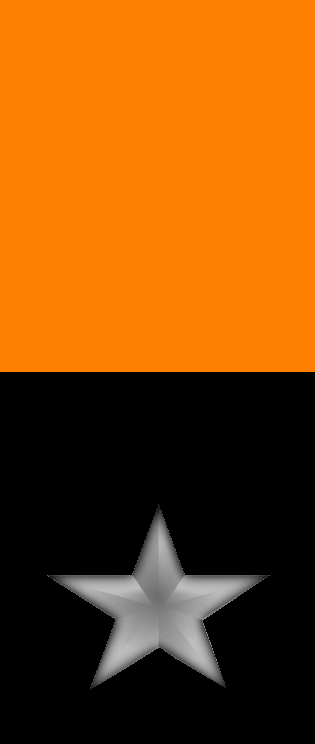
213th, 214th Regiment "Arno"

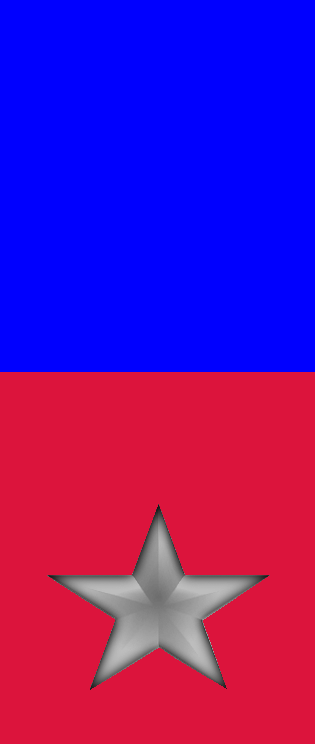
215th, 216th Regiment "Tevere"

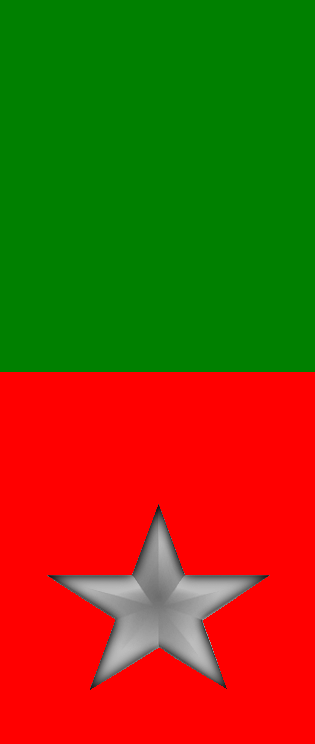
217th, 218th Regiment "Volturno"

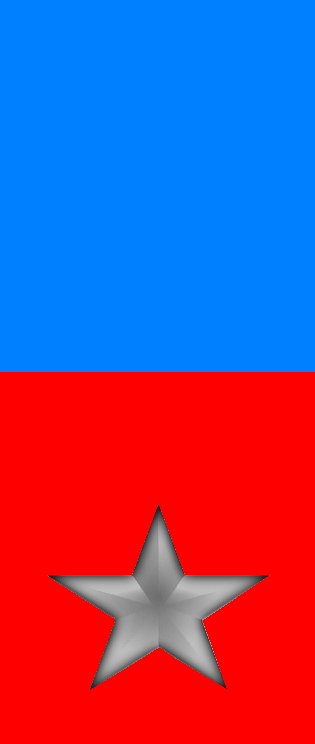
219th, 220th Regiment "Sele"

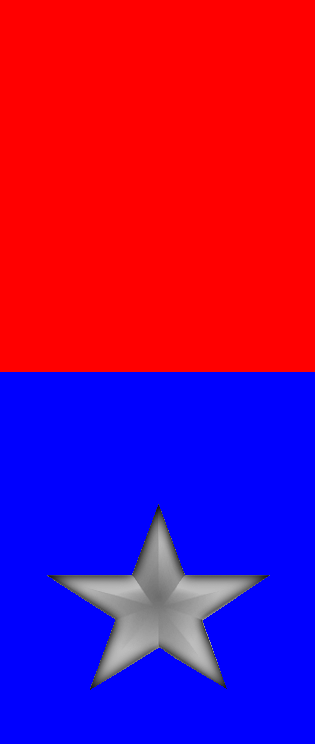
221st, 222nd Regiment "Ionio"

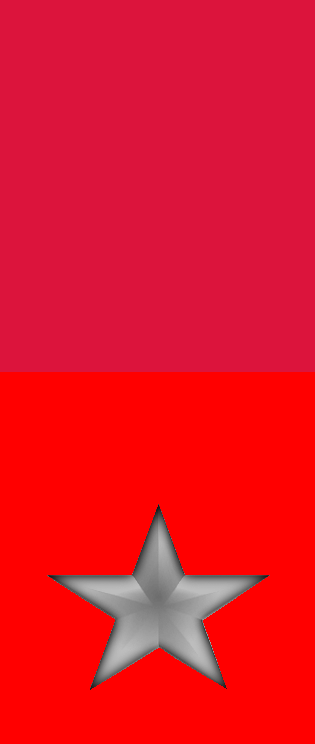
223rd, 224th Regiment "Etna"

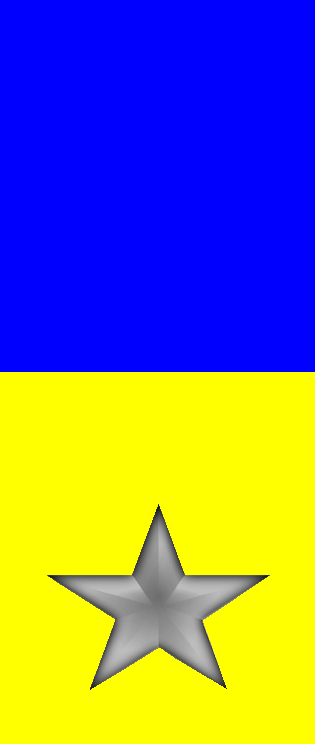
225th, 226th Regiment "Arezzo"

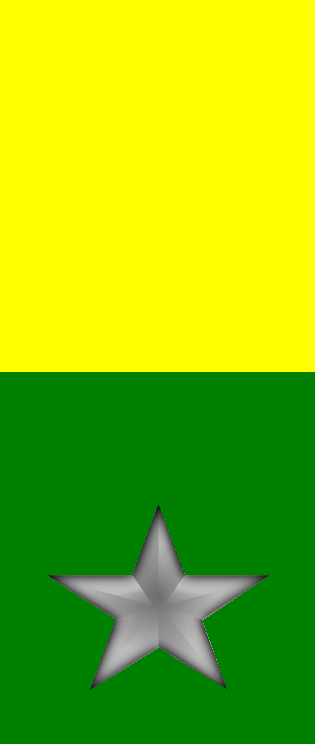
227th, 228th Regiment "Rovigo"

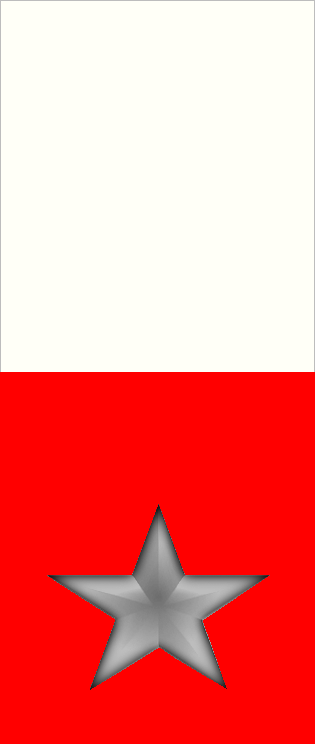
229th, 230th Regiment "Campobasso"

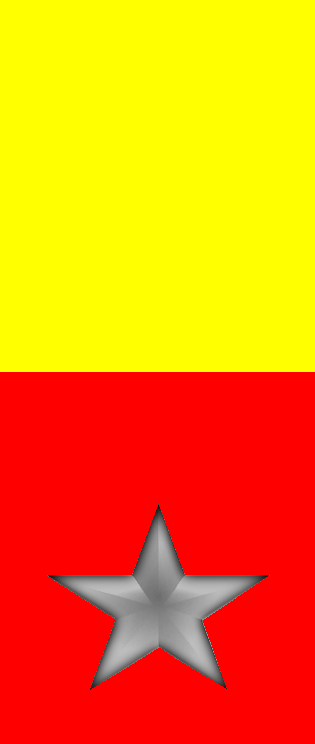
231st, 232nd, 331st Rgt. "Avellino" ("Brennero")

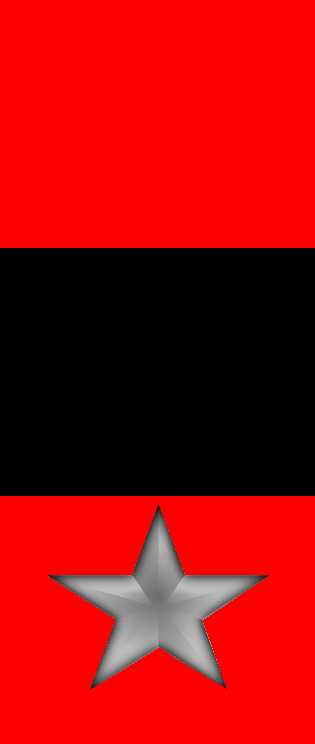
233rd, 234th Regiment "Lario"

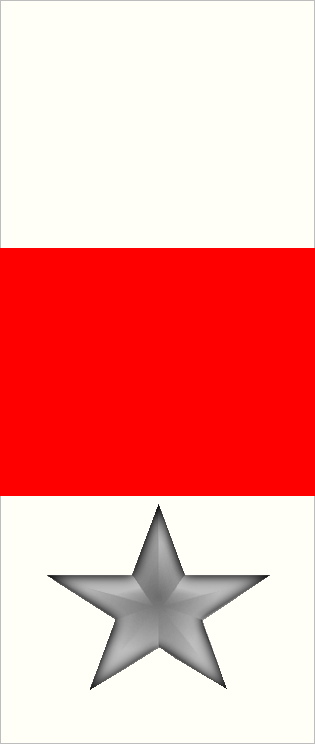
[235th], 236th, 336th Regiment "Piceno"

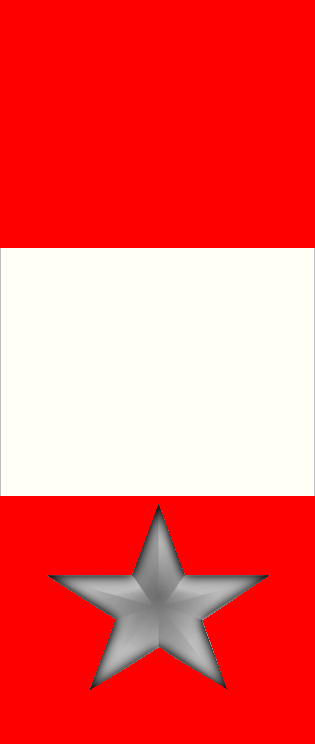
237th, 238th Regiment "Grosseto"

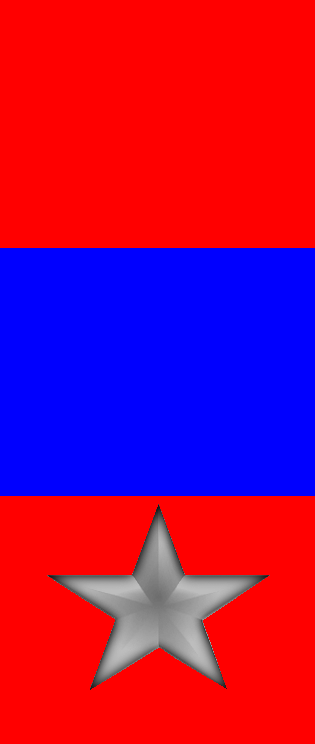
239th, 240th Regiment "Pesaro"

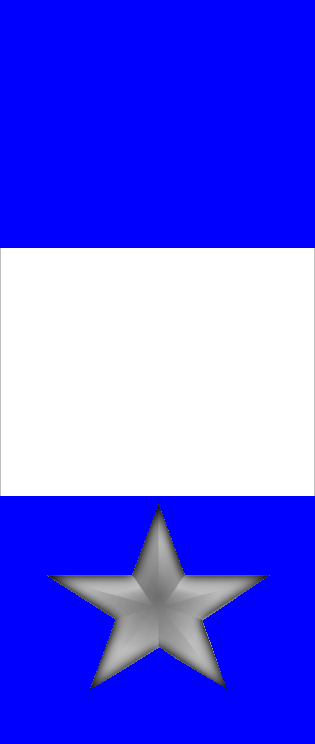
241st, 242nd Regiment "Teramo"

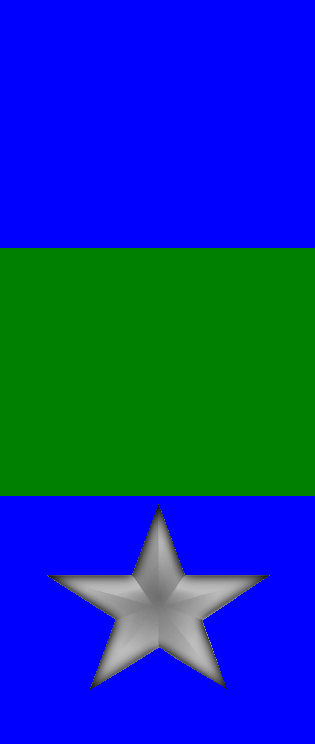
243rd, 244th Regiment "Cosenza"

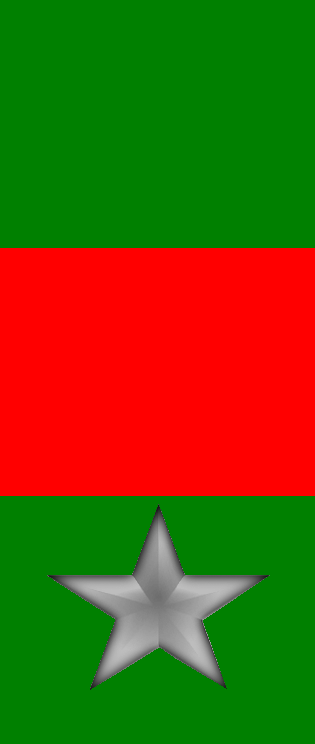
245th, 246th Regiment "Siracusa"

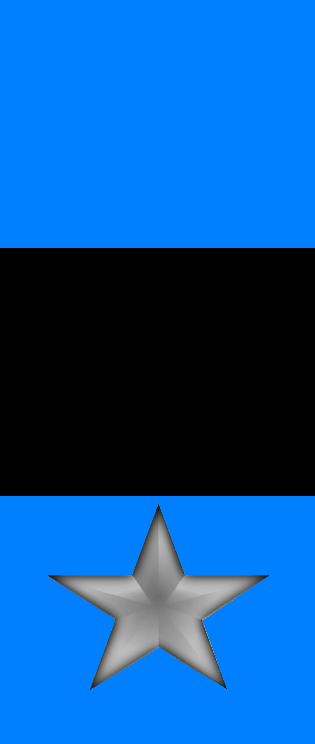
247th, 248th Regiment "Girgenti"

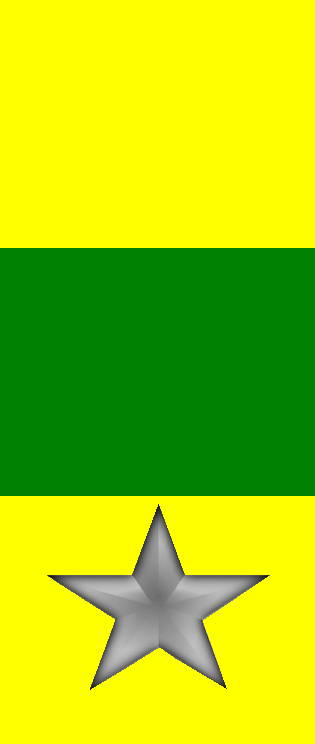
249th, 250th Regiment "Pallanza"

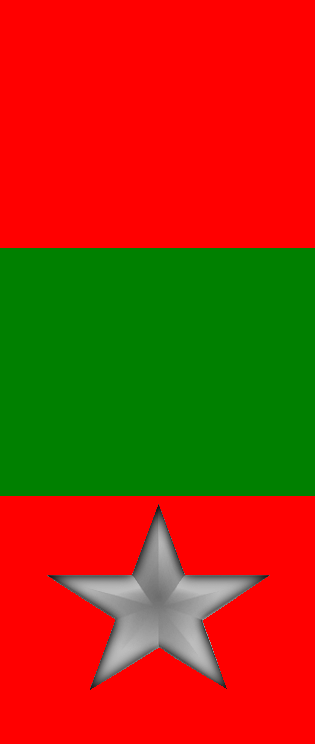
251st, 252nd Rgt. "Massa Carrara"

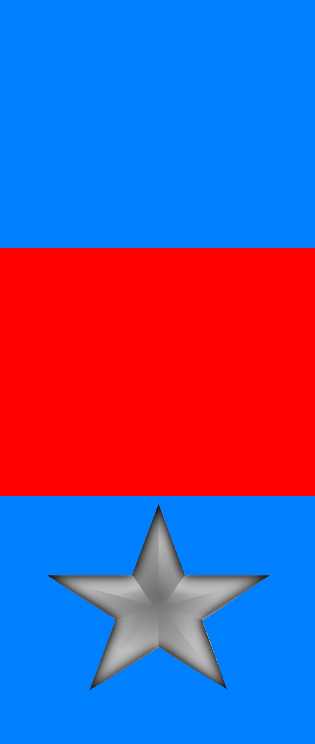
253rd, 254th Rgt. "Porto Maurizio"

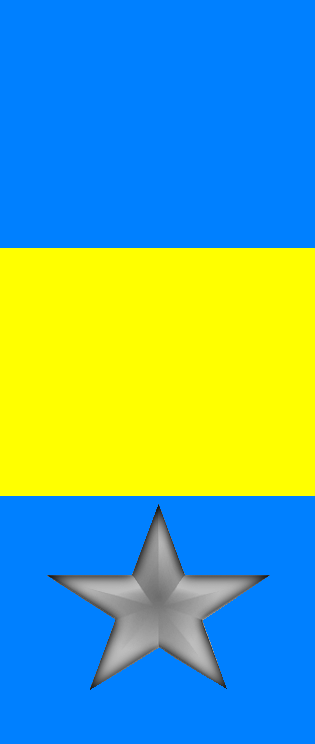
255th, 256th Regiment "Veneto"

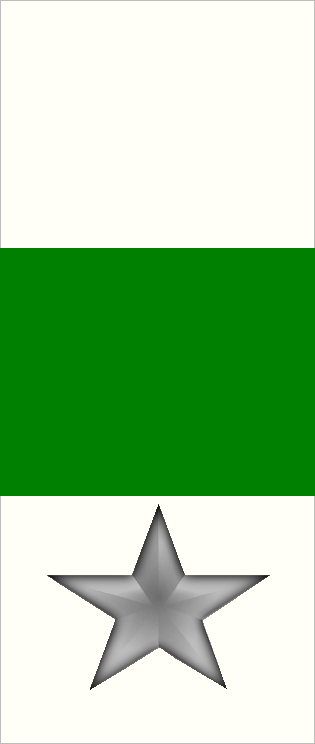
257th, 258th Regiment "Tortona"

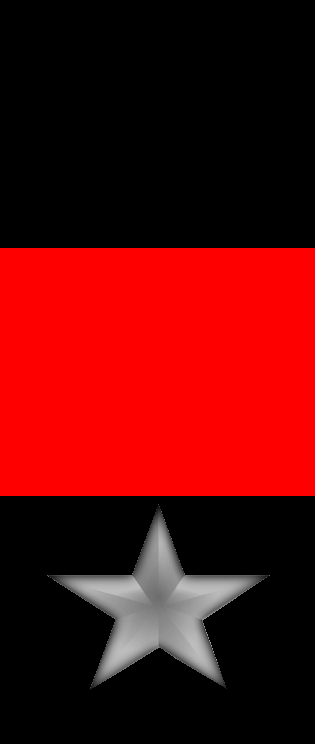
259th, 260th Regiment "Murge"

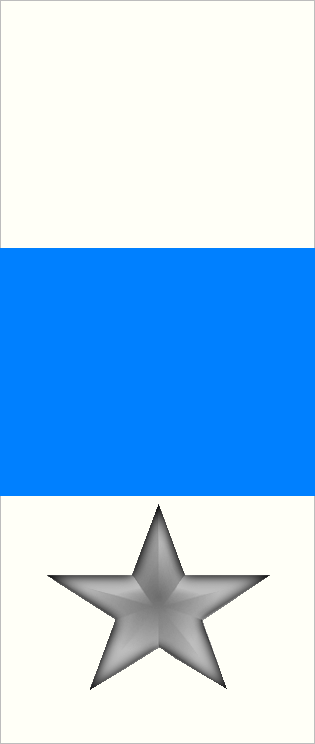
261st, 262nd Regiment "Elba"

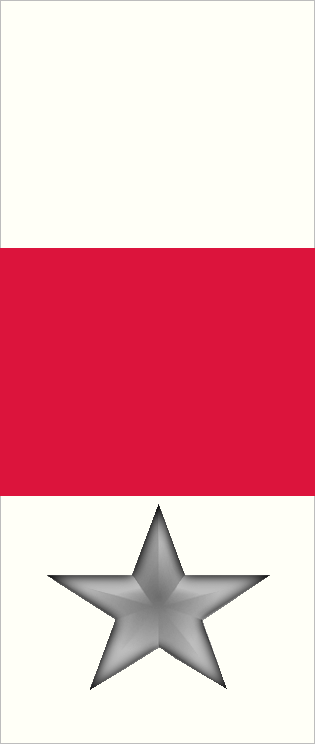
263rd, 264th Regiment "Gaeta"

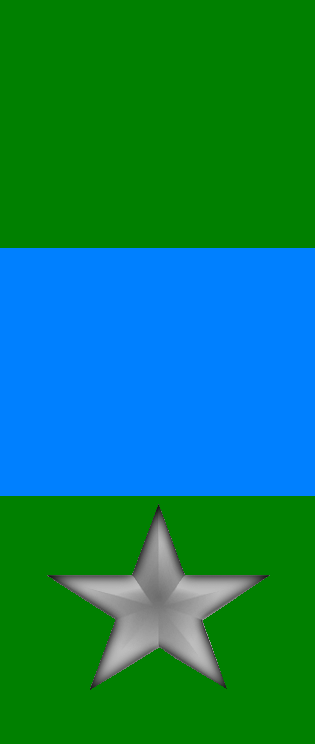
265th, 266th Regiment "Lecce"

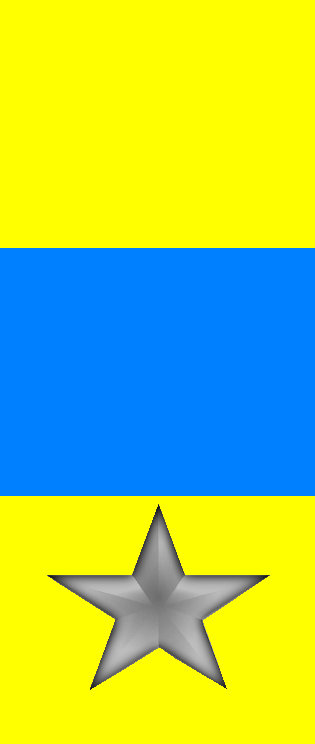
267th, 268th Regiment "Caserta"

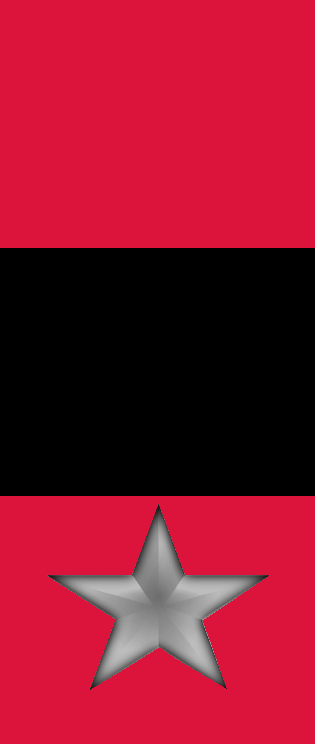
269th, 270th Regiment "Aquila"

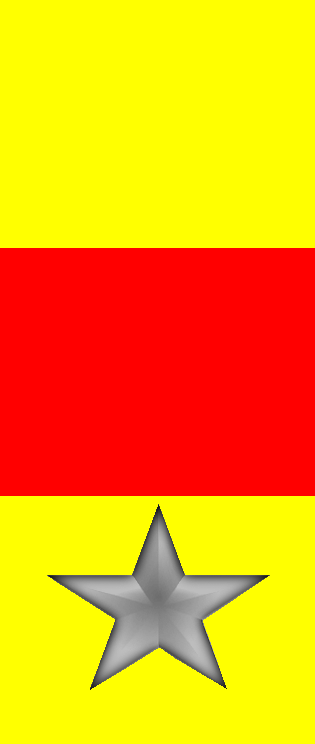
271st, 272nd, 273rd Regiment "Potenza"

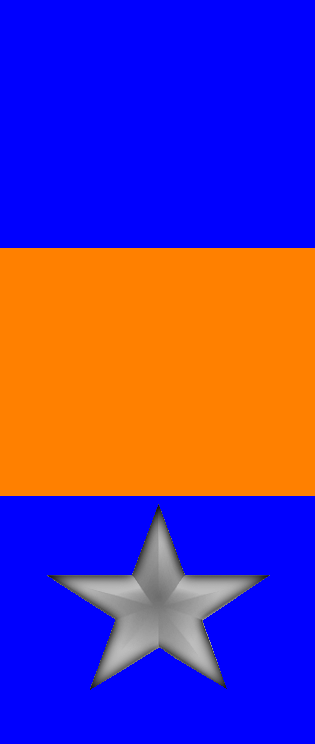
274th, 275th, 276th Regiment "Belluno"

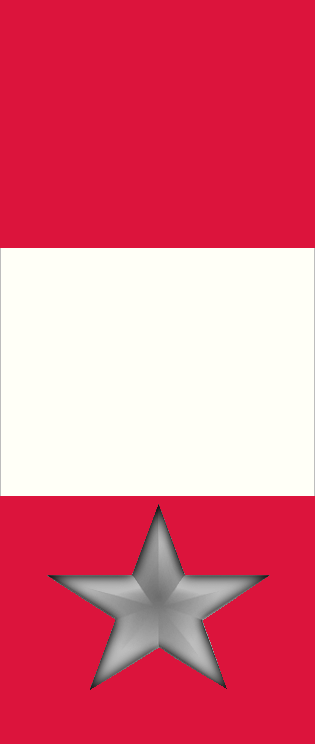
277th, 278th, 279th Regiment "Vicenza"

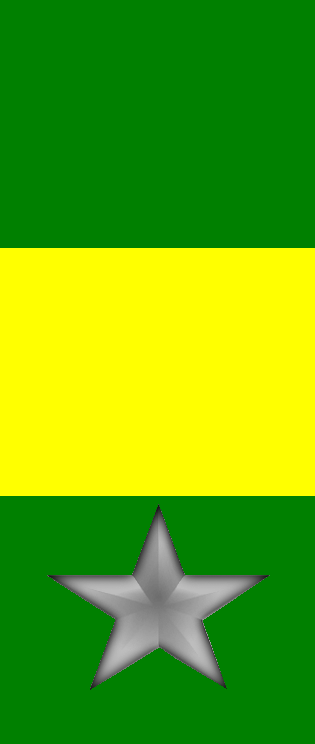
280th, 281st, 282nd Regiment "Foggia"

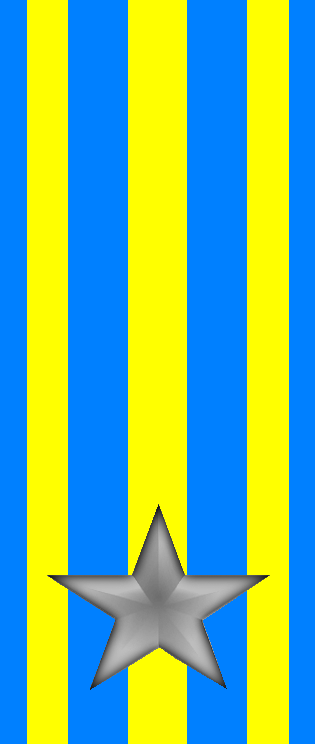
291st, 292nd Regiment "Zara"

== Cavalry ==
The Cavalry (Italian: Arma di Cavalleria) is divided since 1 June 1999 in two specialities: line cavalry and tankers (= personnel of tank regiments). On 1 June 1999 the three traditional cavalry specialities Dragoni (Dragoons), Lancieri (Lancers) and Cavalleggeri (Chevau-léger) were united in the new speciality "Line cavalry". On the same date the tankers speciality was transferred from the infantry to the cavalry.

Line cavalry personnel wear regiment-affiliated colored gorget patches with three points. Personnel of the cavalry that is not assigned to a regiment wear an orange gorget patch with three points. Tankers, whose speciality was founded as part of the infantry, continue to wear a two-pointed gorget patch, which has traditionally been the patch for infantry specialties. The tankers' gorget patch is red with two points in a light blue field.

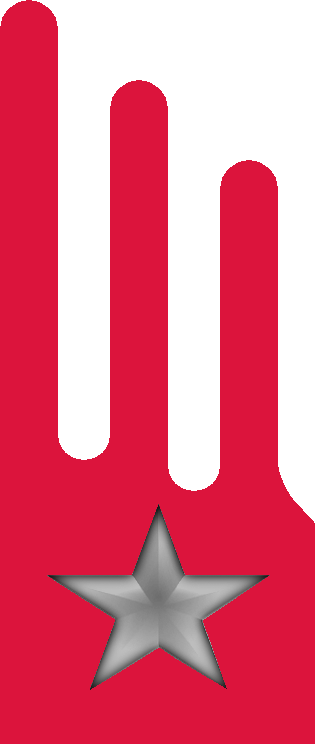
Regiment "Nizza Cavalleria" (1st)

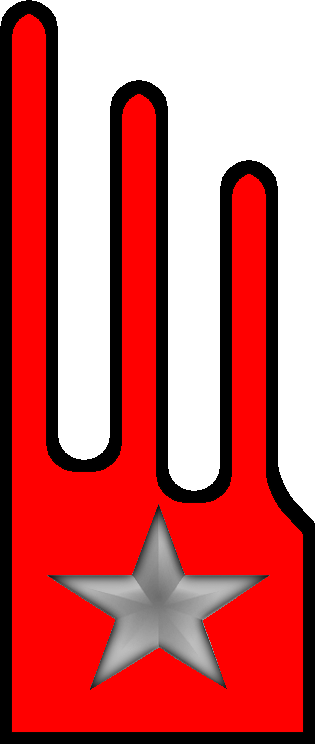
Regiment "Piemonte Cavalleria" (2nd)

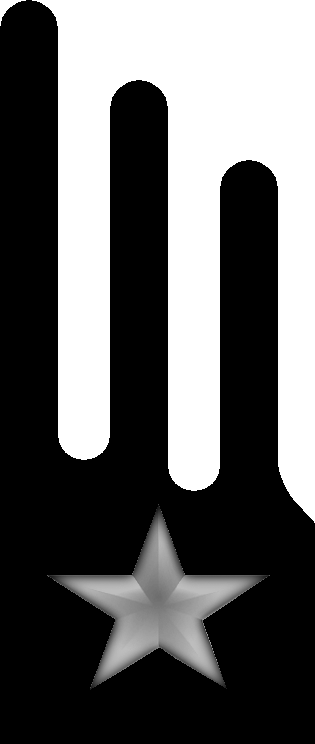
Regiment "Savoia Cavalleria" (3rd)

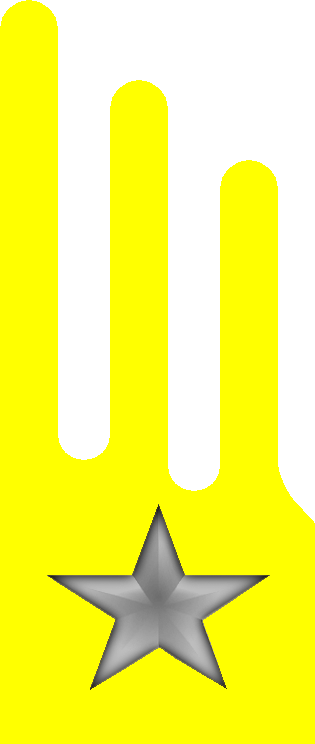
Regiment "Genova Cavalleria" (4th)

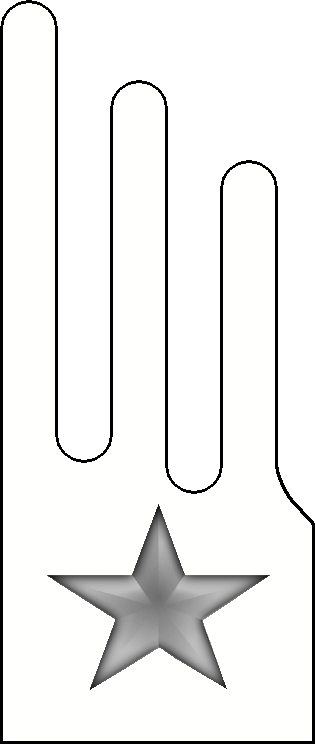
Regiment "Lancieri di Novara" (5th)

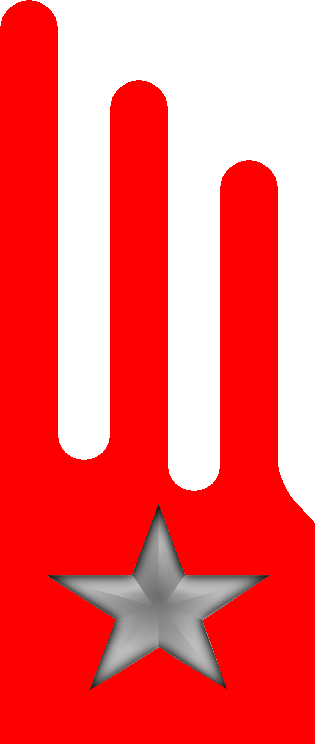
Regiment "Lancieri di Aosta" (6th)

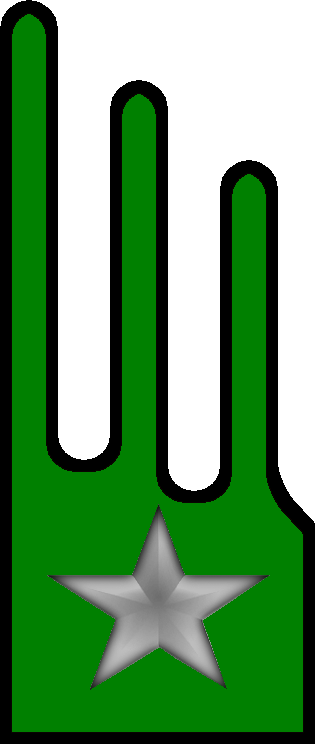
Regiment "Lancieri di Montebello" (8th)

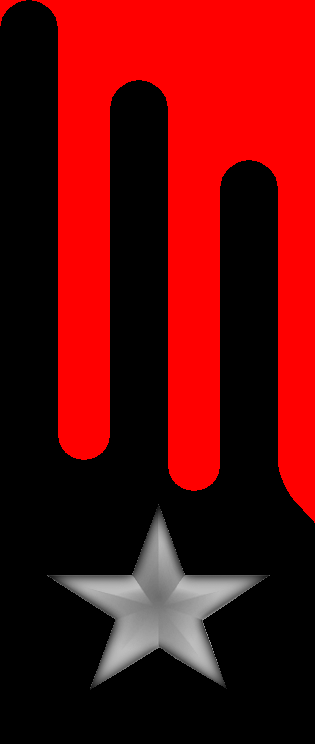
Regiment "Cavalleggeri di Lodi" (15th)

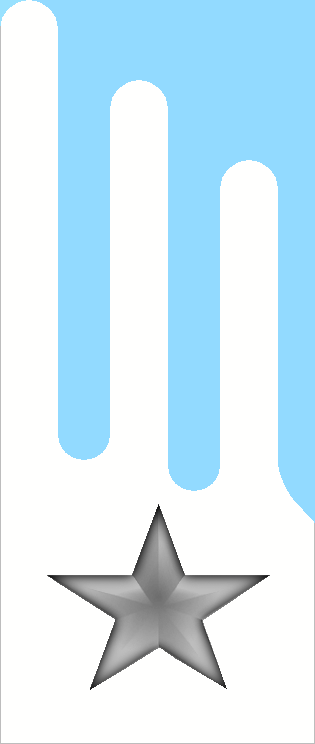
Regiment "Cavalleggeri Guide" (19th)

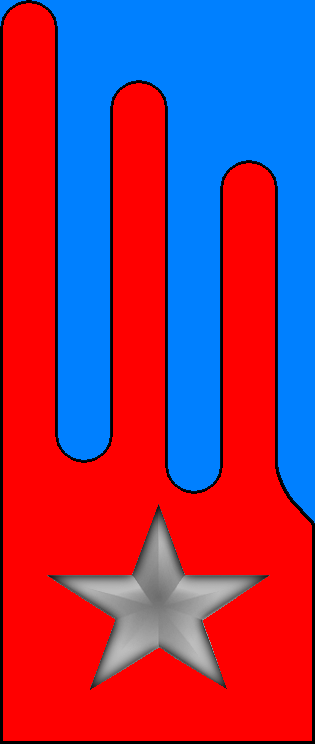
Regiment "Cavalleggeri di Treviso" (28th)

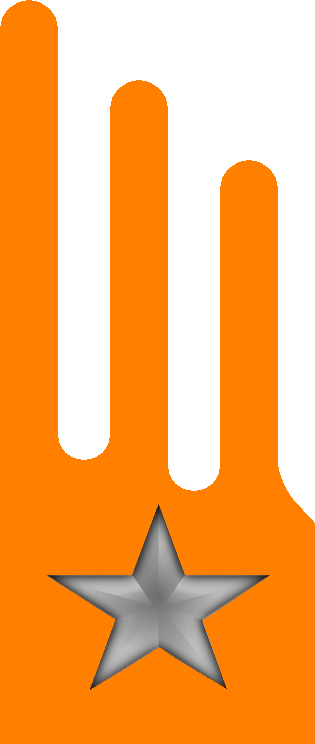
Unassigned cavalry personnel

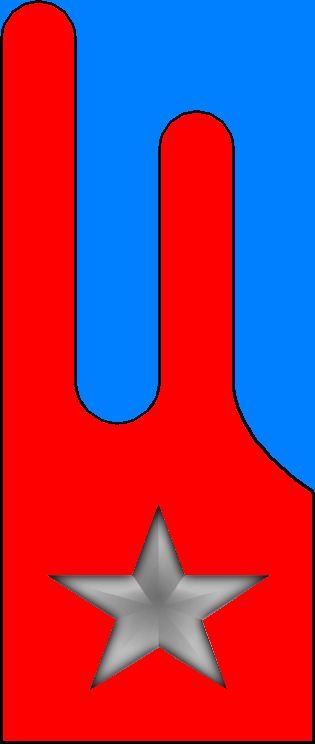
Tank units

=== Disbanded cavalry regiments ===
The gorget patches of disbanded regiments are an integral part of each regiment's traditions and insignia. In case one of the regiments listed below is reformed, then the corresponding gorget patch will be issued to regiment's personnel.

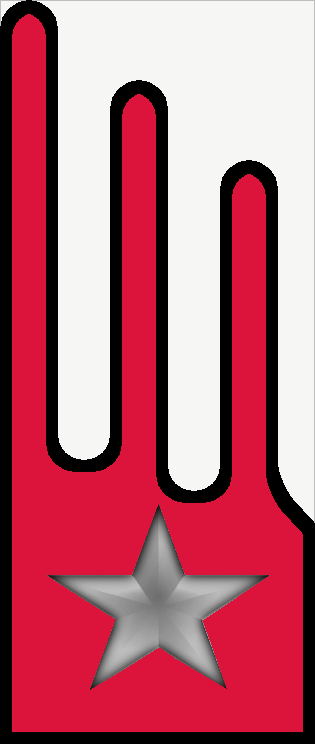
Regiment "Lancieri di Milano" (7th)

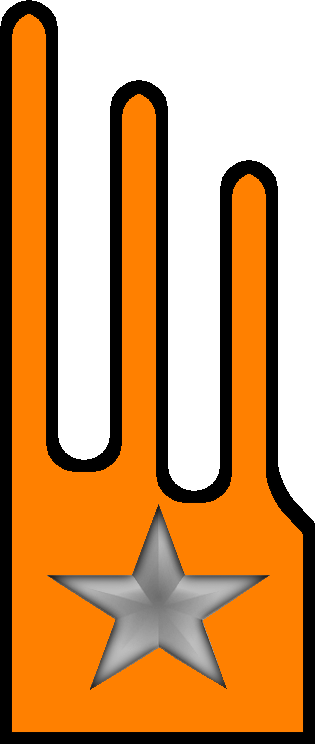
Regiment "Lancieri di Firenze" (9th)

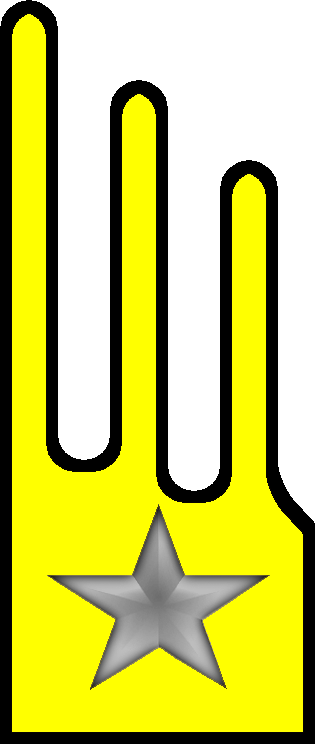
Regiment "Lancieri di Vittorio Emanuele" (10th)

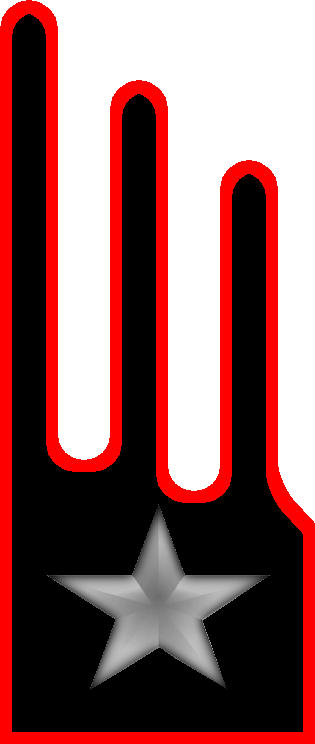
Regiment "Cavalleggeri di Foggia" (11th)

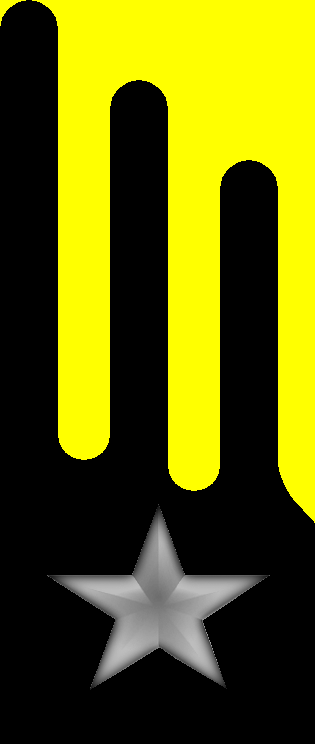
Regiment "Cavalleggeri di Saluzzo" (12th)

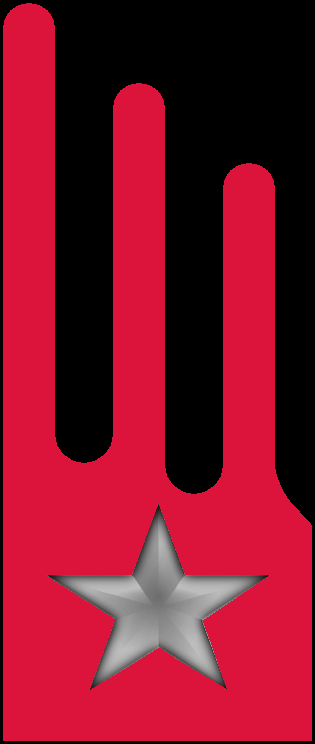
Regiment "Cavalleggeri di Monferrato" (13th)

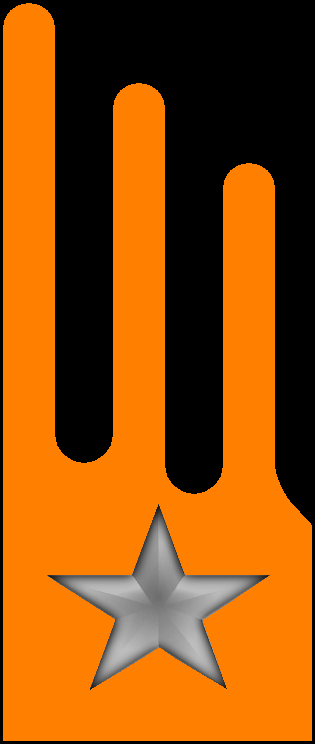
Regiment "Cavalleggeri di Alessandria" (14th)

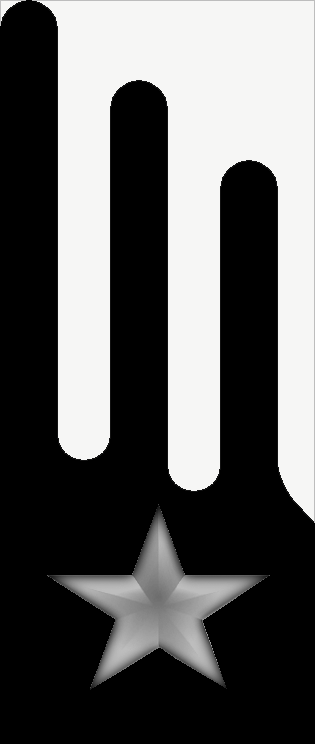
Regiment "Cavalleggeri di Lucca" (16th)

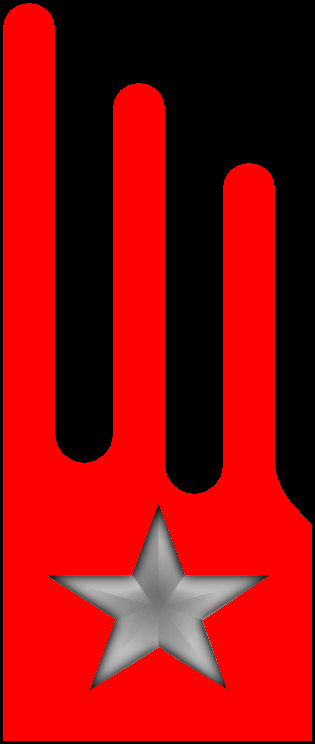
Regiment "Cavalleggeri di Caserta" (17th)

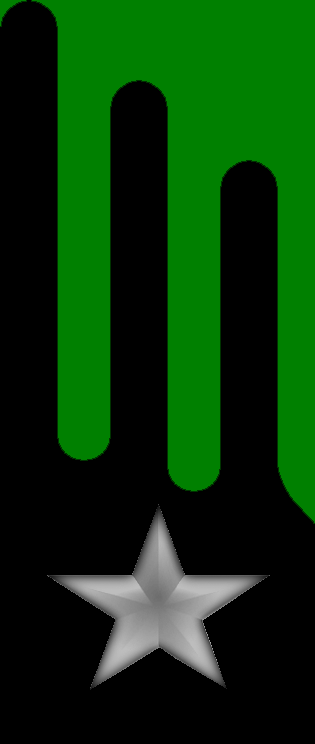
Regiment "Cavalleggeri di Piacenza" (18th)

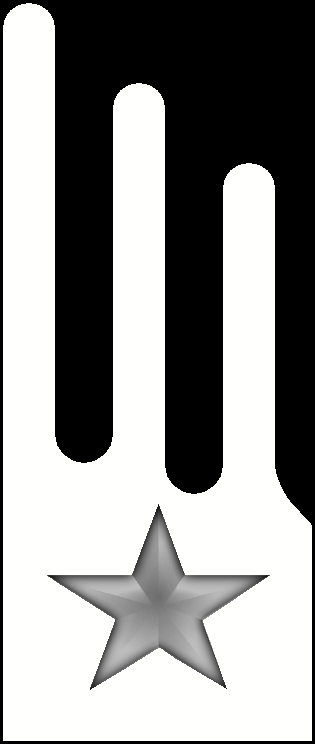
Regiment "Cavalleggeri di Roma" (20th)

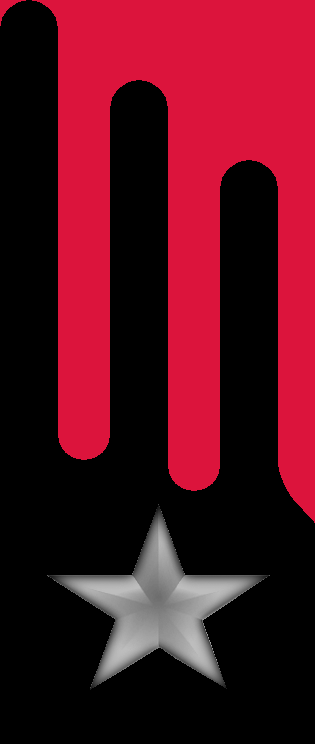
Regiment "Cavalleggeri di Padova" (21st)

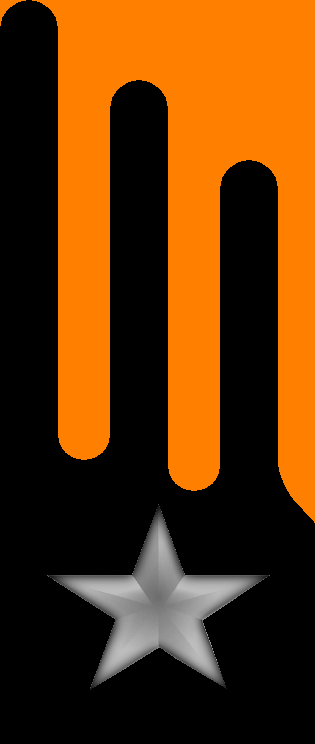
Regiment "Cavalleggeri di Catania" (22nd)

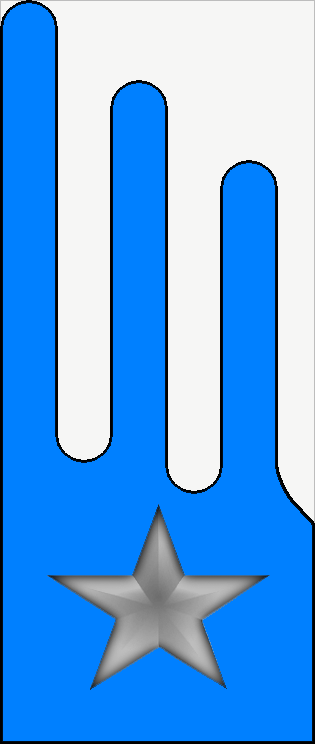
Regiment "Cavalleggeri di Umberto I" (23rd)

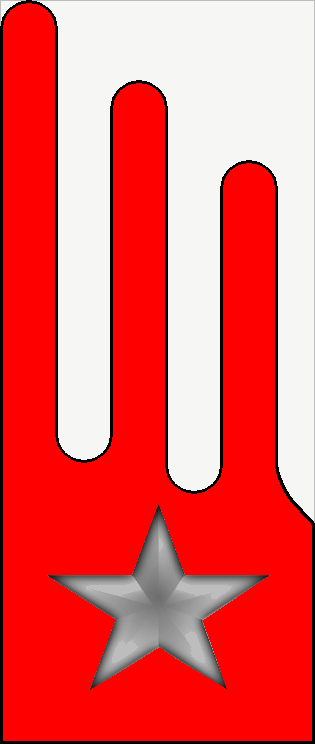
Regiment "Cavalleggeri di Vicenza" (24th)

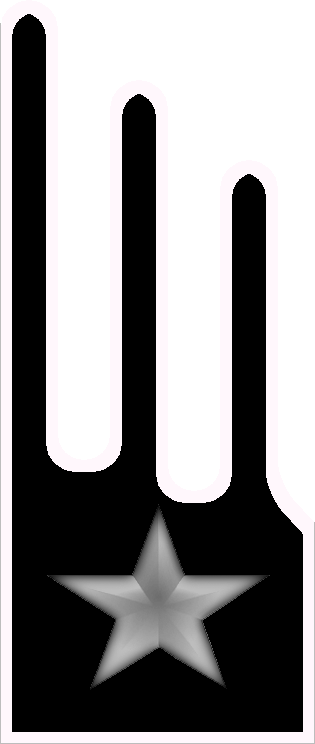
Regiment "Lancieri di Mantova" (25th)

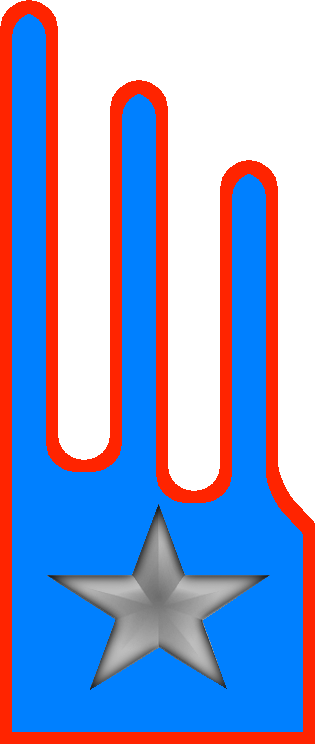
Regiment "Lancieri di Vercelli" (26th)

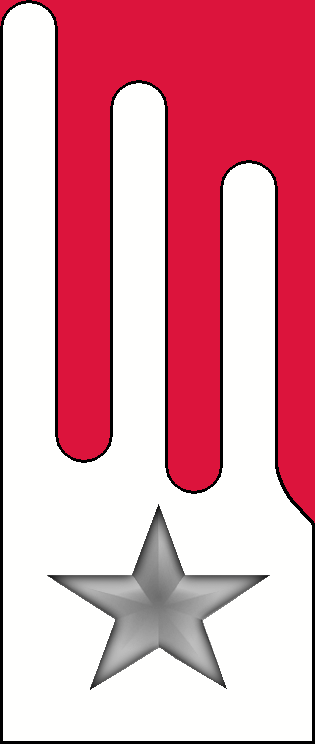
Regiment "Lancieri di Aquila" (27th)

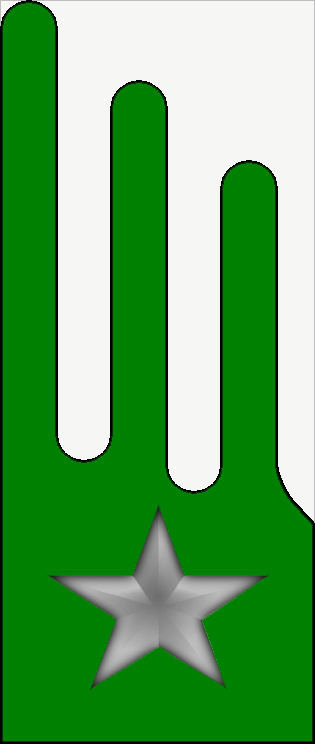
Regiment "Cavalleggeri di Udine" (29th)

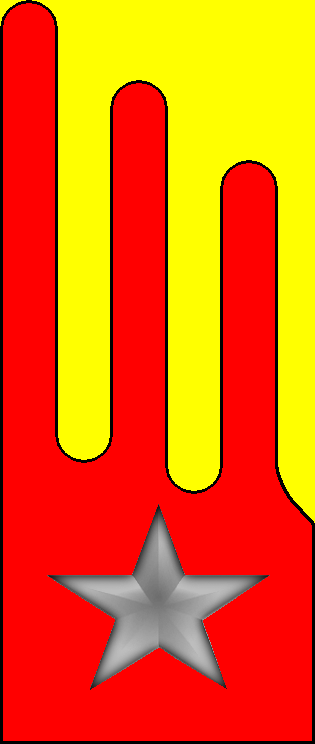
Regiment "Cavalleggeri di Palermo" (30th)

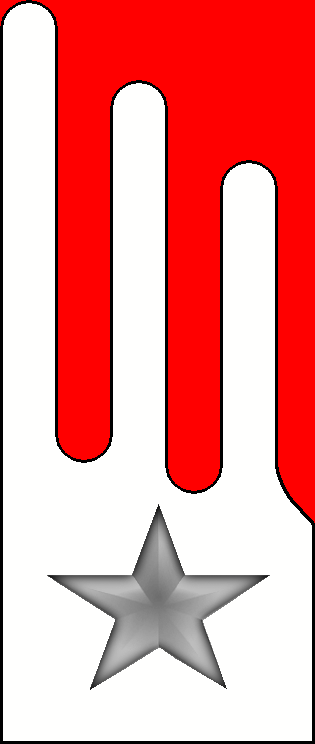
"Cavalleggeri di Sardegna"

== Artillery ==
Artillery (Italian: Arma di Artiglieria) personnel wear black gorget patches with one point and a yellow edge. Currently five variations and one speciality (Anti-aircraft artillery) are officially sanctioned.

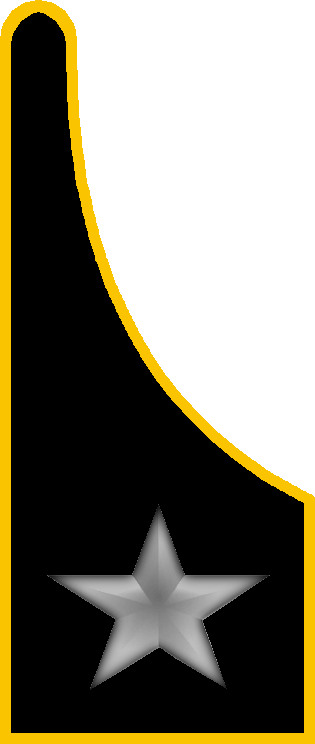
Artillery

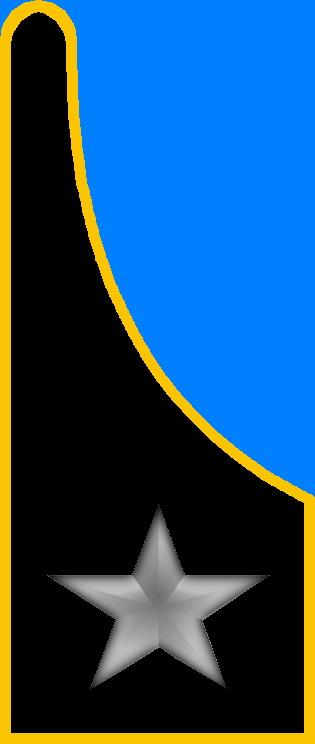
Self-propelled artillery

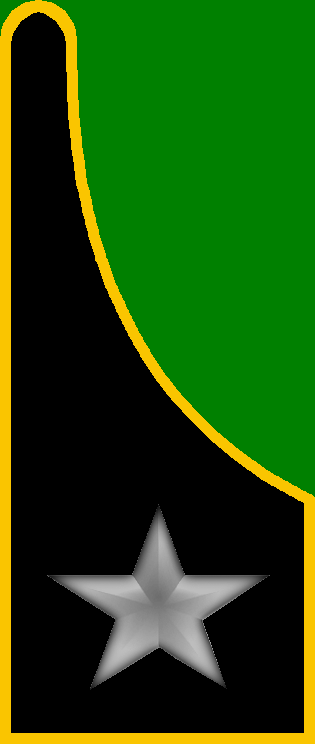
Mountain artillery

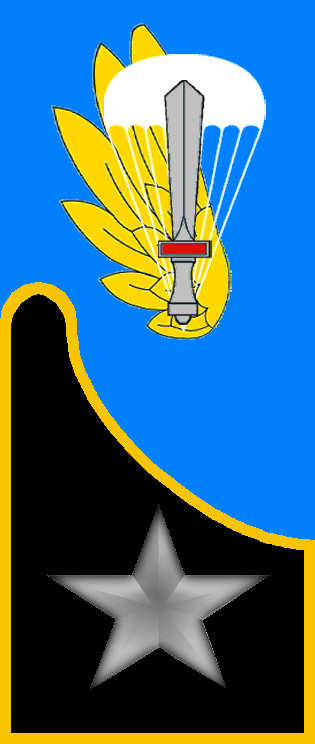
Airborne artillery

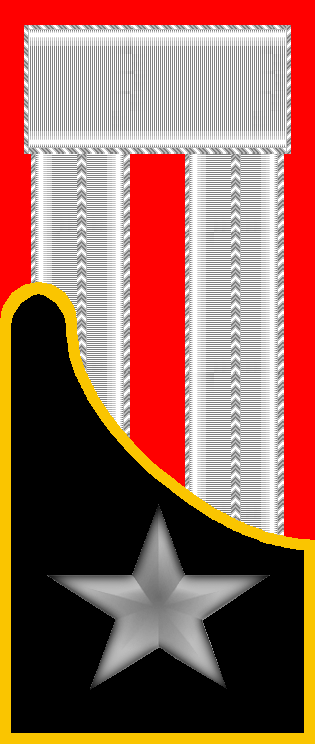
"Granatieri" brigade artillery^{Note}

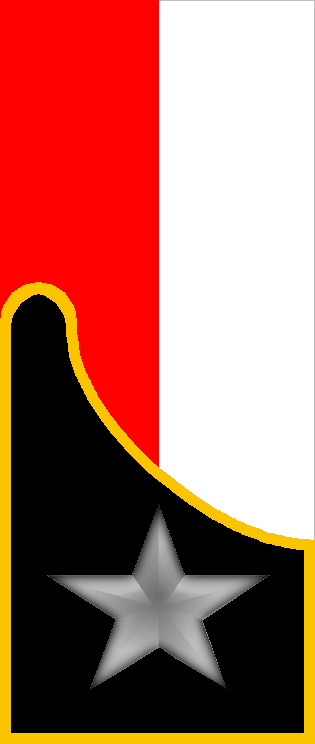
"Sassari" brigade artillery^{Note}

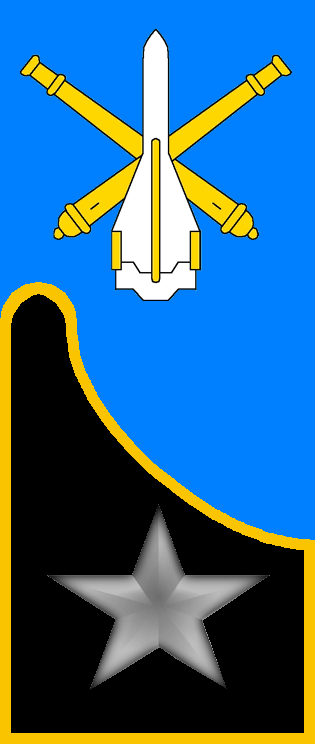
Anti-aircraft artillery

Note: As of 2020 no units wear these insignias.

== Engineer ==
Engineer (Italian: Arma del Genio) personnel wear black gorget patches with one point and a crimson edge. Currently one speciality (Sappers) and four variations thereof are officially sanctioned. The Sappers Speciality's gorget patch symbol is a black grenade from which a five-tongued red flame emerges, with a metallic gladius over flame and grenade. The other three specialities of the engineer—pioneers, bridge engineers, and railway engineers—wear the standard engineer gorget patch.

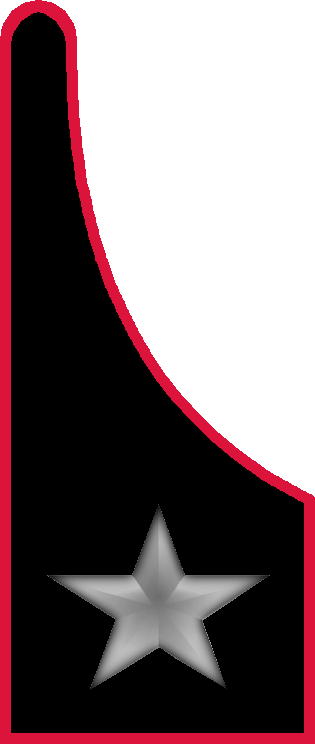
Engineers

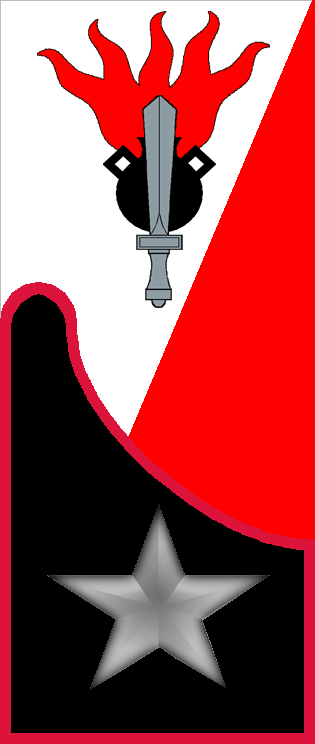
Sappers

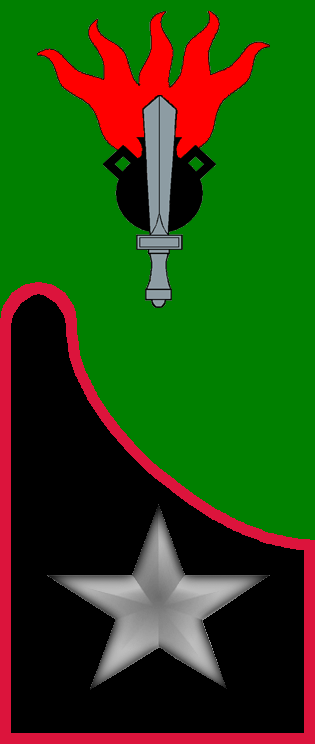
Alpine sappers

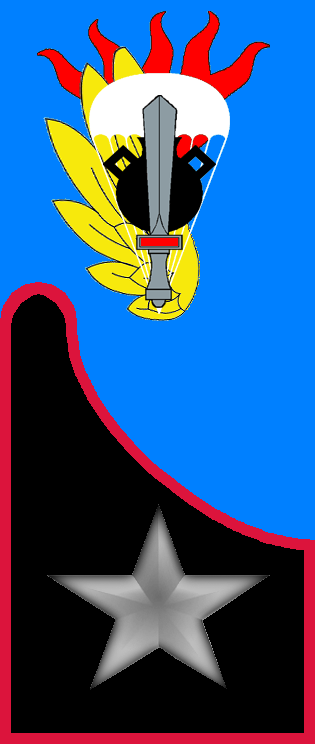
Airborne sappers

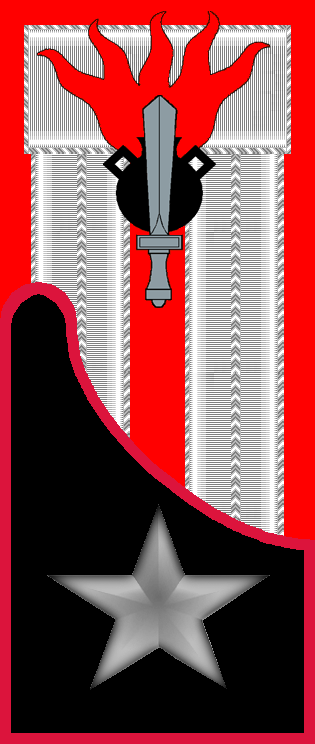
"Granatieri di Sardegna" sappers^{Note}

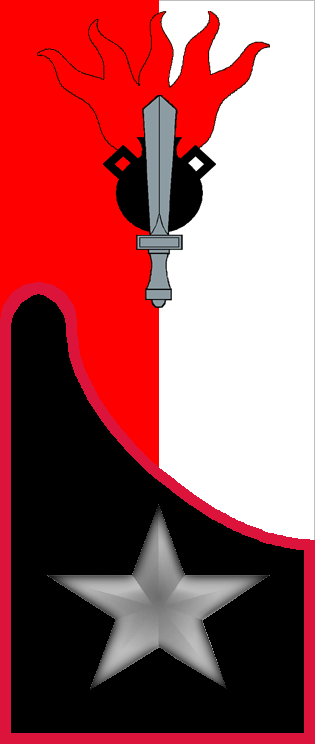
"Sassari" sappers

Note: As of 2020 no unit wears this insignia.

== Signals ==
Signal (Italian: Arma delle Trasmissioni) personnel wear electric blue gorget patches with two points and an amaranth edge. Currently four variations are officially sanctioned.

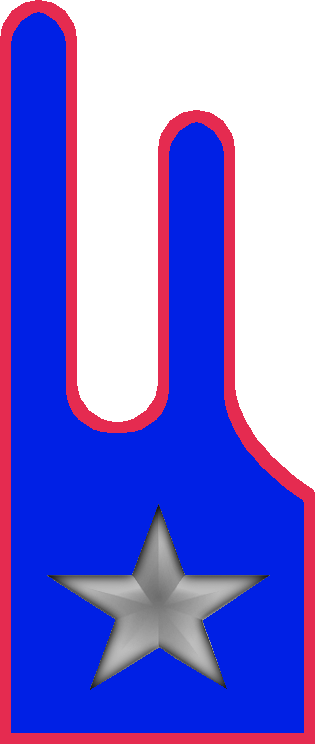
Signallers

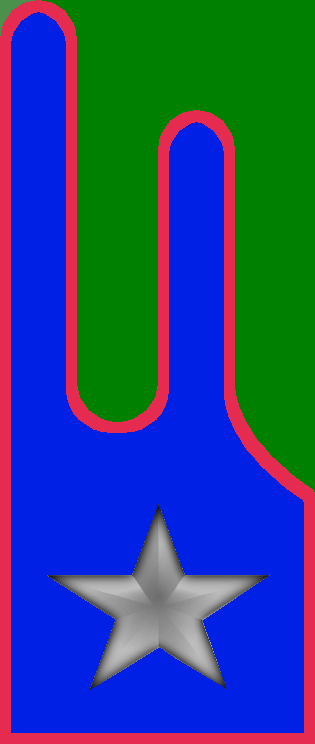
Alpine troops signallers

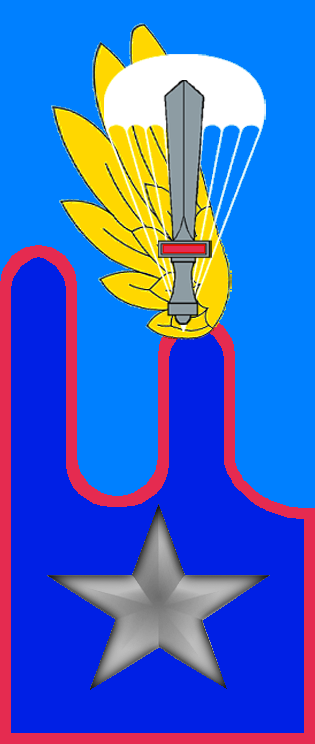
Airborne troops signallers

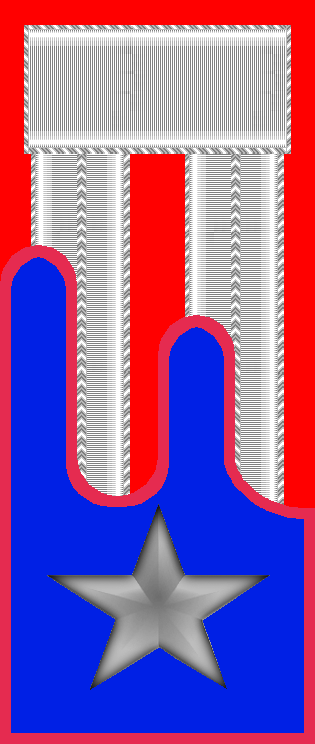
"Granatieri" brigade signallers

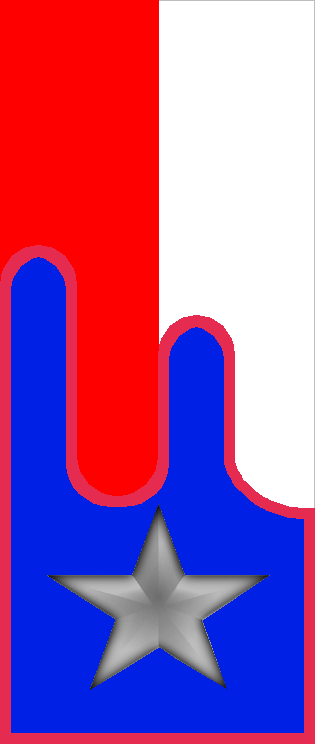
"Sassari" brigade signallers

== Transport and Material ==
Transport and Material (Italian: Arma dei Trasporti e Materiali - TRAMAT) personnel wear black gorget patches with two points on azure background. Currently four variations are officially sanctioned.

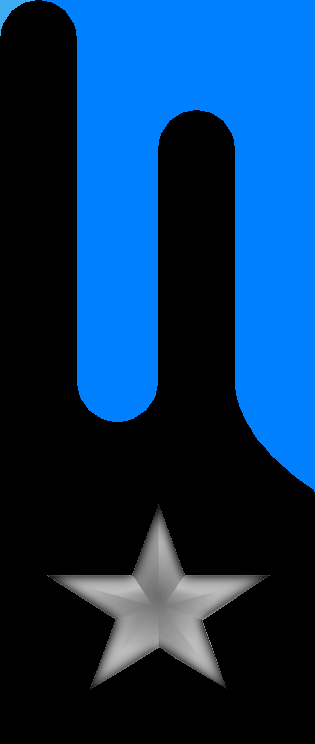
TRAMAT personnel

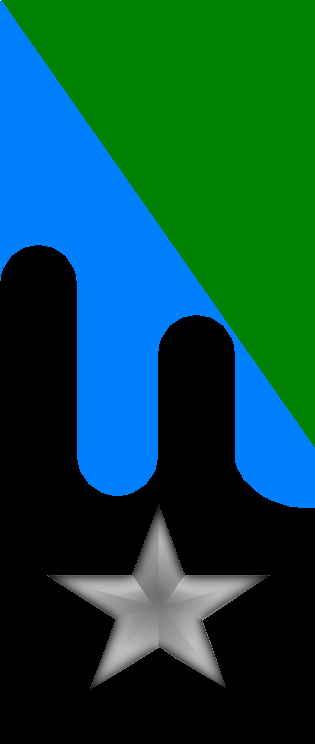
Alpine troops TRAMAT

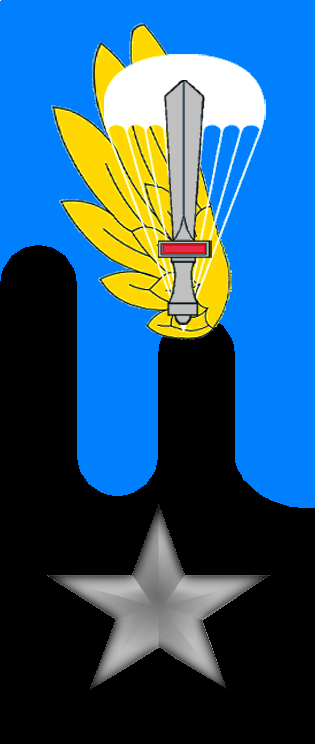
Airborne troops TRAMAT

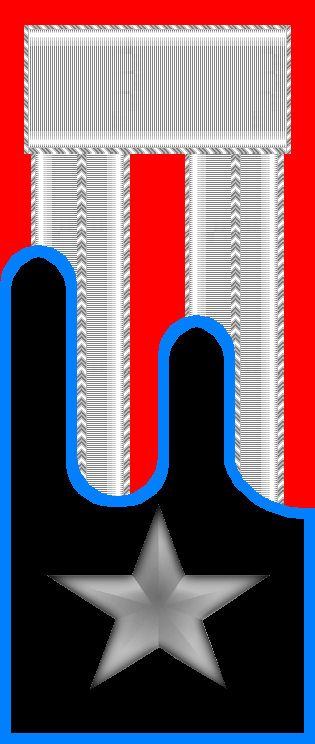
"Granatieri" brigade TRAMAT^{Note}

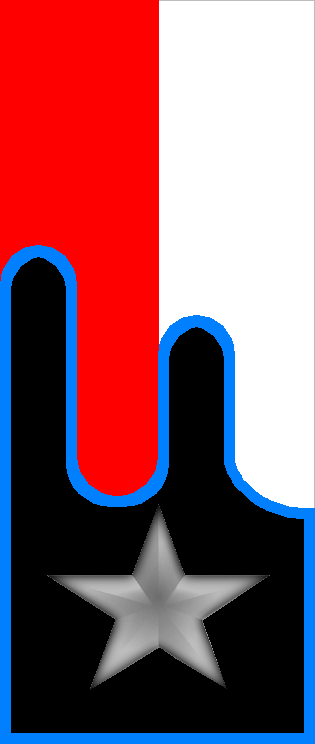
"Sassari" brigade TRAMAT

Note: As of 2020 no unit wears this insignia.

== Army Commissariat Corps ==
The Army Commissariat Corps (Italian: Corpo di Commissariato dell'Esercito) was formed on 1 January 1998 by the merger of the Army Commissariat Corps and the Army Administration Corps. Before the merger Commissariat Corps personnel wore violet gorget patches with one point, while Administration Corps personnel wore black gorget patches with one point and a sky blue edge. The personnel of the Commissariat Corps tasked with the role of food supplies wore sky blue gorget patches with one point. These three gorget patches were combined with the gorget patches of specialities of other arms and corps, resulting in dozens of variations. After the merger personnel wore black gorget patches with one point and a double-colored edge in violet and sky blue. This gorget patch was also combined with other gorget patches resulting in dozens of new variations. In 2003 the Commissariat Corps introduced a rectangular blue gorget patch with a golden laurel wreath, which is not combined with any other patch.

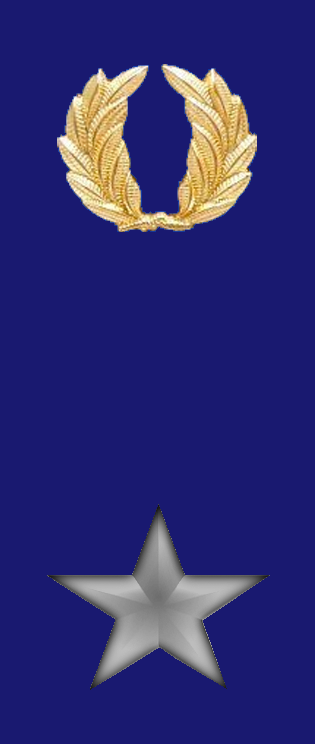
Commissariat Corps personnel

Examples of the disestablished Army Commissariat Corps and the Army Administration Corps gorget patches and their variations:

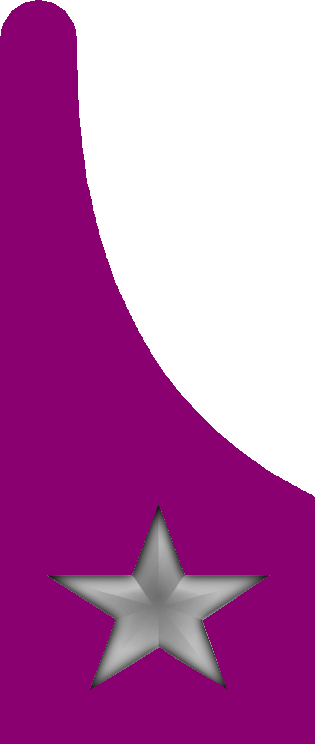
Commissariat personnel

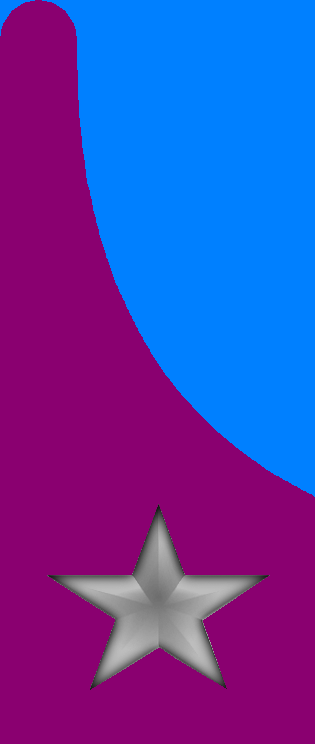
Armored troops commissariat personnel

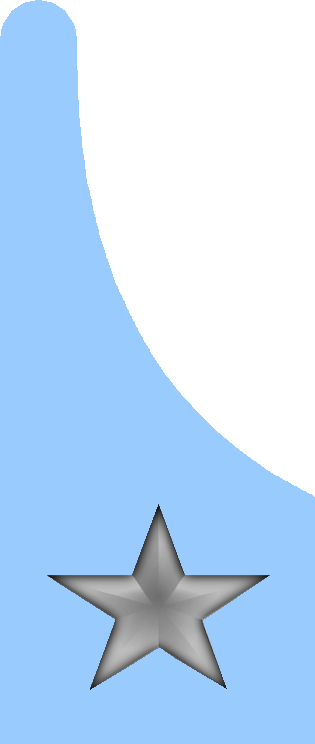
Supply role personnel

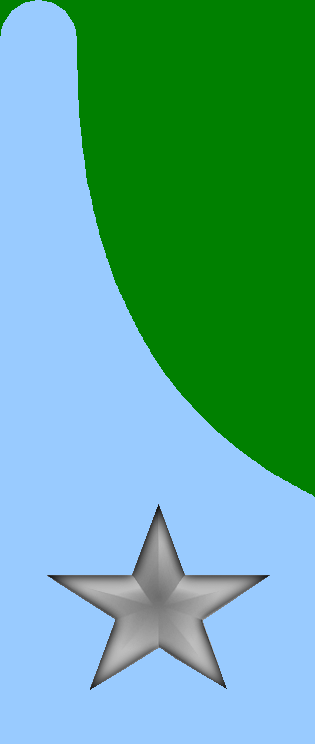
Alpine troops supply role personnel

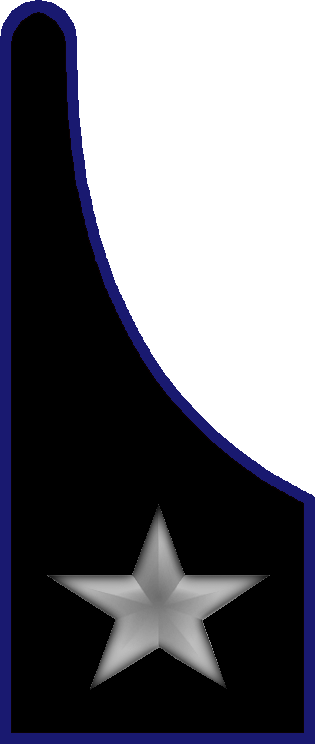
Administrative personnel

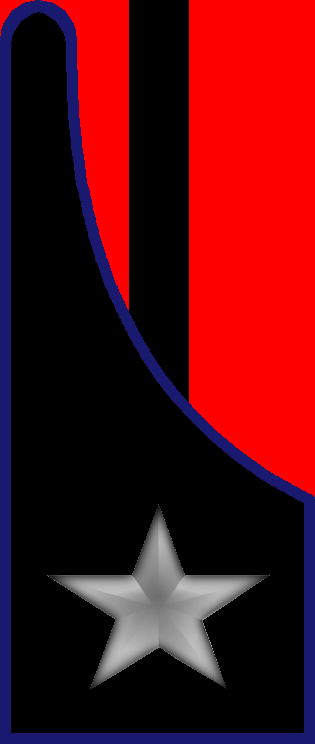
Infantry Division "Aosta" administrative personnel

== Army Health Corps ==
The Army Health Corps (Italian: Corpo Sanitario dell'Esercito) is the result of the merger of the Army Medical Corps and Army Veterinary Corps on 1 January 1998. The corps' personnel wears two different types of gorget patches: amaranth with one point for medical personnel, and sky blue with one point for veterinary personnel. The medical corps also distinguishes between medical officers and personnel. For each type of patch five variations are officially sanctioned. In 2009 the medical officers gorget patch was differentiated to include pharmacists, dentists, and psychologists.

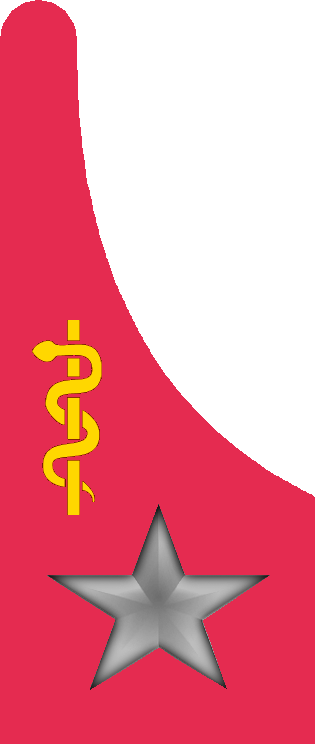
Medical officer

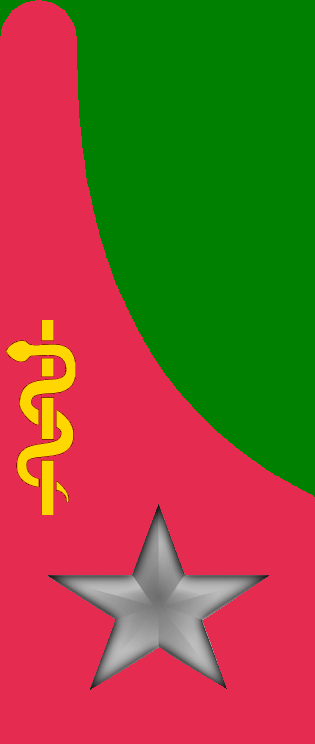
Alpine troops medical officer

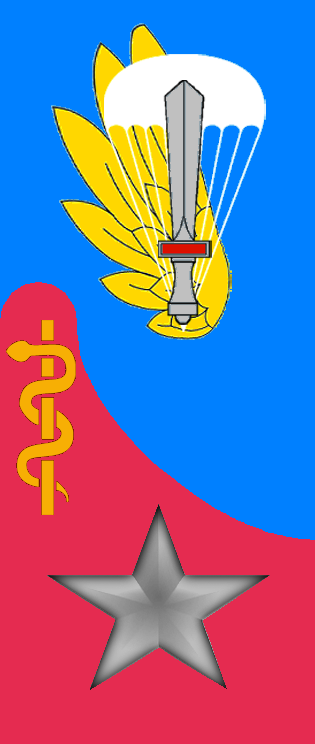
Airborne troops medical officer

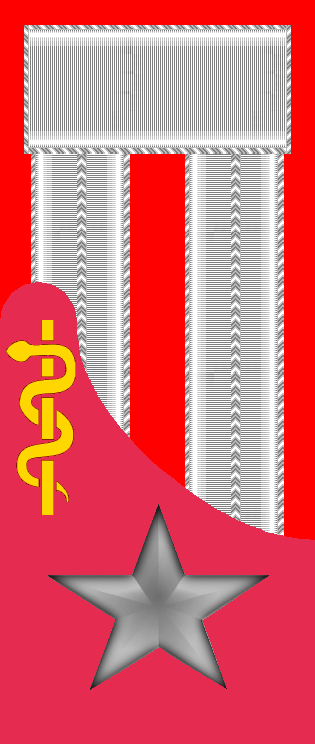
"Granatieri" brigade medical officer

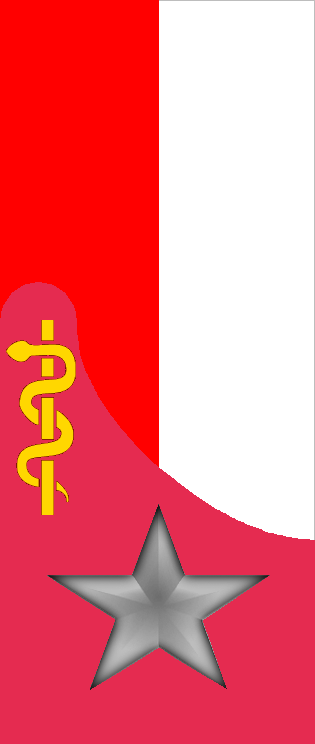
"Sassari" brigade medical officer

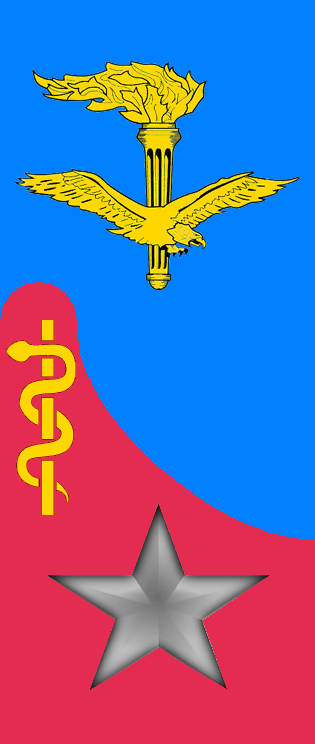
Army aviation medical officer

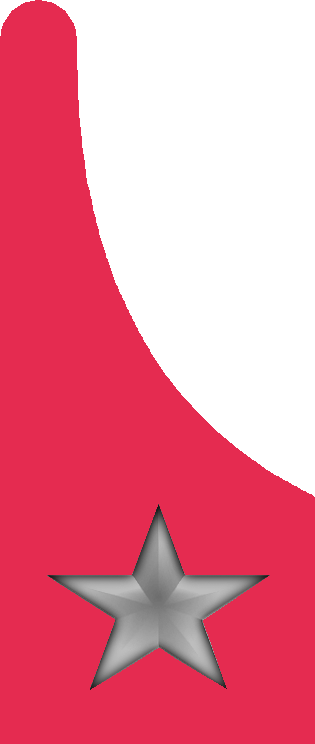
Medical personnel

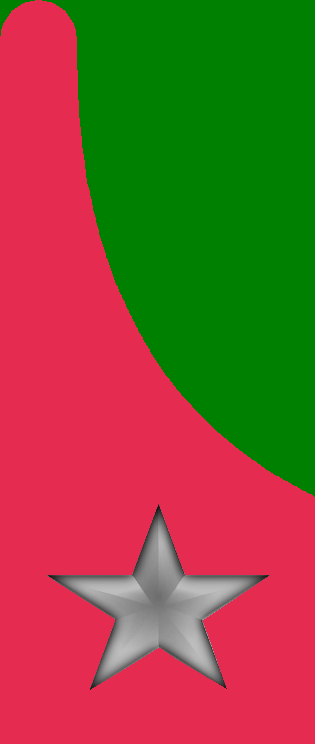
Alpine troops medical personnel

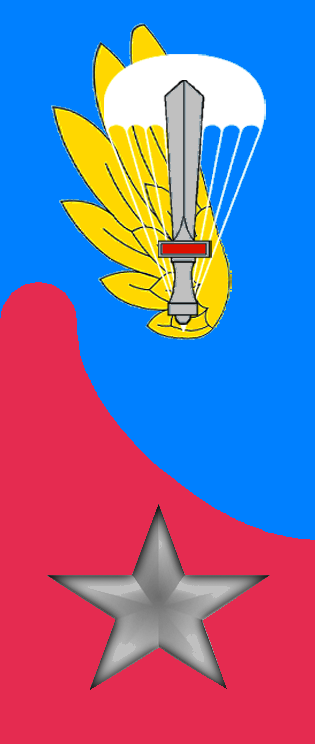
Airborne troops medical personnel

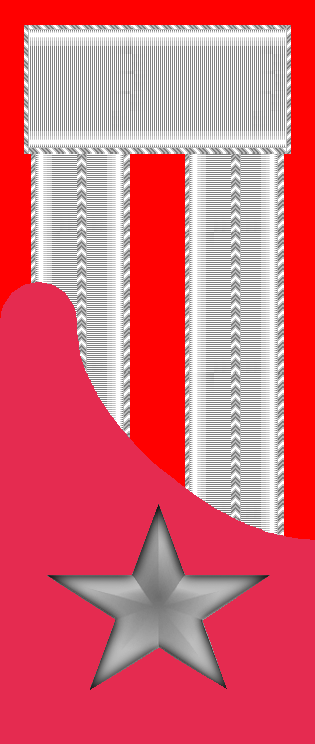
"Granatieri" brigade medical personnel

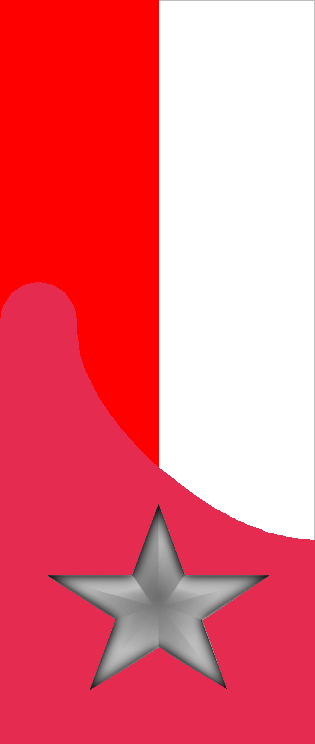
"Sassari" brigade medical personnel

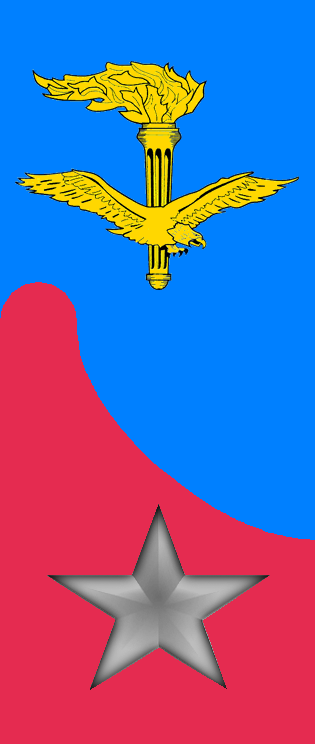
Army aviation medical personnel

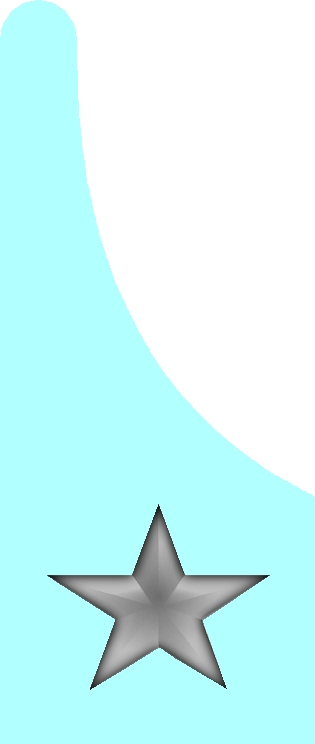
Veterinarian

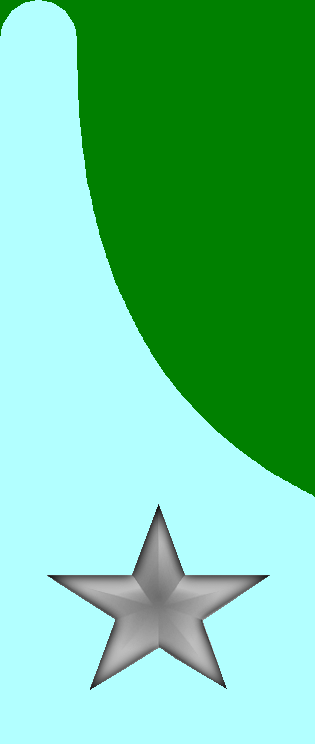
Alpine troops veterinarian

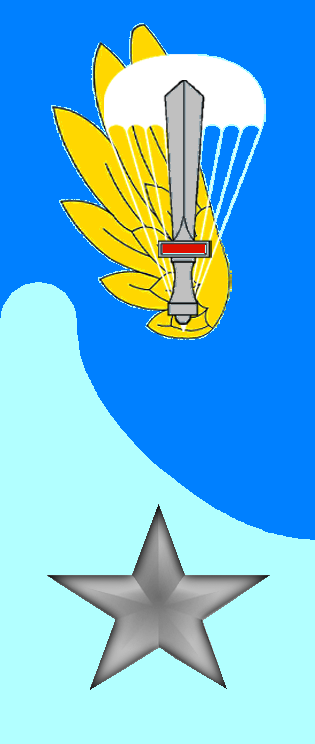
Airborne troops veterinarian

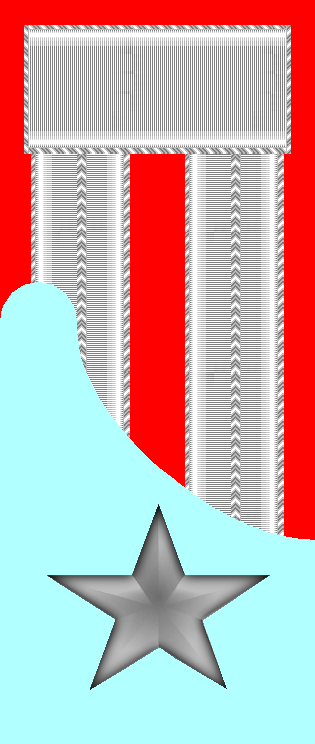
"Granatieri" brigade veterinarian

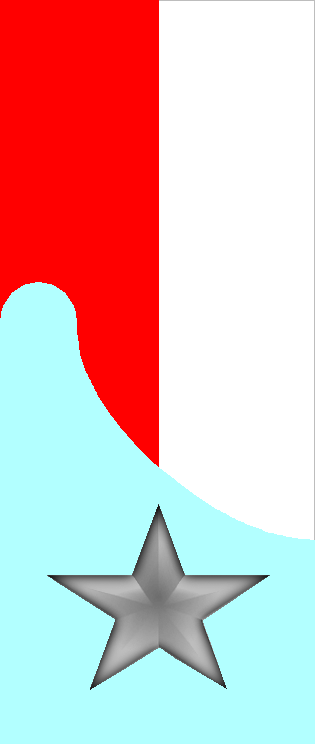
"Sassari" brigade veterinarian

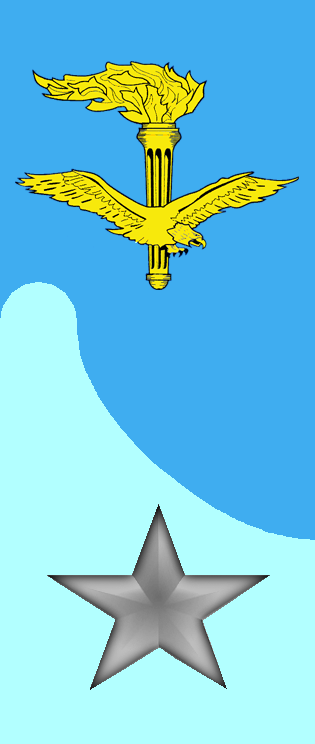
Army aviation veterinarian

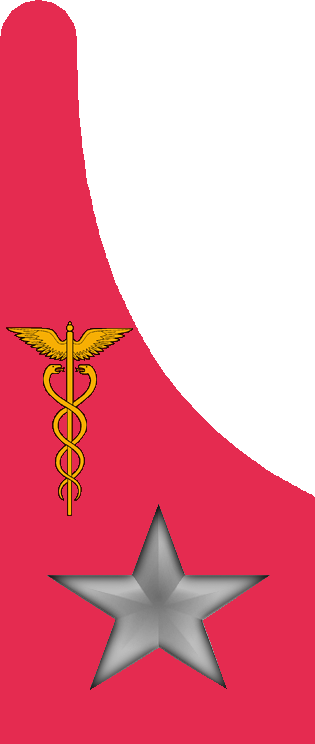
Pharmacist

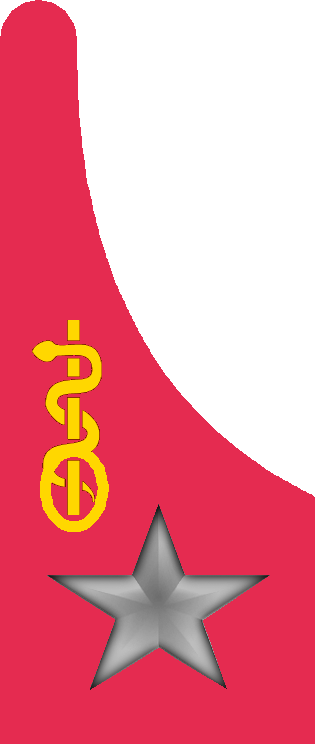
Dentist

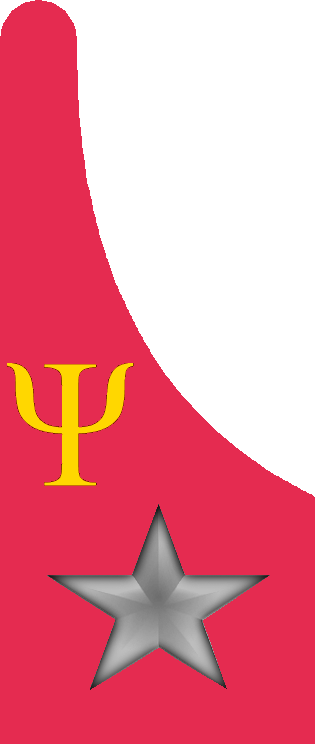
Psychologist

== Army Corps of Engineers ==
The Army Corps of Engineers (Italian: Corpo degli Ingegneri dell'Esercito) was formed on 9 October 1980 by unifying the army's technical services. The Army Corps of Engineers conducts technological research, tests and evaluates the army's acquisitions, and maintains and updates the army's geographic data. All members of the Army Corps of Engineers are officers and wear rectangular black gorget patches with a colored border and a profile of the head of Minerva facing inward.

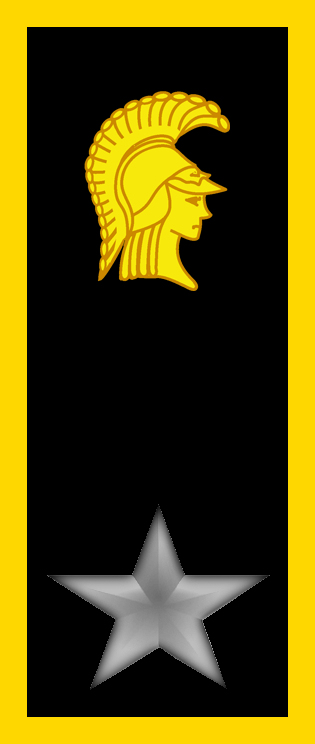
Armaments engineer

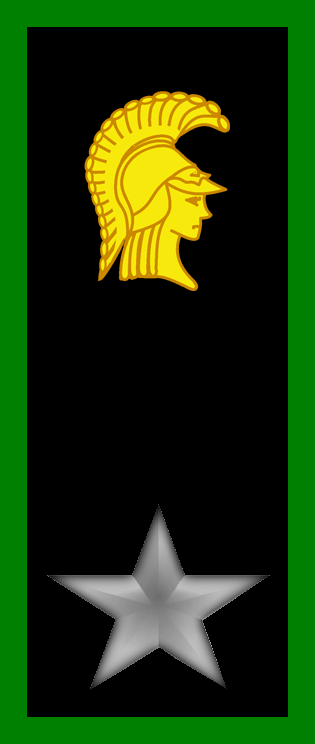
Geographer

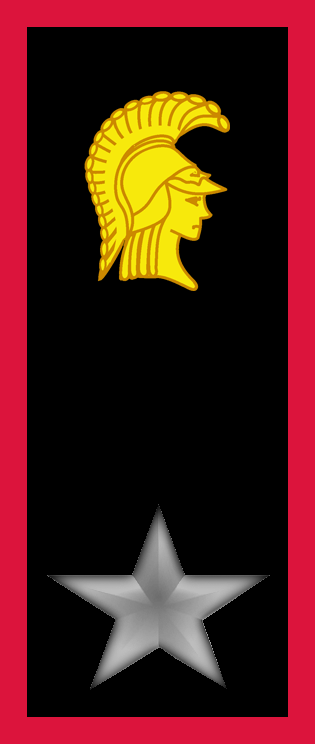
Infrastructure engineer

The army's technical services wore rectangular black gorget patches with a colored border.

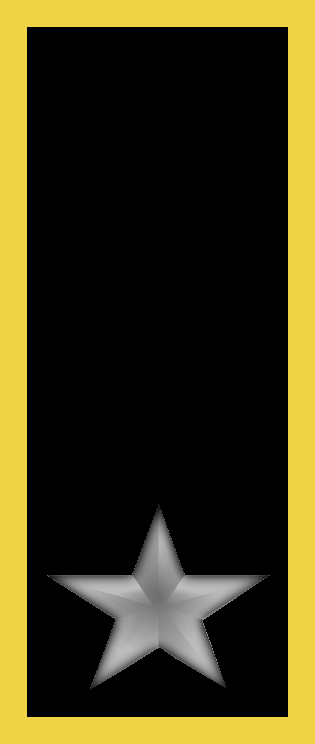
Artillery technical service

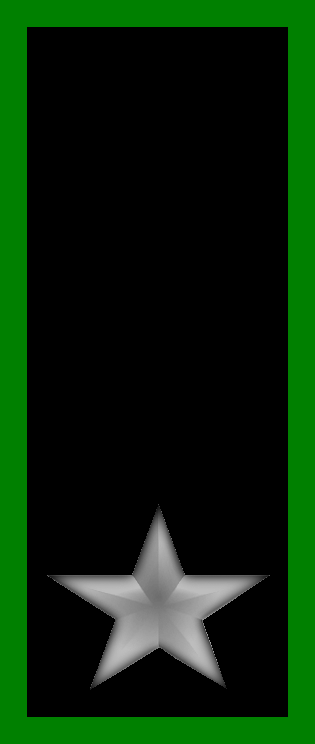
Geographic technical service

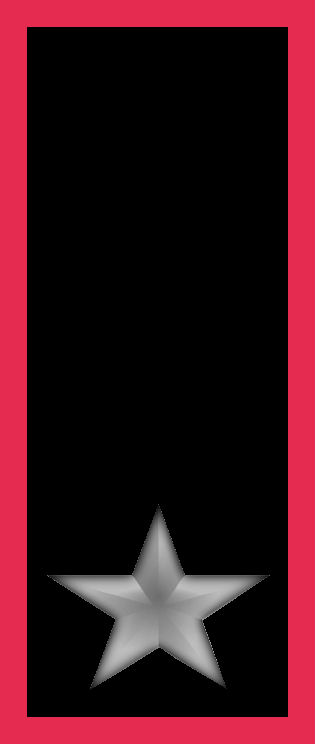
Chemical-physical technical service

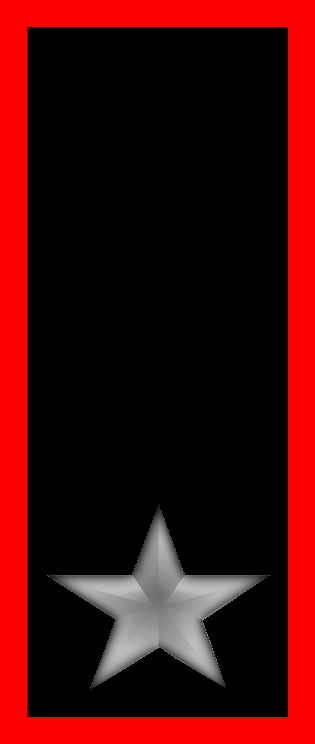
Engineering technical service

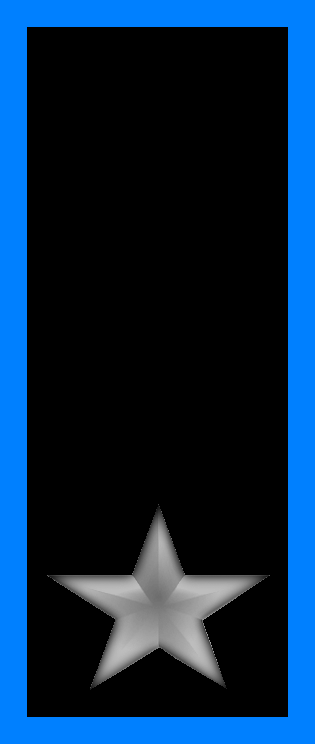
Motorization technical service

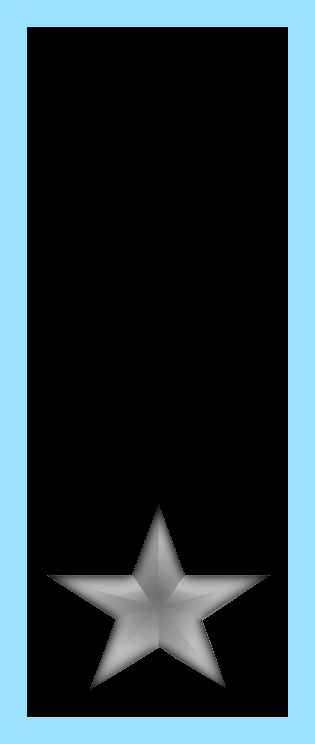
Signal technical service

== Special Voluntary Auxiliary Corps ==
The Italian Army Special Voluntary Auxiliary Corps of the Association of the Italian Knights of the Sovereign Military Order of Malta (Italian: Corpo speciale volontario ausiliario dell'Esercito Italiano dell'Associazione dei cavalieri italiani del Sovrano militare Ordine di Malta - Corpo Militare EI-SMOM) is a volunteer corps providing medical support to the Italian Army. Members of the corps wear Italian Army uniforms with a Maltese cross instead of the Italian flag and one of four approved gorget patches:

- a rectangular red patch with a white border for troops and NCOs of the Order
- a rectangular red patch with a white border and a violet point for commissariat officers
- a rectangular red patch with a white border and an amaranth point for medical or pharmacist officers
- a rectangular red patch with a white border and a black point with a bright yellow edge for officer commanders of hospital units
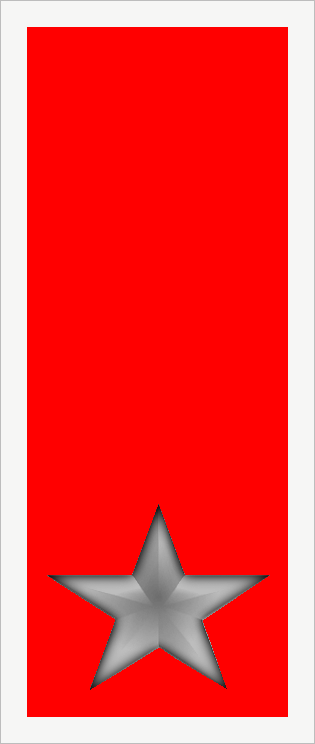
Troops and NCOs

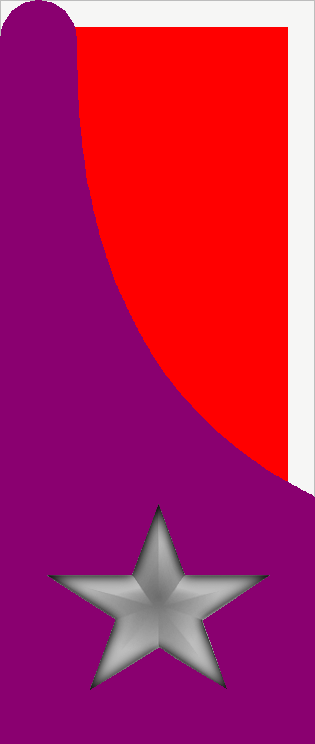
Commissariat officers

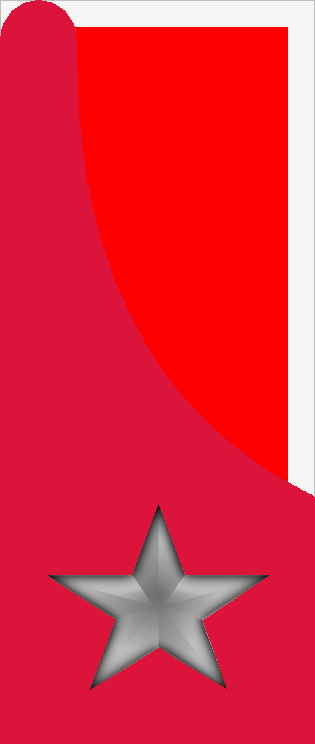
Medical and pharmacist officers

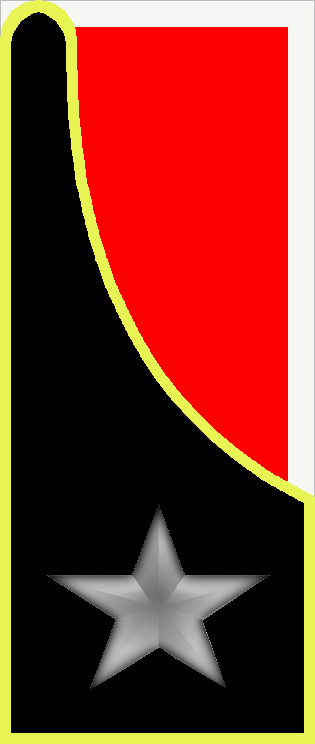
Officer commanders of hospital units

== World War II ==
=== Royal Italian Army ===
During World War II the units of the Royal Italian Army wore gorget patches of different size and form, but with the same colors. The gorget patches had a size of 60 x 32 mm and were made from colored cloth. Below follow a few examples of these historic gorget patches, while all of them can be found on Wiki Commons at: Royal Italian Army gorget patches.

Divisions carried the colors of their two infantry regiments, which was then combined with the artillery, engineer, supply and medical gorget patches. Below follow the gorget patches of the 13th Infantry Division "Re" and 17th Infantry Division "Pavia".

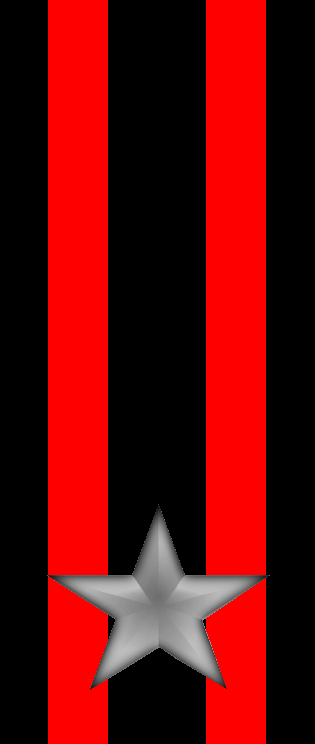
13th Infantry Division "Re" infantry

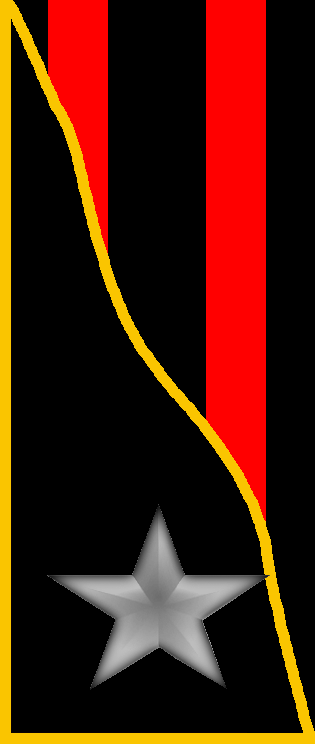
13th Infantry Division "Re" artillery

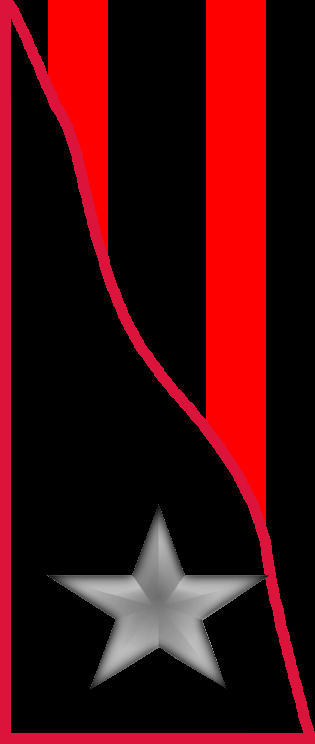
13th Infantry Division "Re" engineers

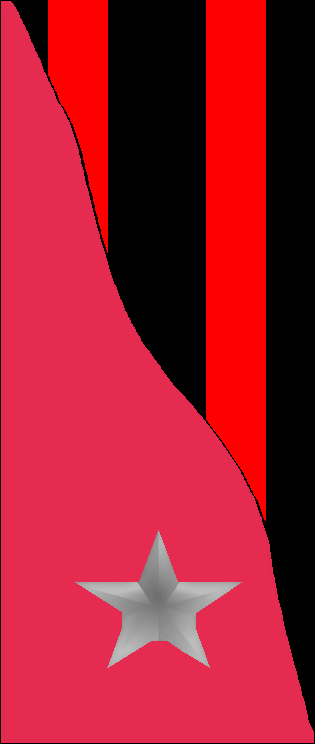
13th Infantry Division "Re" medics

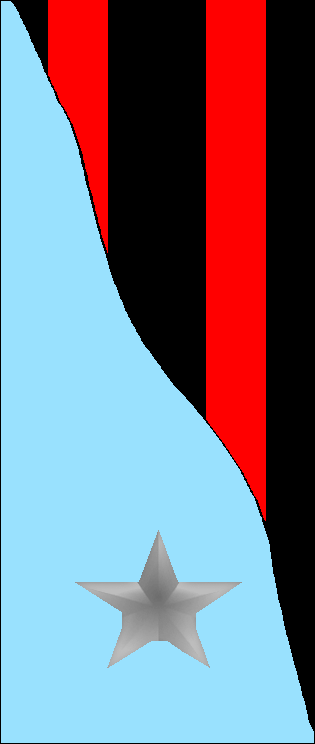
13th Infantry Division "Re" supply personnel

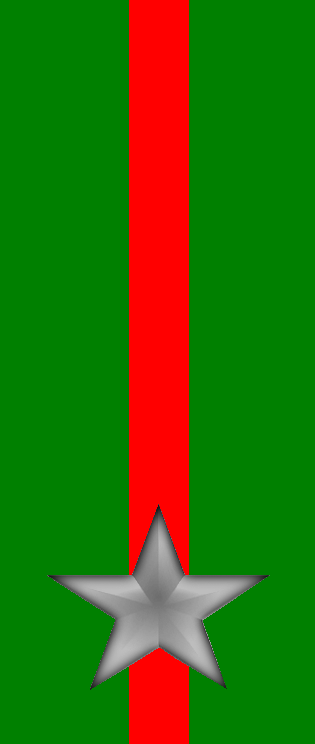
17th Infantry Division "Pavia" infantry

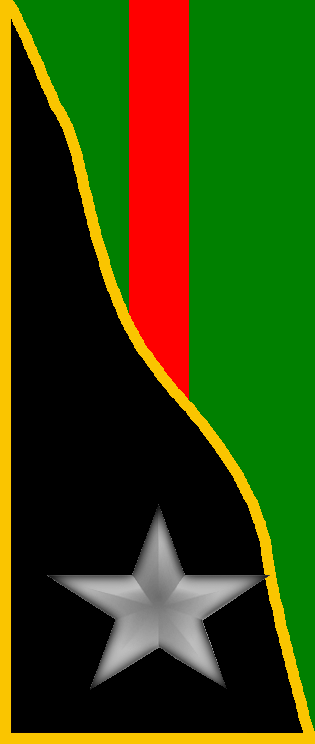
17th Infantry Division "Pavia" artillery

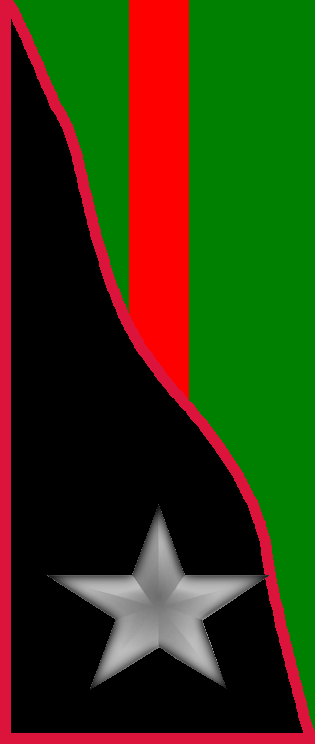
17th Infantry Division "Pavia" engineers

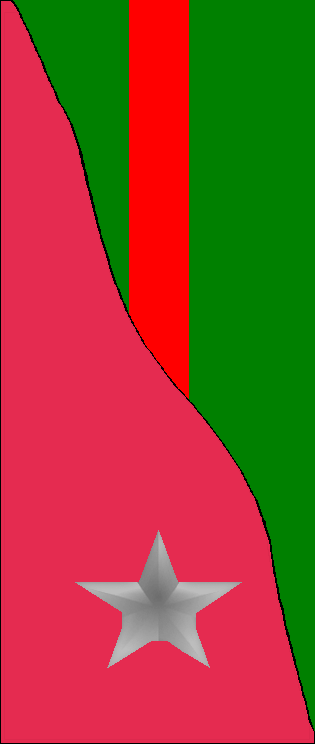
17th Infantry Division "Pavia" medics

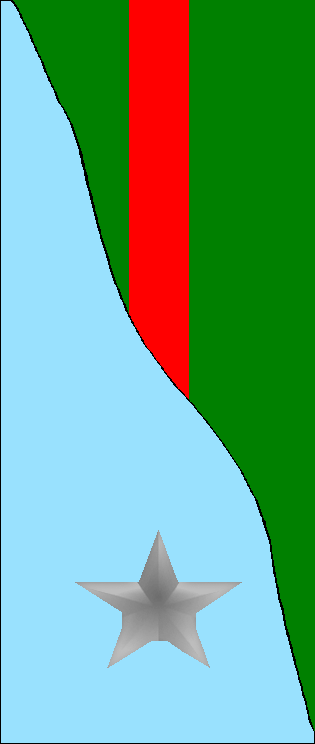
17th Infantry Division "Pavia" supply personnel

Grenadier, Alpini, armored/motorized, and paratrooper divisions had their own set of gorget patches.

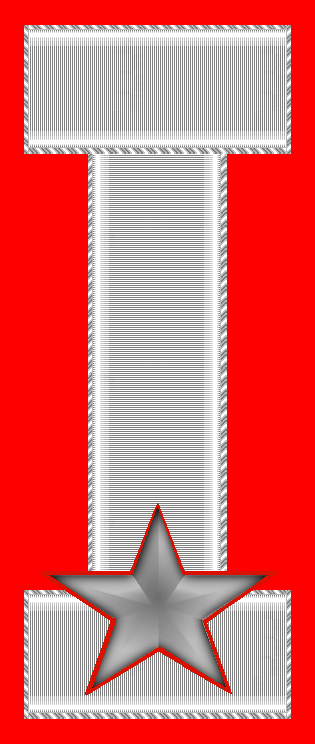
Grenadiers

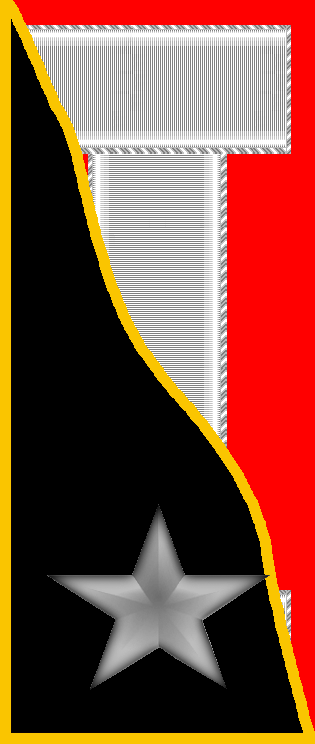
Grenadier artillery

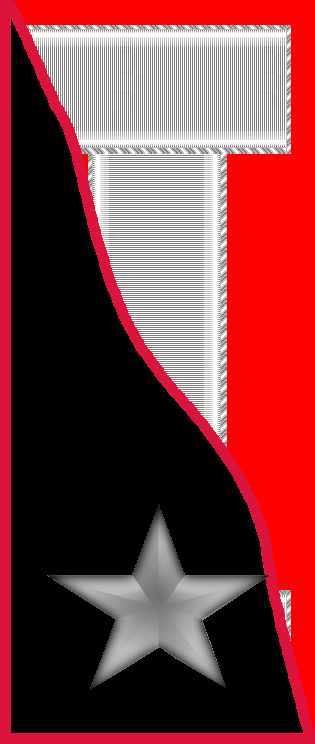
Grenadier engineers

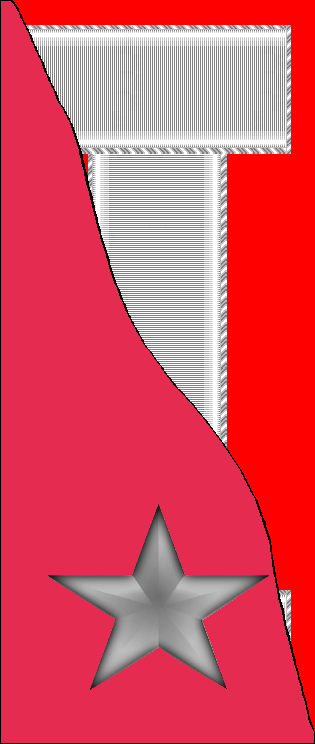
Grenadier medics

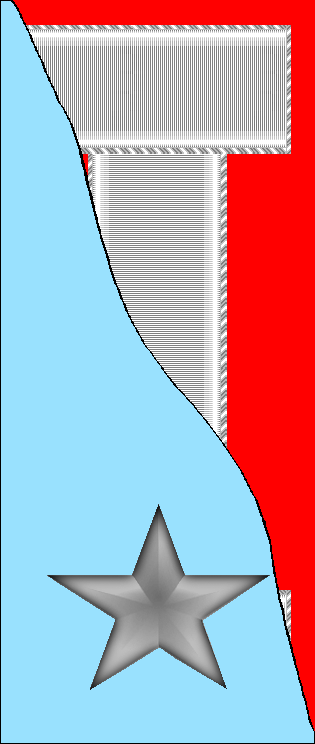
Grenadier supply personnel

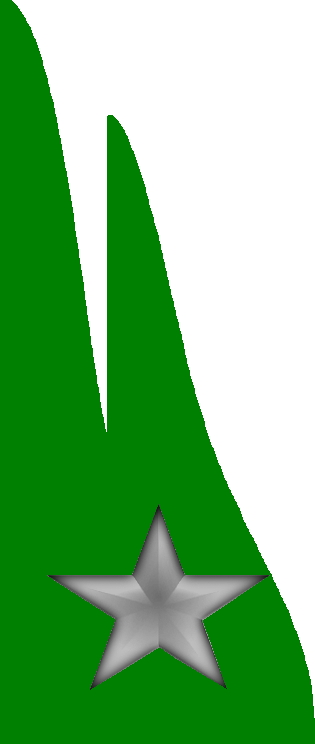
Alpini

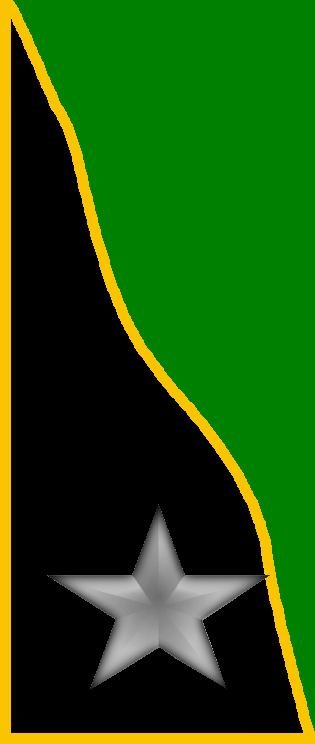
Alpine artillery

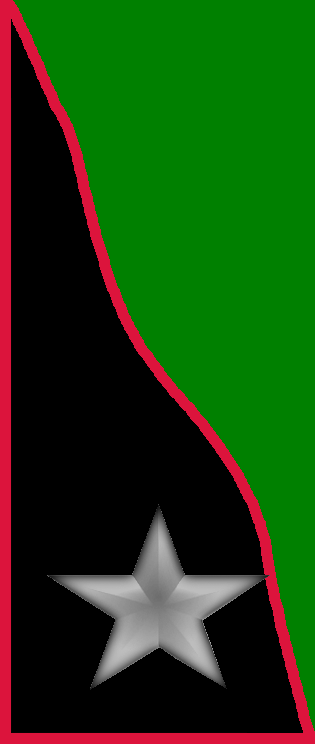
Alpine engineers

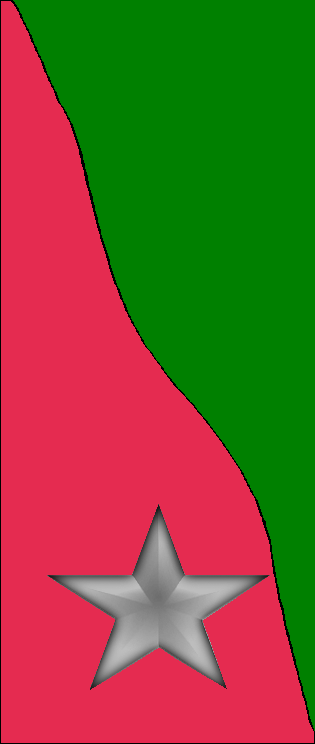
Alpine medics

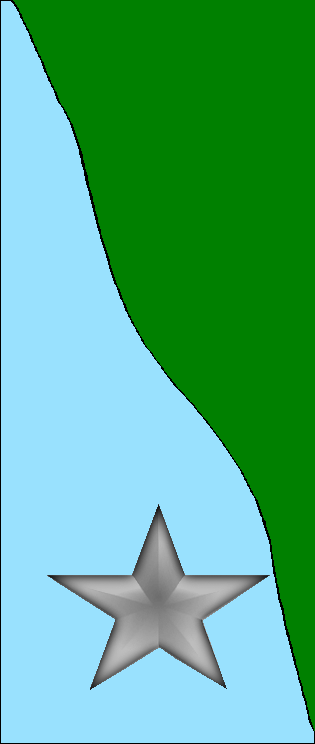
Alpine supply personnel

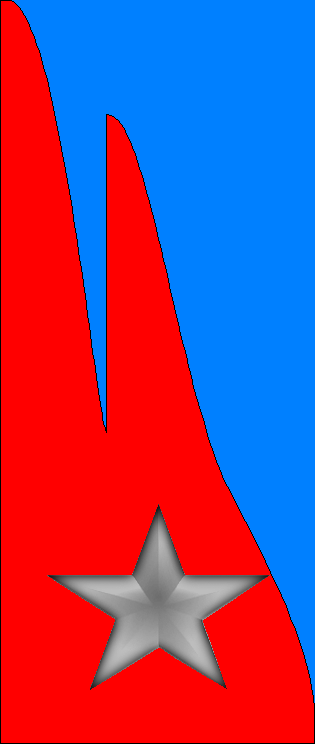
Tank infantry

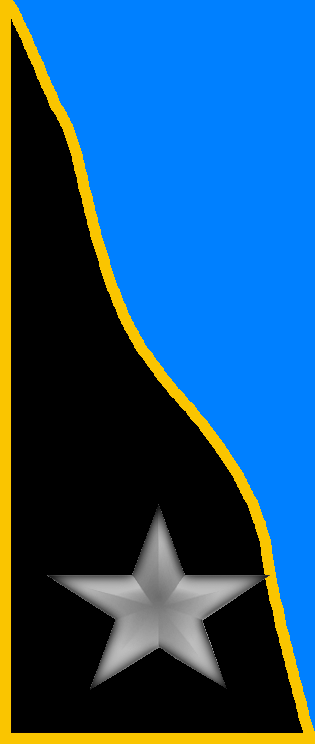
Armored artillery

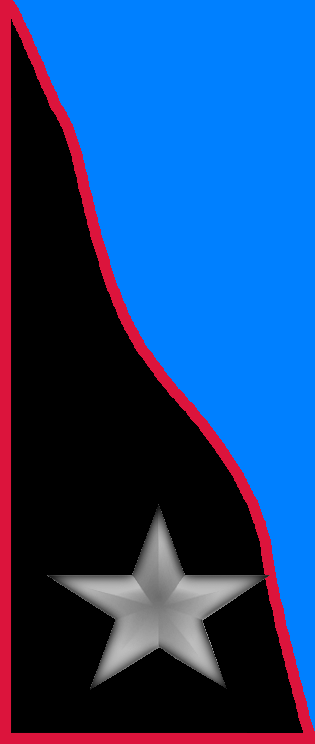
Armored engineers

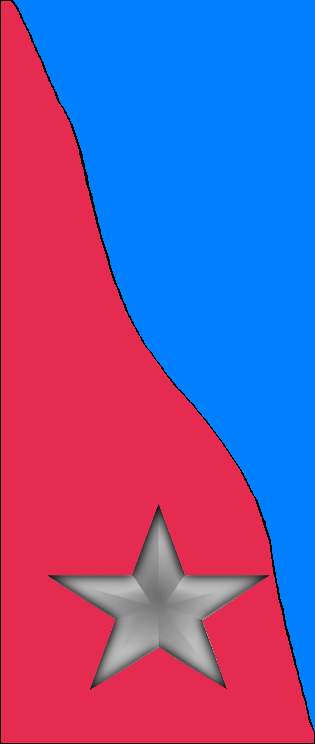
Armored medics

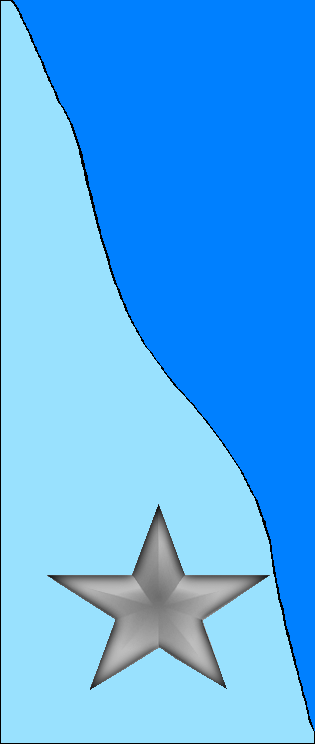
Armored supply personnel

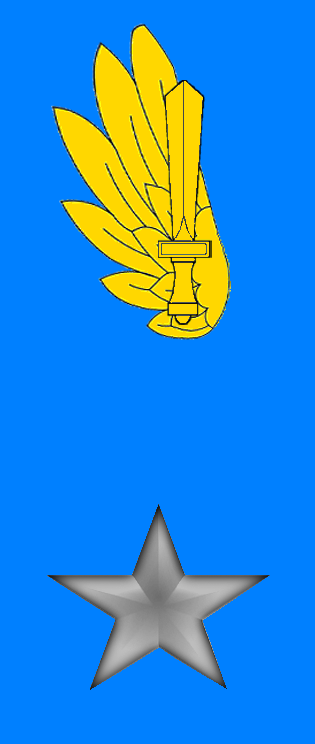
Paratroopers

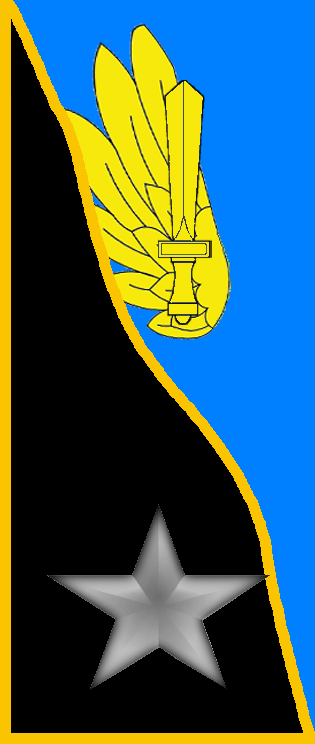
Paratroopers artillery

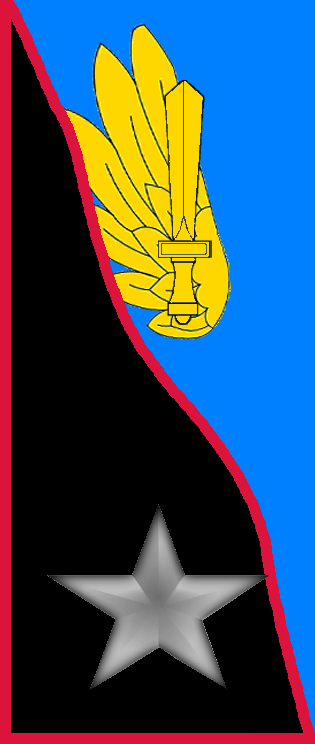
Paratrooper engineers

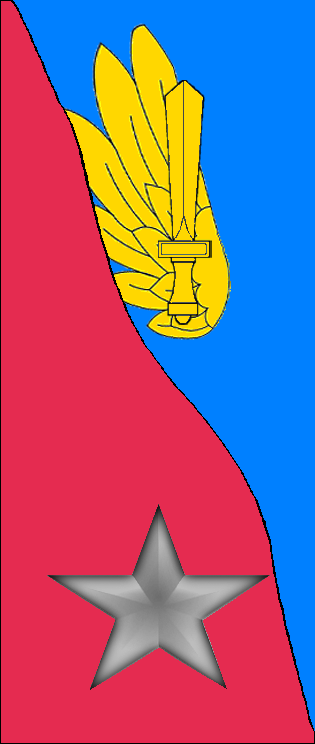
Paratrooper medics

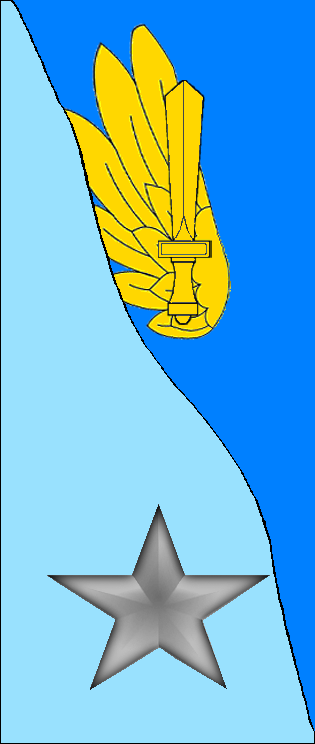
Paratroopers supply personnel

Bersaglieri, and the troops assigned to divisional mortar, machine gun, and anti-tank battalions carried the same gorget patches across all divisions. The infantry regiments assigned to motorized divisions combined their traditional regimental gorget patch with the azure color of the armored and motorized forces. Below the patch of the 61st and 62nd Infantry Regiments "Sicilia" of the 102nd Motorized Division "Trento" is given as an example for motorized regiments.

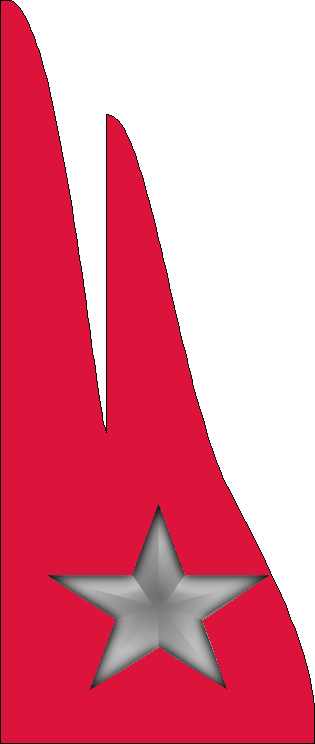
Bersaglieri

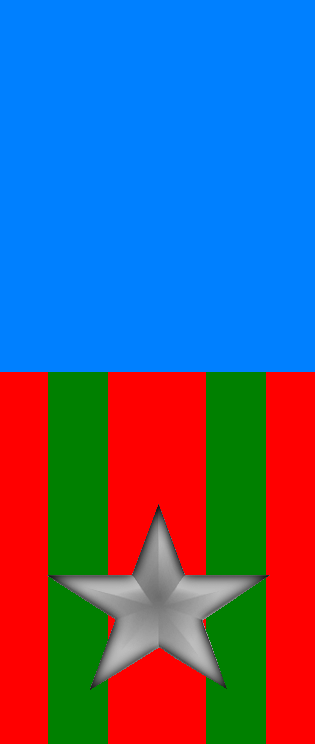
61st, 62nd Rgt. "Sicilia"

Mortar battalions

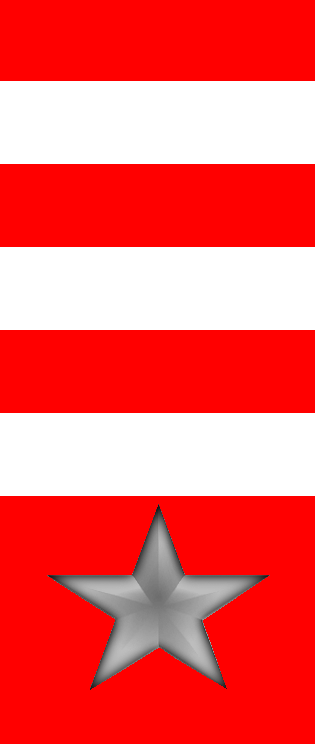
Machine Gun battalions

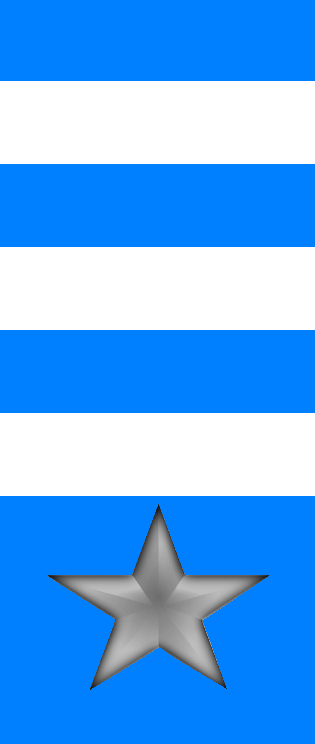
Anti-tank battalions

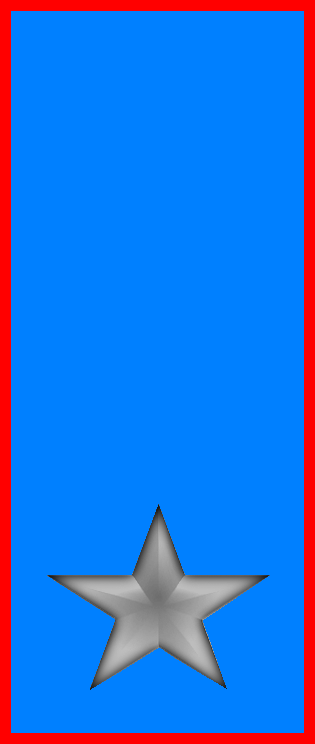
Unassigned infantry

Each Cavalry regiment had its distinct gorget patch. Associated with the cavalry were the tank groups of the three cavalry divisions, which had been raised by the Regiment "Cavalleggeri Guide" and therefore combined the form of the tank infantry gorget patch with the color scheme of the "Cavalleggeri Guide".

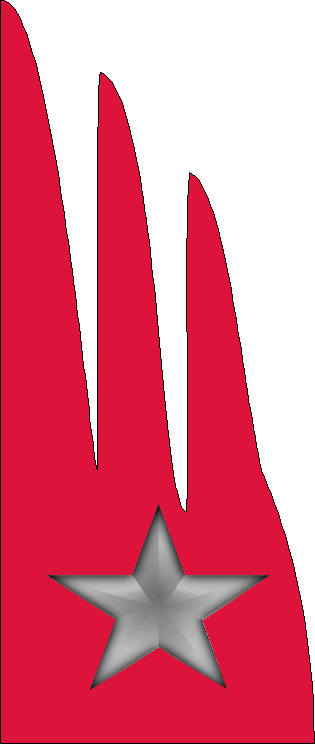
"Nizza Cavalleria"

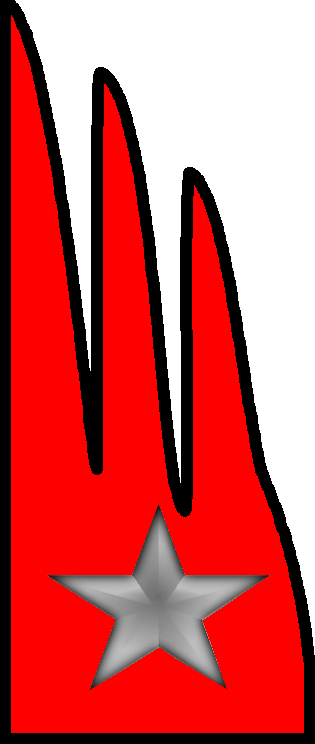
"Piemonte Reale Cavalleria"

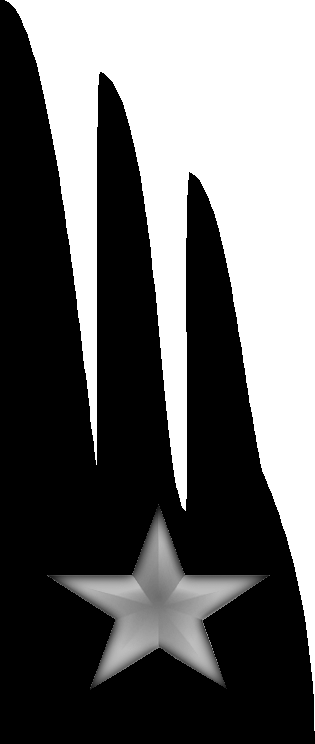
"Savoia Cavalleria"

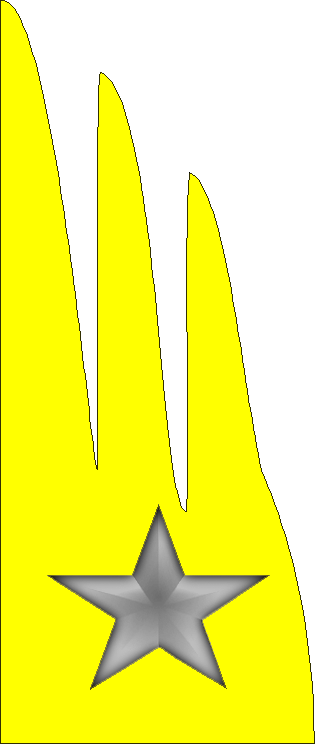
"Genova Cavalleria"

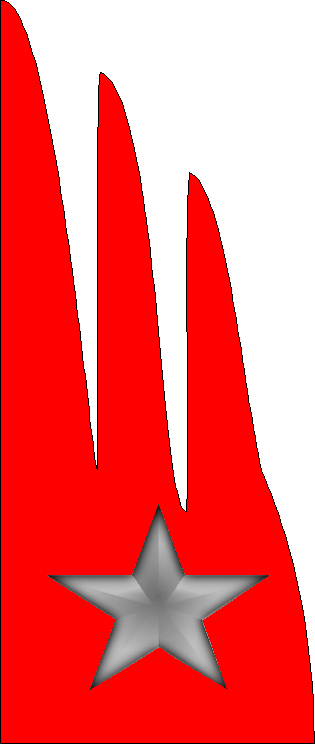
"Lancieri di Aosta"

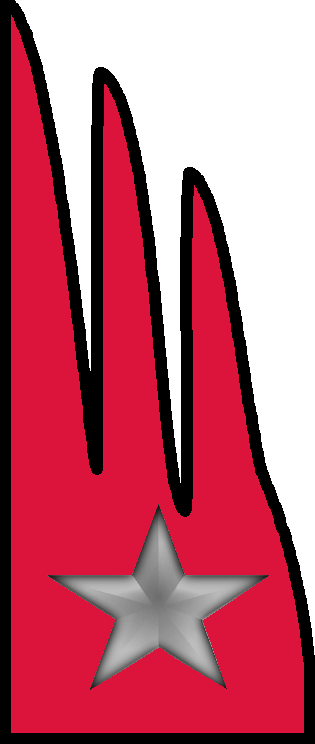
"Lancieri di Milano"

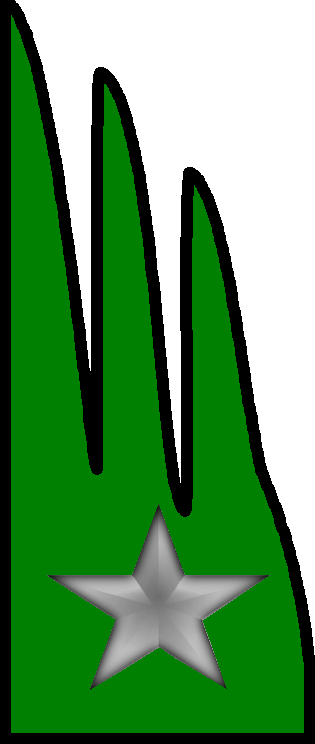
"Lancieri di Montebello"

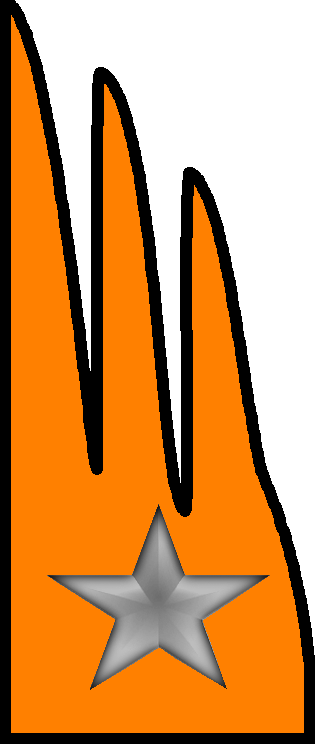
"Lancieri di Firenze"

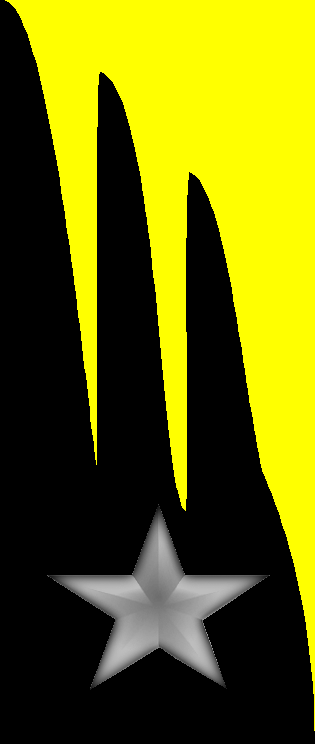
"Cavalleggeri di Saluzzo"

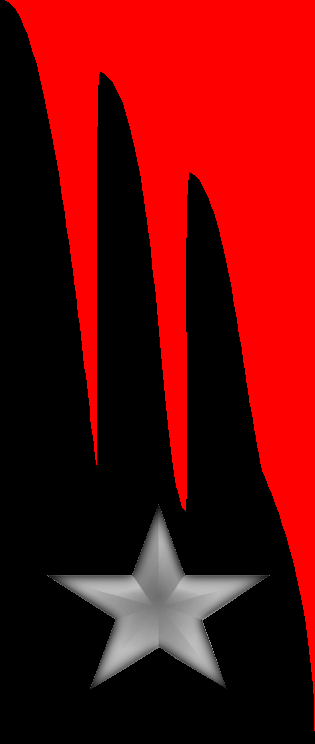
"Cavalleggeri di Lodi"

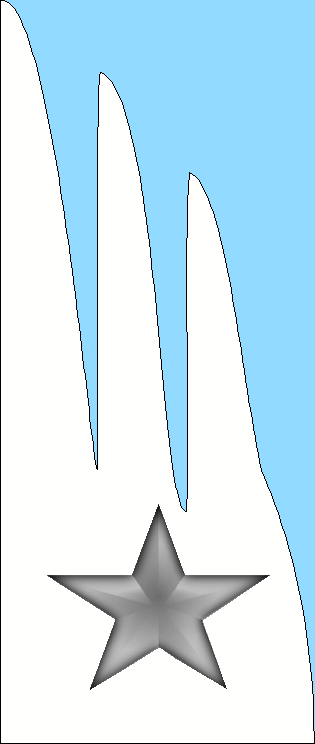
"Cavalleggeri Guide"

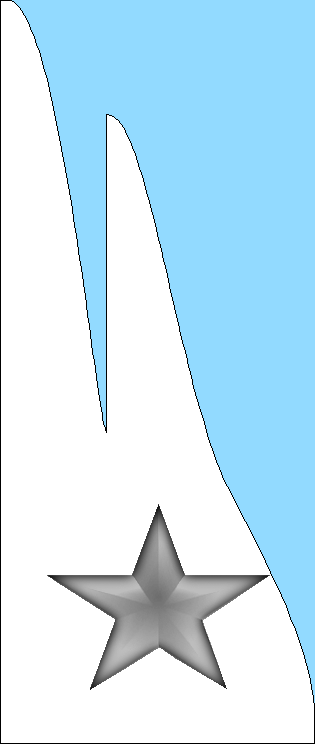
Fast tank groups

For units that were not assigned to divisions - i.e. Corps Artillery - basic gorget patches without any associated regimental colors were used.

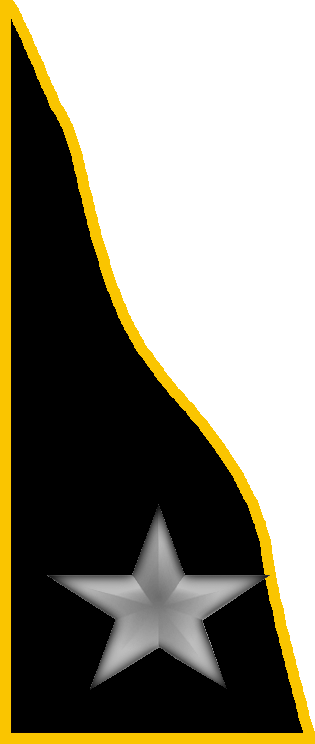
Artillery

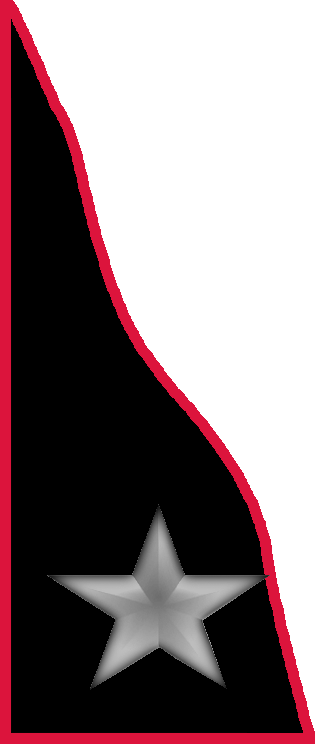
Engineers

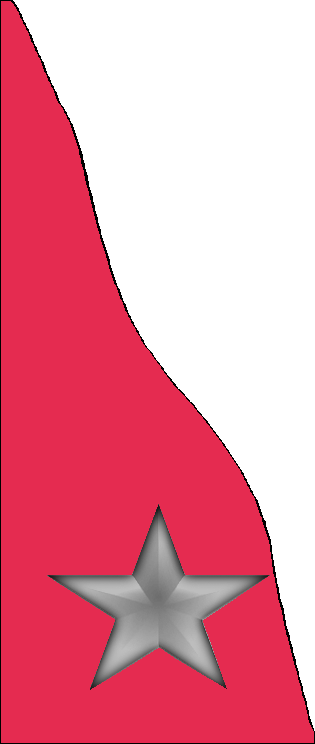
Medics

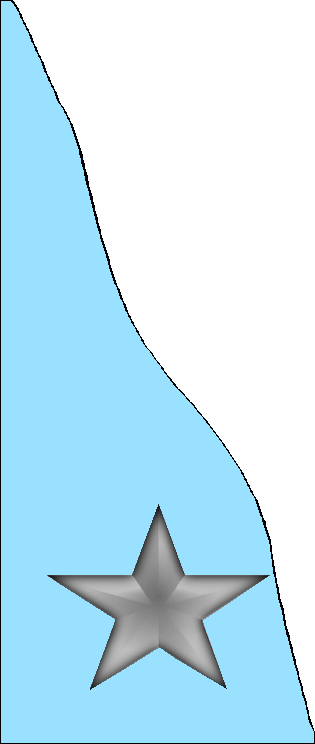
Supply troops

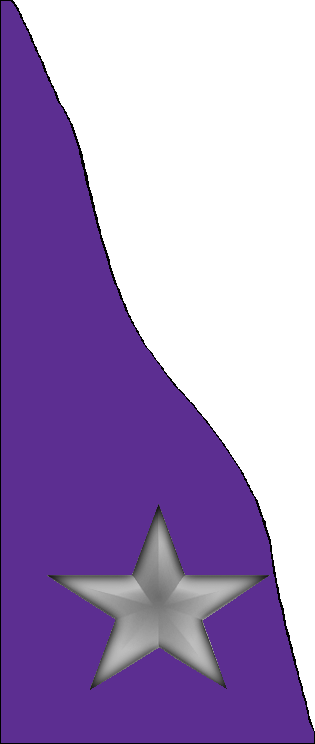
Quartermaster troops

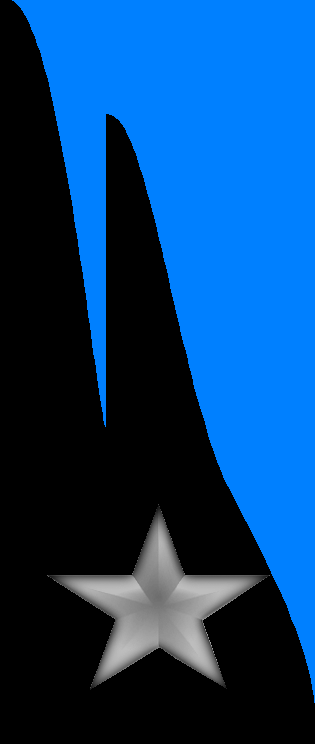
Transport troops

=== Coastal units ===
Coastal divisions were reserve units and new gorget patches were created for them: for the division patches with a triangle, and for the brigades a square with three white lines.

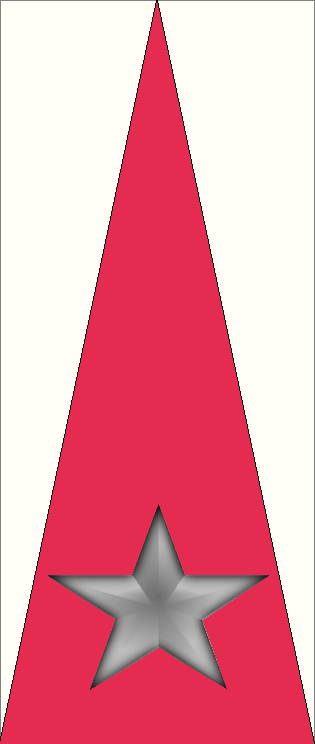
202nd Coastal Division

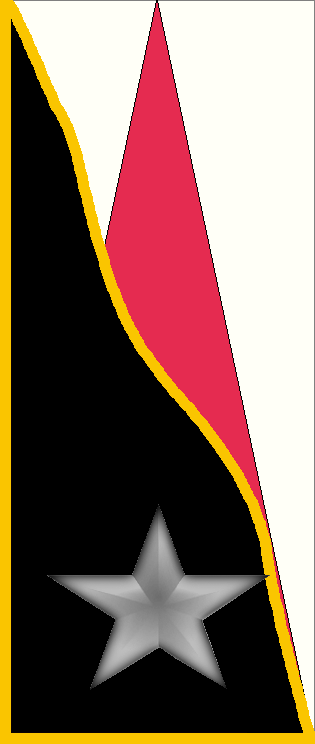
202nd Coastal Division Artillery

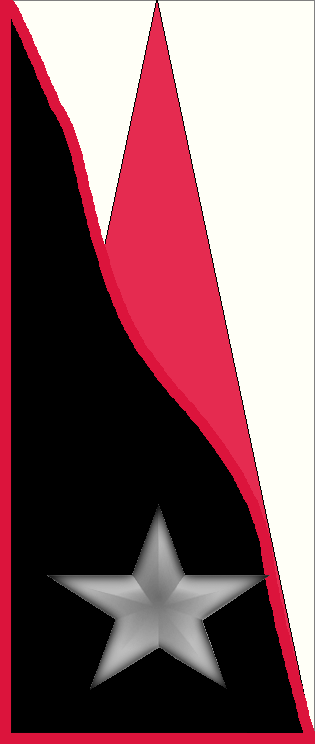
202nd Coastal Division Engineers

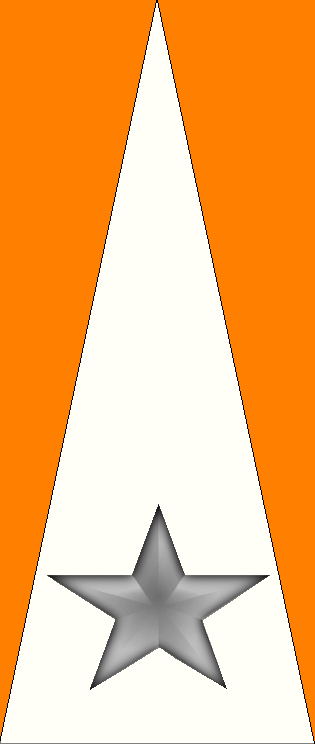
204th Coastal Division

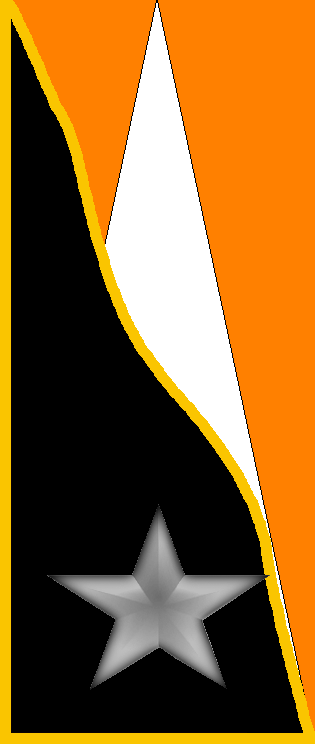
204th Coastal Division Artillery

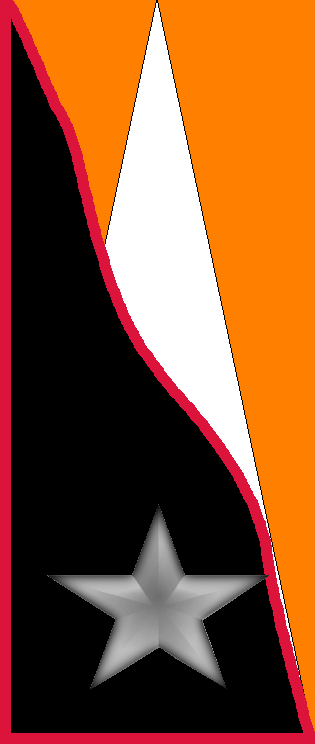
204th Coastal Division Engineers

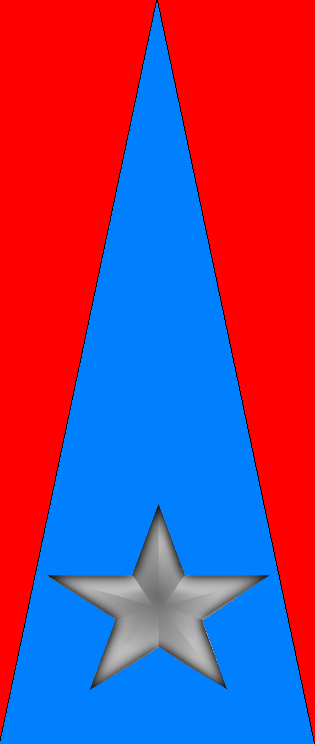
225th Coastal Division

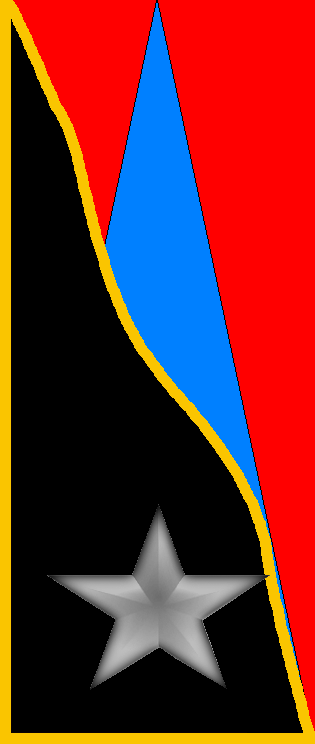
225th Coastal Division Artillery

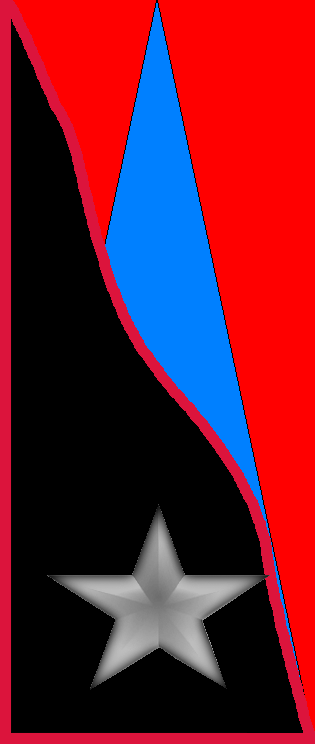
225th Coastal Division Engineers

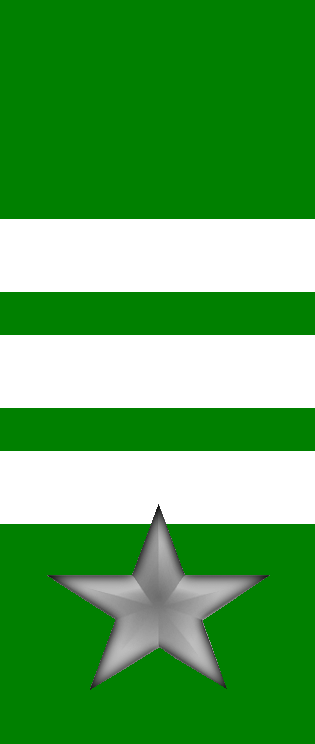
Coastal Infantry

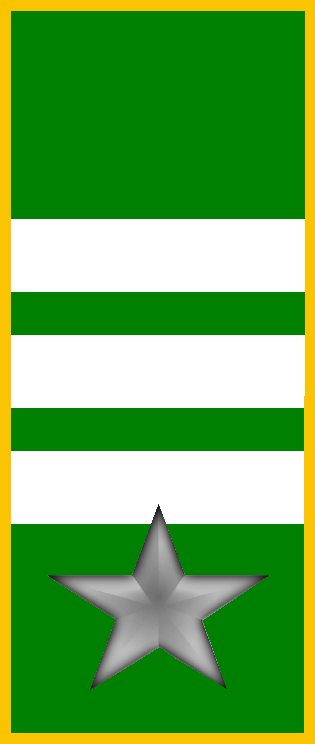
Coastal Artillery

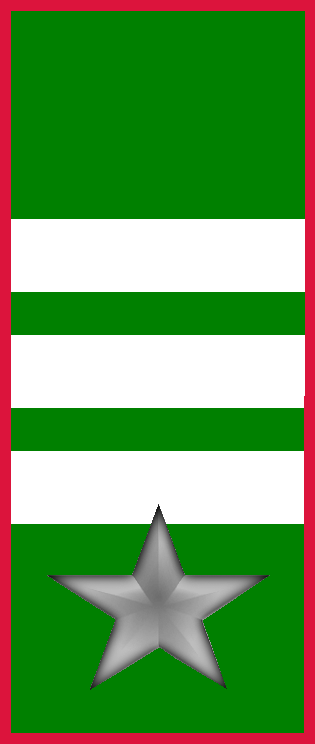
Coastal Engineers

=== CC.NN. ===
During World War II the paramilitary wing of the Italian National Fascist Party, the Milizia Volontaria per la Sicurezza Nazionale (MVSN), also known as "Blackshirts" (Italian: Camicie Nere, abbreviated as CC.NN.) raised four divisions, which were attached to the Royal Italian Army for the invasion of Egypt. Additionally the MVSN activated its paramilitary legions and battalions, which were attached to the army's divisions. The MVSN units had their own distinct gorget patches.

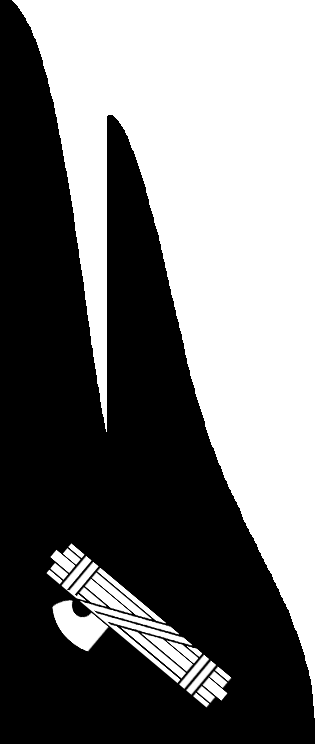
CC.NN troops

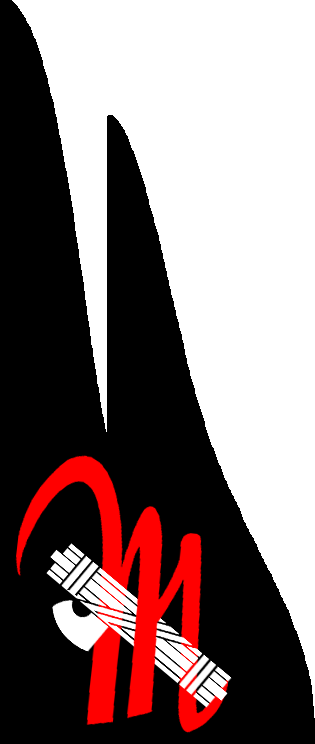
CC.NN "M" battalions

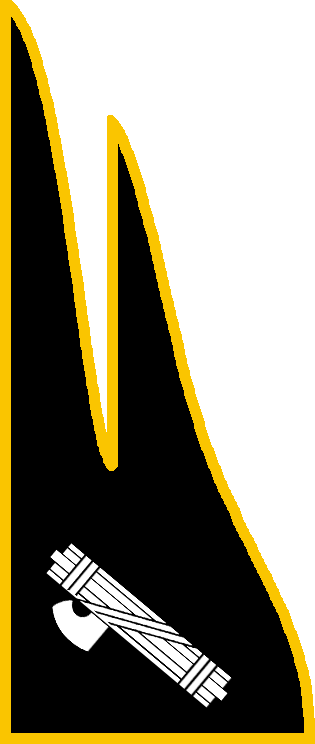
CC.NN Artillery

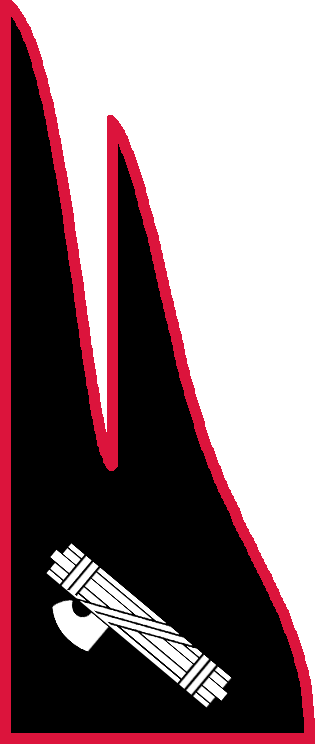
CC.NN Engineers

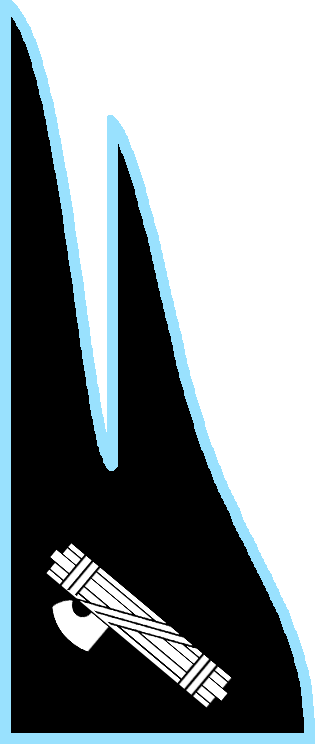
CC.NN Supply personnel

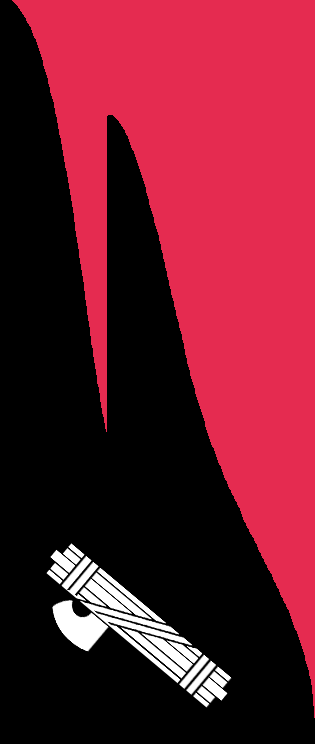
CC.NN Medical personnel

== Bibliography ==
- Viotti, Andrea (2009), Uniformi e distintivi dell'Esercito Italiano fra le due guerre 1918-1935 - Tomo Primo, Rome: Stato Maggiore dell'Esercito - Ufficio Storico
- Viotti, Andrea (2009), Uniformi e distintivi dell'Esercito Italiano fra le due guerre 1918-1935 - Tomo Secondo, Rome: Stato Maggiore dell'Esercito - Ufficio Storico
- Coccia, Sergio (2005), Le uniformi metropolitane del Regio Esercito dalla riforma Baistrocchi all'inizio della Seconda Guerra Mondiale 1933-1940 - Parte II, Rome: Stato Maggiore dell'Esercito - Ufficio Storico
