= Allais =

Allais is a French surname. Notable people with the surname include:

- Alphonse Allais (1854–1905), French writer and humorist
- David Allais (born 1933), American businessman and inventor
- Émile Allais (1912–2012), French alpine ski racer
- Jean-Jacques Allais (born 1969), French professional footballer
- Lucy Allais, philosopher
- Maurice Allais (1911–2010), French economist.
- Max Allais, musical artist
- Nicolas Viton de Saint-Allais (1773–1842), French genealogist and littérateur
- Pierre Allais (c. 1700–1782), French painter and pastel artist

== See also ==
- Allais, Kentucky, unincorporated community and coal town in Perry County, Kentucky, United States
- Allai, disambiguation
- Allais effect, claimed anomalous precession of the plane of oscillation of a pendulum during a solar eclipse
- Allais paradox, choice problem designed by Maurice Allais
