= 11th Infantry Regiment "Casale" =

Inactive Italian Army infantry unit

- 11° Reggimento Fanteria "Casale"
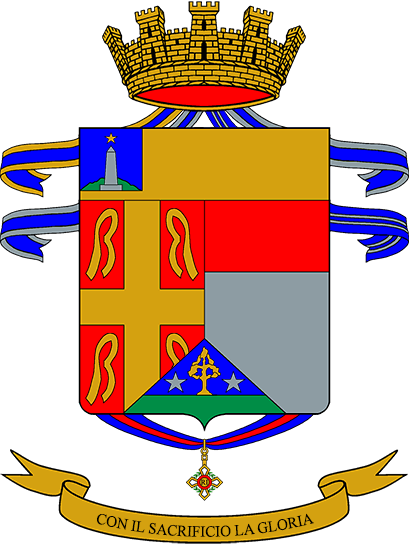
- Regimental coat of arms
- Active: 1619 – 9 Dec. 1798; 24 May 1814 – 31 May 1821; 19 Dec. 1821 – 8 Sept. 1943; 1 July 1958 – 31 Oct. 1974; 15 Nov. 1975 – 22 Jan. 1999
- Country: Italy
- Branch: Italian Army
- Part of: 1st Defence Forces Command
- Garrison/HQ: Casale Monferrato
- Motto: "Con il sacrificio la gloria"
- Anniversaries: 8 August 1916 – Battle of Gorizia
- Decorations: 1× Military Order of Italy; 1× Gold Medal of Military Valor; 2× Silver Medals of Military Valor; 1× War Cross of Military Valor

Insignia
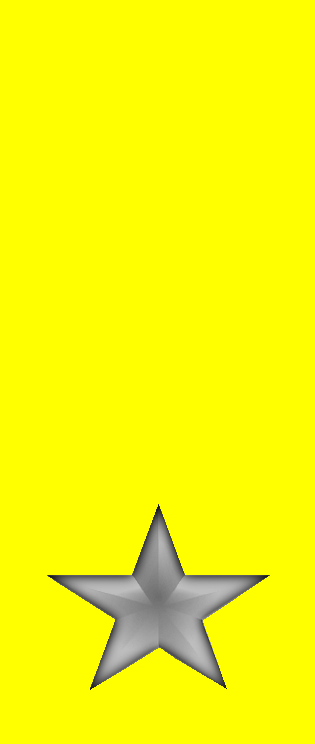
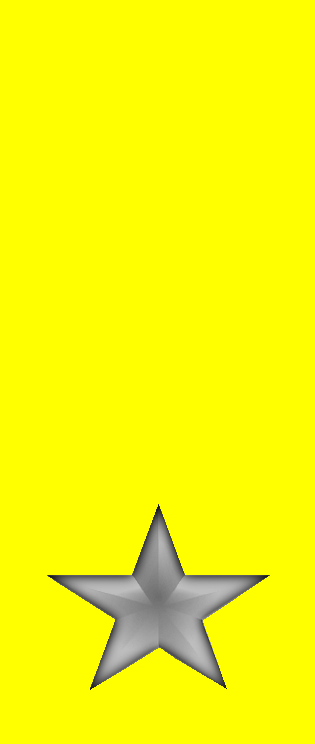
- Regimental gorget patches

The 11th Infantry Regiment "Casale" (Italian: 11° Reggimento Fanteria "Casale") is an inactive unit of the Italian Army last based in Casale Monferrato in Piedmont. The regiment is named for the city of Casale Monferrato and part of the Italian Army's infantry arm. The regiment was formed on 19 December 1821 by the Royal Sardinian Army as Brigade of "Casale", with the troops of the Brigade of "Monferrato", who had remained loyal during the revolt in Piedmont in spring 1821 and were retained in service after the Brigade of "Monferrato" was disbanded on 31 May 1821. Later the Royal Italian Army allowed the two regiments of the Brigade "Casale" to claim the traditions and honors of the Brigade of "Monferrato", for which reason the regiment's founding year is today considered to be 1619; making it the oldest infantry regiment of the Italian Army.

The Regiment du Cheynez was formed in 1619 with personnel recruited in the Duchy of Savoy. During the Thirty Years' War the regiment fought in the First Genoese–Savoyard War and then in the War of the Mantuan Succession. From 1635 to 1659, the regiment fought in the Franco-Spanish War. In 1664, the regiment was renamed Regiment of "Monferrato". The regiment then fought in the Second Genoese–Savoyard War, Nine Years' War, War of the Spanish Succession, War of the Quadruple Alliance, War of the Polish Succession, and War of the Austrian Succession. In 1792 the regiment fought in the War of the First Coalition against the French Republic. In December 1798, French troops occupied Piedmont, forced King Charles Emmanuel IV into exile, and formed the Piedmontese Republic, a French client-state. Part of the regiment's personnel was then assigned to the 2nd Line Brigade, which fought on the French side in the War of the Second Coalition against the Austrians. In May 1814 King Victor Emmanuel I returned from exile in Sardinia and the Regiment of "Monferrato" was reformed. One year later the 15 militia regiments of the Kingdom of Sardinia were disbanded and their battalions assigned as reserve units to the army's regular regiments. Consequently, on 1 November 1815, the Regiment of "Monferrato" was renamed Brigade of "Monferrato".

In March 1821 most of the brigade's personnel participated, with the troops of three other infantry brigades and three cavalry regiments, in a revolt against King Victor Emmanuel I, who abdicated in favor of his brother Charles Felix. After the revolt Charles Felix had the four infantry brigades and three cavalry regiments disbanded. The troops of the Brigade of "Monferrato", who had remained loyal during the revolt, were used to form the new Brigade of "Casale" on 19 December 1821. On the same date, the personnel of the other three brigades, which had remained loyal, was used to form the new brigades "Pinerolo", "Savona", and "Acqui". The seniority of the four new brigades was determined by drawing lots.

In 1831, the brigade was renamed Brigade "Casale" and split into two regiments, which in 1839 were designated 11th Infantry Regiment (Brigade "Casale") and 12th Infantry Regiment (Brigade "Casale"). In 1848–49, the regiment participated in the First Italian War of Independence, and in 1855–56 four of the regiment's companies fought in the Crimean War. In 1859, the regiment participated in the Second Italian War of Independence and in 1866 in the Third Italian War of Independence. In 1911–12, the regiment fought in the Italo-Turkish War. During World War I, the regiment fought on the Italian front, where the regiment distinguished itself in the Sixth Battle of the Isonzo and was awarded Italy's highest military honor the Gold Medal of Military Valor. During World War II, the regiment was assigned to the 56th Infantry Division "Casale", with which it fought in the Greco-Italian War. Afterwards the "Casale" division was sent to Aitoliko in Greece on anti-partisan duty. After the announcement of the Armistice of Cassibile on 8 September 1943, the "Casale" division and its regiments were disbanded by invading German forces.

In 1958, the regiment was reformed in Casale Monferrato as a training unit. In 1974, the regiment was disbanded and one year later the regiment's flag and traditions were assigned to the 11th Infantry Battalion "Casale", which trained recruits destined for the Mechanized Division "Mantova". In 1986, the battalion was transferred to the Northwestern Military Region. In 1997, the battalion was assigned to the 1st Defence Forces Command. In 1999, the battalion was disbanded and the flag of the 11th Infantry Regiment "Casale" transferred to the Shrine of the Flags in the Vittoriano in Rome. The regiment's anniversary falls on 8 August 1916, the day during the Sixth Battle of the Isonzo the regiment crossed the Isonzo river and established a bridgehead near the city of Gorizia. For this feat the regiments was awarded Italy's highest military honor the Gold Medal of Military Valor.

== History ==
=== Formation ===
In 1619, one year after the outbreak of the Thirty Years' War, the Regiment du Cheynez was formed with personnel recruited in the Duchy of Savoy. The regiment, which consisted of ten companies, was named after its first owner and commander Colonel du Cheynez. In 1625, the regiment fought in the First Genoese-Savoyard War, and then in 1628–31 in the War of the Mantuan and Montferrat Succession. In 1630, Colonel du Cheynez died and the regiment changed its name to reflect its new owner and commander, and was then named Regiment Boydanid. From 1635 to 1659 the regiment fought in the Franco-Spanish War. In 1645, the regiment was renamed Regiment Pianezza, and in 1649 Regiment Livorno.

By 1660, the regiment recruited its troops in the Principality of Piedmont. In 1664, Duke Charles Emmanuel II established five national regiments, which were named for his dominions: Regiment of Savoia for the Duchy of Savoy, Regiment of Piemonte for the Principality of Piedmont, Regiment of Aosta for the Duchy of Aosta, and Regiment of Nizza for the County of Nice. The Regiment Livorno was renamed Regiment of "Monferrato" for the Duchy of Montferrat, which Duke Charles Emmanuel II claimed as his dominion, but did not actually control until 1708.

=== Cabinet Wars ===
In 1672–73, the regiment participated in the Second Genoese–Savoyard War, during which it fought in the battles of Garlenda and Ovada. Between 1690 and 1697 the regiment participated in the Nine Years' War against the Kingdom of France. The regiment fought in 1690 in the Battle of Staffarda and in 1693 in the Battle of Marsaglia. In 1701, Duke Victor Amadeus II joined the War of the Spanish Succession and the regiment fought in 1702 in the Battle of Luzzara and then in 1706 in the Defense of Turin. In 1713, the war ended with the Peace of Utrecht, which transferred the Kingdom of Sicily and parts of the Duchy of Milan to Savoy. In October 1713 Victor Amadeus II and his wife, Anne Marie d'Orléans, travelled from Nice to Palermo, where on 24 December 1713 they were crowned in the cathedral of Palermo King and Queen of Sicily.

In July 1718, the Kingdom of Spain landed troops on Sicily and tried to recover the Kingdom of Sicily from Savoy rule. On 2 August 1718, Britain, France, Austria, and the Dutch Republic formed an alliance to defeat Spain in the War of the Quadruple Alliance, during which the Regiment of "Monferrato" served in Sicily. The war ended with the 1720 Treaty of The Hague, which restored the position prior to 1717, but with Savoy and Austria exchanging Sardinia and Sicily. In 1733, King Charles Emmanuel III joined the War of the Polish Succession on the French-Spanish side. In 1734, the regiment fought in the Battle of San Pietro against Austrian forces. In 1742, King Charles Emmanuel III joined the War of the Austrian Succession on the Austrian side and the Regiment of "Monferrato" fought in 1744 in the Battle of Madonna dell'Olmo.

=== French Revolutionary Wars ===
On 21 September 1792, French forces invaded the Duchy of Savoy and on 29 September the County of Nice. Due to these unprovoked attacks King Victor Amadeus III joined the War of the First Coalition against the French Republic. From 1792 to 1796, the regiment fought against the French Army of Italy. In March 1796, Napoleon Bonaparte arrived in Italy and took command of the French forces, with which he defeated the Royal Sardinian Army in the Montenotte campaign within a month. On 28 April 1796, King Victor Amadeus III had to sign the Armistice of Cherasco and on 15 May 1796 the Treaty of Paris, which forced Sardinia out of the First Coalition.

In fall of 1798, France invaded the remaining territories of King Charles Emmanuel IV. On 6 December 1798, French forces occupied Turin and on 8 December 1798 Charles Emmanuel IV was forced to sign a document of abdication, which also ordered his former subjects to recognise French laws and his troops to obey the orders of the French Army. Charles Emmanuel IV went into exile on Sardinia, while his former territories became the Piedmontese Republic. On 9 December 1798, the Sardinian troops were released from their oath of allegiance to the King and sworn to the Piedmontese Republic. Part of the personnel of the Regiment of "Monferrato" choose to remain in service and were assigned to the 2nd Line Brigade, which fought on the French side in the War of the Second Coalition against the Austrians. On 5 April 1799, the Austrians won the Battle of Magnano and the French were forced out of Italy. With the French retreat the Piedmontese Republic dissolved and all of the republic's regiments were disbanded in May 1799.

=== Restoration ===
On 6 April 1814, Emperor Napoleon abdicated and on 11 April the winners of the War of the Sixth Coalition exiled him to the island of Elba. On 20 May 1814, King Victor Emmanuel I returned from exile in Sardinia to Turin. On 24 May 1814, Victor Emmanuel I ordered to reform the regiments disbanded in 1799, including the Regiment of "Monferrato". Each regiment consisted of a staff, and two battalions, both of which fielded one grenadier company, four fusilier companies, and one Jäger company. On 27 June 1814, King Victor Emmanuel I ordered that the 15 provincial militia regiments should be reformed with the same organization as the regular regiments. On 26 February 1815, Napoleon escaped from Elba and landed on 1 March 1815 in Golfe-Juan in France. This triggered the War of the Seventh Coalition, which Sardinia joined against France. The 1st Battalion of the Regiment of "Monferrato", together with the first battalions of all other Sardinian regiments, fought in the Hundred Days campaign, while the regiment's 2nd Battalion, together with the second battalions of all other Sardinian regiments, remained in Piedmont on garrison duty. During the Hundred Days campaign the 1st Battalion fought on 6 July 1815 at Grenoble.

In October 1815, the provincial regiments were disbanded and their battalions assigned to the regular regiments as reserve battalions. The Regiment of "Monferrato" received the 1st Battalion of the Provincial Regiment of "Casale" and both battalions of the Provincial Regiment of "Novara". Consequently, on 1 November 1815, the regiment was renamed Brigade of "Monferrato". Each brigade consisted of two battalions in peacetime and four reserve battalions, which would be mobilized in wartime. The battalions had a strength of 789 men and consisted of a staff, a grenadier company, and six fusilier companies. At the same time the battalion's Jäger companies were used to form independent light infantry battalions. The brigade's peacetime organizations was then as follows.

- Brigade of "Monferrato"
  - Regimental Staff
  - 1st Battalion
    - 1st Grenadier Company
    - 1st Division, consisting of the 1st and 3rd fusilier companies
    - 2nd Division, consisting of the 5th and 7th fusilier companies
    - 3rd Division, consisting of the 9th and 11th fusilier companies
  - 2nd Battalion
    - 2nd Grenadier Company
    - 1st Division, consisting of the 2nd and 4th fusilier companies
    - 2nd Division, consisting of the 6th and 8th fusilier companies
    - 3rd Division, consisting of the 10th and 12th fusilier companies

The brigade was assigned the provinces of Novara, Casale, Ossola, Pallanza, and Valsesia as recruiting zone. On 9 October 1819, King Victor Emmanuel I ordered to reduce the number of troops per battalion to 600 men, while adding two additional reserve battalions to each regiment.

=== Revolt of 1821 ===
After returning from exile King Victor Emmanuel I abolished all the freedoms granted by the Napoleonic Code and established a fiercely oppressive rule. The widespread resentment of this kind of rule led in March 1821 to a liberal revolt in Piedmont. Four infantry brigades (Brigade of "Monferrato", Brigade of "Saluzzo", Brigade of "Alessandria", Brigade of "Genova") and three cavalry regiments (Regiment "Dragoni del Re", Regiment "Dragoni della Regina", Regiment "Cavalleggeri del Re") sided with the revolutionaries against Victor Emmanuel I, who, on 13 March 1821, abdicated in favor of his brother Charles Felix. Charles Felix asked for Austrian troops to help suppress the revolt. On 8 April 1815, the rebellious units were dispersed by a joint Austro-Sardinian army near Novara.

On 31 May 1821, the four infantry brigades, which had sided with the revolutionaries, were stricken from the rolls of the Royal Sardinian Army and their personnel dismissed from service, while the troops of the stricken brigades, who had not participated in the revolt, were assigned to four provisional line battalions. The troops of the Brigade of "Monferrato", who remained in service, were assigned to the 1st Provisional Line Battalion, while the remaining troops of the Brigade of "Saluzzo" were assigned to the 2nd Provisional Line Battalion, the troops of the Brigade of "Alessandria" to the 3rd Provisional Line Battalion, and the troops of the Brigade of "Genova" to the 4th Provisional Line Battalion. On 19 December 1821, the four provisional line battalions were used to form four new infantry brigades:

- Brigade of "Casale": formed with the 1st Provisional Line Battalion and the Italian Jäger Battalion
- Brigade of "Pinerolo": formed with the 2nd Provisional Line Battalion and the 2nd Battalion of the Royal Light Legion
- Brigade of "Acqui": formed with the 3rd Provisional Line Battalion and the 3rd Battalion of the Royal Light Legion
- Brigade of "Savona": formed with the 4th Provisional Line Battalion and a battalion of new recruits

The order of precedence of the battalions within the brigades, as well as the seniority and thus the order of precedence of the four new brigades, was determined by drawing lots. The result ranked the Brigade of "Casale" as the oldest, the Brigade of "Pinerolo" as the second oldest, the Brigade of "Savona" as the third oldest, and the Brigade of "Acqui" as the youngest of the new brigades.

=== Reforms of 1830, 1831, and 1839 ===
On 1 December 1830, the Royal Sardinian Army's infantry brigades were reorganized. Each brigade consisted afterwards of a staff and five battalions: a grenadier battalion with four grenadier companies, two fusilier battalions with six fusilier companies per battalion, a Jäger battalion with four Jäger companies, and a depot battalion with six fusilier companies. The latter six fusilier companies consisted in peacetime only of training personnel, which in wartime would have trained the recruits destined to reinforce the brigade's fusilier battalions. Each brigade consisted in peacetime of 105 officers and 2,990 enlisted, which would have increased to 4,069 troops in wartime.

On 25 October 1831, the Royal Sardinian Army's infantry brigades were reorganized once more: each brigade added two regimental commands, which were numbered 1st Regiment and 2nd Regiment. Each regiment consisted of two battalions in peacetime and three battalions in wartime. Each battalion consisted of four fusilier companies, a grenadier company, and a Jäger company. The Brigade "Casale" then consisted of the 1st Regiment (Brigade "Casale") and 2nd Regiment (Brigade "Casale"). On 9 June 1832, the regiment's third battalions were reorganized as depot battalions. On 4 May 1839, the regiments were renamed infantry regiment and renumbered by seniority from 1 to 18. The two regiments of the Brigade "Casale" were now designated 11th Infantry Regiment (Brigade "Casale") and 12th Infantry Regiment (Brigade "Casale"). Each regiment consisted of the I and II battalions with one grenadier company and three fusilier companies per battalion, the III Battalion with four Jäger companies, and the IV Battalion, which was a depot battalion with four fusilier companies.

=== First Italian War of Independence ===
In 1848–49, the 11th Infantry Regiment (Brigade "Casale") participated in the First Italian War of Independence, fighting in 1848 in the battles of Mantua, Santa Lucia, Goito, and Milan, and in 1849 in the battles of Sforzesca and Novara. On 23 March 1849, after being defeated in the Battle of Novara, King Charles Albert abdicated in favour of his son Victor Emmanuel. On 24 March, the new king met with the Austrian Field Marshal Radetzky at Vignale and agreed to an armistice, which ended the First Italian War of Independence. On 12 October 1849, the Royal Sardinian Army's 18 infantry regiments were reorganized and then consisted of a staff and three battalions of four fusilier companies per battalion. In April 1850, each regiment added a fourth battalion with four fusilier companies.

In 1855, the first company of each of the regiment's four battalions, namely the 1st, 5th, 9th and 13th Company, were assigned to the 1st Battalion of the 5th Provisional Regiment, which was part of the Sardinian Expeditionary Corps in the Crimean War. In Crimea the battalion fought in the Battle of the Chernaya and then participated in the Siege of Sevastopol.

=== Second Italian War of Independence ===
In 1859, the 11th Infantry Regiment (Brigade "Casale") participated in the Second Italian War of Independence, fighting in the Battle of Solferino and then the Siege of Peschiera. For its conduct on 24 June 1859 in the Battle of Solferino the regiment was awarded a Silver Medal of Military Valor, which was affixed to the regiment's flag. In fall 1859, the armies of the Second French Empire and the Kingdom of Sardinia occupied Lombard part of the Kingdom of Lombardy–Venetia, as well as the Duchy of Modena and Reggio, the Duchy of Parma and Piacenza, and the Papal Legations of the Romagne. On 1 November 1859, the Royal Sardinian Army formed eight new infantry regiments to garrison the occupied territories. Each existing infantry regiment, with the exception of the 1st Infantry Regiment and 2nd Infantry Regiment of the Brigade "Re", ceded its III Battalion and three depot companies, to help form the new infantry regiments. Consequently, on 1 November 1859, the 11th Infantry Regiment and 12th Infantry Regiment of the Brigade "Casale" ceded their III Battalion and three depot companies to form the 23rd Infantry Regiment, which on the same day was assigned to the newly formed Brigade "Como".

On 1 March 1860, the 11th Infantry Regiment ceded a company to help form the 27th Infantry Regiment (Brigade "Pavia"), while the 12th Infantry Regiment ceded a company to help form the 28th Infantry Regiment (Brigade "Pavia"). On 5 May 1860, Giuseppe Garibaldi's Expedition of the Thousand set off, with the support of the Sardinian government, from Genoa and landed on 11 May in Marsala in Sicily. On 15 May 1860, Garibaldi won the Battle of Calatafimi and the Sardinian government decided to send reinforcements to Sicily. This triggered the Sardinian campaign in central and southern Italy. After the successful conclusion of Garibaldi's Expedition of the Thousand the Kingdom of Sardinia annexed the Kingdom of the Two Sicilies and most of the Papal Legations. On 17 March 1861, King Victor Emmanuel II proclaimed himself King of Italy.

=== Third Italian War of Independence ===
On 16 April 1861, the 11th Infantry Regiment and 12th Infantry Regiment ceded both one battalion to help form the 60th Infantry Regiment (Brigade "Calabria"). On 1 August 1862, the 11th Infantry Regiment ceded its 17th Company, 18th Company and depot company to help form the 69th Infantry Regiment (Brigade "Ancona"), while the 12th Infantry Regiment ceded its 17th Company and 18th Company to help form the 69th Infantry Regiment (Brigade "Ancona") and one depot company to help form the 70th Infantry Regiment (Brigade "Ancona"). From 1861 to 1867, the Brigade "Casale" was repeatedly deployed to the South of Italy to suppress the anti-Sardinian revolt, which had erupted in Southern Italy after the annexation of the Kingdom of the Two Sicilies. From 1862 to 1867 the 11th Infantry Regiment was based in Naples, while the 12th Infantry Regiment was based from 1861 to 1863 in Naples and then was based in Reggio Calabria until 1866. During its time in Naples the 11th Infantry Regiment operated against the rebels in San Pietro Infine, Pastena, Formia, and the Mainarde mountains. In 1866, the Brigade "Casale" participated in the Third Italian War of Independence.

On 25 October 1871, the brigade level was abolished, and the two regiments of the Brigade "Casale" were renamed 11th Infantry Regiment "Casale", respectively 12th Infantry Regiment "Casale". On 2 January 1881, the brigade level was reintroduced, and the two regiments were renamed again as 11th Infantry Regiment (Brigade "Casale") and 12th Infantry Regiment (Brigade "Casale"). On 1 November 1884, the 11th Infantry Regiment ceded some of its companies to help form the 89th Infantry Regiment (Brigade "Salerno"), while the 12th Infantry Regiment ceded some of its companies to help form the 90th Infantry Regiment (Brigade "Salerno"). In 1887–88, the regiment's 1st Company deployed to Massawa for the Italo-Ethiopian War of 1887–1889, which led to the establishment of the Italian colony of Eritrea. In 1895–96, the regiment provided eleven officers and 281 enlisted for units deployed to Italian Eritrea for the First Italo-Ethiopian War.

=== Italo-Turkish War ===
In 1912, the 11th Infantry Regiment was deployed to Libya for the Italo-Turkish War. The regiment operated in the Cyrenaica in the area of Derna. In 1912, the regiment fought in the Battle of Misrata and Battle of Derna. On 17 September 1912, the regiment's I Battalion distinguished itself in combat at Gars Ras El-Leben, for which the 11th Infantry Regiment was awarded a Silver Medal of Military Valor, which was affixed to the regiment's flag and added to the regiment's coat of arms. In 1913, the regiment remained in Libya and fought against local rebels.

=== World War I ===
At the outbreak of World War I, the Brigade "Casale" formed, together with the Brigade "Pavia" and the 14th Field Artillery Regiment, the 7th Division. At the time the 11th Infantry Regiment consisted of three battalions, each of which fielded four fusilier companies and one machine gun section. On 1 March 1915, the depot of the 12th Infantry Regiment in Cesena formed the command of the Brigade "Macerata" and the 122nd Infantry Regiment for the new brigade. On 24 May 1915, the day after Italy's entry into the war, the Brigade "Casale" advanced towards Podgora hill on the right bank of the lower Isonzo river, which covered the approach to the city of Gorizia. The Brigade "Casale" was tasked with taking the hill and opening the way to Gorizia. An attack during the First Battle of the Isonzo 23 June to 7 July 1915 resulted in no gains. Between 18 July and 3 August 1915, during the Second Battle of the Isonzo, the brigade renewed the attack, but failed to cross No man's land. The brigade then began to prepare for the Third Battle of the Isonzo, during which the attack against Podgora hill commenced on 18 October 1915. After four days of fighting the brigade had taken the first and second Austro-Hungarian trench lines and on 28 October the brigade began its attack on the third trench line. After another four days of fighting the Brigade "Casale" had finally taken the third enemy trench line. Afterwards the exhausted brigade remained in the conquered Austro-Hungarian positions, where it defeated two enemy counterattacks on 7 and 10 November. The next day, on 11 November 1915, the Brigade "Casale" began the attack on the fourth Austro-Hungarian trench line. After heavy fighting the Austro-Hungarian troops retreated to their fifth trench line, which the Brigade "Casale" attacked and took on 19 November. The next day the brigade attacked and took the sixth Austro-Hungarian trench line and now was just below the Austro-Hungarian summit positions of Podgora. However the Brigade "Casale", which had suffered 2,822 casualties in the preceding days, was too exhausted to continue the attack. At the end of the December 1915, the brigade was sent to the rear to be rebuilt.

The brigade returned to Podgora for the Sixth Battle of the Isonzo. On 6 August 1916, the 11th Infantry Regiment attacked the Austro-Hungarian summit positions and by evening of the next day the brigade had reached the shores of the Isonzo river. On 8 August, the 11th Infantry Regiment's I Battalion crossed the river and established a bridgehead on the left bank. The Austro-Hungarian troops then fell back to a new line in the hills to the East of Vrtojba, which the brigade attacked unsuccessfully during the Eighth Battle of the Isonzo and Ninth Battle of the Isonzo. For taking Podgora hill the two regiments of the Brigade "Casale" were both awarded Italy's highest military honor the Gold Medal of Military Valor. The two medals were affixed to the two regiments' flags and added to their coat of arms.

On 12 March 1917, the depot of the 11th Infantry Regiment in Forlì formed the 256th Infantry Regiment for the newly formed Brigade "Veneto". In May 1917, the brigade was sent to the Asiago plateau. On 24 October 1917, Austro-Hungarian forces, reinforced by German units, commenced the Battle of Caporetto. The German forces were able to break into the Italian front line at Caporetto and rout the Italian forces opposing them, which forced the Italian armies along the Isonzo river and in the Julian Alps to retreat behind the Piave river. The Brigade "Casale" remained unaffected by the events and continued to hold positions on the Western edge of the Asiago plateau at Monte Cengio and Cima Magnaboschi. The brigade remained in calm front sector until the end of the war, suffering only 210 casualties in 1917 and 206 in all of 1918.

=== Interwar years ===
In 1919, the 12th Infantry Regiment moved from Cesena to Pazin in the newly annexed Istria peninsula and in 1921 the regiment moved to the city of Trieste. On 28 October 1926, the Brigade "Casale" was disbanded and its two infantry regiments were renamed 11th Infantry Regiment "Casale" and 12th Infantry Regiment "Casale". On the same day the 11th Infantry Regiment "Casale" was assigned to the XVII Infantry Brigade, which also included the 27th Infantry Regiment "Pavia" and 28th Infantry Regiment "Pavia", while the 12th Infantry Regiment "Casale" was assigned to the XII Infantry Brigade, which also included the 151st Infantry Regiment "Sassari" and 152nd Infantry Regiment "Sassari". The XII Infantry Brigade was the infantry component of the 12th Territorial Division of Trieste, while the XVII Infantry Brigade was the infantry component of the 17th Territorial Division of Ravenna, which also included the 26th Field Artillery Regiment.

In 1934, the 17th Territorial Division of Ravenna changed its name to 17th Infantry Division "Rubicone". In 1935–36, the 11th Infantry Regiment "Casale" provided twelve officers and 817 troops to units deployed to East Africa for the Second Italo-Ethiopian War. On 24 May 1939, the 12th Infantry Regiment "Casale" in Trieste was renamed 73rd Infantry Regiment "Lombardia" and on the same day the 12th Infantry Regiment "Casale" was reformed in its traditional base in Cesena. On 15 June 1939, the 11th Infantry Regiment "Casale" and 12th Infantry Regiment "Casale" were assigned to the newly formed 56th Infantry Division "Casale". On 1 September 1939, the 56th Artillery Regiment "Casale" was reformed in Rimini and assigned to the division.

=== World War II ===
At the outbreak of World War II, the 11th Infantry Regiment "Casale" consisted of a command, a command company, three fusilier battalions, a support weapons battery equipped with 65/17 infantry support guns, and a mortar company equipped with 81mm Mod. 35 mortars. On 14 March 1941, the "Casale" division left Italy for Albania to reinforce the failing Italian Spring Offensive during the Greco-Italian War. After arriving in Albania the division immediately entered the front in the Shushicë valley. By 20 March 1941, the division was assigned to the XXV Army Corps and fought in the Tepelenë area. Soon after the start of the Battle of Greece on 6 April 1941, contact with retreating Greek forces was lost and the "Casale" division engaged in a cautious advance along the Drin river. On 18 April 1941, the division's forces encountered a Greek rearguard at Lumi i Kardhiqit. On 19 April 1941, the division had arrived in Gjirokastër. On 22 April 1941, the division reached the Greek border near Delvinaki, where it encountered Wehrmacht patrols. Afterwards the division was used for mopping-up operations in Greece in the area of Zitsa, Negrades, and Paramythia. After this task was completed the "Casale" division moved to Aetolia-Acarnania and established garrisons in Agrinio, Amfilochia and Missolonghi.

For their conduct during the Italian advance from 18 to 22 April 1941, the 11th Infantry Regiment "Casale" and 12th Infantry Regiment "Casale" were both awarded a War Cross of Military Valor, which were affixed to flags of the two regiments. On 20 September 1941, the depot of the 12th Infantry Regiment "Casale" in Cesena reformed the 122nd Infantry Regiment "Macerata" and on 15 October 1941, the depot of the 11th Infantry Regiment "Casale" in Forlì reformed the 121st Infantry Regiment "Macerata". On 1 December 1941, the two reformed regiments were assigned to the newly formed 153rd Infantry Division "Macerata". On 1 November 1941, the depot of the 28th Infantry Regiment "Pavia" in Ravenna formed the 311th Infantry Regiment "Casale", which was originally destined to join the "Casale" division in Greece. However the newly formed regiment was sent to reinforce Italian occupation units in Slovenia.

On 8 September 1943, the Armistice of Cassibile was announced and the 56th Infantry Division "Casale", which was still on garrison duty in Aetolia-Acarnania in Greece, was soon afterwards disbanded by invading German forces, while parts of the 11th Infantry Regiment "Casale" abandoned their positions and joined Greek partisan forces.

=== Cold War ===
On 1 July 1958, the 11th Infantry Regiment "Casale" was reformed by renaming the existing 1st Recruits Training Center in Casale Monferrato. The regiment consisted of the following units:

- 11th Infantry Regiment "Casale", in Casale Monferrato
  - Command Company
  - I Battalion
  - II Battalion
  - III Battalion
  - IV Battalion, in Cuneo

On 1 March 1962, the detached IV Battalion in Cuneo became an autonomous unit and left the regiment. On 31 October 1974, the 11th Infantry Regiment "Casale" was disbanded. The next day the regiment's I Battalion became an autonomous unit and was renamed Recruits Training Battalion "Casale". The battalion was assigned the regiment's name and traditions, and received the regiment's flag for safekeeping.

During the 1975 army reform the army disbanded the regimental level and newly independent battalions were granted for the first time their own flags. On 15 November 1975, the Recruits Training Battalion "Casale" was renamed 11th Infantry Battalion "Casale". The battalion was tasked with training recruits destined for the Mechanized Division "Mantova". On 12 November 1976, the President of the Italian Republic Giovanni Leone assigned with decree 846 the flag and traditions of the 11th Infantry Regiment "Casale" to the 11th Infantry Battalion "Casale".

In 1986, the Italian Army abolished the divisional level and brigades, which until then had been under one of the Army's four divisions, came under direct command of the Army's 3rd Army Corps or 5th Army Corps. On 30 September 1986, the Mechanized Division "Mantova" was disbanded and the next day the 11th Infantry Battalion "Casale" was assigned to the Northwestern Military Region.

=== Recent times ===
In 1992, the 11th Infantry Battalion "Casale" was renamed 11th Battalion "Casale". In 1997, the battalion was assigned to the 1st Defence Forces Command. On 22 January 1999, the battalion was disbanded and the flag of the 11th Infantry Regiment "Casale" transferred to the Shrine of the Flags in the Vittoriano in Rome.
