= Louis René Vialy =

French painter

Louis-René Vialy
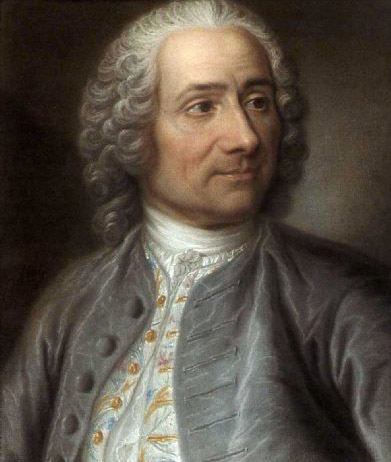
- Presumed self-portrait of Vialy.
- Born: Vialy; 1680; Aix-en-Provence, France
- Died: 17 February 1770 (aged 89–90); Paris, France
- Known for: painting
- Movement: Classicism

Louis-René Vialy (1680 – 17 February 1770), also spelled Vially, Viali or Viallis, was a French painter.

== Life ==
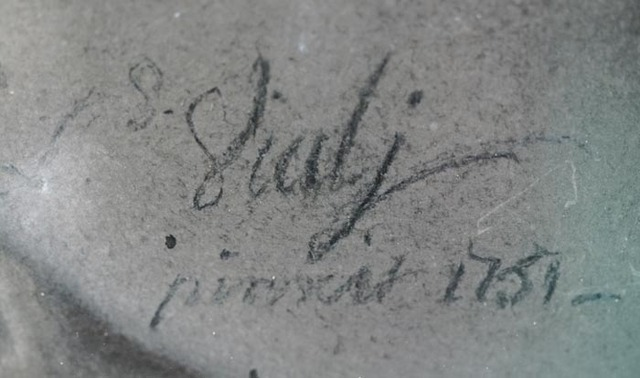
Signature of Vialy (1751)

The son of Jacques Vialy, a Sicilian painter born at Trapani but who moved to Provence, Louis-René Vialy was born at Aix-en-Provence. He began his career decorating sedan chairs, as attested by Mariette, who wrote that "it was a very popular taste in Provence to have ornamented sedan chairs". His father was naturalised as a French subject by letters registered at the cour des comptes of Aix-en-Provence in 1720 and died in Aix on 25 December 1745 aged 95. He was buried the following day in the old parish church of La Madeleine, beside Jean-Baptiste van Loo who had died on 29 September the same year.

Louis-René at first studied under his father and very often attended the Vernets' studio – Antoine Vernet, decorative painter, was a family friend of Louis's father. Louis-René is normally named as the tutor of the young marine painter Joseph Vernet but this was actually Jacques. Louis-René in 1752 painted a pastel portrait of Vernet and owned several paintings by him, such as the two exhibited at the Salon of 1757. Mariette also cites him as tutor to the engraver Jean-Joseph Balechou.

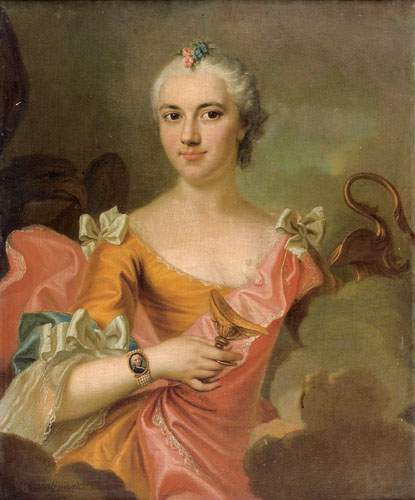
Portrait of a woman dressed as Hebe (1753)

Vialy seems to have set himself up in Paris around 1750, in rue d’Argenteuil, behind the Church of Saint-Roch. His style as a portrait painter influenced and was influenced by the salons of the Académie Royale de Saint-Luc, where he exhibited in 1752, 1753 and 1756 with the titles "peintre du Roi" and member of Académie de Saint-Luc. At first, however, he worked for the famous portraitist Hyacinthe Rigaud, in whose studio he was found in 1712 and in 1714 under the name "Vial". He was then only 32. This trip does not seem today to be apocryphal, for relationships are known between the Catalan painter and the Van Loo family, during his trip to Lyons then to Paris. On his death, Louis-René Vialy was still on rue des Aveugles, in the parish of Saint Sulpice, above a barber's shop.

== Style ==
Vialy seems to have mainly worked in pastel, though some works by him in oil on canvas are known. In his Dictionnaire des Pastellistes, Neil Jeffarès describes the images created by Vialy as "easily recognizable: not very expressive like those by Allais, they are distinguished by a certain sweetness. [...] The eyes are liquid with the light of oils in the white point quite high to the left. He had a distinctive treatment of fabrics with tight folds and reflections". Vialy's pastel technique corresponded to the taste of his time, inheriting his attitudes to 3/4 length portraits from his contemporaries and from Louis Vigée. In contrast, his canvases adopt poses which owe a clear debt to Rigaud, such as his Portrait of a woman as Hebe (sold in 2007), and other artists. This is notably the case in his portrait of the regent, after the 1717 painting of him by Jean-Baptiste Santerre, of which one copy is now held at the Prado in Madrid.

== Works ==
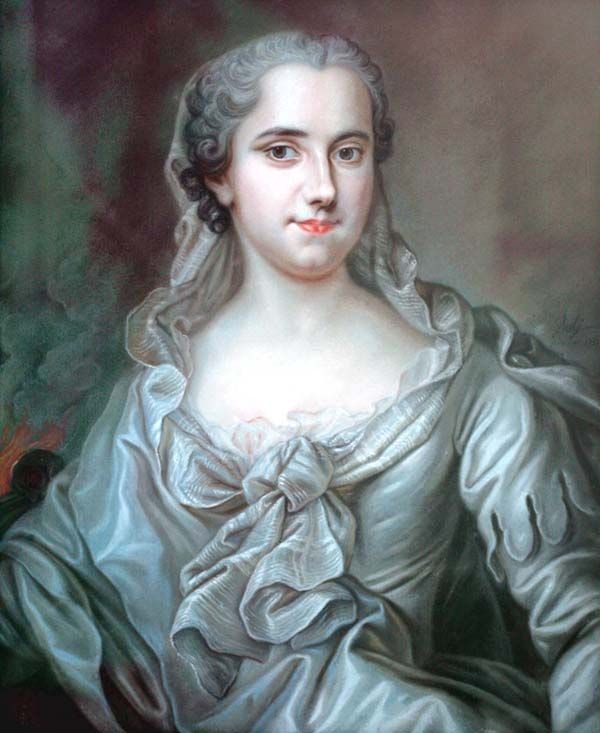
Angélique-Louise La Rochefoucauld vicomtesse de Vence as a Vestal Virgin (1751)

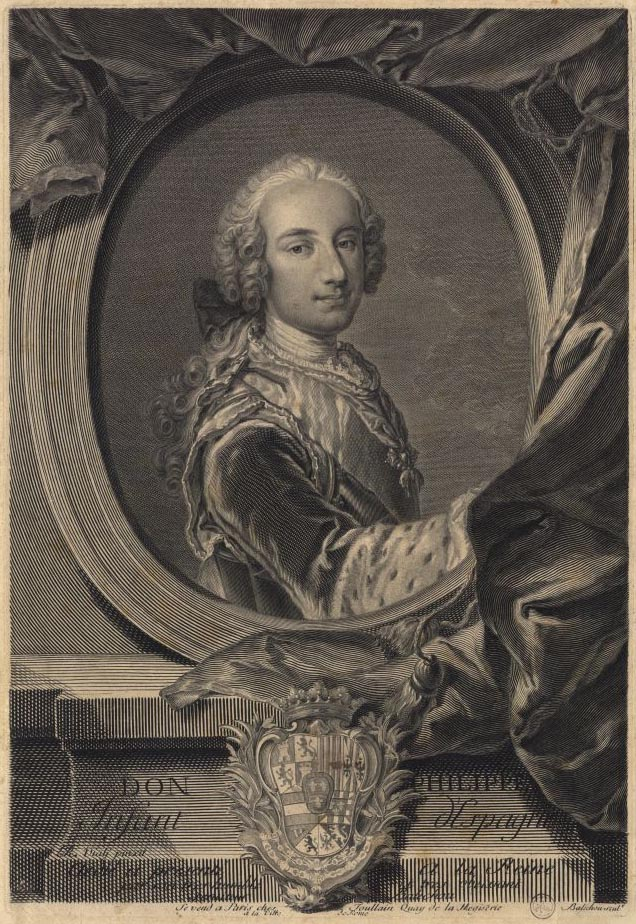
Don Philipp, infante of Spain, engraved by Jean-Joseph Balechou (1740)

Vialy mainly exhibited at the Salons of the Académie de Saint-Luc

=== 1752 Salon ===
  - 230. Portrait of M. le Comte de Vence, Colonel of the Régiment Royal Corse, Maréchal de Camp of His Majesty's Armies.
  - 231. Portrait of Angélique-Louise La Rochefoucauld (1733–1794), vicomtesse de Vence as a Vestal Virgin. Pastel, 49 x 59 cm. Signed "Vialj / pinxit 1751 - ". Sold in Paris, Pascal Blouet, 26 February 2006, lot 15.
  - 232. Portrait of M. Duriny, His Holiness’ Nuncio to the Court of France.
  - 233. Portrait of M. le Comte de Bonneval, pasha (entitled to three tails), Governor of Karaman.
  - 234. Portrait of M.***
  - 235. Portrait of M. de***
  - 236. Portrait of Mademoiselle*** as a Muse, with all the attributes of Melpomene and Thalia, sitting at the foot of Mount Parnassus

=== 1753 Salon ===
  - 133. Portrait of Dom Philippe, Infante of Spain, Duke of Parma.
  - 134. Portrait of M. le Chevalier de Perrin.
  - 135. Portrait of M. Danthoine, Treasurer & [premier] Écuyer to Madame the Infanta, Duchess of Parma.
  - 136. Portrait of M. Duchesneau, Knight of the Ordre Hospitalier de Saint-Lazare.
  - 137. Portrait of M. Desilant.
  - 138. Portrait of M. Destourettes, Agent of the Town of Avignon.
  - 139. Portraits of M. Franque, Architect of the Hôtel Royal des Invalides and his wife.
  - 140. Portrait of M. Hemmery.
  - 141. Double Portraits of Mme de Torram, and her brother. Portrait of Mademoiselle ***, dressed as an ancient Greek

=== 1756 Salon ===
  - 87. Three sketches of mythological scenes. The first shows Diana surprising the sleeping shepherd Endymion; the second shows Clytie's metamorphoses into a sunflower; the third shows Vulcan and Venus in the Forges of Lemnos, with the Cyclopes forging Achilles' weapons; canvas of 20.
  - 88. Four paintings of seascapes, landscapes and four historic scenes, figures and animals. The seascape shows sunset; a vessel entering a port, with others at anchor; other buildings, ships, barks and chalops, figures of different nations on the quay and shores. All these make up canvas of 40.
  - 89. Two high paintings, canvas of 20.
  - 90. Seascape with sunrise, canvas of 8, made for the cabinet of M. le Comte de Vance.
  - 91. Portrait of Madame la Duchesse de Lauraguay, dressed as a Cordelière, in pastel, canvas of 20.
  - 92. Six small paintings of seascapes and landscapes, one of sunrise, the others of sunset, and a clair de Lune, all with figures; canvas of 8, 6 & 4.
  - 93. M. le Cardinal d'Uriny, former Nuncio to France, pastel on canvas of 12.
  - 94. Portrait of Madame la Comtesse de la Guiche, as a Naiad, oils, canvas of 25.
  - 95. Annibal Camoux, born 1638, in oils from life, at Marseille, aged 112 years [sic], now 118 years, as fresh and well as he is shown in his Portrait. Part of these paintings belong to the painter.
  - 96. A Painting for M. le Comte de Vance, showing a Sea Fort with several Figures, with the Sun appearing to set in the Sea, canvas of 8.

=== Other ===
- Portrait of Philippe d’Orléans, Regent of France. Oil on canvas, 133 x 90 cm. Signed and dated bottom right "fecit par R. Vialy 1718".
- Portrait of a young woman as Hebe. Oil on canvas, 67 x 55 cm. Signed and dated bottom left "L. R. Vialj pinxit / 1753". Sold in Paris, hôtel Drouot, Piasa, 22 June 2007, lot. 97.
- Presumed portrait of madame de Musset. Pastel, 58,5 x 47,5 cm. Signed and dated 1751 bottom right. Sold in Paris, hôtel Drouot, 17 June 2005, lot. 80.
- Portrait of a man in blue, called Self-portrait (Neil Jeffarès). Pastel, 46 x 38 cm. Signed and dated bottom left : « Vialy pinxit 1742 ». Auctioned in Lille, Mercier & Cie, 15 December 2001, lot. 358 (not bought); sold in Paris, May Duhamel & Associés, 6 June 2004, lot. 296.
- Portrait of Joseph Vernet, painter. Pastel, dated and signed "L. R. Vialj / pinxit / 1752". Paris, musée de la marine.

== Bibliography ==
- (in French) Roger-Armand Weigert, « Testament 19 août 1767 et inventaire après décès de Louis-René Vialy: Louis-René Vialy », in the Bulletin de la Société de l'Histoire de l'Art Français, Paris, 1931, pp. 146–58 (Archives Nationales, vol. LXV, 13 mars 1770).
- (in French) Roux Alphéran, Les rues d’Aix ou recherches historiques sur l’ancienne capitale de Provence par Roux-Alpheran, Aix, 1846.
- (in French) Neil Jeffares, Dictionary of Pastellists Before 1800, Unicorn, 2006, p. 338.
- (in French) Léon Lagrange, Joseph Vernet et la peinture au XVIIe siècle : Avec le texte des Livres de raison, et un grand nombre de documents inédits, Paris, Didier, 1864.
- (in French) J. Guiffrey, Livrets des expositions de l’Académie de Saint-Luc à Paris, pendant les années 1751, 1752, 1753, 1756, 1762, 1764 et 1774, avec une notice bibliographique et une table, Paris, Baur et Détaille, 1872.
