= Annus mirabilis =

Latin phrase referring to several years during which events of major importance occurred

Annus mirabilis (pl. anni mirabiles) is a Latin phrase that means "year of miracles", "marvelous year", "wonderful year", or "miraculous year". This term has been used to refer to several years during which events of major importance are remembered, notably Isaac Newton's discoveries in 1665–1666 at the age of 23, and Albert Einstein's papers published in 1905 at the age of 26. The opposite of this concept is an annus horribilis.

== 1345–1346 – Edward III ==
Eight years after the start of the Hundred Years' War, large-scale fighting had died down. Edward III of England decided to renew the war more vigorously in 1345. He despatched a small force to Gascony in southwest France under Henry, Earl of Derby and personally led the main English army to northern France. Edward delayed disembarkation of his army and his fleet was scattered by a storm, rendering this offensive ineffective. Derby was spectacularly successful, winning victories at Bergerac and Auberoche. The following spring, a large French army, led by the heir to the French throne, John, Duke of Normandy, counter-attacked Derby's forces.

Edward responded by landing an army of 10,000 men in northern Normandy. The English devastated much of Normandy and stormed and sacked Caen, slaughtering the population. They cut a swath along the left bank of the Seine to within 20 miles (32 km) of Paris. The English army then turned north and inflicted a heavy defeat on a French army led by their king, Philip VI, at the Battle of Crécy on 26 August 1346. They promptly exploited this by laying siege to Calais. The period from Derby's victory outside Bergerac in late August 1345 to the start of the siege of Calais on 4 September 1346 became known as Edward III's annus mirabilis.

== 1492 – Catholic Monarchs ==
In January 1492, Isabella I and Ferdinand II, the Catholic Monarchs of Spain, completed the conquest of Granada, concluding the centuries-long Reconquista and ending Muslim rule of the Iberian Peninsula. Later that year, they would sponsor Christopher Columbus's first voyage across the Atlantic, resulting in the first arrival of Europeans on the Americas on 12 October.

That same year, Antonio de Nebrija published his monumental grammar of Spanish, Gramática de la lengua castellana. It is notable as the first work to focus on the grammar of a modern Western European language other than Latin.

== 1543 – The year of science ==
In 1543, Nicolaus Copernicus published De revolutionibus orbium coelestium, outlining his heliocentric model of the universe. This event is traditionally held to be the beginning of the wider Scientific Revolution, which saw the emergence of modern science in Europe. Andreas Vesalius also published his De humani corporis fabrica in 1543, revolutionizing the science of anatomy and the practice of medicine.

== 1625 – Spanish monarchy ==
During the course of [1625] Breda surrendered to the Army of Flanders under the command of the incomparable Spinola; the republic of Genoa, Spain's ally and client, was rescued from the onslaught of the combined forces of France and Savoy; a joint Spanish-Portuguese naval expedition drove the Dutch from Bahia in Brazil; and an English expeditionary force was humiliatingly defeated when it attempted an attack on Cadiz.

— Geoffrey Parker, The Thirty Years' War

A series of Spanish military victories on a global strategic scale obtained in 1625 during the Thirty Years' War, in important military theaters in Europe and America. These military victories were as follows: Siege of Breda, Relief of Genoa, Recapture of Bahia, Battle of San Juan and Defense of Cádiz. Those military actions were immortalized in a series of paintings in the Hall of Realms of the Buen Retiro Palace in Madrid. Thus, the "reputational" policy promoted by Gaspar de Guzmán, Count-Duke of Olivares, favourite of Philip IV of Spain, was apparently confirmed by the initial success, and it was in reference to this annus mirabilis for Spanish arms that Olivares delivered probably his most famous pronouncement: "God is Spanish and fights for Spain."

== 1644–1645 – Montrose ==
The military successes of James Graham, 1st Marquess of Montrose in Scotland in the War of the Three Kingdoms during 1644–1645 are sometimes called annus mirabilis.

== 1665–1666 – The year of wonders ==
In 1665 to 1666, Isaac Newton, aged 23, made revolutionary inventions and discoveries in calculus, motion, optics and gravitation. It was in this year that Newton was alleged to have observed an apple falling from a tree (Newton's apple), and in which he, in any case, hit upon the law of universal gravitation. He was afforded the time to work on his theories due to the closure of Cambridge University by an outbreak of the plague. He stated and proved the binomial theorem, discovered calculus, formulated the universal law of gravitation, and developed a theory of color.

== 1706 – Grand Alliance ==
In 1706, the Grand Alliance arrayed against Louis XIV of France won resounding victories (the Battle of Ramillies and Siege of Turin) which, after the previous year's failures, has been termed by James Falkner as a "Year of Miracles."

== 1759 – William Pitt ==
A series of victories by the British armed forces in 1759 in North America, Europe, India, and in various naval engagements caused that year to be referred to, on occasion, as William Pitt's annus mirabilis. It was the turning point of the Seven Years' War.

== 1871 – W. G. Grace ==
According to Harry Altham, 1871 was W. G. Grace's annus mirabilis. In all first-class matches in 1871, a total of 17 centuries were scored and Grace accounted for 10 of them, including the first century in a first-class match at Trent Bridge. He averaged 78.25 and the next-best average by a batsman playing more than a single innings was 39.57, barely more than half his figure. His aggregate for the season was 2,739 runs and this was the first time that anyone had scored 2,000 first-class runs in a season; Harry Jupp was next best with 1,068. Grace produced his season's highlight in the South v North match at The Oval when he made his highest career score to date of 268.

== 1905 – Albert Einstein ==
It was in this year that Albert Einstein, aged 26, published important discoveries concerning the photoelectric effect, Brownian motion, the special theory of relativity, and the famous E = mc^{2} equation. His four articles, collectively known as his Annus Mirabilis papers, were published in Annalen der Physik in 1905.

== 1939 – Hollywood's Golden Year ==
1939 is considered the annus mirabilis of Hollywood due to the surprising number of movies released that year that are considered "classics" or foundational of their genre. Some of the films released in 1939 include: The Wizard of Oz, Gone with the Wind, Gunga Din, Beau Geste, Union Pacific, The Roaring Twenties, Only Angels Have Wings, At the Circus, Stagecoach, Mr. Smith Goes to Washington, Ninotchka, Destry Rides Again, Midnight, Wuthering Heights, Young Mr. Lincoln, among many others.

== 2016–17 – Comebacks in sports ==
Between May 2016 and March 2017, the world of sports witnessed the largest comebacks in the history of NBA Finals, World Series, Super Bowl, and UEFA Champions League. In June 2016, LeBron James's Cleveland Cavaliers became the first team in NBA Finals history to overcome a 3–1 deficit, thus beating a Golden State Warriors side that was coming off a record-breaking league-best record of 73–9. In November 2016, the Chicago Cubs overcame a 3-1 deficit to win their franchise's first World Series since 1908. In February 2017, Tom Brady's New England Patriots became the first team in Super Bowl history to overcome a 25 point deficit, doing so in the third quarter to beat the Atlanta Falcons 34–28. In the following month, on 8 March 2017, Luis Suárez, Lionel Messi, and Neymar led FC Barcelona to become the first team in Champions League history to overcome a first leg four-goal deficit to beat PSG 6–5 on aggregate. The latter two became known as 28–3 and la Remontada. Also in association football, Leicester City won the Premier League at an incredible 5000-1 odds and being in 14th place in the Championship the previous season. It is regarded as one of the biggest upsets in sporting history.

== Annus mirabilis of births ==
- 1963 saw the birth of four future NBA MVPs: Michael Jordan, Charles Barkley, Hakeem Olajuwon, and Karl Malone, the most out of any year.
- 1972 saw the birth of four future Ballon d'Or winners: Zinedine Zidane, Rivaldo, Luís Figo, and Pavel Nedvěd. This is the most number of winners of the prestigious world football prize born in a year, whereas the average maximum is two.

== See also ==
- Annus mirabilis (Norway)
- Annus Mirabilis (poem)
- Annus horribilis
- List of Latin phrases

== Bibliography ==
- Blanning, T.C.W.The Culture of Power the Power of Culture: Old Regime Europe 1660–1789. Oxford University Press, 2002.
- Burne, Alfred (1999) [1955]. The Crécy War. Ware, Hertfordshire: Wordsworth Editions. ISBN 978-1-84022-210-4.
- DeVries, Kelly (1998) [1996]. Infantry Warfare in the Early Fourteenth Century: Discipline, Tactics, and Technology. Woodbridge, Suffolk; Rochester, New York: Boydell Press. ISBN 978-0-85115-571-5.
- Lambert, Craig (2011). "Edward III's Siege of Calais: A Reappraisal". Journal of Medieval History. 37 (3): 245–256. doi:10.1016/j.jmedhist.2011.05.002. ISSN 0304-4181. S2CID 159935247.
- Monod, Paul Kléber. Imperial Island: A History of Britain and Its Empire, 1660–1837. Wiley-Blackwell, 2009.
- Parker, Geoffrey (1984). Europe in crisis, 1598-1648. London: Fontana Press. ISBN 9780006356707.
- Prestwich, M. (13 September 2007). J.M. Roberts (ed.). Plantagenet England 1225–1360. Oxford: Oxford University Press. ISBN 978-0-19-922687-0.
- Rogers, Clifford (2004). Bachrach, Bernard S; DeVries, Kelly; Rogers, Clifford J (eds.). "The Bergerac Campaign (1345) and the Generalship of Henry of Lancaster". Journal of Medieval Military History. II. Woodbridge, Suffolk: Boydell Press. ISBN 978-1-84383-040-5. ISSN 0961-7582.
- Sumption, Jonathan (1990). Trial by Battle. The Hundred Years' War. Vol. I. London: Faber and Faber. ISBN 978-0-571-20095-5.
- Altham, H. S. (1962). A History of Cricket, Volume 1 (to 1914). George Allen & Unwin.
- Rae, Simon (1998). W. G. Grace: A Life. Faber & Faber. ISBN 978-0-571-17855-1.
