= Battle of Madonna dell'Olmo =

1744 battle during the War of the Austrian Succession

- Part of the War of the Austrian Succession
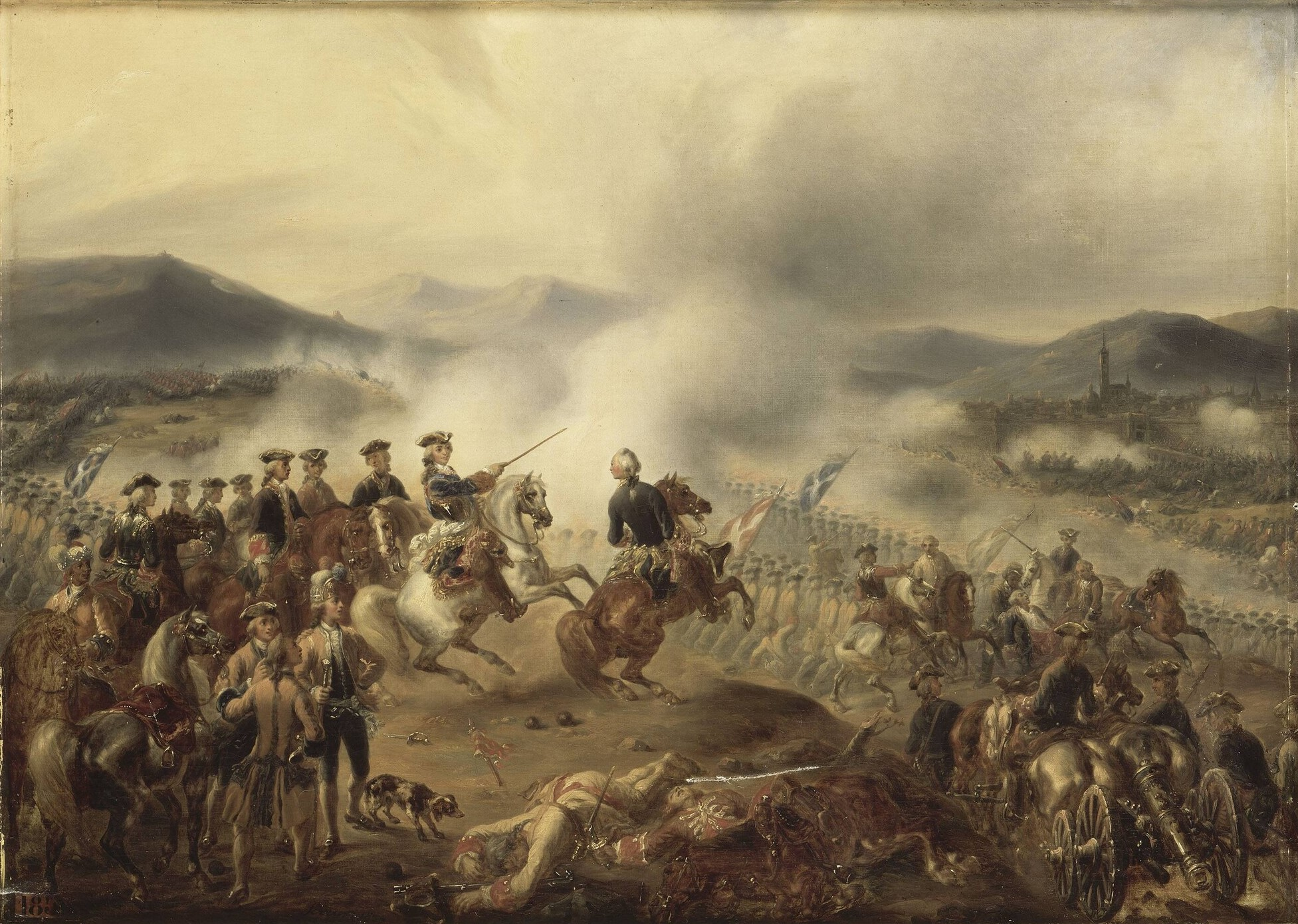
- The Prince of Conti at the Battle of Cuneo, 30 September 1744 by Henri Serrur, 1837
Date	30 September 1744
Location	Cuneo, Piedmont (present-day Italy)
Result	Franco-Spanish victory

Belligerents
Spain; France	(Kingdom of Sardinia) Sardinia; Austria

Commanders and leaders
(Spain) Infante Philip (Spain) Marquess of la Mina (Kingdom of France) Prince of Conti	(Kingdom of Sardinia) Charles Emmanuel III (Kingdom of Sardinia) Karl Sigmund Friedrich Wilhelm von Leutrum

Strength
c. 33,700	c. 28,000–36,000

Casualties and losses
2,700 dead or wounded	4,000–4,400 dead, wounded or captured

The Battle of Madonna dell'Olmo or Battle of Cuneo was fought on the outskirts of Cuneo on 30 September 1744, during the War of the Austrian Succession. The battle ended in a victory for the armies of Spain and France over the Kingdom of Sardinia but it did not advance the victors' campaign.

== Prelude ==
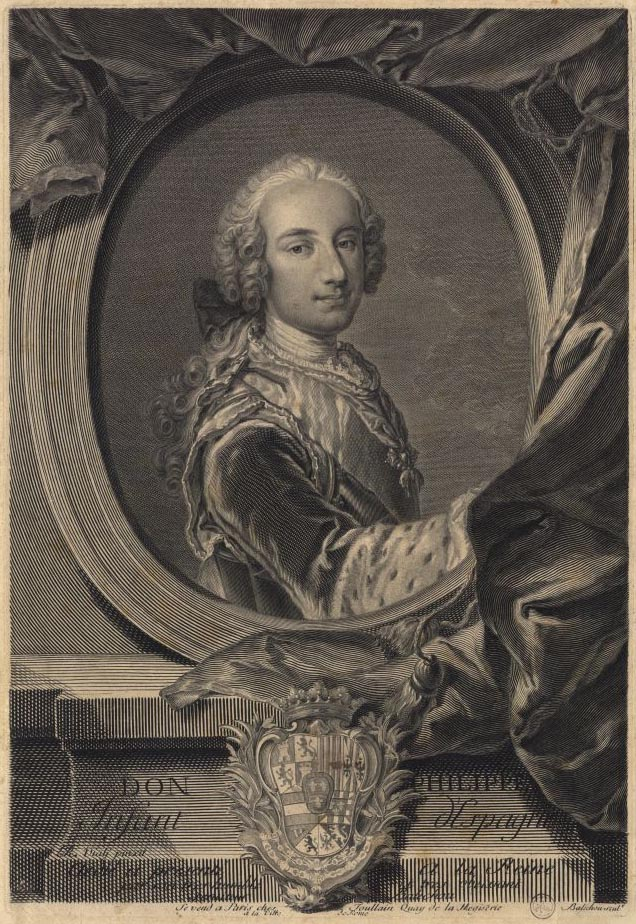
Infante Philip of Spain by Louis René Vialy

The battle of Cuneo was brought about by a difference in Franco-Spanish policy during the middle part of 1744. Spain wished for an advance along the coast of Italy through Genoa to occupy the lands around Parma, which it already had been decided were going to be the future realm of Infante Philip, the third son of King Philip V of Spain and his wife, Elisabeth Farnese. The chief aim of France was to humble Piedmont-Sardinia and to force her to detach herself from Austria, or better yet, force her to drop out of the war entirely. The French commander, the Prince of Conti, would not accept the Spanish plan of attack because he thought it was unsound, while the Spanish queen would brook no opposition to what she believed should be the key thrust of the joint Bourbon armies. In the end, a compromise was negotiated. Spain's plan was not to be followed until after the humbling of Piedmont-Sardinia, after which the joint armies would march into Lombardy to secure the Infante Philip his new realm.

== Franco-Spanish advance to Cuneo ==
The principal plan for invading Piedmont was devised by Lt-Gen Pierre Joseph de Bourcet, who was France's leading expert in alpine warfare. The main problem for any army invading Piedmont was the problem of surmounting the alpine passes that guarded its approaches. Even a small number of defenders could effectively block an advance. De Bourcet's reasoning was that with a numerical superiority of 33,000 to 25,000 the best result would be obtained by separating the attacking force into several columns, which would then attack outlying outposts in a multi-pronged advance. Using infiltration tactics, it would be easy to envelop the Piedmontese positions, allowing attacks to be launched where most unexpected. Finally, by putting pressure along the whole front it was reasoned that the Piedmontese defence perimeter would crack at some point, and then the columns could re-unite and push through the gap.

With this in mind, the Franco-Spanish army began to regroup in the Dauphiné region in June. Once concentrated, the attacking columns lay on a front between Briançon and St. Etienne. On 5 July the Franco-Spanish army broke camp and headed in nine separate columns towards the heart of Piedmont. Despite bickering between Conti and La Mina, the Franco-Spanish army experienced several early triumphs. Entering the Stura valley, the route passed through a 6 m defile known as the Barricades. Following De Bourcet's advice, troops to the north and south of the position emerged throughout the mountains onto the rear of the Piedmont position, and rather than being caught in a trap the Piedmontese evacuated the valley without a fight. In accordance with instructions, the Franco-Spanish army now converged on the Stura Valley in order to take advantage of the gap in Charles Emmanuel's defences.

The Franco-Spanish army triumphed again on 19 July when it won the Battle of Casteldelfino; to cap it all, the town of Demonte, the last outpost before Cuneo, surrendered to Conti on 17 August 1744.

== Siege of Cuneo ==
With King Frederick of Prussia advancing into Bohemia, Charles Emmanuel knew that the bulk of the troops needed for the defence of Cuneo would have to come from his own domains. With that in mind he held back his army of 25,000 near Saluzzo to await developments. To safeguard Cuneo he appointed Major-General Karl Sigmund Friedrich Wilhelm von Leutrum – who had performed well at Campo Santo – to command the garrison, and called out the kingdom's militia, which could act as a superb guerrilla force.

The siege of Cuneo began on the night of 12/13 September. Conti's plan involved three armies - one to besiege, one to oppose Charles Emmanuel's Army and another to patrol the surrounding lands. Although Leutrum showed great ingenuity – lighting the sky to illuminate the trenches for his cannon and continuously mounting sorties – by 28 September Conti's army was closing in on the fortress. It was at this point that the King of Sardinia decided to act.

== Charles Emmanuel's plan ==
Charles Emmanuel had already decided that with his opponents' numerical superiority, a more ambitious plan was needed to relieve Cuneo. With this in mind the King proposed five separate aims for his army:

1. A pitched battle with the Franco-Spanish army.
2. To send in supplies to Cuneo and evacuate the wounded.
3. To attack Bourbon outposts around Cuneo.
4. For Leutrum to lead a sortie to destroy the siege works east of the Gesso river.
5. For his militia to attack the Franco-Spanish lines of communication in the Stura Valley.

The brilliance of this plan was that as long as the first aim kept Conti and La Mina preoccupied with the main Sardinian army and completely unaware of the other four aims, then the King would not need to win the coming battle. With the other aims fulfilled and winter and the snow closing in, the French and Spanish would be forced to disengage from the siege and retreat into France. The King of Sardinia was playing for time.

== Battle ==
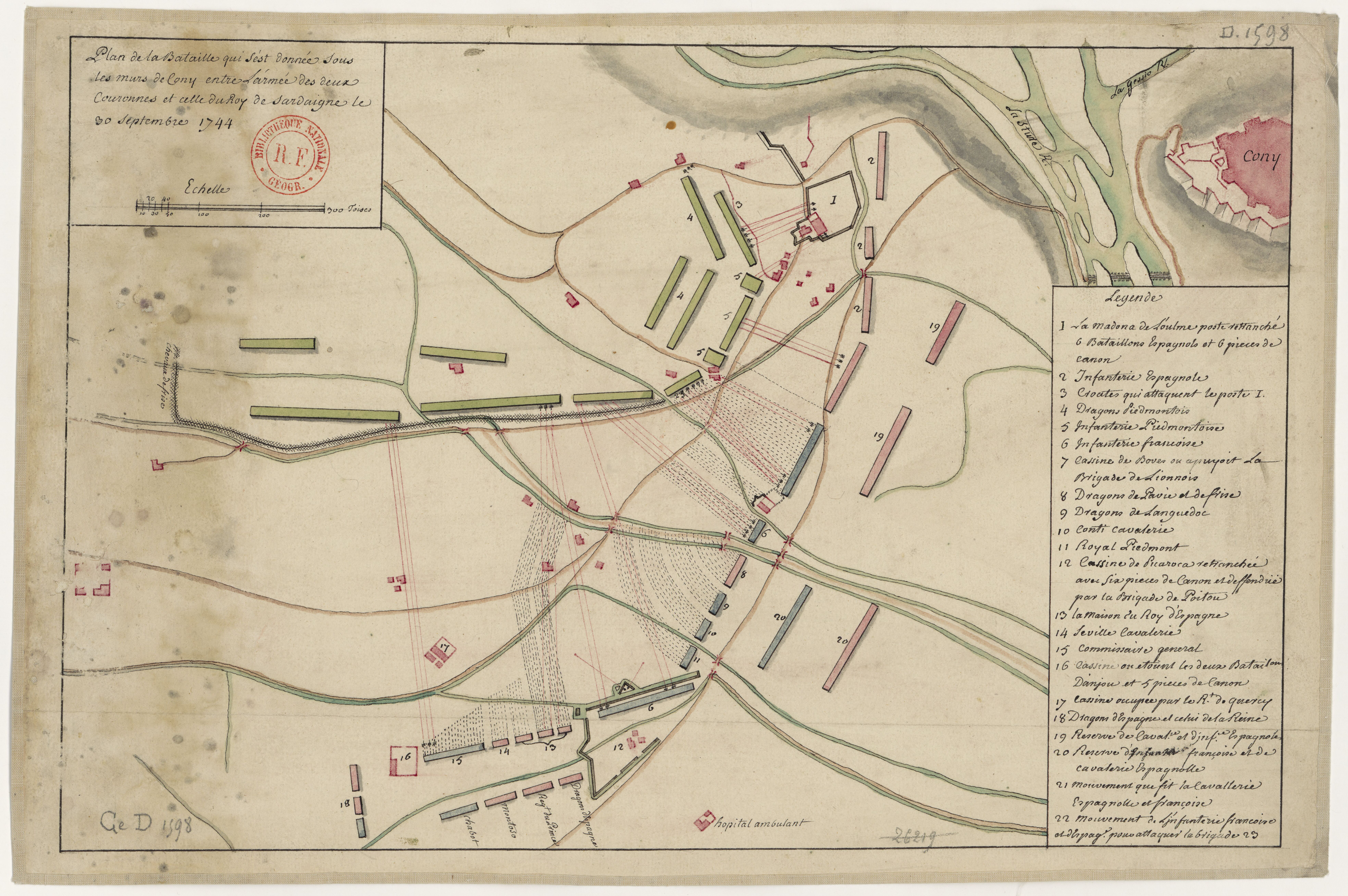
Plan of the Battle of Cuneo, 1744 (Bibliothèque nationale de France)

Late in September, Charles Emmanuel advanced his army from Saluzzo towards Cuneo while at the same time Conti moved his army towards the Piedmontese. By the close of day on September 29, Conti occupied a position between Caraglio and Madonna dell'Olmo, whilst on the morning of 30 September Charles Emmanuel moved his army into position opposite Conti's.

The engagement began around noon when the Croats (on loan from Austria) in the Sardinian army charged towards Madonna dell'Olmo. The Croat attack, however, was repulsed by the Spanish and even Charles Emmanuel's grenadiers could make no headway. On the opposite flank the French could not get to grips with the Piedmontese because of a ditch and some barricades barring the way. In the centre, however, Conti made excellent use of his artillery, which provided cover for a French infantry attack. The battle for the centre lay in the balance until Charles Emmanuel, realising that he would not be able to capture Madonna dell'Olmo, ordered an orderly retreat. By nightfall the two armies had disengaged.

The King of Sardinia had lost 4,000–4,400 men, whilst the Bourbon losses were 2,700–4,000 men killed or wounded. Other accounts give 3,000 losses for the Spanish and 5,000 for the French.

== Aftermath ==
Although victory had gone to the Franco-Spanish army, it became apparent that evening that Charles Emmanuel's brilliantly conceived plan had fulfilled most of its objectives. Although the Bourbon outposts around Cuneo were intact, the siege works had been destroyed, the garrison re-supplied and reinforced, and Conti's communications had been cut. Moreover, 15,000 men had been lost to Sardinian enemy actions, sickness and desertion at Cuneo. Further problems followed when it began to rain on the first of October, the trenches flooded and roads were wiped out. At a council of war on 11 October it was decided that with winter approaching and the Franco-Spanish Army even further from their goal, the army should retreat before the winter snows closed the passes behind them. By 19 November the Franco-Spanish army had recrossed the Alps. On 20 November it began to snow.
