= Jean-Joseph Balechou =

French engraver

Jean-Joseph Balechou (Arles, Provence 11 July 1715 - Avignon, 18 August 1765) was a French engraver.

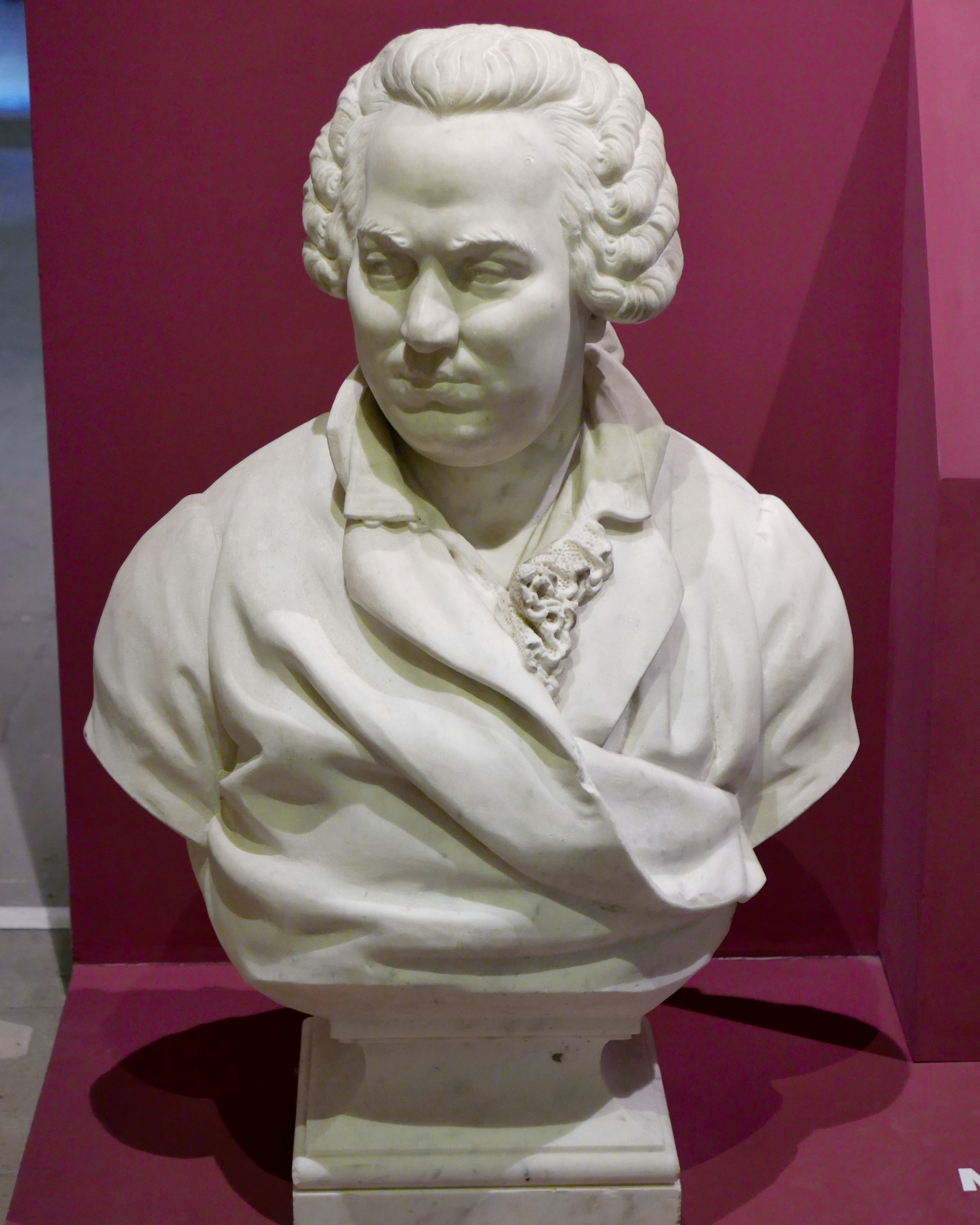
Balechou by Guillaume Marius Dieudonné (Réattu museum)

== Works ==
- Portrait of Augustus, king of Poland after Hyacinthe Rigaud
- Portrait of Dom Philippe, infant of Spain after Louis René Vialy
- Portrait of Charles Rollin after Charles Antoine Coypel
- Portrait of Gabriel Grillot, abbé de Pontigny after Louis Autreau
- Portrait of Heinrich von Brühl after Louis de Silvestre
- Portrait of Jean Varin after Claude Lefebvre
- Portrait of Louise-Elisabeth of France, infante of Parma after Jean-Marc Nattier
- The Bathers
- The Calm
- The Tempest, after Claude Joseph Vernet
- Sainte-Geneviève, after Charles Amédée Philippe van Loo

== Gallery ==
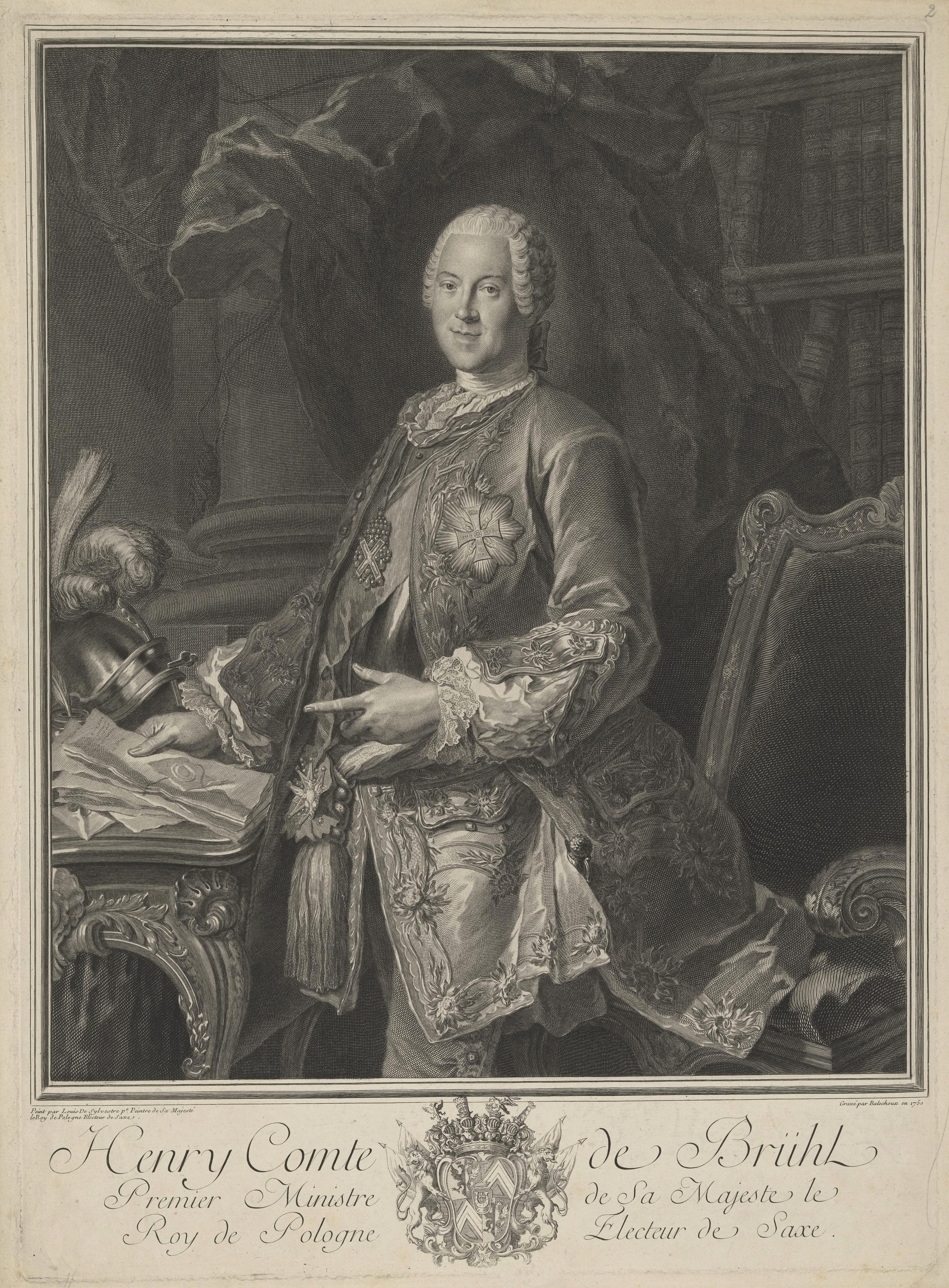
Heinrich von Brühl

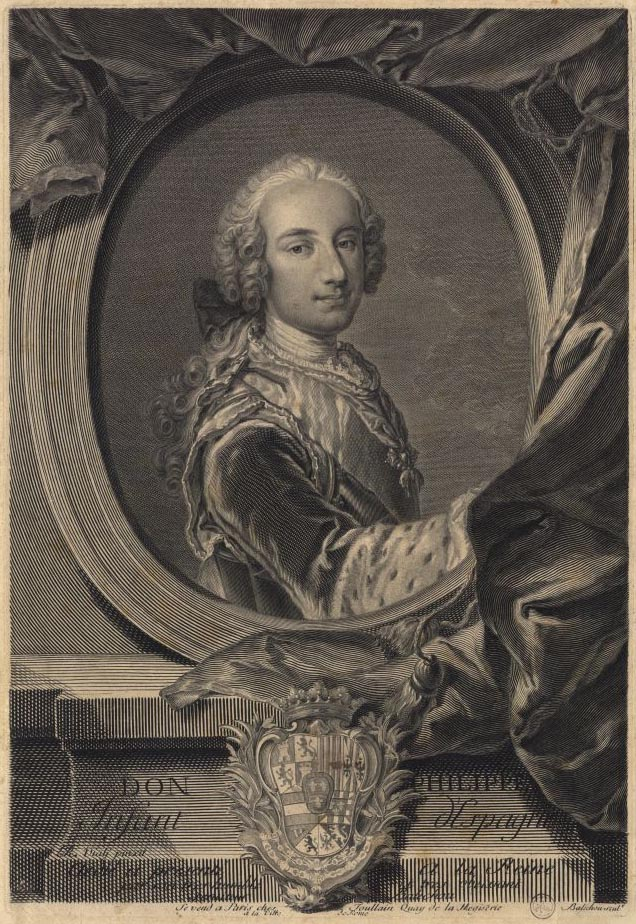
Philip, Duke of Parma

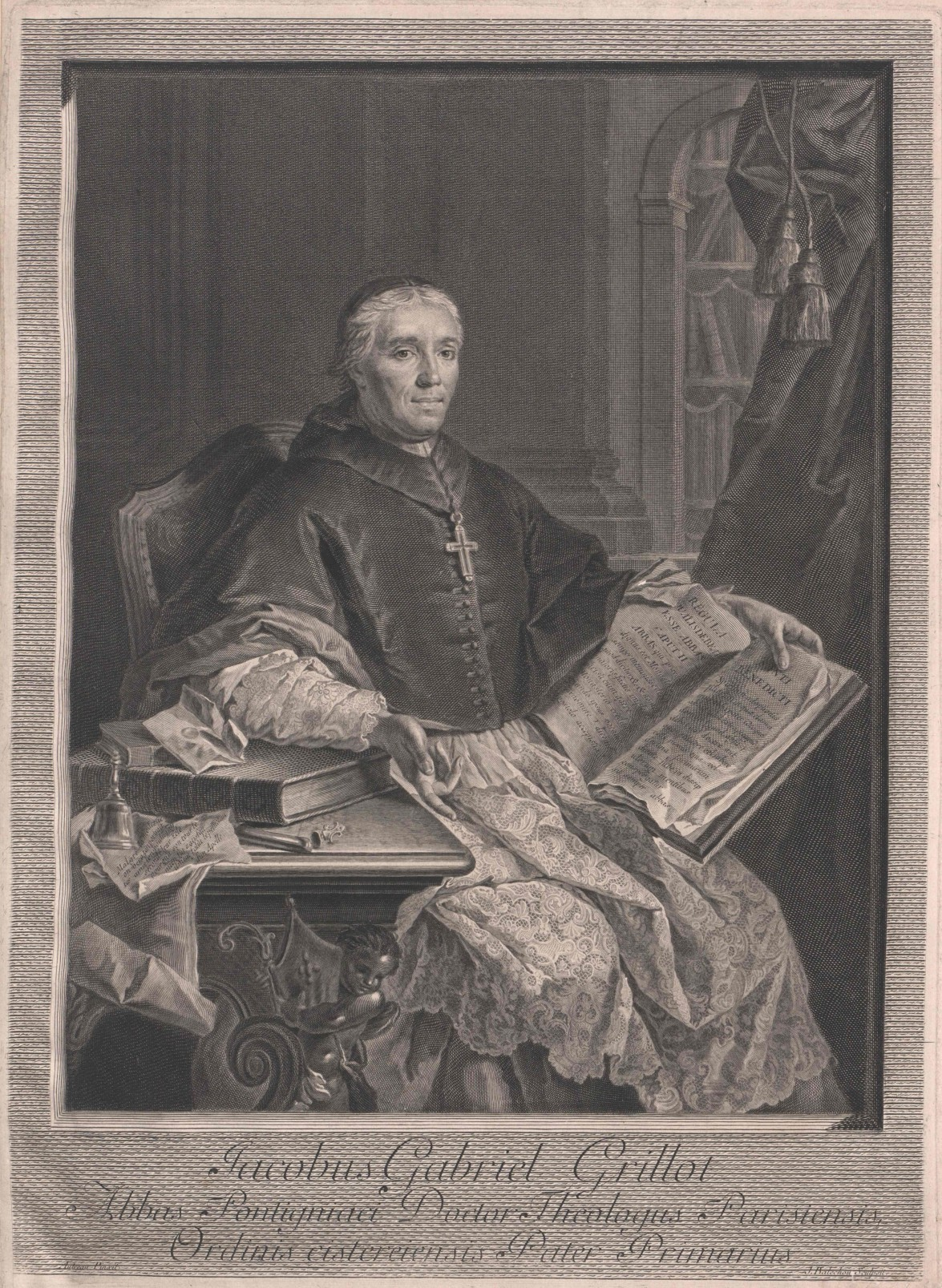
Jacques-Gabriel Grillot, abbot of Pontigny (1742-1764)
