= Pierre-Joseph Bourcet =

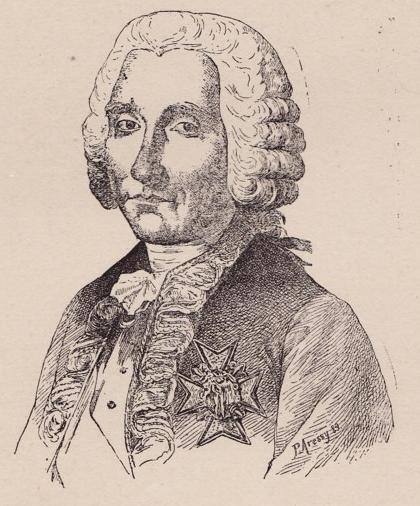
- Born: 1 March 1700; Usseaux (then in France, now Italy)
- Died: 14 October 1780 (aged 80); Meylan
- Military career
- Allegiance: Kingdom of France
- Branch: Engineers
- Service years: 1718–1780
- Rank: Lieutenant-général des armées du roi
- Conflicts: War of the Austrian Succession; Seven Years' War

Pierre-Joseph Bourcet (French: [pjɛʁ ʒozɛf buʁsɛ]; 1 March 1700 – 14 October 1780) was a French tactician, general, chief of staff, mapmaker and military educator. He was the son of Daniel-André Bourcet and of Marie-Magdeleine Legier.

== Life ==
Bourcet was born at Usseaux, in what is now Piedmont, northern Italy on 1 March 1700, the first son of Captain Daniele Andrea Bourcet.

At 18 years old, he began serving under his father, a captain in the French armies in the Alps. He completed his training, studying maths, and became a gunner before entering the infantry and finally the engineers. With the support of M. d'Asfeld, he joined the engineers corps in 1729. A long military career followed, ending at the rank of lieutenant-général des armées du roi, in 1762, the highest rank in the ancien régime military. At the start of his career, he was a protégé of the maréchal de Maillebois, accompanying him on a secret reconnaissance mission to France's Alpine frontier. He was chief engineer at Mont-Dauphin, from c. 1742, succeeding M. de Pène, whose daughter Marie-Anne de Pène he married.

Bourcet had initially joined the artillery, but by 1741 was already an engineer. Having also worked in secret correspondence with smaller Italian states, he was in 1744 an aide-marechal des logis, which is an assistant to a French chief of staff during the War of the Austrian Succession. An expert in mountain warfare, military engineering and fortifications, he devised the French invasion of Piedmont that led up to the Battle of Madonna dell'Olmo in 1744.

In 1752, he accompanied M. de Paulmy in his tour of inspection of the Alps. Contrary to claims about his role on the army staff in the Seven Years' War, he was director of the fortifications at Dauphiné from 1756 (appointed 1 June 1756) to 1777. At the end of 1759, he was made king's chief commissioner and charged with delineating the border between France and Piedmont-Sardinia, a mission concluded by treaty on 24 March 1760. That year also saw him involved in diplomatic missions to the Sardianian court in 1760. By 1762, he was in Versailles dealing with more secret correspondence. The end of the Seven Years' War saw him back in Grenoble, again working on the delineation of the border.

There is a popular myth that under the direction of the minister of war, Choiseul, in 1764 he established a staff-officer training school at Grenoble (it disappeared in 1771), where he taught on mountain warfare. This myth, designed to suggest that France developed modern military staffs stems from the 1888 printed version of 'Principes de la guerre de montagne' Bourcet's 1775 script, which has the claim made by Arvers, a Lt-Colonel in the French War Ministry, who "has restored the sense of certain passages, which have been altered by the omission or corruption of certain words". The claim is not footnoted. No such college existed. In fact, Bourcet was the Director of Engineering at Grenoble in 1763. On 1 April 1766, Bourcet was charged with "the direction of officers engaged in reconnaissance of the land". It was only in 1783 that Louis XVI ordered the creation of a permanent staff corps (whose members included Berthier)

He advocated officer training and organised dispersion in the mountains (having a large army march in separate columns along parallel roads, thus allowing them to be rapidly concentrated for attack or defence and to form three columns within each column and thus deploy onto the battlefield faster. He devised the strategic concept of "a plan with branches" (keeping the enemy confused as to your destination, so he had to split his forces to defend more than one place at once).

He died at Meylan without issue in 1780 - his heart is buried at the church of Notre-Dame du Laus.

== Influence ==
Notably, many of the ideas espoused in his work Principes de la guerre de montagne influenced the strategy employed by Napoleon as brigadier general of the artillery during the Second Battle of Saorgio (1794)

== Works ==
- Principes de la guerre de montagne, only published in 1888.
- Mémoires militaires sur les frontières de la France, du Piémont et de la Savoie depuis l'embouchure du Var jusqu'au lac de Genève, Berlin, 1802, in-8° et Paris et Strasbourg, Levrault frères, An X, in-8°
