= Lucy Allais =

Academic philosopher

Academic background
- Education: University of the Witwatersrand; University of Oxford
- Thesis: An Interpretation and Defence of Kant's Transcendental Idealism (2001)

Academic work
- Discipline: Philosophy
- Institutions: University of the Witwatersrand; Johns Hopkins University; University of California, San Diego; University of Sussex; University of the Witwatersrand; University of Oxford
- Main interests: Immanuel Kant; Transcendental idealism; Forgiveness; Punishment; Bioethics

Lucy Allais is a philosopher who holds academic positions at both the University of the Witwatersrand and Johns Hopkins University. Her research interests include the philosophy of Immanuel Kant, transcendental idealism as well as forgiveness, punishment, and bioethics.

== Education and career ==
Allais received an undergraduate degree in philosophy and art history from the University of the Witwatersrand in Johannesburg, moving on to gain both a master's (B.Phil) and D.Phil (2001) at the University of Oxford. Following her D.Phil., Allais taught for three years at Oxford, before moving to the University of Sussex in 2004. Between 2006 and 2008, Allais taught at the University of Witwatersrand. Beginning in 2008, Allais held a joint position between the University of the Witwatersrand, where she is now a full professor, and the University of Sussex. In 2014 she moved from Sussex to the University of California, San Diego, as the Henry E. Allison Chair of the History of Philosophy, keeping her joint appointment at the Witwatersrand. She left UCSD for Johns Hopkins in 2021.

== Scholarships and prizes ==
- 1996–1999: Rhodes Scholarship
- 2025: elected as member to the American Academy of Arts and Sciences

== Selected works ==
- Allais, L. (2015). Manifest reality: Kant's idealism and his realism. Oxford, UK: Oxford University Press.
