= Second Genoese–Savoyard War =

Military conflict in Liguria, Italy

Second Genoese-Savoyard War
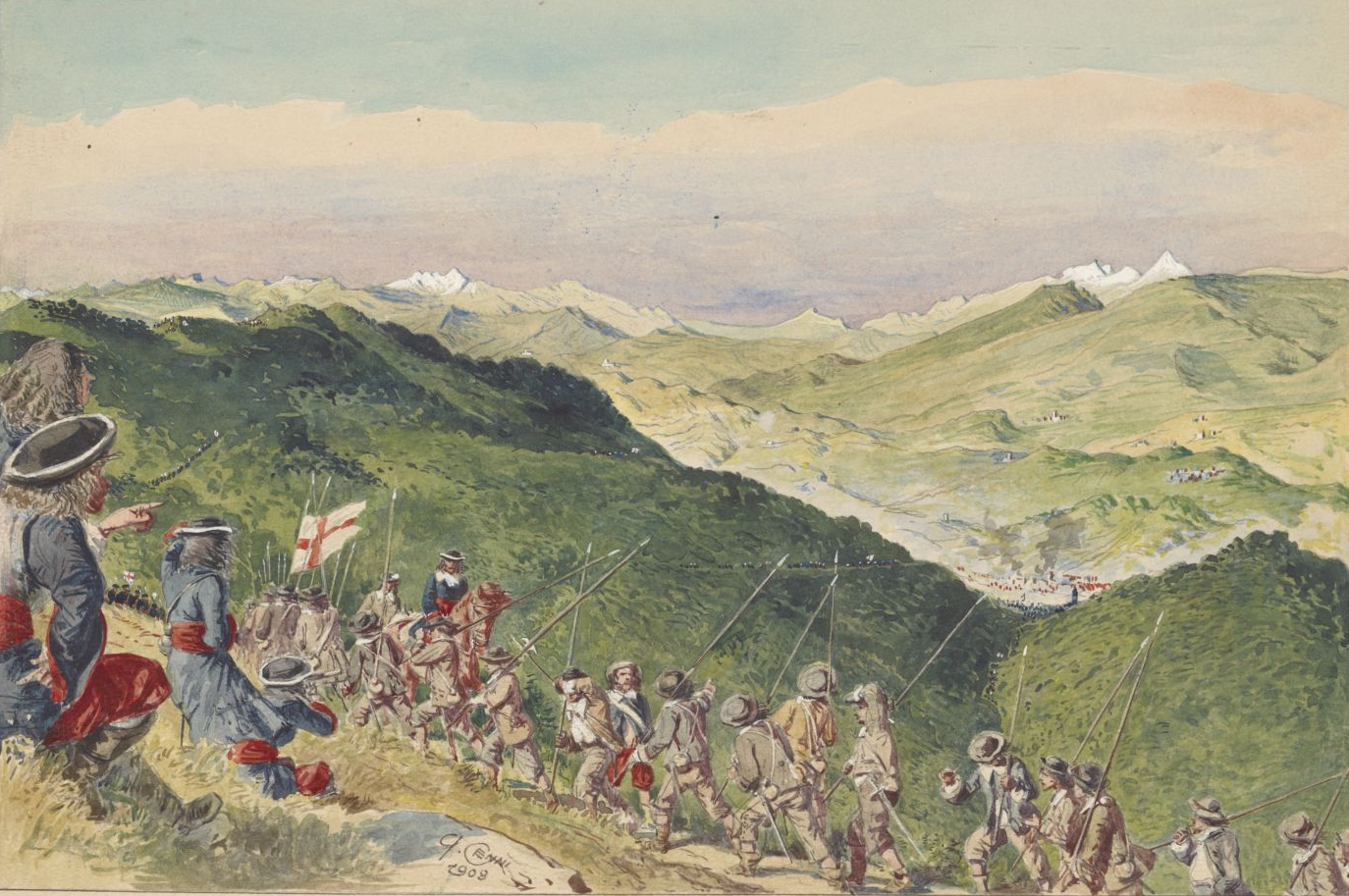
- Twenty century illustration of the Genoese forces during the battle in Garlenda
Date	1672–1673
Location	Liguria
Result	Genoese victory; Status quo ante bellum

Belligerents
Duchy of Savoy	Republic of Genoa; Supported by: Spain

Commanders and leaders
Charles Emmanuel II	

The Second Genoese–Savoyard War (1672–1673) was a short war fought between the Duchy of Savoy and the Republic of Genoa.

The war was launched by Charles Emmanuel II, Duke of Savoy, in 1672, but an exiled Genoese named Rafaello della Torre had initially prompted Charles Emmanuel into declaring war. Charles Emmanuel believed that Spain, engaged in hostilities with France in the Franco-Dutch War, would not assist Genoa. Charles Emmanuel's declaration of war was based on pretexts that were “slight and trivial,” and it was evident that his reasons for going to war were to gain the seaport of Savona.

The Savoyards initially had the upper hand, as the attack on Genoa was unexpected, and the Savoyards occupied Pieve di Teco “and some other Places; but these were soon recovered.”

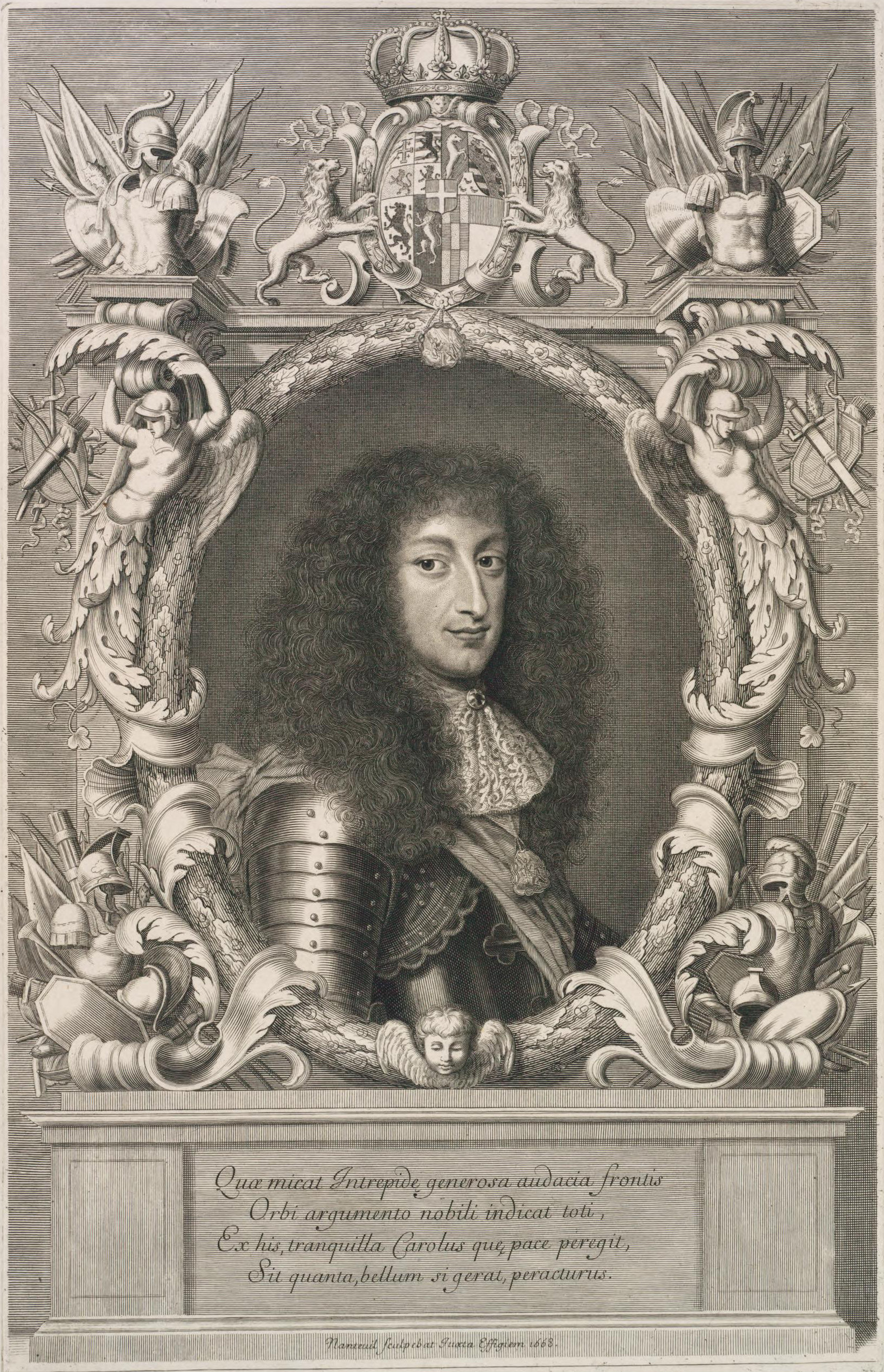
Charles Emmanuel II, Duke of Savoy

Despite Charles Emmanuel's predictions, the Genoese did receive aid from Spain.

The Savoyards under the Marquis of Catalan marched to Castelvecchio di Rocca Barbena with plans to fortify it. The Genoese opposed them with a force of 9,000 men and seized all the roads, before the Savoyards could provision themselves. As a result, about 300 Savoyard officers and men departed from Castelvecchio. The remaining forces were overrun on August 15, 1672, by the Genoese.

Some inconclusive battles followed, including a struggle for control of Oneglia. The Genoese advanced towards Oneglia with plans to attack by sea and land, but the Savoyards prevented them.

== End of war and aftermath ==
Louis XIV of France intervened diplomatically in the war to protect French interests. Louis XIV wanted to end the war between Savoy and Genoa before Charles Emmanuel could be completely defeated and a new front of the Franco-Dutch War could be opened in Italy.

Under the mediation of France, peace was concluded at the Château de Saint-Germain-en-Laye on January 18, 1673. Both sides returned whatever conquests that they had made.

According to George Procter, the war “scarcely merits our notice, for its circumstances and its conclusion were alike insignificant.” However, the war had deleterious effects on the Duchy of Savoy.

Since the war ended in defeat for Savoy, “a bitter search for scapegoats followed,” including Marchese di Pianezza, who had a prominent role in this war and was the duke's chief advisor. Pianezza was accused of treason and fled to France.

Savoy's 1672 war with Genoa also caused civil unrest: it had disrupted trade and resulted in the Savoyard government's program to levy tolls on goods entering the territory of Mondovì.

In 1684, French naval forces would bombard Genoa for its support of Spain.

== See also ==
- First Genoese–Savoyard War
