= Relief of Genoa =

1625 naval battle of the Thirty Years' War

Coordinates: 44°24′40″N 08°55′58″E

- Part of the Thirty Years' War
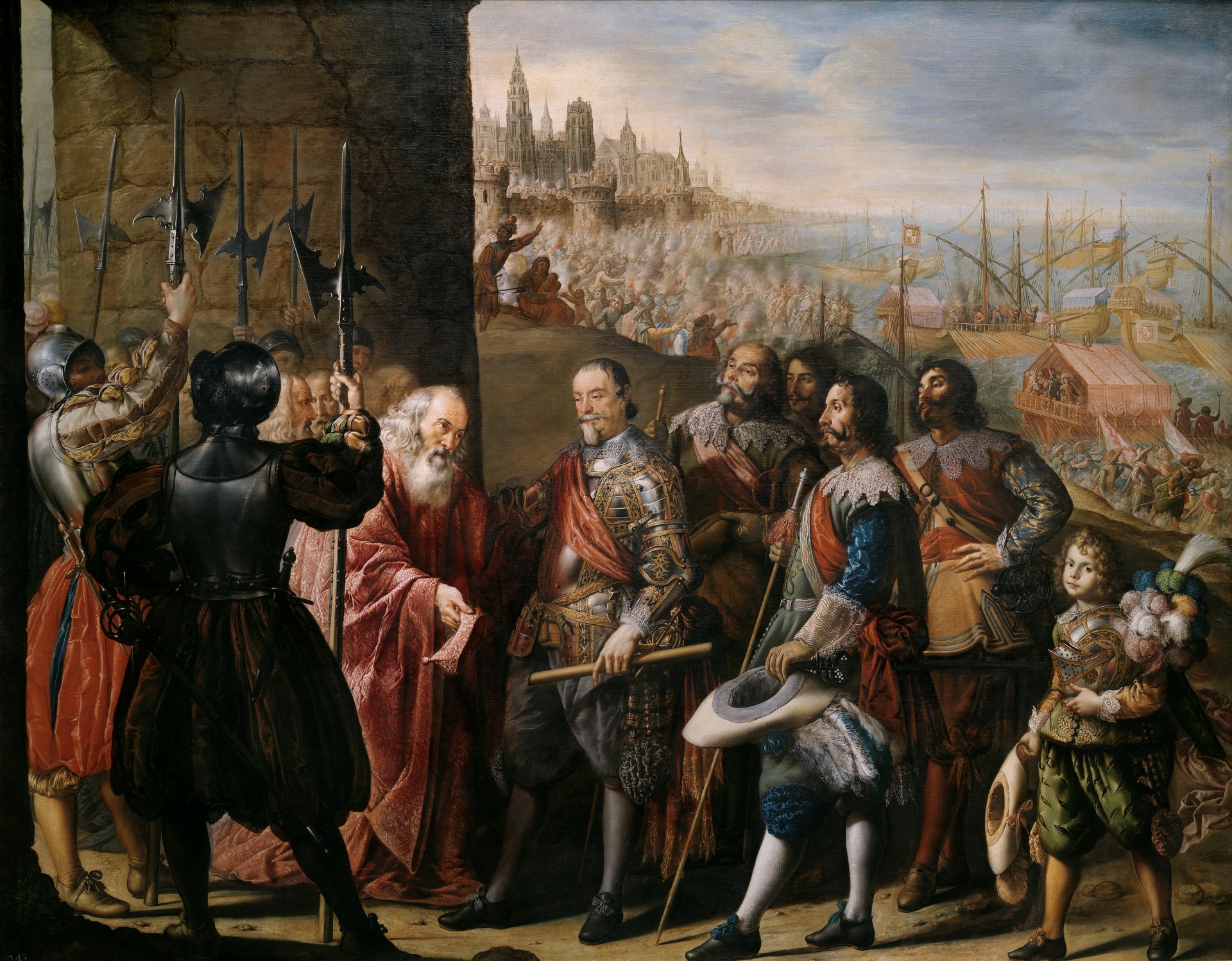
- Relief of Genoa by the Marquis of Santa Cruz by Antonio de Pereda. Museo del Prado.
| Date | March 28 – April 24, 1625 |
| Location | Genoa, Republic of Genoa (present-day Liguria, Italy) |
| Result | Spanish-Genoese victory: Spain launches counter-offensives; France surrenders its claims on Savoy and Valtellina and withdraws its troops from Piedmont and the Republic of Genoa, stipulated by the Treaty of Monzón; Reconquest of some territories in the French Riviera by the combined forces of Spain and the Republic of Genoa |

Belligerents
| France; Savoy | Spanish Empire; Genoa |

Commanders and leaders
| (Kingdom of France) François de Bonne, Duke of Lesdiguières (Duchy of Savoy) Charles Emmanuel, Duke of Savoy | (Spain) Álvaro de Bazán, Marquis of Santa Cruz (Spain) Gómez Suárez de Figueroa, Duke of Feria (Republic of Genoa) Carlo Doria, Duke of Tursi |

Strength
| 30,000 infantry 3,000 cavalry | 2,700–4,000 Spanish infantry (Genoa); 23 galleys 15,000 Spanish-Genoese (after the relief) |

Casualties and losses
| 5,000 dead or wounded 2,000 captured | 1,300 dead |

The Relief of Genoa took place between 28 March 1625 and 24 April 1625, during the Thirty Years' War. It was a major naval expedition launched by Spain against the French-occupied Republic of Genoa, whose capital, Genoa, was being besieged by a joint Franco-Savoyard army composed of 30,000 men and 3,000 cavalry.

In 1625, when the Republic of Genoa, traditionally an ally of Spain, was occupied by French troops of the Duke of Savoy, the city underwent a hard siege. It was known in Genoese governmental circles that one of the reasons why the Dutch government had offered their help to the Franco-Savoyard army was so that they could "hit the bank of the King of Spain".

However, the Spanish fleet commanded by General Álvaro de Bazán, Marquis of Santa Cruz, came to the aid of Genoa and relieved the city. Returning its sovereignty to the Republic of Genoa and forcing the French to raise the siege, they consequently began a combined campaign against the Franco-Savoyard forces that had overrun the Genoese Republic one year before. The joint Franco-Piedmontese army was forced to leave Liguria and Spanish troops invaded Piedmont, although this invasion was stopped. The Spanish Road was secured and Richelieu's invasion of Genoa had resulted in a humiliation of the French.

I have been careful until now to avoid anything that could provoke an open war between the two crowns; [but] if the king of Spain takes up arms against me, I will be the last to lay them down.

— Louis XIII to Francesco Barberini, early 1635

== Background ==
In northern Italy, Philip IV of Spain had followed his father's efforts to defend Catholics in the valleys of Valtellina against the Protestants in Graubünden. In 1622 Cardinal Richelieu had arranged an anti-Spanish league with Venice and Savoy. With his ascendancy, the French policy changed.

The French claimed that due to the alliance between them and the Duke of Savoy, they had to help Savoy, which was attacking Genoa, by attacking Valtelline and diverting the resources of the Spanish, who were supporters of Genoa. In the autumn of 1624, using the pretext that papal forces had not been withdrawn from the Valtelline as agreed, French and Swiss troops invaded the Catholic valleys of the Grey Leagues and seized the forts, to protect them, Richelieu had established the Governors of the Duchy of Milan. Consequently, Spain formed an alliance with the Grand Duchy of Tuscany, the Duchies of Modena and Parma, and the Republics of Genoa and Lucca, deciding on a joint action.

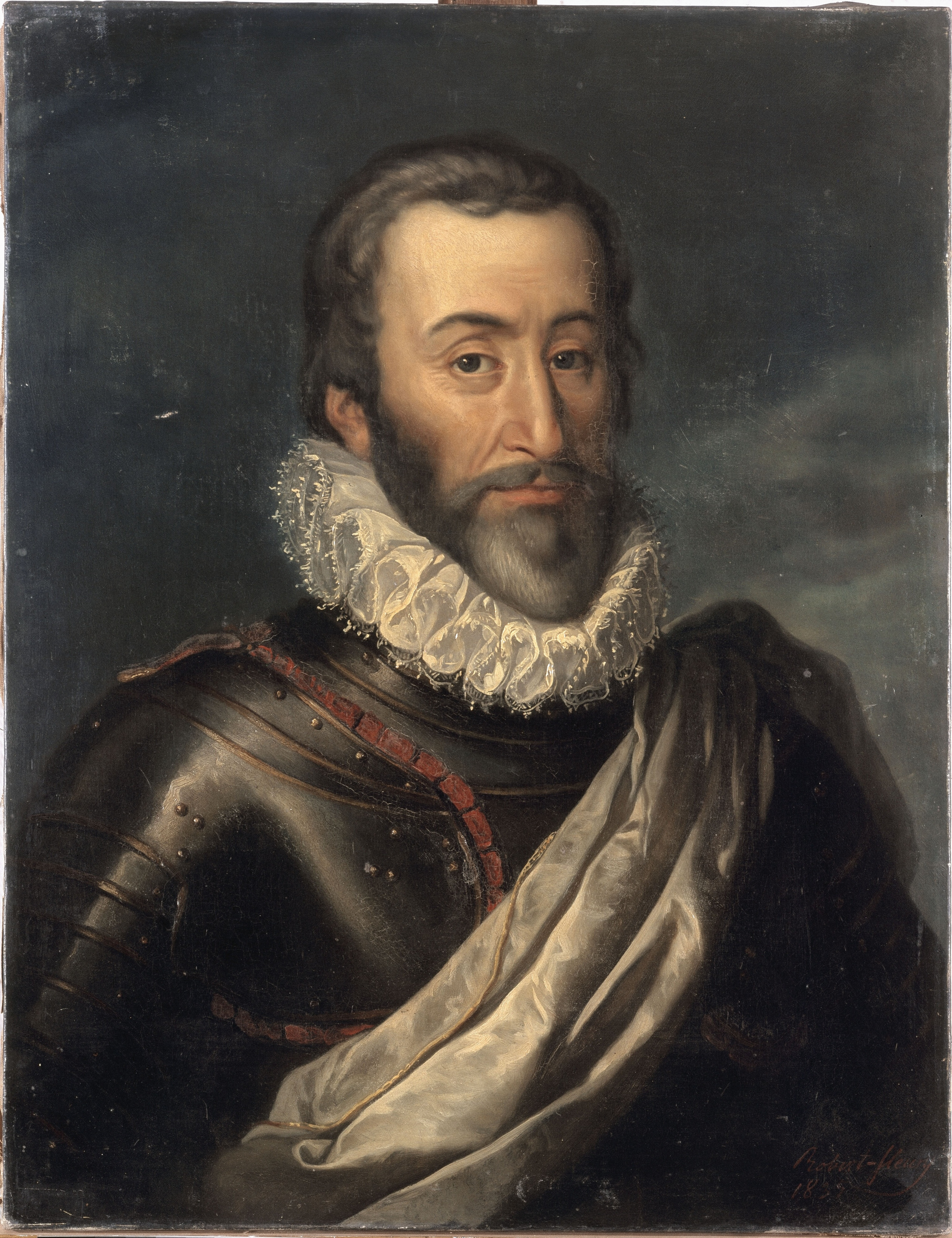
François de Bonne, Duke de Lesdiguieres, commander of the French army.

The irony of a cardinal attacking the troops of a Pope was not lost on Rome, Spain, and ultra-Catholics in France. In 1625 the French marshals François de Bonne, Duke of Lesdiguières and Charles de Blanchefort, Marquis de Créquy, joined the Duke of Savoy, invading the territories of the Republic of Genoa. An attack on Genoa would cut the southern end of the Spanish Road and knock out Spain's banker.

The time seemed opportune, with the apparent convergence of Protestant hostility to the Habsburgs, and explains French participation in the London talks with Mansfeld. Richelieu hoped England and the Dutch would send a fleet to assist his own squadron in cutting the seaway between Spain and Genoa, while Venice attacked Milan.

François Annibal d'Estrées, Duke of Estrées and 3,500 French troops crossed Protestant Swiss territory to join a similar number of Swiss levied with French money. More subsidies and troops poured into Savoy, where the French formed a third of the 30,000-strong army that began operations against Genoa in February 1625. The attack caught the Genoese unprepared. Most of the Republic was overrun, while 4,000 reinforcements from Spain were intercepted by French warships in March.

By this time Cardinal Richelieu remarked:

I shall not emphasize, that Spain, pressed to extremity by us, might enter its forces into France, either from the kingdom [of Spain] itself or from Flanders. It is easy to guard against invasion from Spain with small forces because of the lie of the land.

The Duke of Estrées quickly conquered the Valtellina, because the papal garrisons offered no resistance except at Riva and Chiavenna. Richelieu's elaborate plan then began to unravel. The Valtellina operation placed France in direct opposition to an essentially Francophile papacy, incensing the dévots. Don Gómez Suárez de Figueroa, Duke of Feria sent 6,000 men and Tommaso Caracciolo, Count of Roccarainola as maestre de campo in order to reinforce the city of Genoa, which continued to resist the Franco-Savoyard siege. Venice abstained from the fighting, while English and Dutch support failed to materialize, enabling Spain to break through the relatively weak French fleet and relieve Genoa in August.

Genoese doge Alessandro Giustiniani wrote:

At present our republic and its liberty are founded on its fortunes and on the protection of Spain, and we must hope to find strength in the arms of this monarch. These vessels, besides the unbearable cost to us, would show complete imprudence, or even make the Spaniards jealous. It has been proposed, but nothing has been decreed.

France also sent financial help to the Dutch Republic, and subsidised the siege of Mansfeld.

Richelieu arrived at Turin on 1 February 1625, and at the walls of Asti on 4 March, between Genoa and Milan. After storming Capriata, Novi and Rossiglione, Lesdiguières decided to slow his pace, capturing Voltaggio and preferring to lay siege to Gavi, against the advice of the Duke of Savoy. Gavi surrendered on 22 April, but it was too late to take Genoa. In the Tyrol, an imperial army was preparing to intervene in the Valtelline valley, while the Spanish army under the Duke of Feria prepared to come to Genoa's aid.

== French threat ==
The number of galleys of the Genoese republic were increased from eight to ten, and the republic was defended by around 11,000 soldiers consisting of German mercenaries and men raised within the walls of the republic. By February the invaders were within sight of the city and began to occupy the western riviera. In March Genoa was attacked by the combined army and the French fleet threatened to cut communications with Spain, capturing three Genoese ships carrying nearly 650,000 pieces of eight.

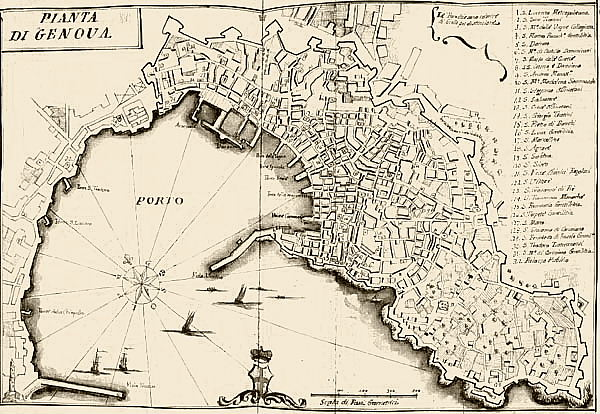
Map of Genoa printed by Francesco Maria Accinelli, 18th century.

Troops Embarking on a Galley in the Port of Genoa, engraving by Cornelis de Wael circa 1630.

Yet while the strategic importance of the city and port of Genoa to the Spanish military system ensured that an attack would certainly succeed in drawing off Spanish troops, it presented France with military difficulties that were as considerable as those of the Valtelline theatre. Above all, Spanish naval superiority would make an effective seaward blockade of Genoa impossible, and greatly reduce the likelihood of success if the siege proved to be lengthy. Moreover, an attack on a third party, albeit a firm ally of Spain, was hard to reconcile with the rhetoric of liberating the peninsula from the yoke of Habsburg servitude; other secondary powers such as Mantua, Modena, Parma and especially France's habitual ally, Venice, drew the obvious conclusion and declined to join the Franco-Savoyard initiative.

Despite these dangers the Duke de Lesdigueres and constable of France, moved down through Piedmont to blockade Genoa with an army of 23,000 men, one third of whom were French.

At first, Richelieu sought to present the military situation to the king in the most optimistic light, maintaining in May 1625 that:

Now all things conspire to cast off the pride of Spain.

Yet even this mémoire could not avoid reference to the growing concern that Spain might widen the conflict by an attack from Flanders of up from Spain itself.

Genoa entrusted the command of his army to the Carlo Doria, Duke of Tursi and his general field master Giovanni Gerolamo Doria, while the Marquis of Santa Cruz was ordered to relieve the city. Spanish infantry from Naples embarked, including 2,000 veteran troops from Holland. Santa Cruz reached Genoa and was received with great joy by the decayed spirits of the citizens. Soon the tenacity and experience of the Tercios under the Duke of Feria obtained good results and the French army began to retreat, as they were besieged by two fronts and the situation was becoming unsustainable. After a month the Franco-Savoian retreated and the Spanish was able to capture the city, so very important for their economy. Santa Cruz also counter-attacked by sea, destroying three French warships at the Hyeres islands.

== Aftermath ==
=== Spanish invasion of Piedmont ===
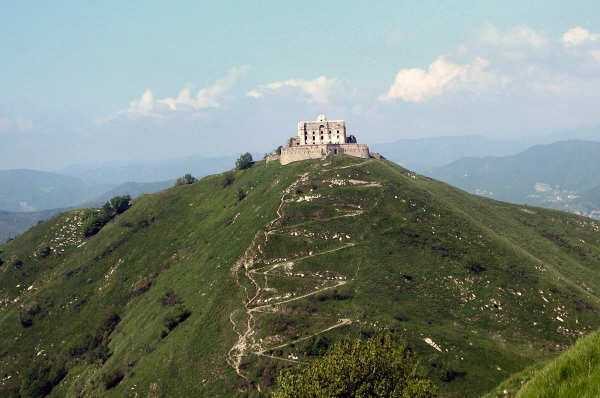
Genoese Star Fort Diamante

The Spanish took Acqui then marched against Casale, reclaiming Gavi and Novi, while Lesdiguieres beat a retreat to the Piedmont. The Duke of Savoy, joined by the Marquis de Créquy, who replaced Lesdiguieres (who had returned to the Dauphiné) beat a retreat to the Piedmont and entrenched their army at Verrua. The Duke of Feria was stopped on 5 August 1625, and shortly afterwards he lifted the siege of Verrua and Lesdiguieres took his troops back to the Dauphiné.

=== Liguria ===
Feria managed to rescue the panicked Genoese governors that were hidden inside the walls of Savona. French-Savoyard policies were lying in ruins. At the end the force led by the Duke of Savoy and the Marquis of Créquy met not easy victory but fierce resistance from the militia of the Genoese Apennines, supported by Spanish forces from Milan. The invaders were forced to retreat, and returned across the Alps in November.

=== Reconquest of the French Riviera ===
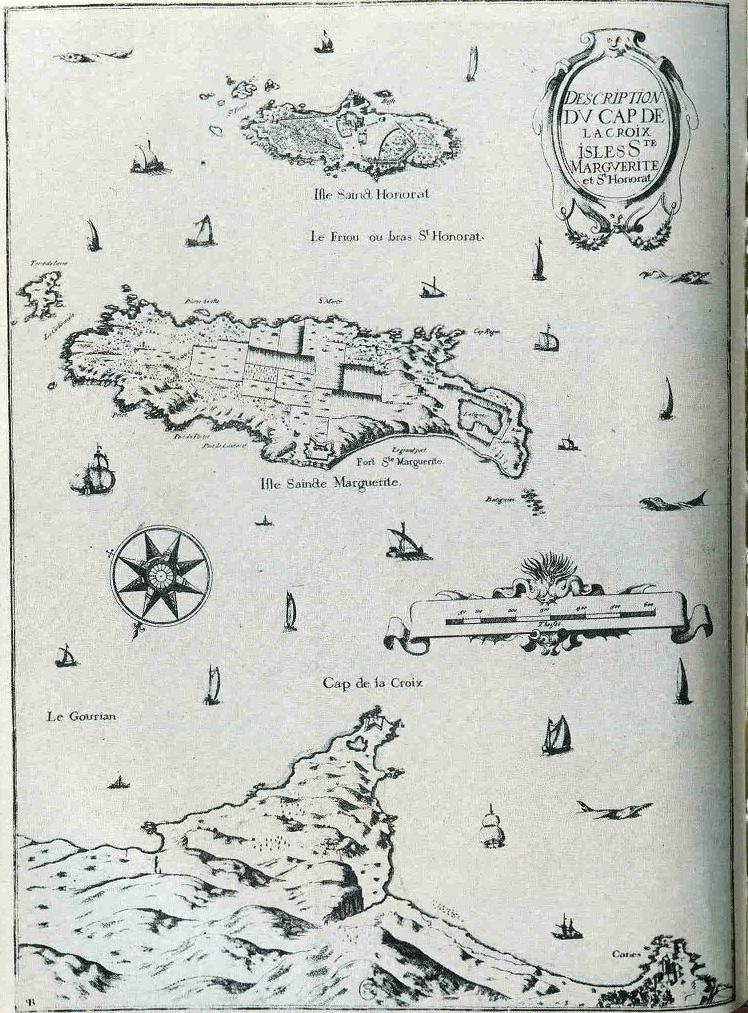
Map of the Lérins Islands, circa 1630.

After the Spanish had relieved Genoa, the Genoese allowed their troops to be placed under the command of the Count of Roccarainola, as suggested by the Spanish crown. Galeazzo Giustiani with four of the republic's galleys captured the Savoyard capitana and things seemed to be taking a turn for the better. Disillusion with Spanish management of the war came quickly, though. The Genoese were eager to recover their lost territories, but Santa Cruz, now with seventy galleys in the port, refused to leave the city.

The reconquest was brought about that summer and the following autumn by a fleet of forty galleys under the joint command of the republic's general, Emmanuele Garbarino, Spanish admiral Santa Cruz, and the Duke of Tursi. By October the republic had recuperated all its lost territory with the exception of the castle of La Penna and had even added Oneglia, Ormea, and a number of localities in Piedmont to its possessions.

Santa Cruz successfully stormed and captured the forts of Albenga, Port Maurice, Ventimiglia, Lovan, Gandore, Casanova, Oneglia, Triola, Castelfranco, Bigran, San Remo, Camporosso, conquering the biggest islets of the Lérins Islands, Île Sainte-Marguerite and Île Saint-Honorat. The Spanish retained both islands until they were reconquered by the French admiral Philippe de Poincy, on 12 March 1637.

=== Consequences ===
The relief on Genoa lasted one month, but Spanish aid had been prompt and effective. The reversal of Genoese sorts when all seemed lost, the continued arrival of silver shipments even in Spanish galleys, and the unwavering behavior of Doria and his fellow asentistas de galeras all seemed to substantiate the positions of those who, like Doge Alessandro Giustiani in 1613, saw perfect union and harmony of intents in the alliance with Spain and the bonds between the Genoese nobility and Philip IV.

All was not to go to the republic's liking, however, in 1625. In October, at the height of success against Genoa's northern neighbor, the Spanish and the French, without consulting their respective allies signed a six-month truce, which was imposed on Genoa and Savoy as well.

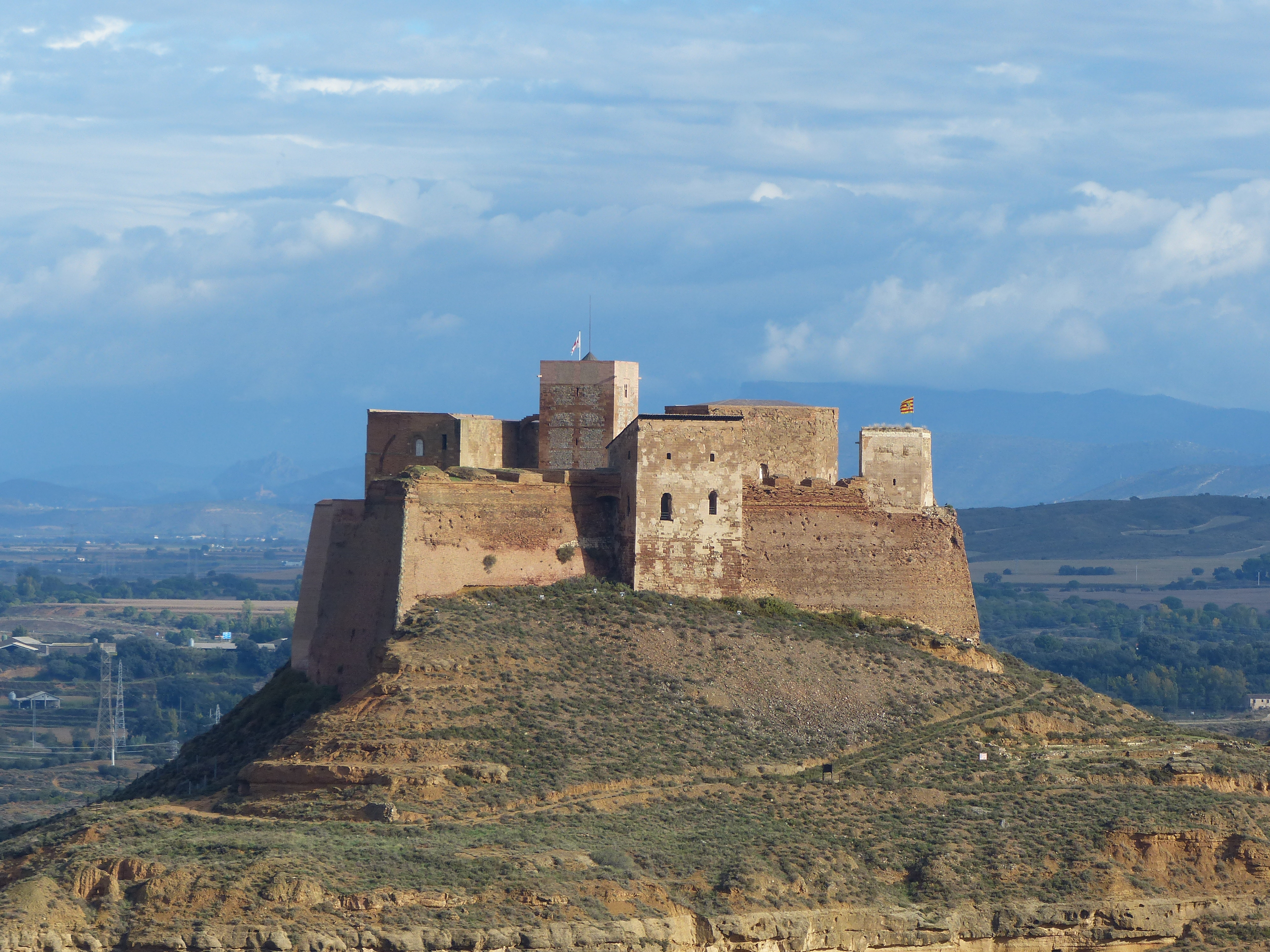
Castle at Monzón

In early 1626, as Savoy rearmed and the Republic of Genoa began to fear that it would again become the object of French and Piedmontese appetites, Santa Cruz proposed some modifications in the alliance between Spain and the republic. Given the events of the previous year, the Genoese were particularly well disposed toward Philip IV and accepted an alliance for the mutual defense of one another's states, the republic agreeing as well to maintain 14,000 infantry and 1,500 cavalry, the expenses for which they were to be reimbursed through the alienation to the Genoese of equivalent sums from the royal revenue in Spain. Furthermore, the republic agreed to send 70,000 scudi a month to the governor of Milan against similar assignations to be specified at a later date. In the event of a Savoyard attack on the republic, Philip IV committed himself to attacking Piedmont on its exposed side from Milan. And should Milan be attacked, the Genoese would invade Piedmont from the south.

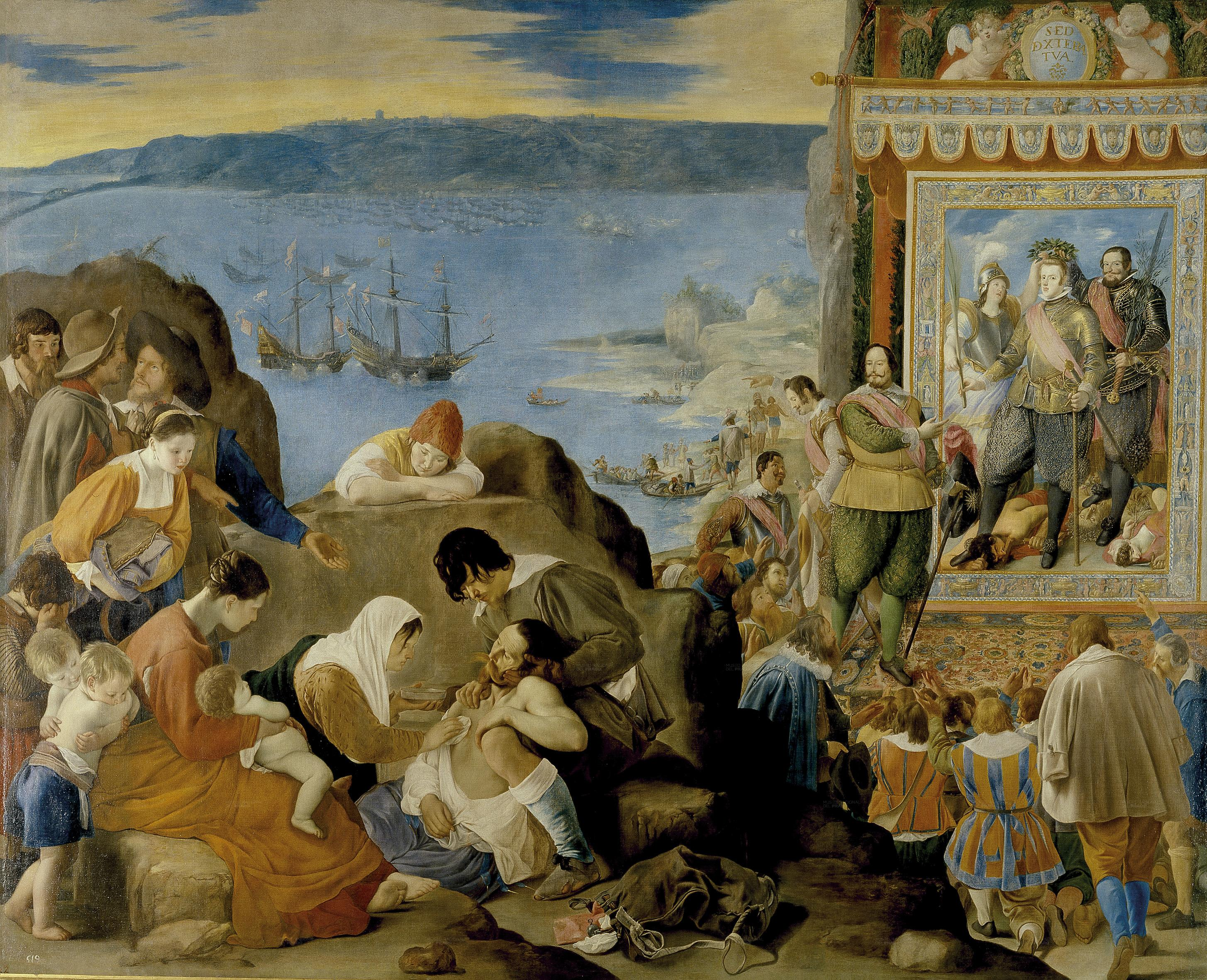
The Recovery of Bahía de Todos los Santos, by Fray Juan Bautista Maíno, Museo del Prado.

In March 1626 the French and Spanish concluded the Treaty of Monzón, suspension of fighting between the Duke of Savoy and the Republic of Genoa being an integral part of the agreement. The Treaty on 5 March 1626, restored the pre-1618 situation with important qualifications. Jurisdiction was nominally restored over the Valtellina; this was now recognized as Catholic, which strengthened its autonomy and introduced doubt as to who could decide on transit through the valley. Papal troops replaced the French though the forts were supposed to be destroyed.

Monzón represented a serious reverse for Richelieu who blamed his envoy for the terms and feigned illness to avoid seeing the furious Savoyard ambassador. Abandoned, Savoy was obliged to make its own peace and now sought a Spanish alliance and intrigued with French malcontents against Richelieu, including possible involvement in the Chalais plot to murder the cardinal in 1626. The Valtelline valley was returned to the Vatican. Spanish forces scored a series of striking successes. In the spring of 1625 they regained Bahia in Brazil and Breda in the Netherlands from the Dutch. In the autumn they repulsed the English at Cadiz.

== See also ==
- Second Genoese–Savoyard War
- Annus mirabilis

== Sources ==
- Bercé, Yves Marie. The Birth of Absolutism: A History of France, 1598–1661. Palgrave USA (2003) ISBN 978-0-312-15807-1
- Braudel, Fernand. Civilization and Capitalism, 15th–18th Century: The Perspective of the World. University of California Press (1992) ISBN 978-0-520-08116-1
- Callo, Joseph F. Who's Who in Naval History: From 1550 to the Present. Routledge. ISBN 978-0-415-30828-1
- Ciro, Paoletti. A Military History of Italy. Praeger Publishing (2007) ISBN 978-0-275-98505-9
- Duro, Fernandez Cesáreo (1898), Armada española desde la Unión de los Reinos de Castilla y de León (in Spanish), vol. 4, Madrid: Est. tipográfico "Sucesores de Rivadeneyra", p. 67
- Engels, Marie-Christine. Merchants, Interlopers, Seamen and Corsairs: The "Flemish" Community in Livorno and Genoa (1615–1635). Verloren Publishing (1997) ISBN 978-90-6550-570-5
- Kirk, Allison Thomas. Genoa and the Sea: Policy and Power in an Early Modern Maritime Republic. The Johns Hopkins University Press (2005) ISBN 978-0-8018-8083-4
- Moote Lloyd, A. Louis XIII, the Just. University of California Press (1991) ISBN 978-0-520-07546-7
- Osborne, Toby. Dynasty and Diplomacy in the Court of Savoy; Political Culture and the Thirty Years' War. Cambridge University Press; 1st edition (2007) ISBN 978-0-521-03791-4
- Parker, Geoffrey. The Thirty Years' War. Routledge; 2nd edition (1997) ISBN 978-0-415-12883-4
- Parker, Geoffrey. Europe in Crisis, 1598–1648. Wiley-Blackwell; 2nd edition (2001) ISBN 978-0-631-22028-2
- Parrott, David (2001). Richelieu's Army: War, Government, and Society in France, 1624–1642. Cambridge, UK: Cambridge University Press. ISBN 978-0-521-79209-7.
- Pearce, Brian; Lublinskaya, A.D. French Absolutism: The Crucial Phase, 1620–1629. Cambridge University Press; 1st edition (October 30, 2008) ISBN 978-0-521-08843-5
- Stradling, Robert A. Spain's Struggle for Europe, 1598–1668. London: Hambledon & London Publishing (2003) ISBN 978-1-85285-089-0
- Thion, Stéphane. French Armies of the Thirty Years War. Auzielle: LRT Publishing (2008) ISBN 978-2-917747-01-8
- Thompson, William R. Great Power Rivalries. Columbia: University of South Carolina Press (1999) ISBN 978-1-57003-279-0
- Wilson, Peter H. (2009). The Thirty Years War: Europe's Tragedy. Harvard University Press. ISBN 978-0-674-03634-5.
