= Allai =

Allai may refer to:

- Allai District
- Allai, Sardinia
- Allai Valley
