= Pierre Allais =

French painter and pastel artist

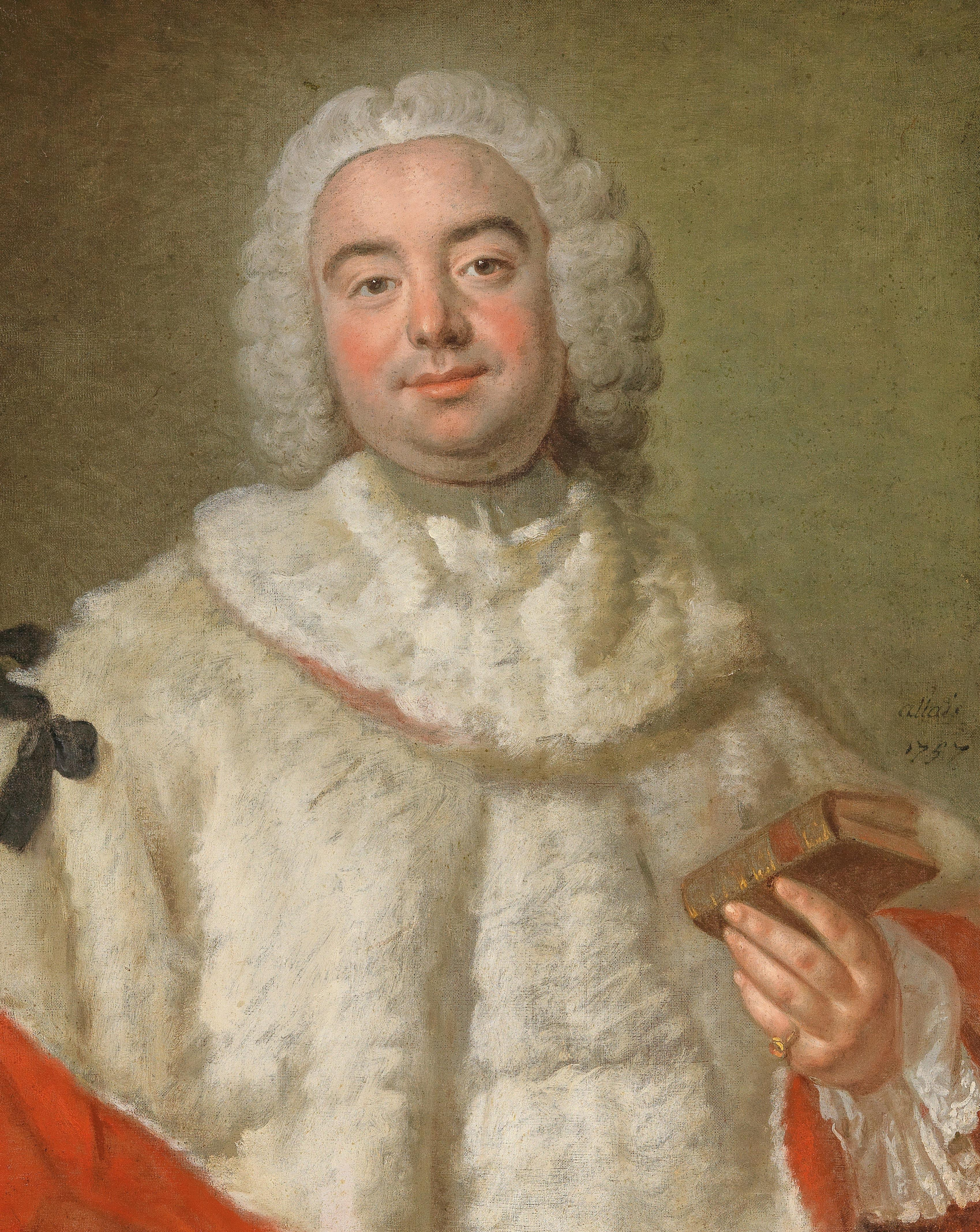
Portrait of a Man (1757) by Pierre Allais; possibly a portrait of François-Joachim de Pierre de Bernis

Pierre Allais (c. 1700 – January 14, 1781) was a French painter and pastel artist.

== Career ==
Allais was born in Paris. He was admitted to the Academy of Saint-Luc in 1745; he also probably worked there as an assistant professor. The influence of Jean-Marc Nattier can be observed in his works.

He won the first prize for painting at the Royal Academy of Painting and Sculpture in 1726.

He died in Paris in 1781; on March 25, 1782, his widow, Marie-Françoise Ansiaume, was buried in the Saint-Sulpice cemetery.

Allais's works in public collections include:

- Portrait de femme, oil on canvas, Paris, Petit Palais
- Portrait of a Young officer, pastel, 1756, Detroit Institute of Arts

== Gallery ==
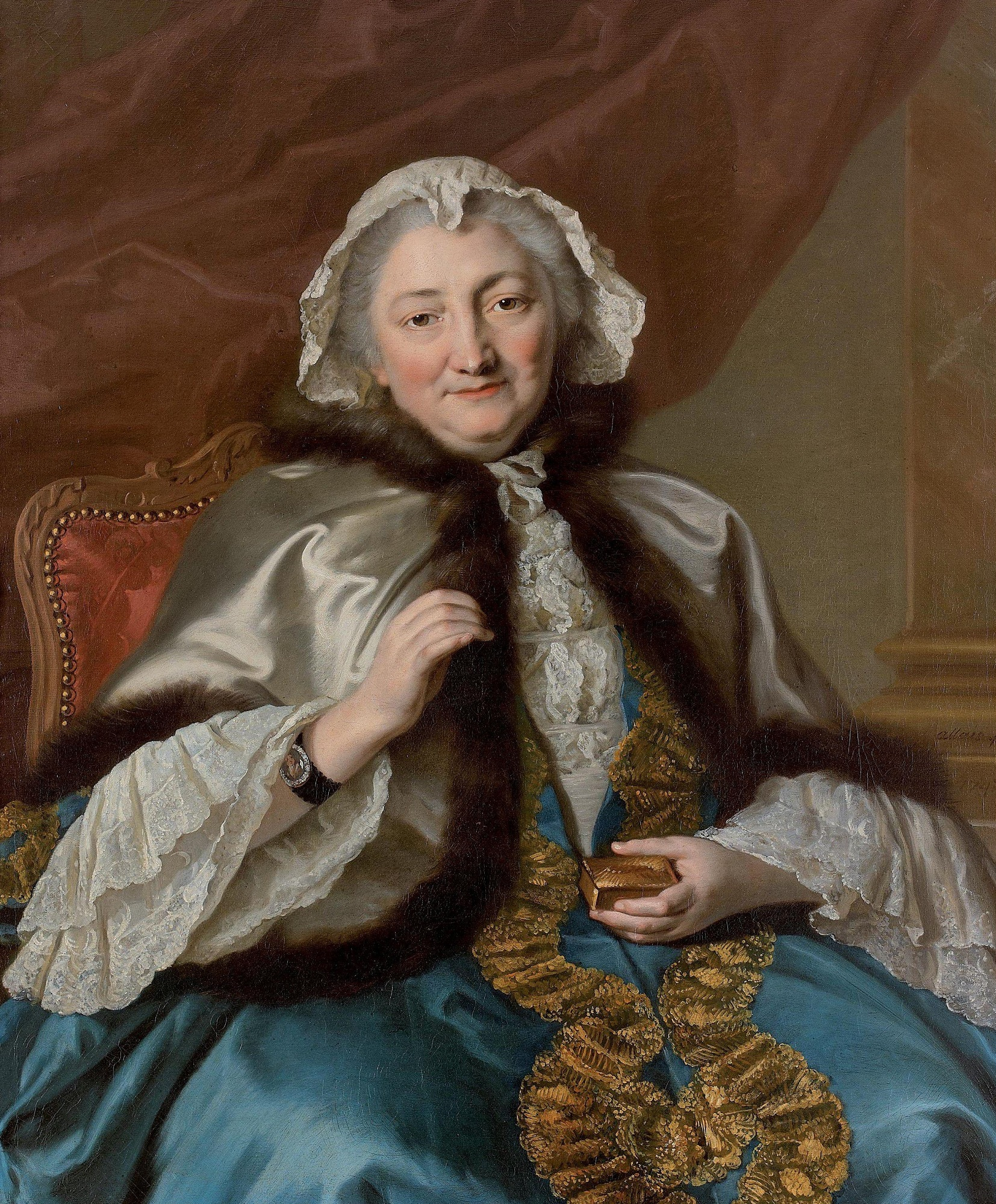
Portrait de Madame Geoffrin, 1747

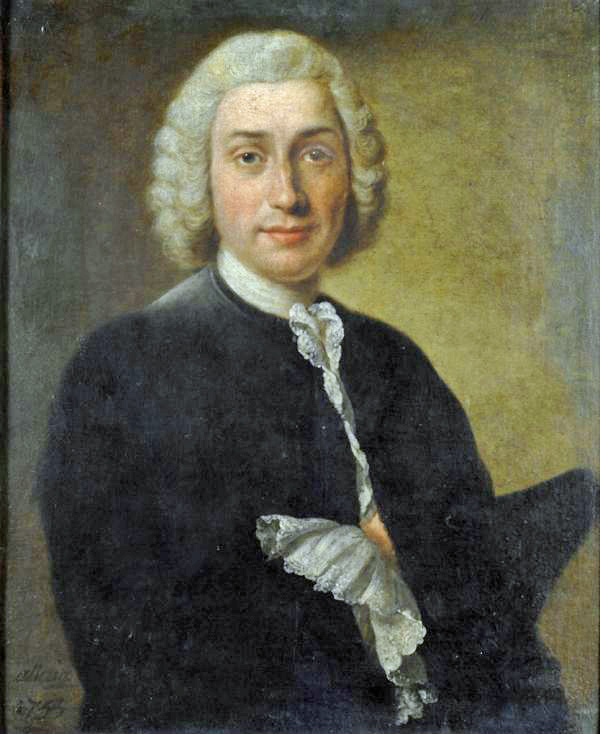
Portrait of a nobleman, 1753
