= 153rd Infantry Division "Macerata" =

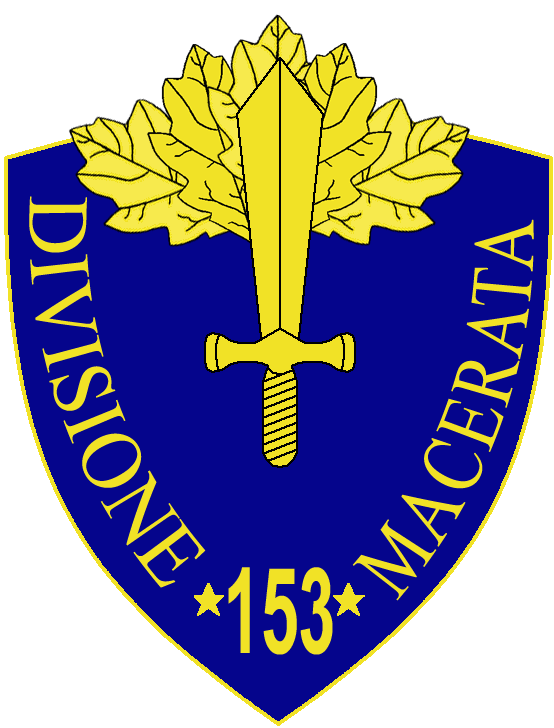
- 153rd Infantry Division "Macerata" insignia
- Active: 25 November 1941– 12 September 1943
- Country: Kingdom of Italy
- Branch: Royal Italian Army
- Type: Infantry
- Size: Division
- Engagements: World War II

Insignia
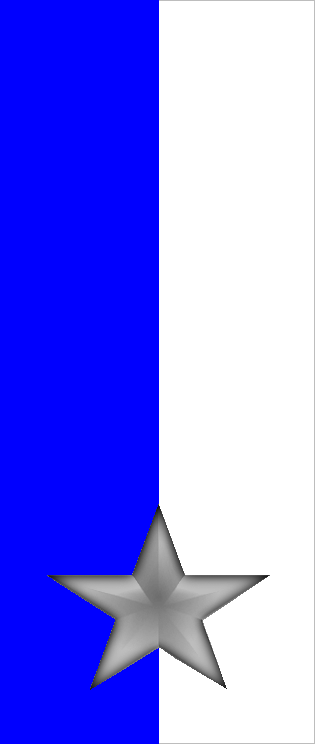
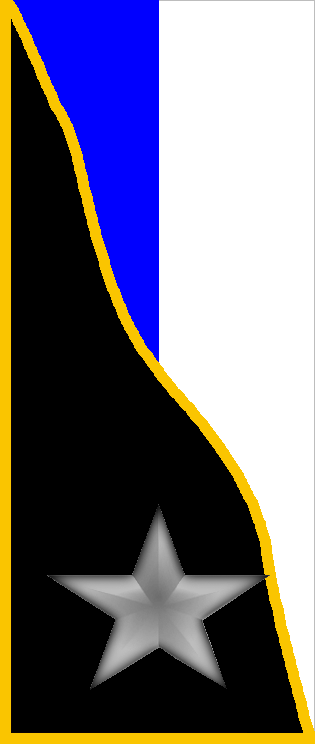
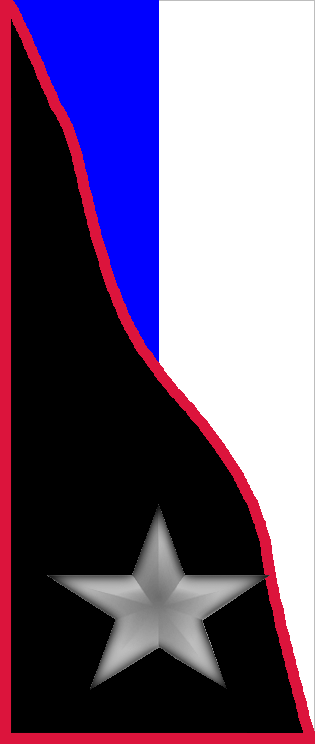
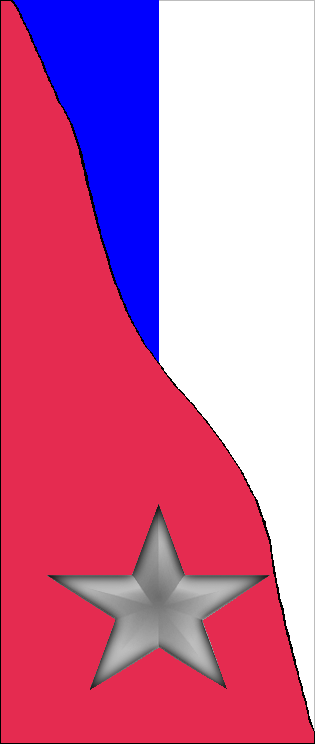
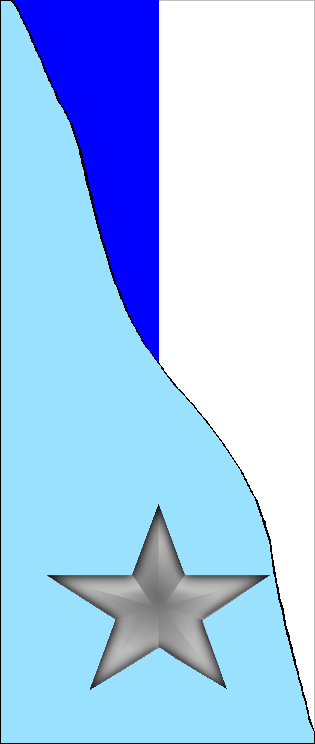
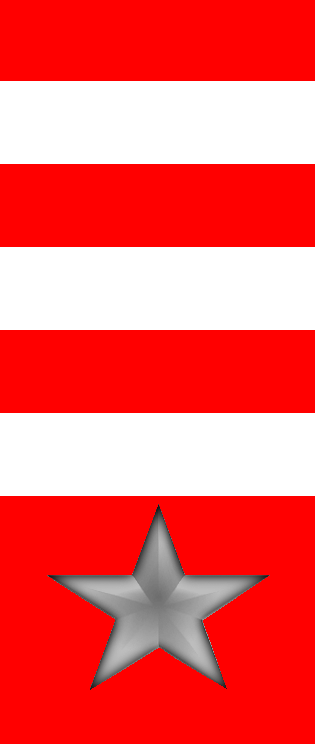
- Identification symbol: Macerata Division gorget patches

The 153rd Infantry Division "Macerata" (Italian: 153ª Divisione di fanteria "Macerata") was an infantry division of the Royal Italian Army during World War II. The Macerata was formed on 25 November 1941 and named for the city of Macerata. The Macerata was classified as an occupation infantry division, which meant that the division's artillery regiment consisted of two artillery groups instead of the three artillery groups of line infantry divisions and that the divisional mortar battalion was replaced by a divisional machine gun battalion.

In June 1942 the division was transferred to Slovenia and in May 1943 moved to Croatia. It was located in Delnice in Croatia, when the Armistice of Cassibile was announced on 8 September 1943. The Macerata then marched to Rijeka, where it was dissolved by German forces on 12 September 1943.

== History ==
=== World War I ===
The division's lineage begins with the Brigade "Macerata" raised on 1 March 1915 with the 121st and 122nd infantry regiments. The brigade fought on the Italian front in World War I and together with its regiments was disbanded after the war in November 1919.

=== World War II ===
The 153rd Infantry Division "Macerata" was activated in Forlì on 25 November 1941 and consisted of the 121st Infantry Regiment "Macerata", 122nd Infantry Regiment "Macerata", and the 153rd Artillery Regiment "Macerata". As a division raised during the war the Macerata did not have its own regimental depots and therefore its regiments were raised by the depots of the 56th Infantry Division "Casale": the 121st Infantry Regiment "Macerata" was raised in Forlì on 15 October 1941 by the 11th Infantry Regiment "Casale" and the 122nd Infantry Regiment "Macerata" was raised in Cesena on 20 September 1941 by the 12th Infantry Regiment "Casale", while the 153rd Artillery Regiment "Macerata" was raised by the 56th Artillery Regiment "Casale" in Rimini.

In June 1942 the Macerata moved to Kočevje and Ribnica in the Province of Ljubljana, where already on 9 June Yugoslav partisans engaged the division. Anti-partisan search operations in Livold, Vrtače, and Rakitnica by the Macerata were unsuccessful and partisan forces attacked the divisions positions at Dolga Vas and Šalka Vas and on 14 June Mozelj, Kočarji and Črni Potok.

In July 1942 the Macerata fought partisan formations in the area of Sodražica, and in August in the area of Križna Gora, and in September in the area of Črnomelj. In April 1943 the division battled with partisans in the area of Kočevje, before moving in May to Delnice and Ogulin in Croatia, where the division battled with partisans in from Stubica to Drage. In June the Macerata tried to dislodge partisan formations in Stari Laz, Ravna Gora, Cerovnik and Munjava.

On 8 September 1943 when the Armistice of Cassibile was announced the division was located at Delnice and Ogulin, from where it moved to Rijeka. After arriving in Rijeka the division was disbanded on 12 September by invading German forces.

== Organization ==
153rd Infantry Division "Macerata" organization

- 153rd Infantry Division "Macerata"
  - Headquarters
    - Command Company
    - 116th Carabinieri Section
    - 117th Carabinieri Section
    - 153rd Field Post Office
    - 153rd Infantry Division Command Transport Squad
  - 121st Infantry Regiment "Macerata"
    - Command Company
    - 3 × Fusilier battalions
    - Cannons Company (47/32 mod. 35 anti-tank guns)
    - Mortar Company (81mm Mod. 35 mortars)
  - 122nd Infantry Regiment "Macerata"
    - Command Company
    - 3 × Fusilier battalions
    - Cannons Company (47/32 mod. 35 anti-tank guns)
    - Mortar Company (81mm Mod. 35 mortars)
  - 153rd Artillery Regiment "Macerata"
    - Command Unit
    - I Group (100/22 mod. 14/19 howitzers; transferred on 25 November 1941 from the 151st Artillery Regiment "Perugia")
    - II Group (75/27 mod. 06 field guns)
    - 1 × Anti-aircraft battery (20/65 Mod. 35 anti-aircraft guns)
    - Ammunition and Supply Unit
  - CLIII Mortar Battalion (81mm Mod. 35 mortars)
  - CLIII Mixed Engineer Battalion
    - 153rd Engineer Company
    - 253rd Telegraph and Radio Operators Company
  - 153rd Anti-tank Company (47/32 mod. 35 anti-tank guns)
  - 153rd Medical Section
    - 2 × Field hospitals
    - 1 × Surgical unit
  - 153rd Supply Section
  - 1118th Transport Section

Attached to the division in 1943:

- 1st Squadron, I Light Tank Group "San Giusto", 1st Cavalry Division "Eugenio di Savoia" (L3/35 tankettes and L6/40 tanks)

== Commanding officers ==
The division's commanding officers were:

- Generale di Divisione Eduardo Quarra Sito (25 November 1941 - 9 March 1943)
- Generale di Divisione Vincenzo Giardina (10 March 1943 - 12 September 1943)
