= Kutna, Trebnje =

Former village in Lower Carniola, Slovenia

Kutna
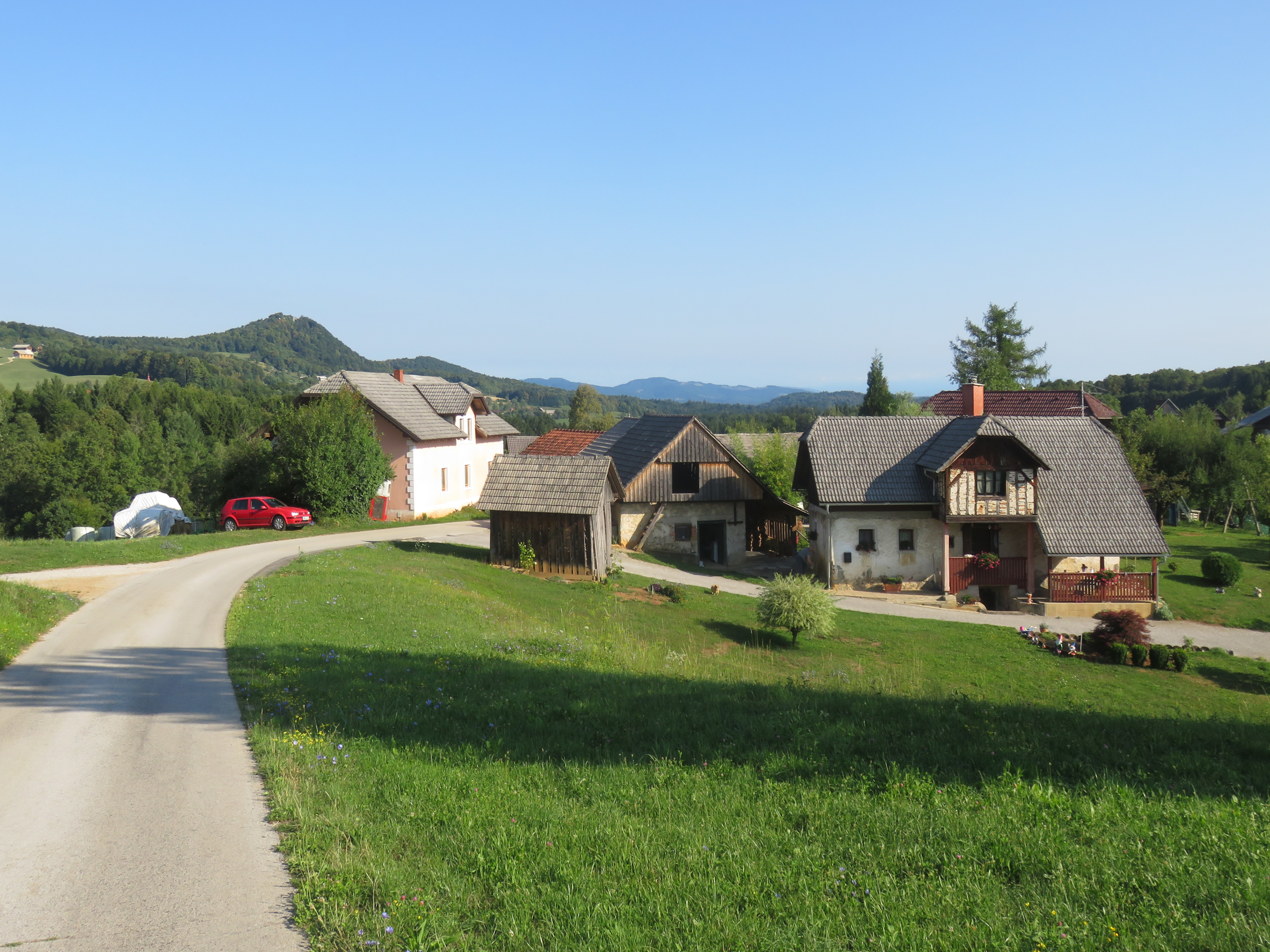

- Location in Slovenia
- Coordinates: 45°52′23″N 14°55′06″E
- Country: Slovenia
- Traditional region: Lower Carniola
- Statistical region: Southeast Slovenia
- Municipality: Trebnje
- Elevation: 368 m (1,207 ft)

Kutna (pronounced [ˈkuːtna]) is a former village in eastern Slovenia in the Municipality of Trebnje. It is now part of the village of Replje. It is part of the traditional region of Lower Carniola and is now included in the Southeast Slovenia Statistical Region.

== Geography ==
Kutna is located south of the village center of Replje along a side road to Vrtače. It stands on a small hill with many sinkholes.

== Name ==
Kutna was attested in historical sources as Khuting in 1385 and Kutina in 1505.

== History ==
Kutna was annexed by Replje in 1953, ending its existence as a separate settlement.
