= Dolga Vas =

Dolga Vas (English: "Long Village") is a Slovene place name that may refer to:

- Dolga Vas, Kočevje, a village in the Municipality of Kočevje, southeastern Slovenia
- Dolga Vas, Lendava, a village in the Municipality of Lendava, northeastern Slovenia
