= 121st Infantry Regiment "Macerata" =

Inactive Italian Army infantry unit

- 121° Reggimento Fanteria "Macerata"
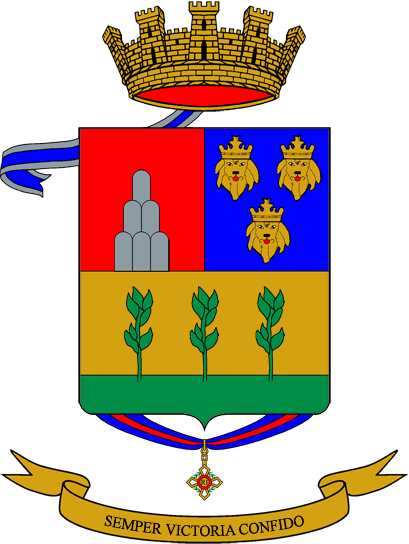
- Regimental coat of arms
- Active: 1 March 1915 – 24 November 1919; 15 Oct 1941 – 12 September 1943; 17 Sep 1992 – 18 September 2000
- Country: Italy
- Branch: Italian Army
- Garrison/HQ: Fano
- Motto: "Semper victoria confido"
- Anniversaries: 27 October 1918 – Battle of Vittorio Veneto
- Decorations: 1× Military Order of Italy; 1× Silver Medal of Military Valor

Insignia
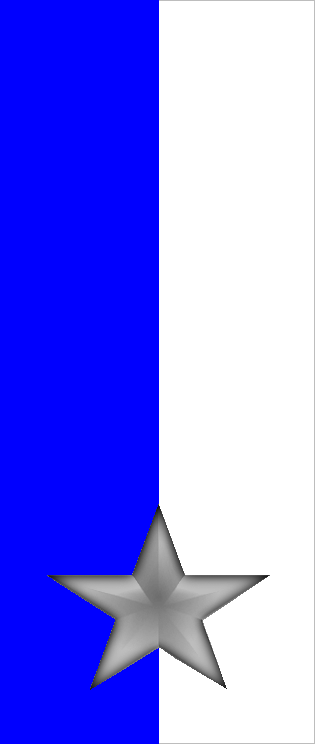
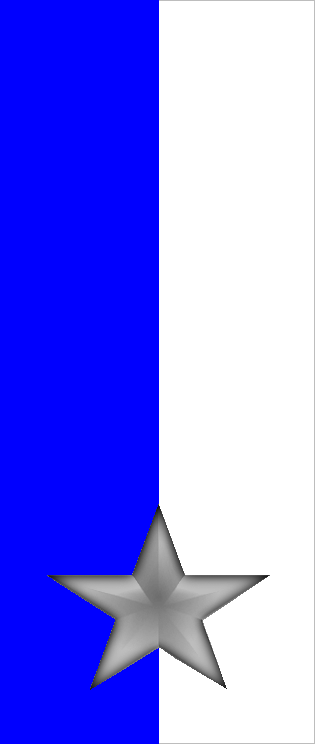
- Regimental gorget patches

The 121st Infantry Regiment "Macerata" (Italian: 121° Reggimento Fanteria "Macerata") is an inactive unit of the Italian Army last based in Fano. The regiment is named for the city of Macerata and part of the Italian Army's infantry arm.

The regiment was formed in preparation for Italy's entry into World War I. During the war the regiment fought on the Italian front and was disbanded once the war concluded. The regiment was reformed during World War II and assigned to the 153rd Infantry Division "Macerata". The division was in Slovenia, when the Armistice of Cassibile was announced on 8 September 1943. Soon thereafter the division and regiment were disbanded by invading German forces. In 1992 the regiment was reformed as a battalion sized training unit in Fano, which remained active until 2000.

== History ==
=== Formation ===
On 1 March 1915 the 121st Infantry Regiment (Brigade "Macerata") was formed in Ancona by the regimental depot of the 93rd Infantry Regiment (Brigade "Messina"). On the same date the command of the Brigade "Macerata" and the 124th Infantry Regiment (Brigade "Macerata") were formed in Macerata by the regimental depot of the 12th Infantry Regiment (Brigade "Casale"). Both regiments consisted of three battalions, which each fielded four fusilier companies and one machine gun section. The Brigade "Macerata" formed, together with the Brigade "Sassari", the 25th Division.

=== World War I ===
During World War I the Brigade "Macerata" fought on the Italian front: in July and August 1915 the brigade fought in the Second Battle of the Isonzo on the Karst Plateau near Polazzo and on the slopes of Monte Sei Busi. In November of the same year fought in the Fourth Battle of the Isonzo at Castelnuovo del Carso. In August 1916 the brigade fought in the Sixth Battle of the Isonzo at Doberdò and Opatje Selo. In February 1917 the infantry regiments of the Brigade "Macerata" ceded both two companies to help from the infantry regiments of the newly formed Brigade "Gaeta". During the same year the Brigade "Macerata" was transferred to the Val Lagarina valley, where it remained until March 1918, when the brigade was transferred to the Monte Altissimo di Nago. In June 1918 the brigade moved to the Piave river front for the Second Battle of the Piave River, during which the brigade held the front at San Biagio di Callalta and Rovaré. In October 1918 the brigade fought in the Battle of Vittorio Veneto and after the breakthrough through the Austro-Hungarian lines advanced to the Livenza and then Tagliamento rivers.

For their conduct during the last year of the war both regiments of the brigade were awarded a Silver Medal of Military Valor. After the war the brigade and its two regiments were disbanded on 24 November 1919.

=== World War II ===
After Italy's entry into World War II the two regiments of the Brigade "Macerata" were reformed by the regimental depots of the 56th Infantry Division "Casale": the 121st Infantry Regiment "Macerata" was reformed on 15 October 1941 in Forlì by the depot of 11th Infantry Regiment "Casale", while the 122nd Infantry Regiment "Macerata" was reformed on 14 August 1941 in Cesena by the depot of the 12th Infantry Regiment "Casale". On 25 November 1941 the two regiments were assigned to the 153rd Infantry Division "Macerata", which also included the newly formed 153rd Artillery Regiment "Macerata", which had been formed by the 56th Artillery Regiment "Casale" in Rimini. The two infantry regiments consisted of a command, a command company, three fusilier battalions, a cannons company equipped with 47/32 anti-tank guns, and a mortar company equipped with 81mm Mod. 35 mortars.

In June 1942 the Macerata division was deployed to occupied Slovenia on anti-partisan duty. In May 1943 the division moved to Croatia. The division was deployed between Delnice and Ogulin when the Armistice of Cassibile was announced on 8 September 1943. After the announcement the division retreated towards Rijeka, where it was disbanded on 12 September by invading German forces.

=== Recent times ===
On 17 September 1992 the 2nd Battalion of the 28th Infantry Regiment "Pavia" in Fano was transferred to the reformed 121st Regiment "Macerata" and assigned the flag and traditions of the 121st Infantry Regiment "Macerata". The regiment consisted of a command, a command and services company, and a battalion with two recruits companies. On 15 September 1993 the regiment was assigned to the Mechanized Brigade "Friuli" and replaced the 225th Regiment "Arezzo" as the brigade's recruits training unit.

On 18 September 2000 the regiment was disbanded and the flag of the regiment transferred to the Shrine of the Flags in the Vittoriano in Rome.
