= Mozelj =

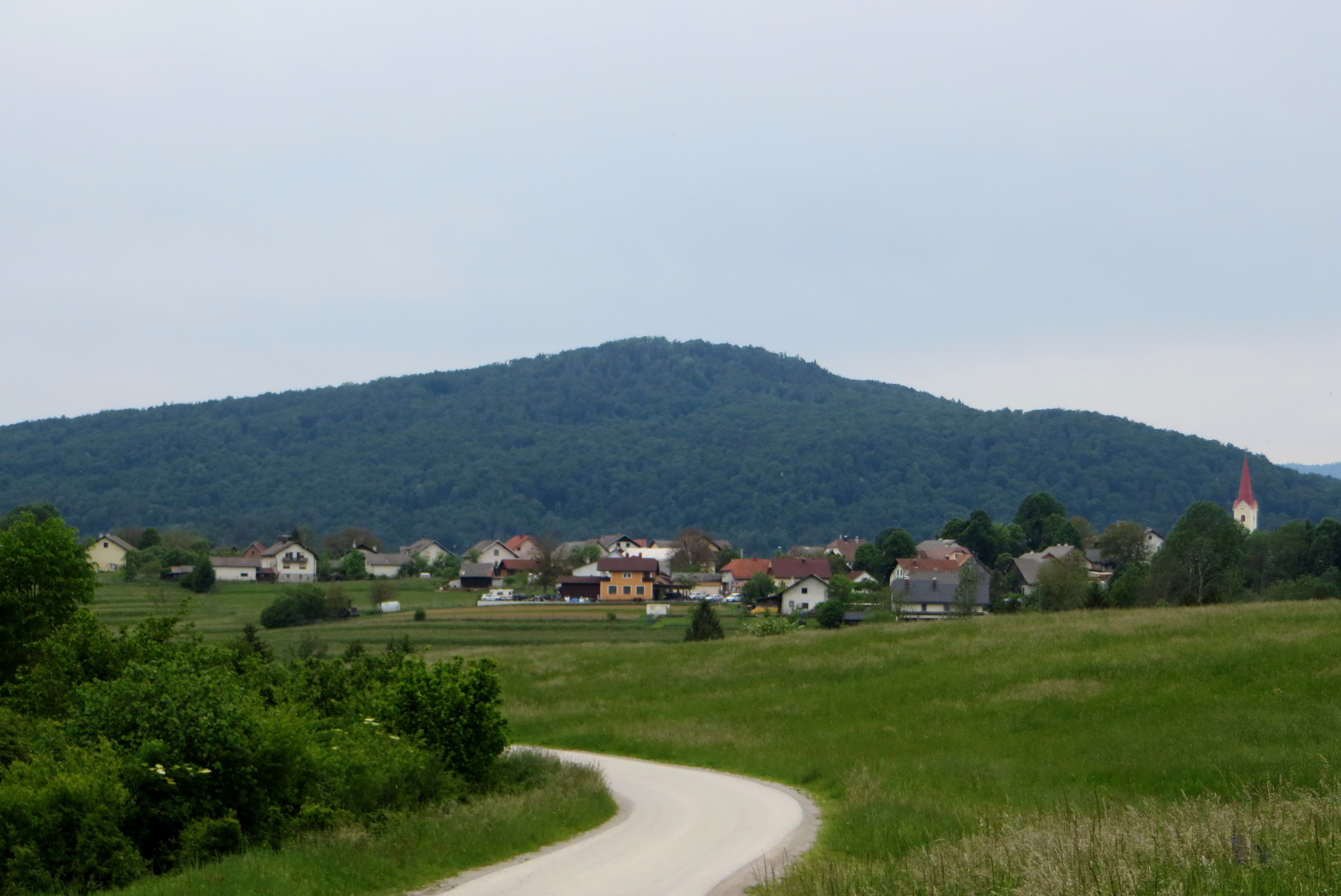

- Location in Slovenia
- Coordinates: 45°35′10.17″N 14°56′3.25″E
- Country: Slovenia
- Traditional region: Lower Carniola
- Statistical region: Southeast Slovenia
- Municipality: Kočevje

Area
  - Total: 12.45 km^{2} (4.81 sq mi)
- Elevation: 499.3 m (1,638 ft)

Population (2002)
  - Total: 184
- Postal code: 1330

Mozelj (pronounced [ˈmoːzəl]; sometimes Gorenji Mozelj, German: Obermösel or Mösel) is a settlement in the Municipality of Kočevje in southern Slovenia. It was a village inhabited mostly by Gottschee Germans. During the Second World War its original population was expelled. The area is part of the traditional region of Lower Carniola and is now included in the Southeast Slovenia Statistical Region.

== Name ==
Mozelj was attested in the land registry of 1574 as Obermössl. The Slovene name Mozelj is based on German Obermösel. This, in turn, is believed to be a diminutive of Moos 'low-lying, damp ground; swamp'. The German name Obermösel literally means 'upper Mösel' and distinguished the settlement from neighboring Niedermösel (literally, 'lower Mösel'), today known as Kočarji.

== History ==
According to the land registry of 1574, Mozelj had 10 full farms subdivided into 20 half-farms. The village was under obligation to provide shingling for Friedrichstein Castle (Slovene: Fridrihštajn) and the town hall in Kočevje. An order of 1614 forbade the residents from cutting trees on Skorten Hill to the southwest, where the wood was reserved for the needs of defense against Ottoman attacks. A part-time school was established in a private house in Mozelj in 1811, and the first school building was built in 1844.Before the Second World War, Mozelj had 65 houses and a majority population of Gottschee Germans. As retaliation for a nearby Partisan ambush on 5 May 1942 in which 13 Italian soldiers were killed, in June 1942 Italian forces burned the entire village except for 13 houses in the center, where they had set up a base. The Mozelj volunteer fire department became a founding unit of the Kočevje municipal fire department on 28 August 1955.

=== Mass grave ===
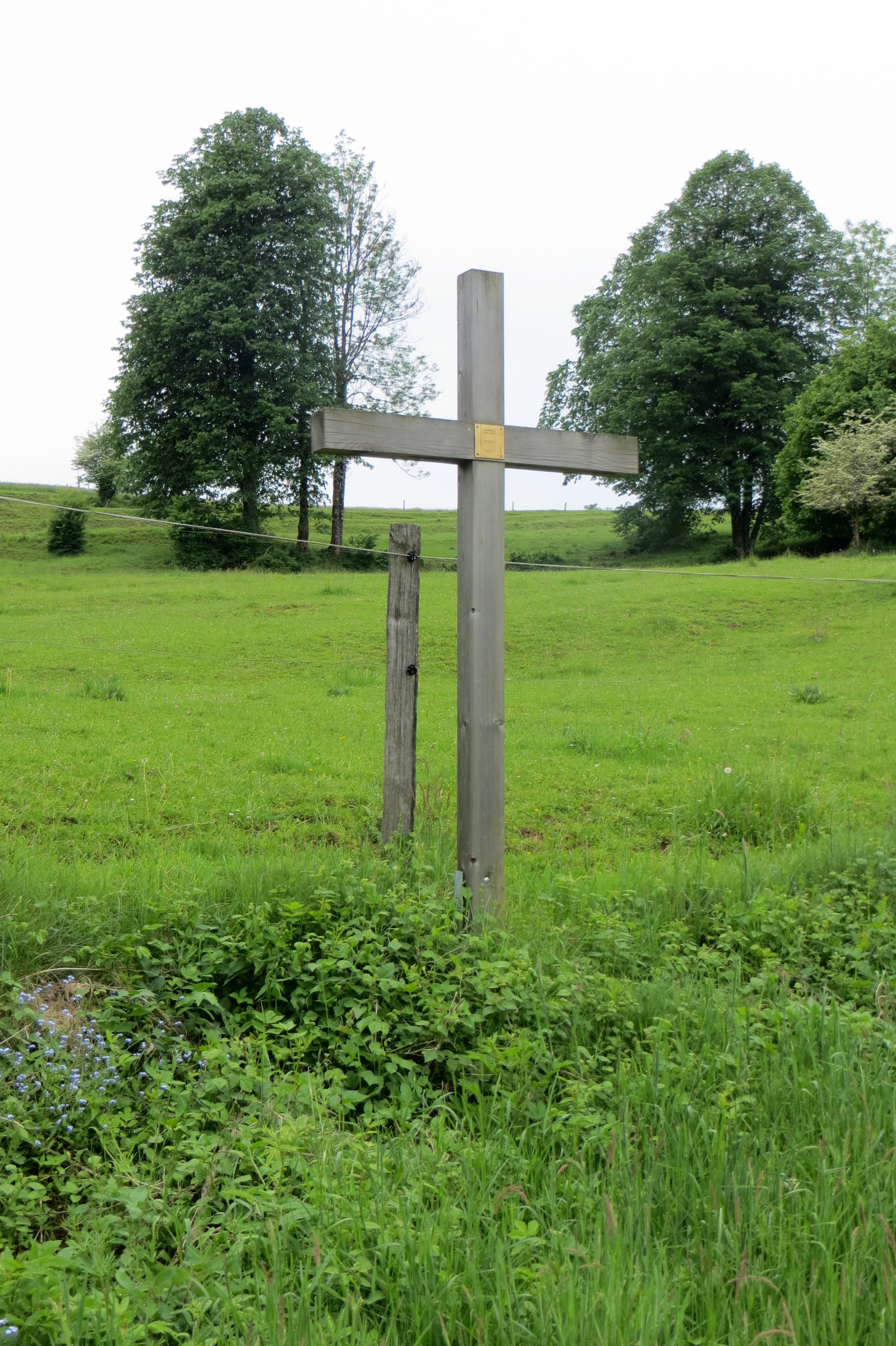
Mozelj Mass Grave

Mozelj is the site of a mass grave associated with the Second World War. The Mozelj Mass Grave (Slovene: Grobišče Mozelj) is located north of the settlement in a sinkhole in a pasture. It contains the remains of 110 victims (including 85 Chetnik soldiers) shot between 12 and 18 October 1943, as well as four additional persons killed on 20 October.

== Churches ==
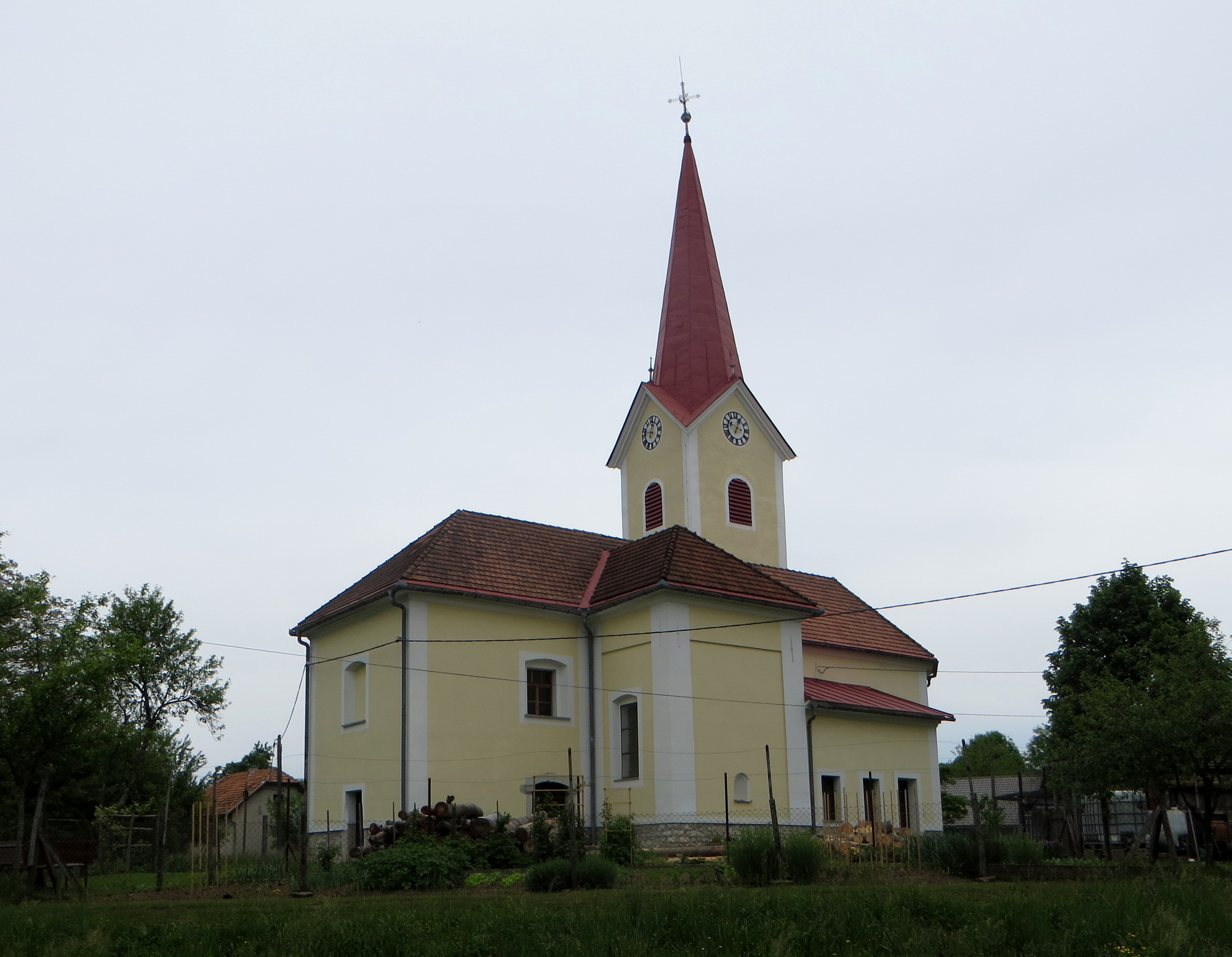
View from south

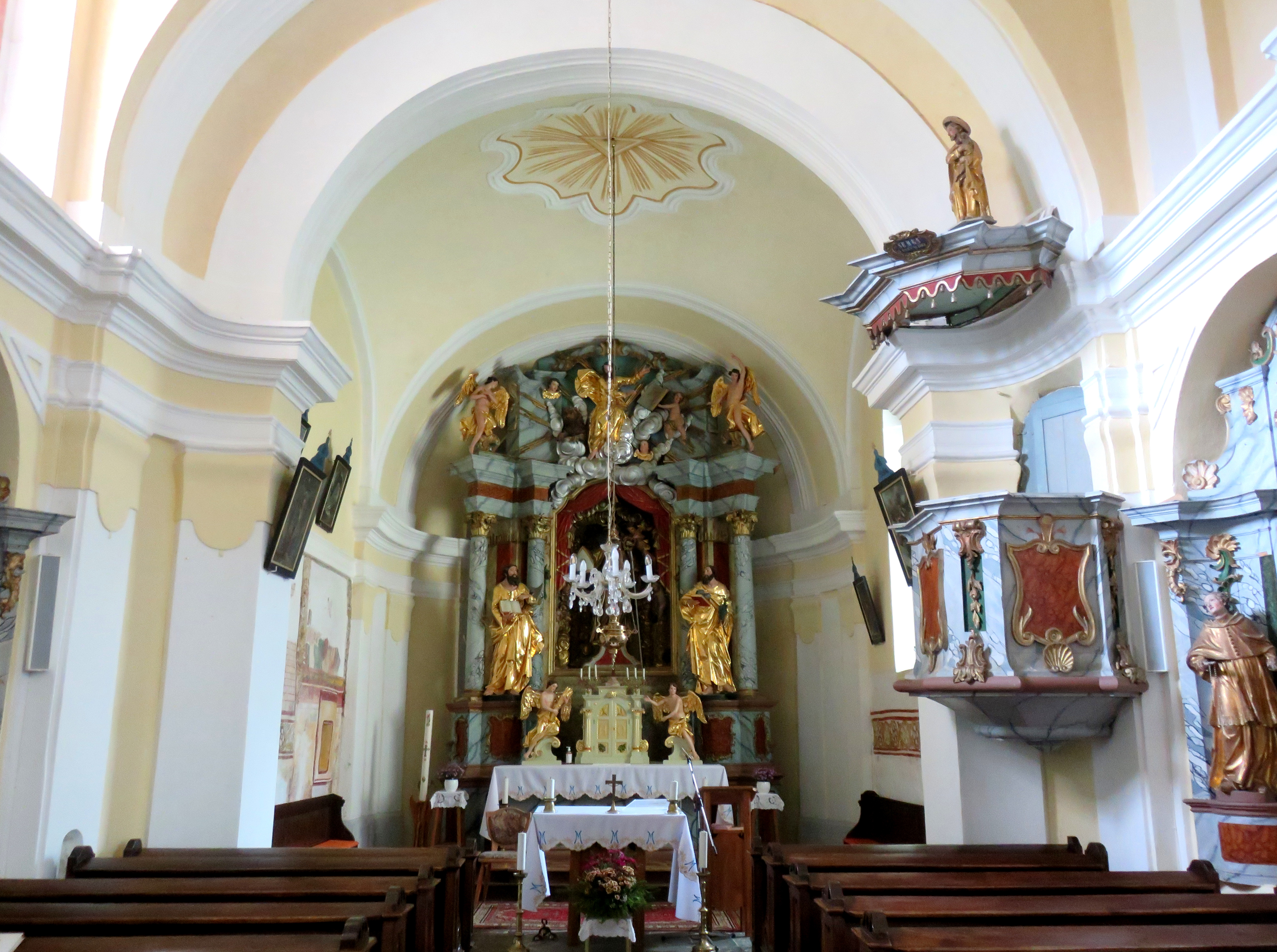
Interior

Saint Leonard's Church

The local parish church, dedicated to Saint Leonard, belongs to the Roman Catholic Diocese of Novo Mesto. It was first mentioned in written documents dating to 1360. The original structure was damaged in the 1511 Idrija earthquake and a new church was built in 1520. It was surrounded by a double fortified wall with defensive towers to protect against Ottoman attacks, with granaries above and cellars below, and a single entrance accessed by a drawbridge over a moat. The internal wall was razed in 1844 and the rubble was used to build a schoolhouse. The external wall was lowered to the level of the cemetery wall in 1856 and then removed entirely when the cemetery was abandoned. The current church has a Baroque character built on a Gothic structure. Two chapels were added to the nave in 1720 and the interior of the church was reworked and refurnished in the Baroque style. The bell tower was increased in height, and towards the end of the 19th century it was outfitted with a neo-Gothic metal roof. The main altar is a high-Baroque wooden work; an inscription indicated that it was created in 1764 by Franz Fajenz and Anton Kastelec, and renovated in 1865 by Leopold Goetzl. The side altars in the nave are in the Rococo style. The stone baptismal basin bears the year 1642, and one bell dates from 1769. Mozelj was elevated to a parish in 1509.

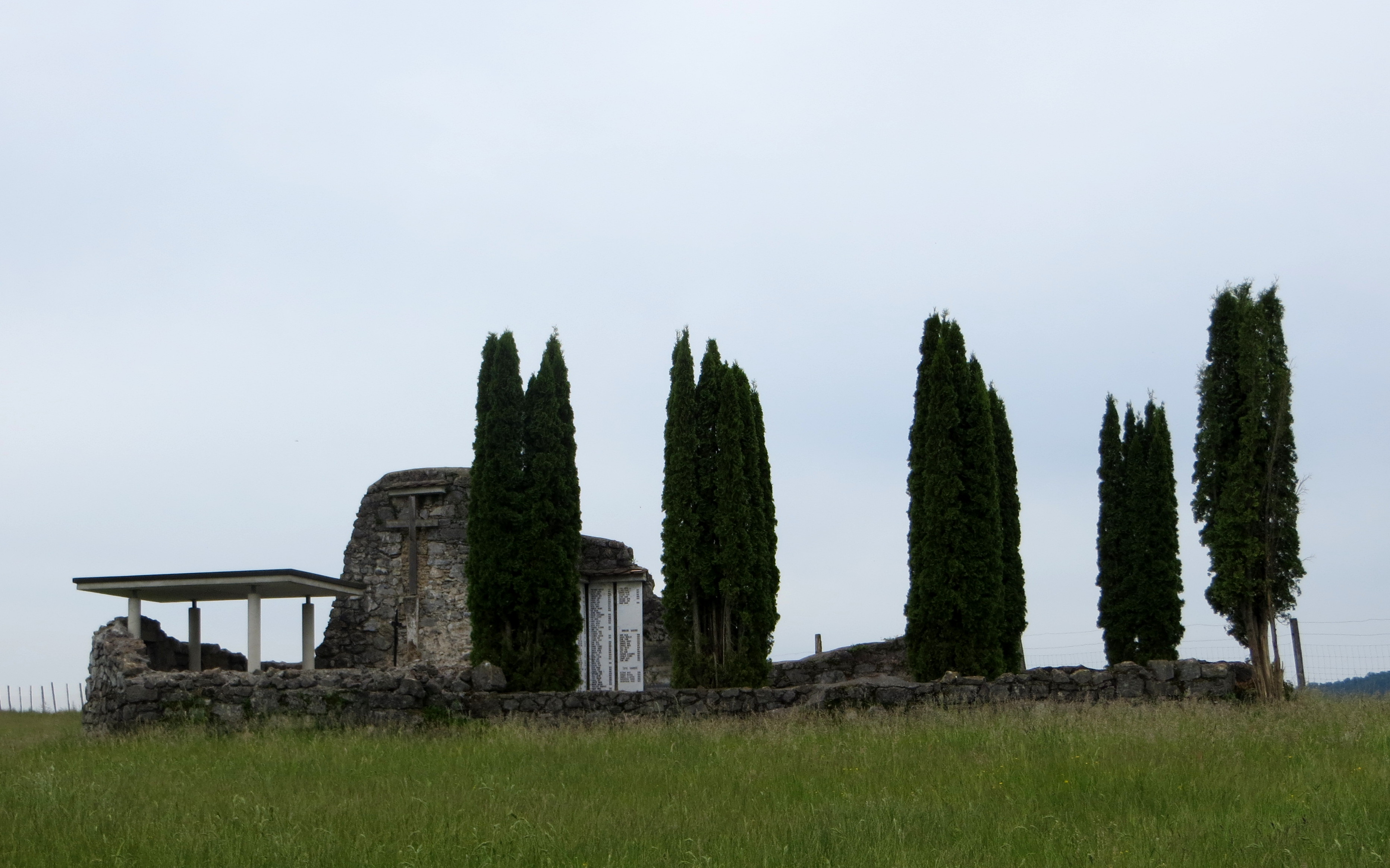
Precious Blood Chapel

The ruins of Precious Blood Chapel stand west of the town. The chapel was built in 1589 and was reworked in 1866, 1912, and 1926. The chapel was used to store hay after the Second World War, and it was then destroyed in 1954. The ruins of the chapel were rearranged in 1994 into a monument to local people killed by the Partisans, Germans, and Italians during the Second World War.
