= 56th Infantry Division "Casale" =

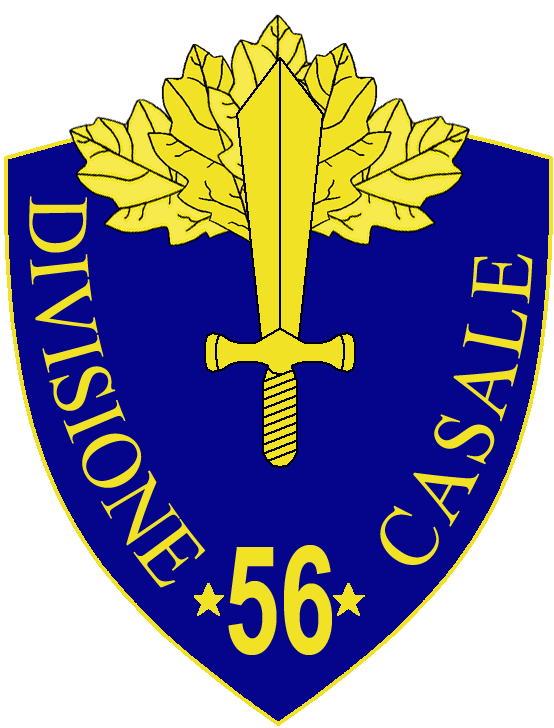
- 56th Infantry Division "Casale" insignia
- Active: 1939–1943
- Country: Kingdom of Italy
- Branch: Royal Italian Army
- Type: Infantry
- Size: Division
- Garrison/HQ: Forlì
- Engagements: World War II

Commanders
- Notable commanders: General Enea Navarini

Insignia
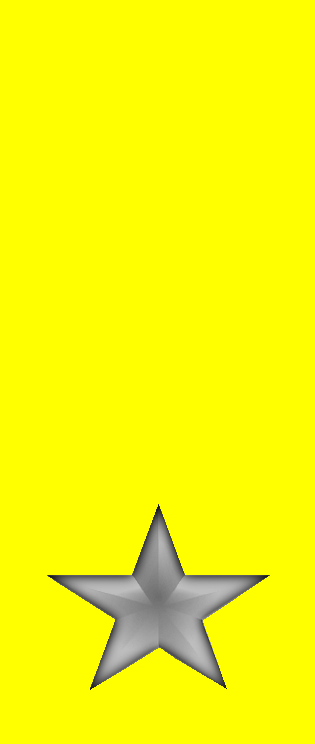
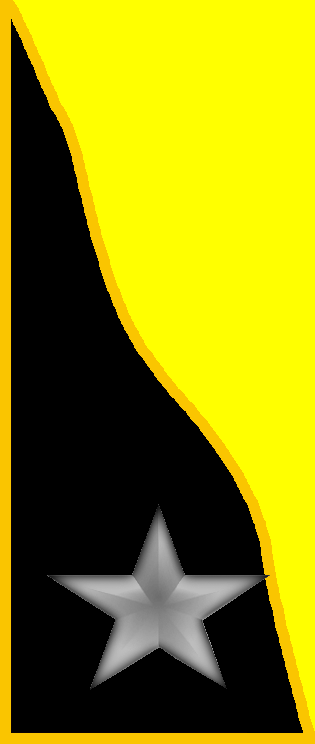
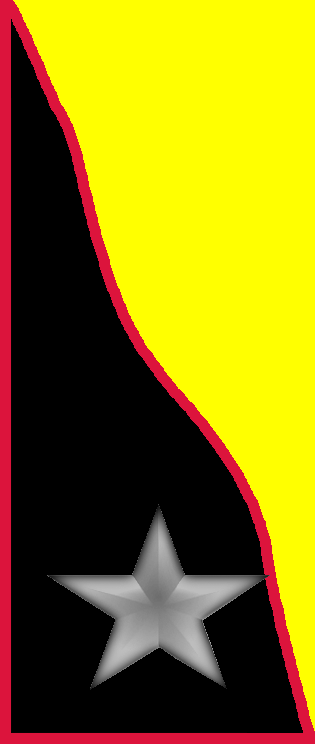
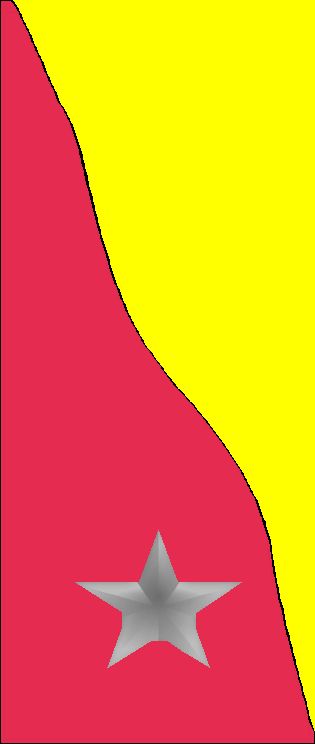
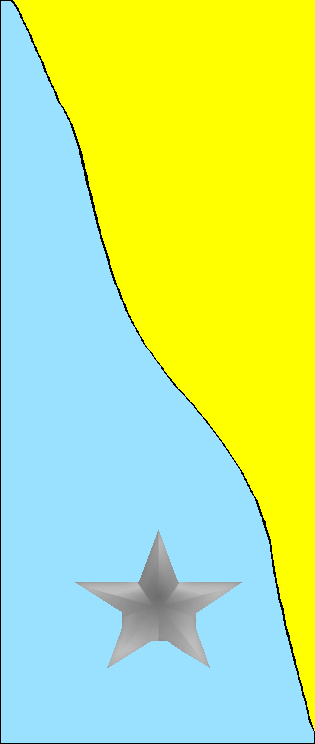
- Identification symbol: Casale Division gorget patches

The 56th Infantry Division "Casale" (Italian: 56ª Divisione di fanteria "Casale") was an infantry division of the Royal Italian Army during World War II. The Casale was activated on 15 June 1939 in Forlì and named for the city of Casale Monferrato and recruited most its men from the Romagna region. The division was sent to Greece as occupation and force. There the division was disbanded by invading German forces in the Aetolia-Acarnania region of Greece after the announcement of the Armistice of Cassibile on 8 September 1943.

== History ==
The division's lineage begins with the Brigade "Casale" established on 21 December 1821, which on 25 October 1831 split to form the 1st and 2nd infantry regiments under the brigade's command. On 4 May 1839 the two regiments were re-numbered as 11th and 12th infantry regiments.

=== World War I ===
The brigade fought on the Italian front in World War I. On 28 October 1926 the brigade command was disbanded and the brigade's two regiments were transferred to other brigades: the 11th Infantry Regiment "Casale" to the XVII Infantry Brigade and the 12th Infantry Regiment "Casale" to the XII Infantry Brigade.

On 24 May 1939 the 12th Infantry Regiment "Casale" in Trieste changed its name to 73rd Infantry Regiment "Lombardia" and joined the newly activated 57th Infantry Division "Lombardia". On the same date a new 12th Infantry Regiment "Casale" was raised in Cesena. On 15 June 1939 the 56th Infantry Division "Casale" was activated in Forlì and received its two namesake infantry regiments and the newly raised 56th Artillery Regiment "Casale".

=== World War II ===
On 14 March 1941 the Casale left Italy for Albania to reinforce the failing Italian Spring Offensive during the Greco-Italian War. The division immediately entered the front in the Shushicë valley. By 20 March 1941 the Casale was assigned to the XXV Army Corps and fought in the Tepelenë area. Contact with retreating Greek forces was lost soon after the start of the Battle of Greece on 6 April 1941, and the Casale engaged in a cautious advance along the Drin river. On 18 April 1941 the Casale encountered a Greek rearguard at Lumi i Kardhiqit, and by 19 April 1941 the division had reached Gjirokastër. On 22 April 1941 the division reached the Greek border near Delvinaki, where it met with German patrols. Afterwards the division was used for mopping-up operations in Greece in the area of Zitsa, Negrades, and Paramythia.

While the 56th Infantry Division "Casale" was on occupation duty in Greece the division's regimental depots in Italy raised the 153rd Infantry Division "Macerata": the depot of the 11th Infantry Regiment "Casale" raised the 121st Infantry Regiment "Macerata", the depot of the 12th Infantry Regiment "Casale" raised the 122nd Infantry Regiment "Macerata", and the depot of the 56th Artillery Regiment "Casale" raised the 153rd Artillery Regiment "Macerata".

After this task was completed the Casale was moved to the south of the Ambracian Gulf and established garrisons in Agrinio, Amfilochia and Missolonghi. The division performed several anti-partisan raids in Agrinio, Kato Achaia, Chrysovitsa, and other locations. After the announcement of the Armistice of Cassibile on 8 September 1943, parts of the 11th Infantry Regiment joined Greek partisans, while the rest of the division was disbanded by German forces.

== Organization ==
56th Infantry Division "Casale" organization in 1940

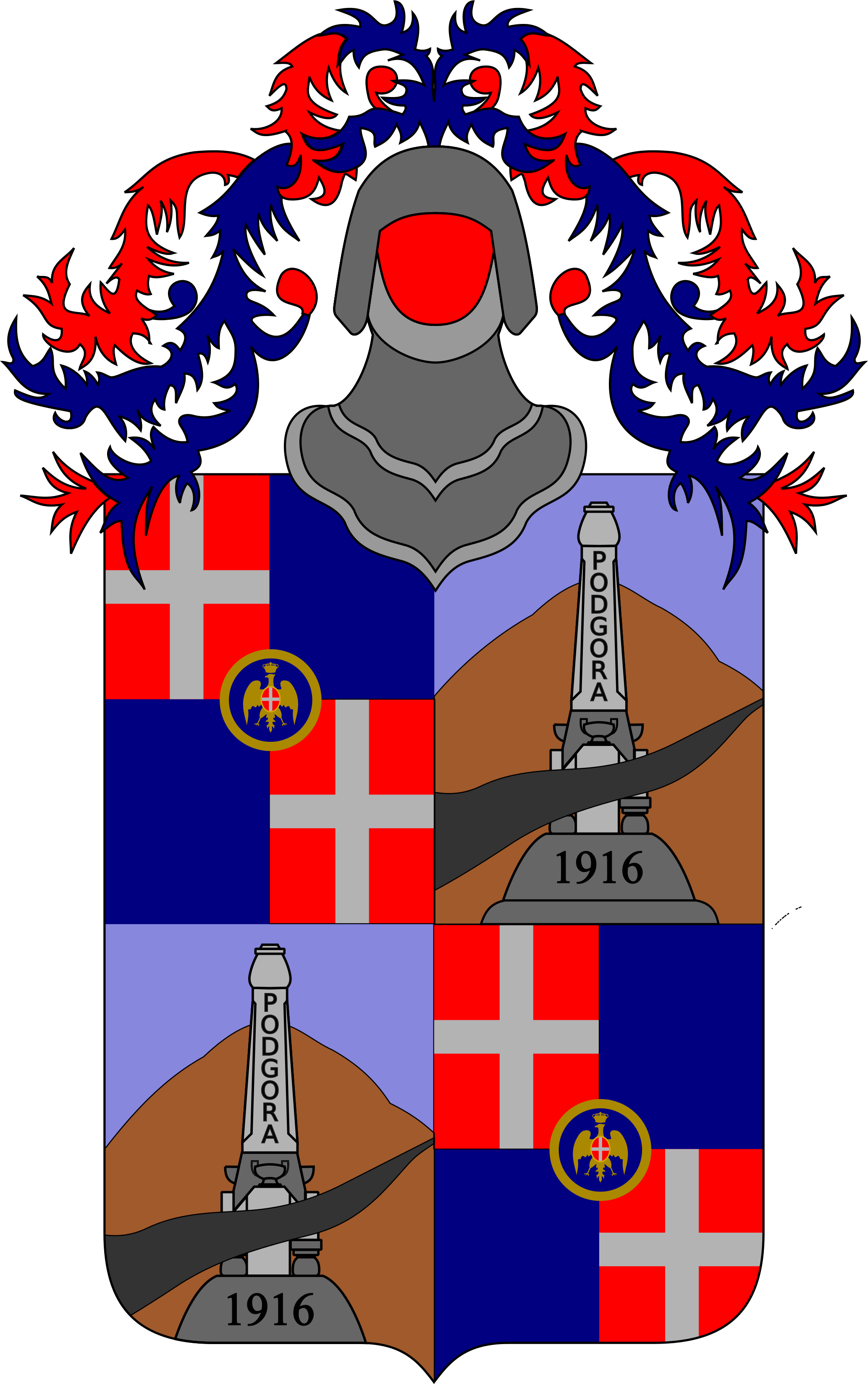
Coat of Arms of the 12th Infantry Regiment "Casale", 1939

- 56th Infantry Division "Casale", in Forlì
  - Headquarters
    - Command Company
    - 48th Carabinieri Section
    - 49th Carabinieri Section
    - 45th Field Post Office
    - 56th Infantry Division Command Transport Squad
  - 11th Infantry Regiment "Casale", in Forlì
    - Command Company
    - 3 × Fusilier battalions
    - Support Weapons Battery (65/17 mod. 13 infantry support guns)
    - Mortar Company (81mm mod. 35 mortars)
  - 12th Infantry Regiment "Casale", in Cesena
    - Command Company
    - 3 × Fusilier battalions
    - Support Weapons Battery (65/17 mod. 13 infantry support guns)
    - Mortar Company (81mm mod. 35 mortars)
  - 311th Infantry Regiment "Casale" (formed on 1 November 1941 by the depot of the 28th Infantry Regiment "Pavia", transferred to the 5th Guardia alla Frontiera Grouping in Slovenia on 27 May 1942)
    - Command Company
    - 3 × Fusilier battalions
    - Cannons Company (47/32 mod. 35 anti-tank guns)
    - Mortar Company (81mm mod. 35 mortars)
  - 56th Artillery Regiment "Casale", in Rimini (formed by the depot of the 26th Artillery Regiment "Pavia")
    - Command Unit
    - I Group (75/27 mod. 06 field guns; transferred from the 11th Artillery Regiment "Ravenna")
    - II Group (75/27 mod. 06 field guns; transferred from the 2nd Artillery Regiment "Messina")
    - III Group (75/13 mod. 15 mountain guns; transferred from the 26th Artillery Regiment "Pavia"; transferred in December 1940 to the 18th Artillery Regiment "Pinerolo")
    - III Group (75/27 mod. 06 field guns; transferred in December 1940 from the 18th Artillery Regiment "Pinerolo"; transferred in March 1941 to the 4th Artillery Regiment "Bergamo")
    - III Group (75/13 mod. 15 mountain guns; transferred in March 1941 from the 4th Artillery Regiment "Bergamo")
    - 1 × Anti-aircraft battery (20/65 mod. 35 anti-aircraft guns)
    - Ammunition and Supply Unit
  - LVI Mortar Battalion (81mm mod. 35 mortars)
  - 56th Anti-tank Company (47/32 mod. 35 anti-tank guns; transferred to the 212th Coastal Division)
  - 156th Anti-tank Company (47/32 mod. 35 anti-tank guns; replaced the 56th Anti-tank Company)
  - 47th Engineer Company
  - 56th Telegraph and Radio Operators Company
  - 60th Medical Section
  - 50th Supply Section
  - 56th Autocarrette Section
  - 156th Transport Section

Attached to the division from early 1941 until early 1942:

- 23rd CC.NN. Legion "Bersaglieri del Mincio"
  - XX CC.NN. Battalion
  - XXXVI CC.NN. Battalion
  - 23rd CC.NN. Machine Gun Company

Attached to the division in 1943:

- CC.NN. Group "Po"
- XXXVI CC.NN. Battalion
- VI Carabinieri Battalion
- II Group, 33rd Artillery Regiment "Acqui" (detached from the 33rd Infantry Division "Acqui")
- CXIX Group (149/13 heavy howitzers; formed by the 9th Army Corps Artillery Regiment)

== Commanding officers ==
The division's commanding officers were:

- Generale di Divisione Enea Navarini (15 June 1939 - 11 July 1941)
- Colonel Giovanni Marioni (acting, 12 July - 5 August 1941)
- Generale di Divisione Mario Maggiani (6 August 1941 - 21 September 1943)
