= 28th Regiment "Pavia" =

Active Italian Army psychological operations unit

- 28° Reggimento "Pavia"
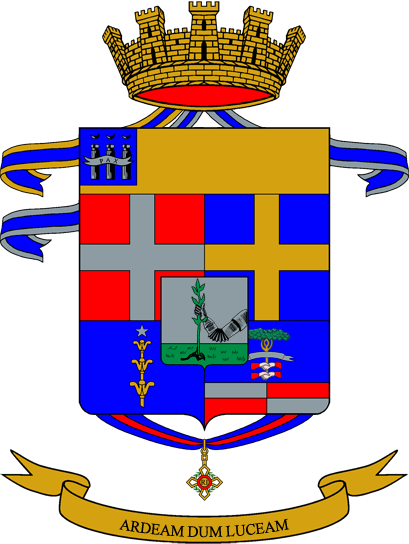
- Regimental coat of arms
- Active: 1 March 1860 – 25 Nov. 1942; 1 July 1958 – today
- Country: Italy
- Branch: Italian Army
- Part of: Tactical Intelligence Brigade
- Garrison/HQ: Pesaro
- Mottos: New: "Dixi Suasi Vici"; Old: "Ardeam dum luceam"
- Anniversaries: 23 July 1866 — Battle of Borgo and Battle of Levico
- Decorations: 1× Military Order of Italy; 1× Gold Medal of Military Valor; 2× Silver Medals of Military Valor; 1× Silver Cross of Army Merit

Insignia
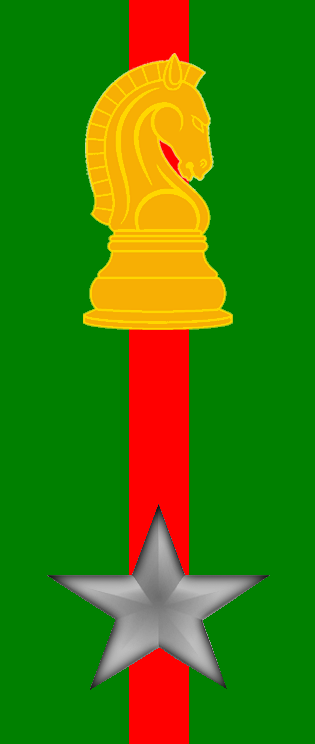
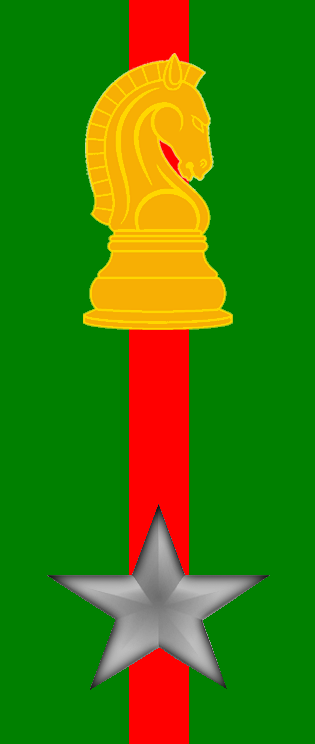
- Regimental gorget patches

The 28th Regiment "Pavia" (Italian: 28° Reggimento "Pavia") is an active unit of the Italian Army based in Pesaro in the Marche. The regiment is named for the city of Pavia and was originally part of the Italian Army's infantry arm. In 2004 the regiment was redesignated as a "multi-arms unit" and became the army's operational communications unit. Since 2022 the regiment is assigned to the Tactical Intelligence Brigade.

The regiment was formed in 1860 by the Royal Sardinian Army. In 1866, the regiment participated in the Third Italian War of Independence and in 1870 in the capture of Rome. During World War I, the regiment fought on the Italian front. During World War II, the regiment was assigned to the 17th Infantry Division "Pavia", with which it fought in the Western Desert Campaign in North Africa. In November 1942, the regiment was destroyed during the Second Battle of El Alamein.

In 1958, the regiment was reformed in Pesaro as a training unit. In 1975, the regiment was disbanded and its flag and traditions assigned to the 28th Infantry Battalion "Pavia", which trained recruits destined for the Mechanized Division "Folgore". In 1991, the 28th Infantry Regiment "Pavia" was reformed and one year later it ceded its 2nd Battalion to help form the 121st Regiment "Macerata". In 1993, the regiment was renamed 28th Regiment "Pavia". In 2002, the regiment began the process to reorganize as a operational communications unit. On 1 March 2004, the regiment concluded its reorganization process and was renamed 28th Regiment "Pavia" (Operational Communications). The regiment's anniversary falls on 23 July 1866, the day of the Battle of Borgo and the night of the Battle of Levico, in both of which the regiment distinguished itself and was awarded Italy's highest military honor the Gold Medal of Military Valor.

== History ==
In 1859, after the Second Italian War of Independence ended with the Treaty of Zürich, the Austrian Empire ceded Lombardy, which at the time was part of the Kingdom of Lombardy–Venetia, to the Second French Empire, which in turn transferred the region to the Kingdom of Sardinia. During the war the Kingdom of Sardinia had also occupied the Grand Duchy of Tuscany, the Duchy of Modena and Reggio, the Duchy of Parma and Piacenza, and the Papal Legations of the Romagne. On 1 March 1860, the Royal Sardinian Army formed a new brigade in Turin, which was immediately sent to Parma, the capital of the Duchy of Parma and Piacenza. The new brigade, named for the city of Pavia in Lombardy, consisted of two infantry regiment, which were formed on the same date. The 27th Infantry Regiment (Brigade "Pavia") was formed with 16 companies ceded by the existing uneven numbered infantry regiments from 3rd to 25th, with the 13th Infantry Regiment (Brigade "Pinerolo"), 19th Infantry Regiment (Brigade "Brescia") and 21st Infantry Regiment (Brigade "Cremona") ceding two companies and the remaining nine uneven numbered regiments ceding one company each. The sixteenth company for the regiment was ceded by the 26th Infantry Regiment (Brigade "Bergamo"). The 28th Infantry Regiment (Brigade "Pavia") was formed with 16 companies ceded by the existing even numbered infantry regiments from 4th to 26th, with the 14th Infantry Regiment (Brigade "Pinerolo"), 20th Infantry Regiment (Brigade "Brescia"), 22nd Infantry Regiment (Brigade "Cremona") and 26th Infantry Regiment (Brigade "Bergamo") ceding two companies and the remaining eight even numbered regiments ceding one company each.

On 5 May 1860, Giuseppe Garibaldi's Expedition of the Thousand set off, with the support of the Sardinian government, from Genoa and landed on 11 May in Marsala in Sicily. On 15 May 1860, Garibaldi won the Battle of Calatafimi and the Sardinian government decided to send reinforcements to Sicily. This triggered the Sardinian campaign in central and southern Italy, during which the 27th Infantry Regiment participated in the siege of Civitella del Tronto. After the successful conclusion of Garibaldi's Expedition of the Thousand the Kingdom of Sardinia annexed the Kingdom of the Two Sicilies and most of the Papal Legations. On 17 March 1861, King Victor Emmanuel II proclaimed himself King of Italy. In 1862–63, the 28th Infantry Regiment's IV Battalion was sent to Campania and then Apulia in Southern Italy to help suppress the anti-Sardinian revolt, which had erupted in Southern Italy after the annexation of the Kingdom of the Two Sicilies.

=== Third Italian War of Independence ===
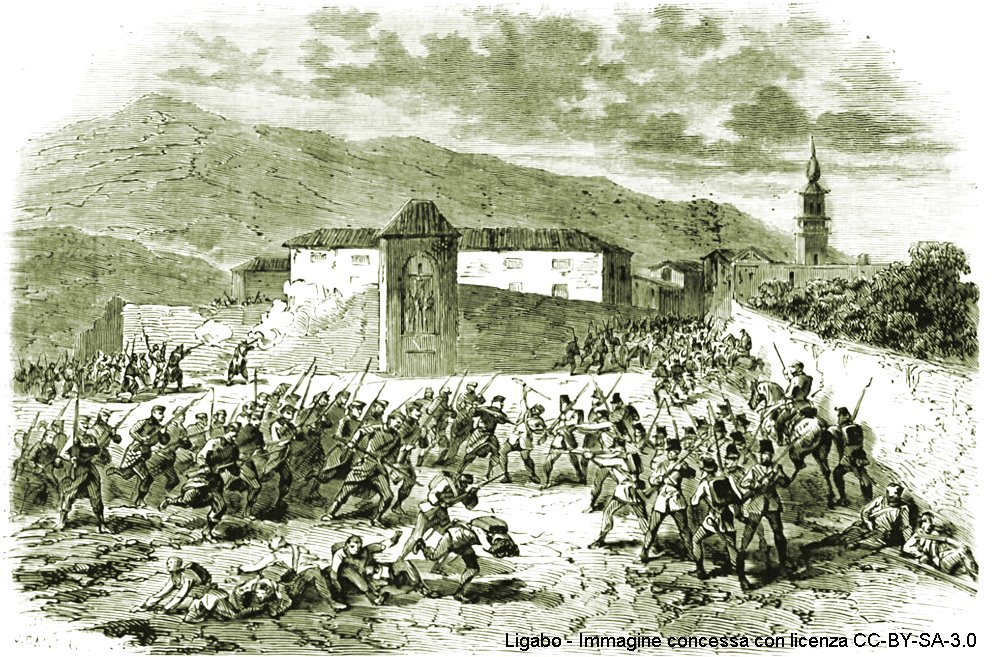
The 28th Infantry Regiment storms Levico in the night of 23 July 1866

On 16 April 1861, the 27th Infantry Regiment and 28th Infantry Regiment ceded each one battalion to help form the 61st Infantry Regiment (Brigade "Sicilia"). On 1 August 1862, the 27th Infantry Regiment and 28th Infantry Regiment ceded their 17th Company and 18th Company to help form the 68th Infantry Regiment (Brigade "Palermo"). In 1866, the Brigade "Pavia" participated in the Third Italian War of Independence, during which the brigade was assigned, together with the Brigade "Sicilia", two lancer squadrons of the Regiment "Lancieri di Milano", the 3rd Bersaglieri Regiment's XXIII and XXV Bersaglieri battalions, and three batteries of the 9th Artillery Regiment, to the 15th Division under General Giacomo Medici. Medici was tasked with invading Trentino from the East through the Valsugana, while Giuseppe Garibaldi's volunteers invaded Trentino from the West. On 23 July 1866, the 15th Division arrived in Borgo Valsugana and a battle ensued against Austrian forces. By nightfall the Austrian had fallen back to Levico, where they were reinforced by two battalions. At 21:30 in the evening the General Medici ordered the 28th Infantry Regiment to attack the Austrian positions and take Levico. By 23:30 in the night the Austrian commander Franz Pichler von Deeben ordered a retreat to Pergine.

For the bravery shown on 23 July 1866 in the Battle of Borgo and the Battle of Levico the 28th Infantry Regiment was awarded Italy's highest military order a Gold Medal of Military Valor. The medal was affixed to the regiment's flag and added to its coat of arms.

In September 1870, the brigade participated in the capture of Rome. On 25 October 1871, the brigade level was abolished, and the two regiments of the Brigade "Pavia" were renamed 27th Infantry Regiment "Pavia", respectively 28th Infantry Regiment "Pavia". On 2 January 1881, the brigade level was reintroduced, and the two regiments were renamed again as 27th Infantry Regiment (Brigade "Pavia") and 28th Infantry Regiment (Brigade "Pavia"). On 1 November 1884, the 28th Infantry Regiment ceded some of its companies to help form the 86th Infantry Regiment (Brigade "Verona"). In 1895–96, the regiment provided eleven officers and 250 enlisted for units deployed to Italian Eritrea for the First Italo-Ethiopian War. In 1911–12, the regiment provided eight officers and 1,114 enlisted for units deployed to Libya for the Italo-Turkish War.

=== World War I ===
At the outbreak of World War I, the Brigade "Pavia" formed, together with the Brigade "Casale" and the 14th Field Artillery Regiment, the 7th Division. At the time the 28th Infantry Regiment consisted of three battalions, each of which fielded four fusilier companies and one machine gun section. In March 1915, the depot of the 28th Infantry Regiment in Ravenna formed the 120th Infantry Regiment, which was assigned on the same date to the newly formed Brigade "Emilia". On 24 May 1915, the day after Italy's entry into the war, the brigade advanced to Lucinico. In June 1915, during the First Battle of the Isonzo, the brigade sent to two battalions of the 27th Infantry Regiment to support the attack of the Brigade "Casale" against the Austro-Hungarian Army's position on Podgora hill. In July 1915, during the Second Battle of the Isonzo, the brigade supported the renewed attacks of the Brigade "Casale" against Podgora: on 20–21 July the 28th Infantry Regiment attacked alongside the "Casale" units and lost more than 600 men, while the 27th Infantry Regiment attacked from 20 to 24 July and lost more than a 1,000 men. In October 1915, the brigade was ordered to attack the Sabotin hill during the Third Battle of the Isonzo. On 21 October 1915, the Brigade "Pavia" and the Brigade "Livorno" attacked the Sabotin, but after four days of fighting the two brigades had to fall back without success. The casualties in these four days amounted to almost 1,500 for the "Pavia" and more than 1,600 for the "Livorno". During the Fourth Battle of the Isonzo the Brigade "Pavia" left the 28th Infantry Regiment's II and III battalions at Lucinico with the Brigade "Casale" for another attack on the Podgora, while the rest of the brigade moved to Oslavia to support the attack of the Brigade "Granatieri di Sardegna" there. In the Fourth Battle of the Isonzo the Brigade "Pavia" suffered nearly 1,500 casualties and had to be taken out of the line.

In August 1916, the Brigade "Pavia" returned to the first line at Lucinico for the Sixth Battle of the Isonzo, which aimed to take the city of Gorizia on the left bank of the Isonzo river. On 6 August 1916, the battle began and the brigade quickly overran the first two Austro-Hungarian trench lines. On 7 August, the troops of the brigade reached the Austro-Hungarian defense guarding the bridges over the Isonzo river. On 8 August, both regiments of the brigade crossed the Isonzo river and established a bridgehead on the left bank, which was expanded by nightfall to the Sant'Andrea quarter of Gorizia. On 9 August, the 28th Infantry Regiment advanced to Vrtojba and took the village. On 10 August, the brigade tried to take the heights behind Vrtojba, which descent to Bilje, but having lost more than 1,500 men by now, the brigade failed to achieve its objectives for the day and two days later the brigade was sent to the rear.

On 5 January 1917, the two regiments of the Brigade "Pavia" were awarded a Silver Medal of Military Valor for having crossed the Isonzo river as the first Italian units. The two medals were affixed to the regiments' flags and added to their coat of arms. In February 1915, the depot of the 27th Infantry Regiment in Rimini formed command of the Brigade "Elba" and the 261st Infantry Regiment for the new brigade, while the depot of the 28th Infantry Regiment in Ravenna formed the 262nd Infantry Regiment for the new brigade. The battalions for the two new regiments were drawn from six existing brigades, whose regiments each ceded two companies. The Brigade "Pavia" spent 1917 on the Asiago plateau, where no events of note occurred during the year.

In March 1918, the brigade moved to Padua, where it remained until the Second Battle of the Piave River on 15 June 1918. Two days later the brigade was ordered to block the expansions of the Austro-Hungarian bridgehead at Fagaré on the Southern bank of the Piave river. The brigade established a defensive line from Bocca Callalta to San Biagio di Callalta, which it held until 21 June, when the brigade, which had suffered more than 1,200 casualties, was replaced in the first line by other units. In August 1918, the brigade was sent to hold the frontline on the Western shore of Lake Garda from Punta Larici to Monte Guil and Monte Carone. During the decisive Battle of Vittorio Veneto the brigade attacked the Austro-Hungarian defensive line that ran from Cima d'Oro to Monte Tomeabrù and Bocca di Trat on 3 November 1918. After breaking through the enemy line the brigade advanced to Ponte Arche, where the news of the Armistice of Villa Giusti reached it.

=== Interwar years ===
On 20 October 1926, the Brigade "Pavia" was renamed XVII Infantry Brigade. The brigade was the infantry component of the 17th Territorial Division of Ravenna, which also included the 26th Field Artillery Regiment. At the same time the brigade's two infantry regiments were renamed 27th Infantry Regiment "Pavia" and 28th Infantry Regiment "Pavia". On 28 October 1926, the Brigade "Casale" was disbanded and the brigade's 11th Infantry Regiment "Casale" assigned to the XVII Infantry Brigade.

In 1934, the 17th Territorial Division of Ravenna was renamed 17th Infantry Division "Rubicone". A name change that also extended to the division's infantry brigade. In 1935–36 the 28th Infantry Regiment "Pavia" provided 30 officers and 860 troops to units deployed to East Africa for the Second Italo-Ethiopian War. On 27 April 1939, the XVII Infantry Brigade "Rubicone" was disbanded and the 11th Infantry Regiment "Casale" transferred to the 56th Infantry Division "Casale". On the same date the 17th Infantry Division "Rubicone" was renamed 17th Infantry Division "Pavia" and the 26th Field Artillery Regiment was renamed 26th Artillery Regiment "Pavia". During the same year "Pavia" division moved to Gharyan in Libya.

=== World War II ===
At the outbreak of World War II, the 28th Infantry Regiment "Pavia" consisted of a command, a command company, three fusilier battalions, a support weapons battery equipped with 65/17 infantry support guns, and a mortar company equipped with 81mm Mod. 35 mortars. In June 1940, during the Italian invasion of France the "Pavia" division was deployed along the French Tunisian-Libyan border. After the signing of the Franco-Italian Armistice the division returned to its bases. On 9 September 1940, when the Italian 10th Army invaded Egypt, the "Pavia" division remained at its bases. On 9 December 1940, the British Western Desert Force began Operation Compass, which quickly overran and annihilated the 10th Army's division. The 26th Artillery Regiment "Pavia" was sent to Cyrenaica to reinforce the remaining units of the 10th Army, which was annihilated on 6–7 February 1941 in the Battle of Beda Fomm.

The Pavia division then received the 3rd Fast Artillery Regiment "Principe Amedeo Duca d'Aosta" of the 3rd Cavalry Division "Principe Amedeo Duca d'Aosta" as new artillery regiment. In March 1941, the division left its bases to participate in the German-Italian Operation Sonnenblume, which drove the British forces back to the Libyan-Egyptian border. In May 1941, the reformed 26th Artillery Regiment "Pavia" arrived in Libya and joined the "Pavia" division, while the 3rd Fast Artillery Regiment "Principe Amedeo Duca d'Aosta" was transferred to the 133rd Armored Division "Littorio". In June 1941, the "Pavia" division was sent to participate in the Siege of Tobruk. On 1 November 1941, the depot of the 28th Infantry Regiment in Ravenna formed the 311th Infantry Regiment "Casale" for the 56th Infantry Division "Casale". On 18 November 1942, British Eighth Army began Operation Crusader, which aimed to relieve the Siege of Tobruk. On 27 November British forces broke the siege ring. On 4 December 1941, General Erwin Rommel ordered a withdrawal to the Gazala Line, during which the "Pavia" division left a rearguard at El Adem, which resisted British attacks from 7 to 14 December. On 15 December, the "Pavia" division fought on the Gazala Line against the 2nd New Zealand Division and Polish Carpathian Rifle Brigade. After the loss of the Gazala Line the retreat of the Axis forces quickened. On 17 December 1941 the "Pavia" division fought at Timimi 70 km west of Tobruk, then on the Mechili–Derna, Libya line. The retreat route passed through Marj, Benghazi, and Ajdabiya, finally reaching El Agheila on 24 December, south-west of which the Pavia began to fortify at Bir es Suera on the southern bank of Al Wādī al Fārigh. At this point, the British advance was halted due to logistic problems.

In late January 1942, Axis forces began to push back British forces. On 26 May 1942, the division fought in the Battle of Gazala, which led to the Axis capture of Tobruk. On 27 June 1942, the division reached Bardia and continued to advance to Sollum and ultimately Sidi Barrani. On 1 July 1942, the "Pavia" division reached Dayr al Abyaḑ, to the South of El Alamein. In July 1942, the division fought in the First Battle of El Alamein. During the Battle of Alam el Halfa the "Pavia" division held the frontline to the North of the Italo-German attack. During the Second Battle of El Alamein the division held the southernmost section of the Axis frontline adjacent to the Qattara Depression. On 3 November 1942, the "Pavia" division was allowed to retreat, but the division, together with the 27th Infantry Division "Brescia" and 185th Infantry Division "Folgore", were abandoned without transport by the rest of the retreating Axis forces. The Italians units walked through the desert to Fuka and then to Mersa Matruh, where the division's remnants surrendered to British forces on 7 November 1942. On 25 November 1942, the 17th Infantry Division "Pavia" and its regiments were declared lost due to wartime events.

For their conduct and bravery during the Western Desert Campaign the "Pavia" division's two infantry regiments were both awarded a Silver Medal of Military Valor. The two medals were affixed to the regiments' flags and added to their coat of arms.

=== Cold War ===
On 1 July 1958, the 28th Infantry Regiment "Pavia" was reformed by renaming the existing 6th Recruits Training Center in Pesaro. The regiment consisted of the following units:

- 28 Infantry Regiment "Pavia", in Pesaro
  - Command Company, in Pesaro
  - I Battalion, in Pesaro
  - II Battalion, in Fano
  - III Battalion, in Falconara Marittima

During the 1975 army reform, the army disbanded the regimental level and newly independent battalions were granted for the first time their own flags. On 15 November 1975, the 28th Infantry Regiment "Pavia" and the regiment's II and III battalions were disbanded. The next day the regiment's I Battalion became an autonomous unit and was renamed 28th Infantry Battalion "Pavia". The 28th Infantry Battalion "Pavia" was tasked with training recruits destined for the Mechanized Division "Folgore". On 12 November 1976, the President of the Italian Republic Giovanni Leone assigned with decree 846 the flag and traditions of the 28th Infantry Regiment "Pavia" to the 28th Infantry Battalion "Pavia".

In 1986 the Italian Army abolished the divisional level and brigades, which until then had been under one of the Army's four divisions, came under direct command of the Army's 3rd Army Corps or 5th Army Corps. On 31 October 1986, the Mechanized Division "Folgore" was disbanded and the next day the 28th Infantry Battalion "Pavia" was assigned to the 5th Army Corps.

=== Recent times ===
On 17 September 1991, the 28th Infantry Battalion "Pavia" lost its autonomy and the next day entered the reformed 28th Infantry Regiment "Pavia", which also included a newly formed 2nd Battalion based in Fano. On 17 September 1992, the regiment ceded its 2nd Battalion to help reform the 121st Regiment "Macerata". On 7 January 1993, the 28th Infantry Regiment "Pavia" was renamed 28th Regiment "Pavia".

In 2002, the regiment ended its function as a recruits training unit and began to reorganize as a Psychological Operations unit. On 14 February 2004, the regiment left the Italian Army's infantry arm and became a multi-arms unit. On 1 March 2004, the regiment achieved full operational capability as the Italian Army's PsyOps unit and was renamed 28th Regiment "Pavia" (Operational Communications).

On 1 September 2014, the regiment was assigned to the Army Special Forces Command. In 2022, the regiment was transferred to the Tactical Intelligence Brigade and renamed 28th Regiment "Pavia".

== Organization ==
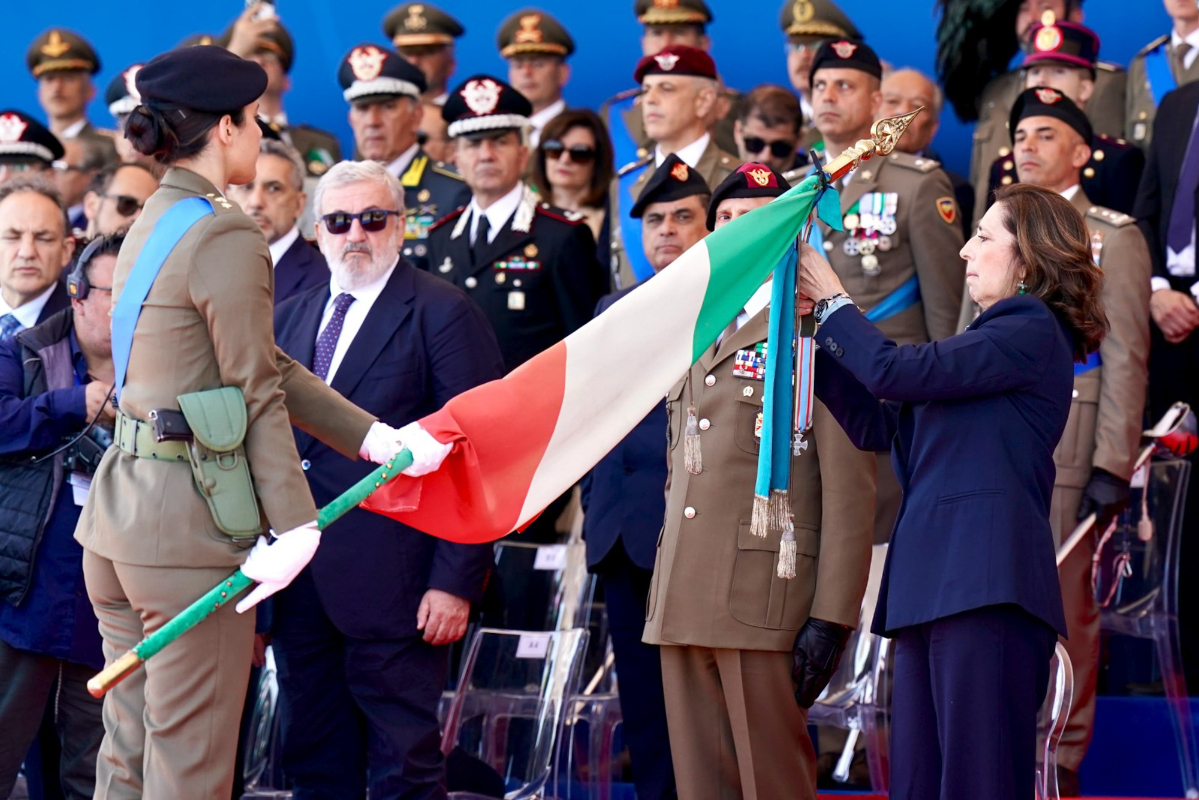
Undersecretary of Defence Isabella Rauti affixes the Silver Cross of Army Merit awarded to 28th Regiment "Pavia" to the regiment's flag

As of 2024 the 28th Regiment "Pavia" consists of the following units:

- 28th Regiment "Pavia", in Pesaro
  - Regimental Command
    - Staff and Personnel Office
    - Operations and Training Office
    - C4I and Media Communications Office
    - Logistic Office
  - 1st Operational Communications Battalion
    - Command Company
    - 1st Internet and Print Media Production Company
    - 2nd TV and Radio Media Production Company
    - Dissemination Company
  - Operational Communications Planning and Development Center
