= 17th Infantry Division "Pavia" =

Infantry division of the Royal Italian Army during World War II

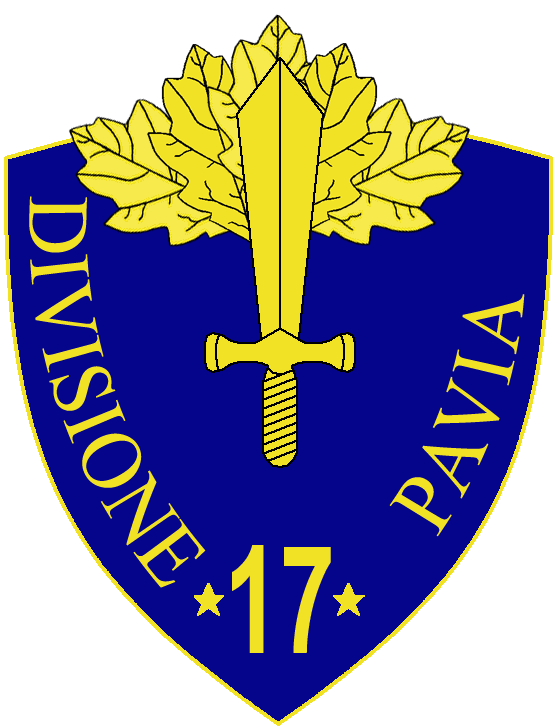
- 17th Infantry Division "Pavia" insignia
- Active: 1939–1942
- Country: Kingdom of Italy
- Branch: Royal Italian Army
- Type: Infantry
- Size: Division
- Part of: Italian XX Corps (1940–1941); Italian X Corps (1941–1942)
- Garrison/HQ: Ravenna
- Engagements: World War II; Operation Compass; Battle of Agedabia; Battle of El Mechili; Siege of Tobruk; Battle of Gazala; Operation Crusader; Second Battle of El Alamein

Insignia
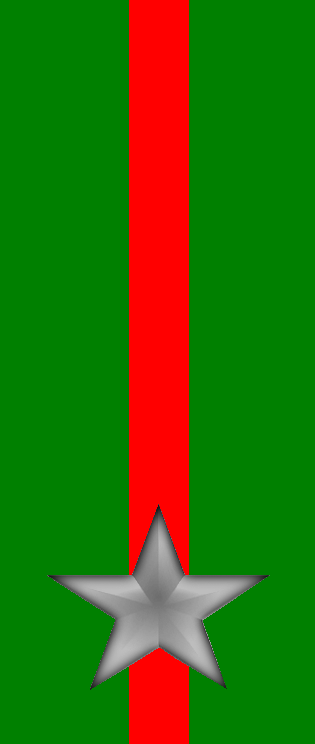
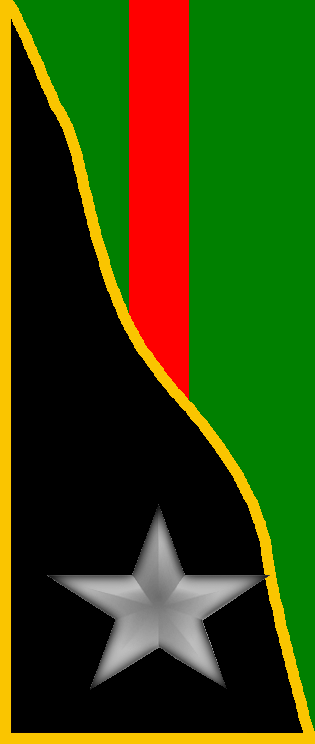
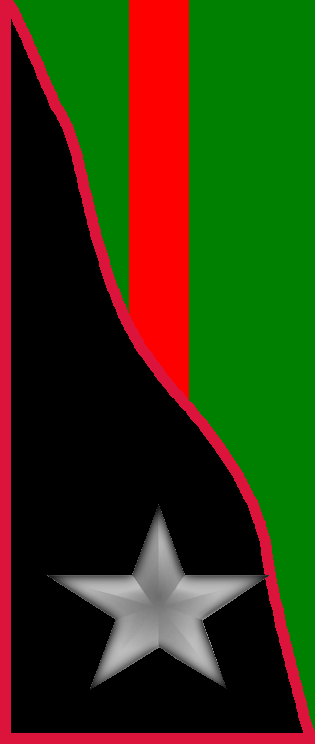
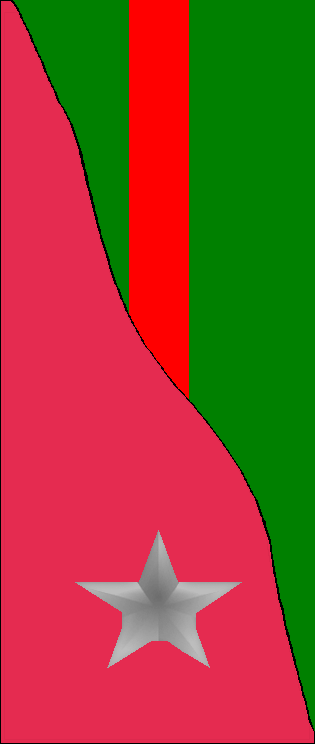
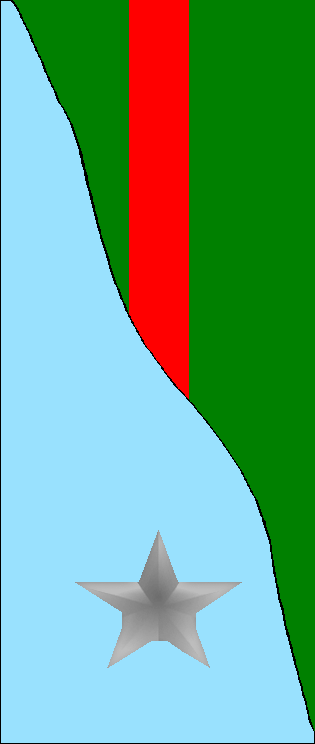
- Identification symbol: Pavia Division gorget patches

The 17th Infantry Division "Pavia" (Italian: 17ª Divisione di fanteria "Pavia") was an infantry division of the Royal Italian Army during World War II. The Pavia was formed in on 27 April 1939 and named after the city of Pavia. The Pavia was classified as an auto-transportable division, meaning it had some motorized transport, but not enough to move the entire division at once. The Pavia had its recruiting area and regimental depots in the Romagna and its headquarters in Ravenna. Its two infantry regiments were based in Cesena (27th) and Ravenna (28th), with the division's artillery regiment based in Ravenna. Shortly after its formation the division was sent to Sabratha in Italian Libya. It participated in the Western Desert campaign and was destroyed during the Second Battle of El Alamein.

== History ==
After the Second Italian War of Independence the Austrian Empire had to cede the Lombardy region of the Kingdom of Lombardy–Venetia to the Kingdom of Sardinia. After taking control of the region the government of Sardinia ordered the Royal Sardinian Army on 29 August 1859 to raise five infantry brigades and one grenadier brigade in Lombardy. Subsequently on 1 March 1860 the Brigade "Pavia" was activated with the newly raised 27th and 28th infantry regiments.

=== World War I ===
The brigade fought on the Italian front in World War I. On 20 October 1926 the brigade assumed the name of XVII Infantry Brigade with the 11th Infantry Regiment "Casale", 27th Infantry Regiment "Pavia", and 28th Infantry Regiment "Pavia". The brigade was the infantry component of the 17th Territorial Division of Ravenna, which also included the 26th Artillery Regiment. In 1934 the division changed its name to 17th Infantry Division "Rubicone". On 24 May 1939 the XVII Infantry Brigade was dissolved with the 27th and 28th infantry regiments coming under direct command of the division, which changed its name to 17th Infantry Division "Pavia". On 15 June 1939, the 11th Infantry Regiment "Casale" joined the newly activated 56th Infantry Division "Casale".

=== World War II ===
==== From Tunisia to Tobruk ====
In 1939, the Pavia was sent to Libya, where it was garrisoned in Sabratha west of Tripoli. During the Italian invasion of France from 10–25 June 1940 the Pavia was deployed along the French Tunisian-Libyan border. After the signing of the Franco-Italian Armistice signed on 24 June 1940 the Pavia returned to its garrison in Gharyan near Tripoli and took up coastal defense duties in the Sabratha–Sorman area.

The Pavia did not participate in the invasion of Egypt in September 1940 and remained in Tripolitania. When the British Operation Compass destroyed the Italian 10th Army in Egypt the Italians sent reinforcements to eastern Libya, including the Pavia's 26th Artillery Regiment. The regiment was destroyed in the Battle of Beda Fomm on 6–7 February 1941 and was replaced by the 3rd Fast Artillery Regiment "Principe Amedeo Duca d'Aosta" of the 3rd Cavalry Division "Principe Amedeo Duca d'Aosta". In March 1941 the Pavia left its bases to participate in the Axis Operation Sonnenblume offensive of March–April 1941. Under Major-General Pietro Zaglio it attacked on 31 March 1941 via the Via Balbia road from Ajdabiya, driving the Australian rearguards back to Mechili, which by 6 April was surrounded. Two Bersaglieri battalions came up in support, along with the advance elements of the German 5th Light Division. On 8 April British General Michael Gambier-Parry surrendered to Axis forces. In the aftermath of the counter-attack, elements of the Pavia were transferred to Sirte to defend an airfield near Wādī Thāmit. In May 1941, the reformed 26th Artillery Regiment "Pavia" arrived in Libya and joined the "Pavia" division, while the 3rd Fast Artillery Regiment "Principe Amedeo Duca d'Aosta" was transferred to the 133rd Armored Division "Littorio". Meanwhile the bulk of Axis forces continued the advance reaching Derna and Martuba by 22 May 1941. In June, the Pavia returned to the front to participate in the Siege of Tobruk and was engaged repeatedly in intense probing attacks carried out by the 9th Australian Division.

==== Operation Crusader ====
On 18 November 1941 the British Operation Crusader commenced and on 19 November a column of British tanks tried to move westwards towards the track that ran up from Bi’r al Ghabī to Al Adm but encountered infantry of the Pavia and were forced to turn back. On 23 November 1941 the British 70th Infantry Division, supported by 60 tanks broke through the line of the nearby 25th Infantry Division "Bologna". The Pavia helped to contain the breakthrough. On 27 November, the 19th New Zealand Battalion leading the 6th New Zealand Brigade, finally linked up with the British 70th Infantry Division at El Duda., weakening the position of the Pavia. Further British attacks were launched on the positions of the Pavia from 3 to 4 December 1941. On 4 December, Rommel ordered a withdrawal to the Gazala Line, which entailed giving up Tobruk. During the withdrawal, the Pavia served as a rearguard at El Adem where it managed a brief but competent defense. The rearguard action continued from 7 until 16 December 1941. The Pavia's rearguard was annihilated on 14 December 1941, when the 22nd New Zealand Battalion encountering weak resistance, apart from two brief counterattacks, and under the cover of darkness took the rearguard's position and 382 Italian prisoners at a cost of 3 killed and 27 wounded. On 15 December, the bulk of the Pavia fought on the Gazala Line against the 2nd New Zealand Division and Polish Carpathian Rifle Brigade, managing to hold its line after a poor initial beginning (with the loss of some hundreds of prisoners), allowing a strong Italian and German armored force to counter-attack and overrun the 1st Battalion, the Buffs.

From this point on the retreat of the Axis forces quickened. On 17 December 1941 the Pavia fought at Timimi 70 km west of Tobruk, then on the Mechili–Derna, Libya line. The retreat route passed through Marj, Benghazi, and Ajdabiya, finally reaching El Agheila on 24 December, south-west of which the Pavia began to fortify at Bir es Suera on the southern bank of Al Wādī al Fārigh. At this point, the British advance was halted due to logistic problems following the rapid advance, giving the Axis forces a quiet time.

==== From Libya to Egypt ====
The Pavia started to advance gradually from late January 1942, returning to its initial positions of 1941 west of Tobruk on 26 May 1942. On 28–29 May 1942, the Pavia helped to encircle residual British forces at Tobruk and Gazala. During the Battle of Gazala, the Pavia was used to mop up British units, taking charge of 6,000 Allied prisoners by 16 June 1942. On 27 June 1942, the division reached Bardia and continued to advance to Sollum and ultimately Sidi Barrani. On 1 July 1942 the Pavia division reached Dayr al Abyaḑ, south of El Alamein. The Pavia fought in the First battle of El Alamein as part of the X Army Corps. During the initial phase of the fighting the Pavia served as rearguard for the 132nd Armored Division "Ariete", where it had an isolated, limited defensive success. A few elements of the Pavia along with the 27th Infantry Division "Brescia" put up a stubborn defense on Ruweisat Ridge on the night of 14–15 July, allowing a German armored force to arrive in time the next day to deliver a counterattack against the attacking New Zealand infantry and British armor. Captain Amalio Stagni and Corporal Ugo Vaia of the Pavia were both awarded a Silver Medal of Military Valor for their leadership during the action on Ruweisat Ridge. The Axis' advance then stalled until 30 August 1942 and attempts to advance were hampered by the Italian units' dwindling supplies and by stiffened British resistance.

During the Second Battle of El Alamein, one battalion of the Pavia fought alongside the 185th Infantry Division "Folgore". The battalion commenced to attack on 24 October 1942, on Qārat al Ḩumaymāt, taking over Naqb al Ralah over the steep El Diffa plateau edge, but failed to hold the majority of the plateau after Allied counterattacks. The British attacks intensified and on 3 November 1942 the Pavia was ordered to retreat from the plateau to the Qattara Depression. At the end of the battle, the Pavia and the other two divisions of X Army Corps were abandoned without transport (mostly useless anyway because of the harsh landscape on the division retreat route) by the rest of the retreating Axis forces on their way to Fūkah and Mersa Matruh on 4 November 1942. The Pavia tried to follow suit, but lost its rearguard at Deir el Nuss to Allied armored units. As a result the Pavia suffered heavy losses while on the march to the Fūkah. At Mersa Matruh, where several of the survivors of the Pavia had regrouped, including its commander, the remnants of the division had no option but to surrender on 7 November 1942. The Pavia division was officially dissolved 25 November 1942.

== Organization ==
=== Auto-transportable North-African-type 40/41 ===
17th Infantry Division "Pavia" organization in 1940

17th Infantry Division "Pavia" organization in 1941

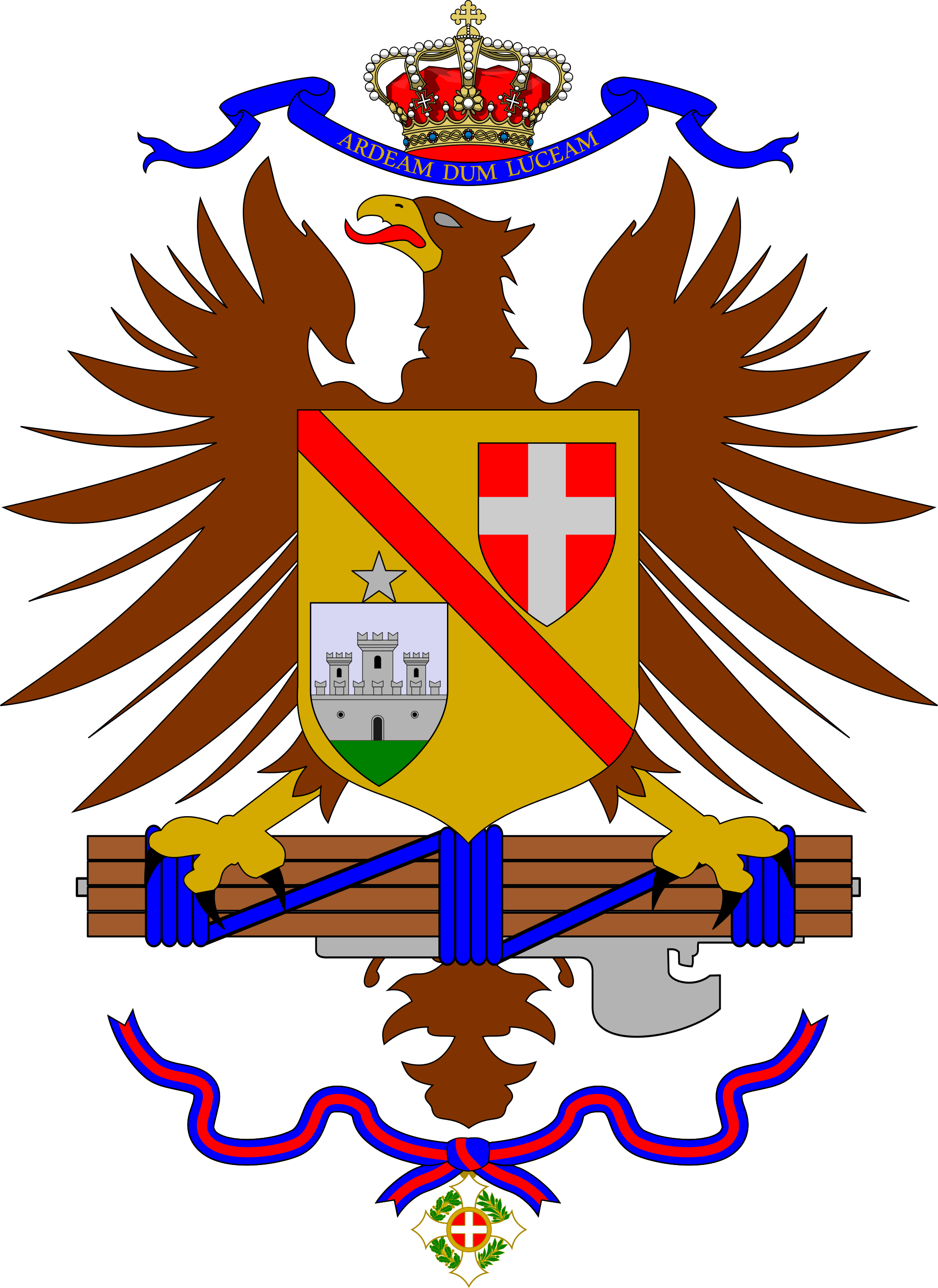
Coat of Arms of the 27th Infantry Regiment "Pavia", 1939

- 17th Infantry Division "Pavia", in Ravenna
  - Headquarters
    - Command Company
    - 679th Carabinieri Section
    - 54th Field Post Office
    - 17th Infantry Division Command Transport Squad
  - 27th Infantry Regiment "Pavia", in Cesena
    - Command Company
    - 3 × Fusilier battalions (the III Fusilier Battalion was reorganized as III Support Weapons Battalion in summer 1941)
      - Command Company, 3 × Fusilier companies, 1 × Weapons Company (Breda M37 heavy machine guns and 45mm mod. 35 mortars)
    - III Support Weapons Battalion (formed in summer 1941)
      - Command Company, 1 × Machine Gun Company (Breda M37 heavy machine guns), 1 × Anti-tank Company (S-18/1000 anti-tank rifles), 1 × Anti-tank Company (47/32 mod. 35 anti-tank guns)
    - Support Weapons Battery (65/17 mod. 13 infantry support guns; re-equipped with 47/32 mod. 35 anti-tank gun and entered the regiment's III Support Weapons Battalion in summer 1941)
    - Mortar Company (81mm mod. 35 mortars)
  - 28th Infantry Regiment "Pavia", in Ravenna
    - Command Company
    - 3 × Fusilier battalions (the III Fusilier Battalion was reorganized as III Support Weapons Battalion in summer 1941)
      - Command Company, 3 × Fusilier companies, 1 × Weapons Company (Breda M37 heavy machine guns and 45mm mod. 35 mortars)
    - III Support Weapons Battalion (formed in summer 1941)
      - Command Company, 1 × Machine Gun Company (Breda M37 heavy machine guns), 1 × Anti-tank Company (S-18/1000 anti-tank rifles), 1 × Anti-tank Company (47/32 mod. 35 anti-tank guns)
    - Support Weapons Battery (65/17 mod. 13 infantry support guns; re-equipped with 47/32 mod. 35 anti-tank gun and entered the regiment's III Support Weapons Battalion in summer 1941)
    - Mortar Company (81mm mod. 35 mortars)
  - 26th Artillery Regiment "Pavia", in Ferrara (destroyed in the Battle of Beda Fomm in February 1941)
    - Command Unit
    - I Group (75/27 mod. 06 field guns)
    - II Group (75/27 mod. 06 field guns; escaped destruction)
    - III Group (100/17 mod. 14 howitzers)
    - 1 × Anti-aircraft Battery (20/65 mod. 35 anti-aircraft guns)
  - 26th Artillery Regiment "Pavia" (reformed in Rimini on 18 April 1941)
    - Command Unit (destroyed during Operation Crusader in fall 1941; reformed in Italy and arrived in Libya in May 1942)
    - I Group (100/17 mod. 14 howitzers; joined the regiment in May 1941; destroyed during Operation Crusader)
    - II Group (75/27 mod. 06 field guns; escaped destruction at Beda Fomm;, destroyed during Operation Crusader)
    - III Group (75/27 mod. 06 field guns; newly formed; destroyed during Operation Crusader)
    - 1 × Anti-aircraft Battery (20/65 mod. 35 anti-aircraft guns)
    - Ammunition and Supply Unit
  - 3rd Fast Artillery Regiment "Principe Amedeo Duca d'Aosta" (attached to the division from February 1941 to May 1941)
    - Command Unit
    - I Group (100/17 mod. 14 howitzers)
    - II Group (100/17 mod. 14 howitzers)
    - III Group (75/27 mod. 06 field guns)
    - IV Group (75/27 mod. 06 field guns)
    - 2 × Anti-aircraft batteries (20/65 mod. 35 anti-aircraft guns)
    - Ammunition and Supply Unit
  - LXIX Machine Gun Battalion (reorganized as Support Weapons Battalion in summer 1941)
  - LXIX Support Weapons Battalion (formed in summer 1941)
    - Command Company, 1 × Anti-tank Company (47/32 mod. 35 anti-tank guns), 1 × Mortar Company (81mm mod. 35 mortars), 1 × Anti-aircraft Battery (20/65 mod. 35 anti-aircraft guns)
  - XVII Replacements Battalion
  - XVII Mixed Engineer Battalion
    - 17th Telegraph and Radio Operators Company
    - 1 × Engineer Company
    - 1 × Searchlight Section
  - 17th Anti-tank Company (47/32 mod. 35 anti-tank guns; destroyed in the Battle of Beda Fomm in February 1941)
  - 34th Anti-tank Company (anti-tank guns; replaced the destroyed 17th Anti-tank Company; entered the LXIX Support Weapons Battalion in summer 1941)
  - 21st Medical Section
    - 66th Field Hospital
    - 84th Field Hospital
    - 1 × Surgical Unit
  - Supply Section
  - 207th Transport Section

The following units were attached to the division during the Western Desert Campaign:

- V Tank Battalion L (L3/35 tankettes)
- II Group, 24th Artillery Regiment "Piemonte" (75/27 mod. 11 field guns)
- XLII Artillery Group (105/28 cannons; formed by the 6th Army Corps Artillery Regiment)

=== Auto-transportable North-African-type 42 ===
On 2 January 1942, after the Italian divisions had suffered heavy losses of personnel and equipment during the British Operation Crusader, General Ettore Bastico, the commander of Axis forces in North Africa, ordered that frontline infantry divisions in North Africa, with the exception of the 101st Motorized Division "Trieste", should be reorganized according to the new Auto-transportable North-African-type 42 table of organization and equipment. To reduce the logistic requirements the divisions were reduced to 7,000 men and all their support and transport units were transferred to the direct control to the Italian North African Armed Forces Command. The divisions' infantry regiments were cut down to two battalions of four fusilier companies each and the regiment's heavy weapons, along with the heavy weapons of the divisions' Support Weapons Battalion, were distributed equally among the companies. Each fusilier company then consisted of a command, a fusilier platoon, a machine gun platoon with three Breda M37 heavy machine guns, an anti-tank platoon with three S-18/1000 anti-tank rifles, and an anti-tank platoon with three 47/32 mod. 35 anti-tank guns. Bastico also ordered that, if men and materiel should become available, each regiment was to form a third battalion. Additionally it was planned to strengthen the divisions' artillery regiments by adding a fourth artillery group equipped with 100/17 mod. 16 howitzers and an anti-aircraft/anti-tank group with either German 8.8 cm Flak cannons or Italian 90/53 cannons. However, due to the difficulty of shipping the required materiel across the Mediterranean most infantry and artillery regiments never received the full complement of men and material. Afterwards the 17th Infantry Division "Pavia" consisted of the following units:

17th Infantry Division "Pavia" organization in 1942

- 17th Infantry Division "Pavia"
  - Headquarters
    - Command Company
    - 679th Carabinieri Section
    - 54th Field Post Office
    - 17th Infantry Division Command Transport Squad
  - 27th Infantry Regiment "Pavia"
    - Command Company
    - 2 × Fusilier battalions
      - Command Company, 4 × Fusilier companies, each consisting of a command, and 1 × Fusilier Platoon, 1 × Machine Gun Platoon (Breda M37 heavy machine guns), 1 × Anti-tank Platoon (S-18/1000 anti-tank rifles), 1 × Anti-tank Platoon (47/32 mod. 35 anti-tank guns)
    - Mortar Company (81mm mod. 35 mortars)
  - 28th Infantry Regiment "Pavia"
    - Command Company
    - 2 × Fusilier battalions
      - Command Company, 4 × Fusilier companies, each consisting of a command, and 1 × Fusilier Platoon, 1 × Machine Gun Platoon (Breda M37 heavy machine guns), 1 × Anti-tank Platoon (S-18/1000 anti-tank rifles), 1 × Anti-tank Platoon (47/32 mod. 35 anti-tank guns)
    - Mortar Company (81mm mod. 35 mortars)
  - 26th Artillery Regiment "Pavia"
    - Command Unit
    - I Group (100/17 mod. 14 howitzers; newly formed group, which joined the regiment in May 1942; disbanded in October 1942)
    - II Group (75/27 mod. 06 field guns; newly formed group, which joined the regiment in April 1942)
    - XLIX Group (105/28 cannons; attached from March to April 1942)
    - CCLXXXIII Group (Guardia alla Frontiera unit, which joined the regiment after Operation Crusader)
      - 2 × batteries with 75/27 mod. 06 field guns and 1 × battery with 77/28 field guns
    - CCLXXXIV Group (75/27 mod. 06 field guns; Guardia alla Frontiera unit, which joined the regiment after Operation Crusader)
    - 77th Anti-aircraft Battery (20/65 mod. 35 anti-aircraft guns; joined the regiment in March 1942)
    - 432nd Anti-aircraft Battery (20/65 mod. 35 anti-aircraft guns; joined the regiment in April 1942)
    - Ammunition and Supply Unit
  - XVII Mixed Engineer Battalion
    - 17th Telegraph and Radio Operators Company
    - 1 × Engineer Company
    - 1 × Searchlight Section
  - 21st Medical Section
    - 66th Field Hospital
    - 84th Field Hospital
    - 1 × Surgical Unit
  - Supply Section

== Commanding officers ==
The division's commanding officers were:

- Generale di Brigata Pietro Zaglio (24 May 1939 - 20 April 1941)
- Generale di Brigata Umberto Marchesi (acting, 21 April 1941 - 17 May 1941)
- Generale di Brigata Antonio Franceschini (18 May 1941 - 23 March 1942)
- Generale di Brigata Dino Parri (acting, 24 March 1942 - 8 April 1942)
- Generale di Brigata Arturo Torriano (9 April 1942 - 20 September 1942)
- Generale di Brigata Nazzareno Scattaglia (21 September 1942 - 7 November 1942, POW)
