= Replje =

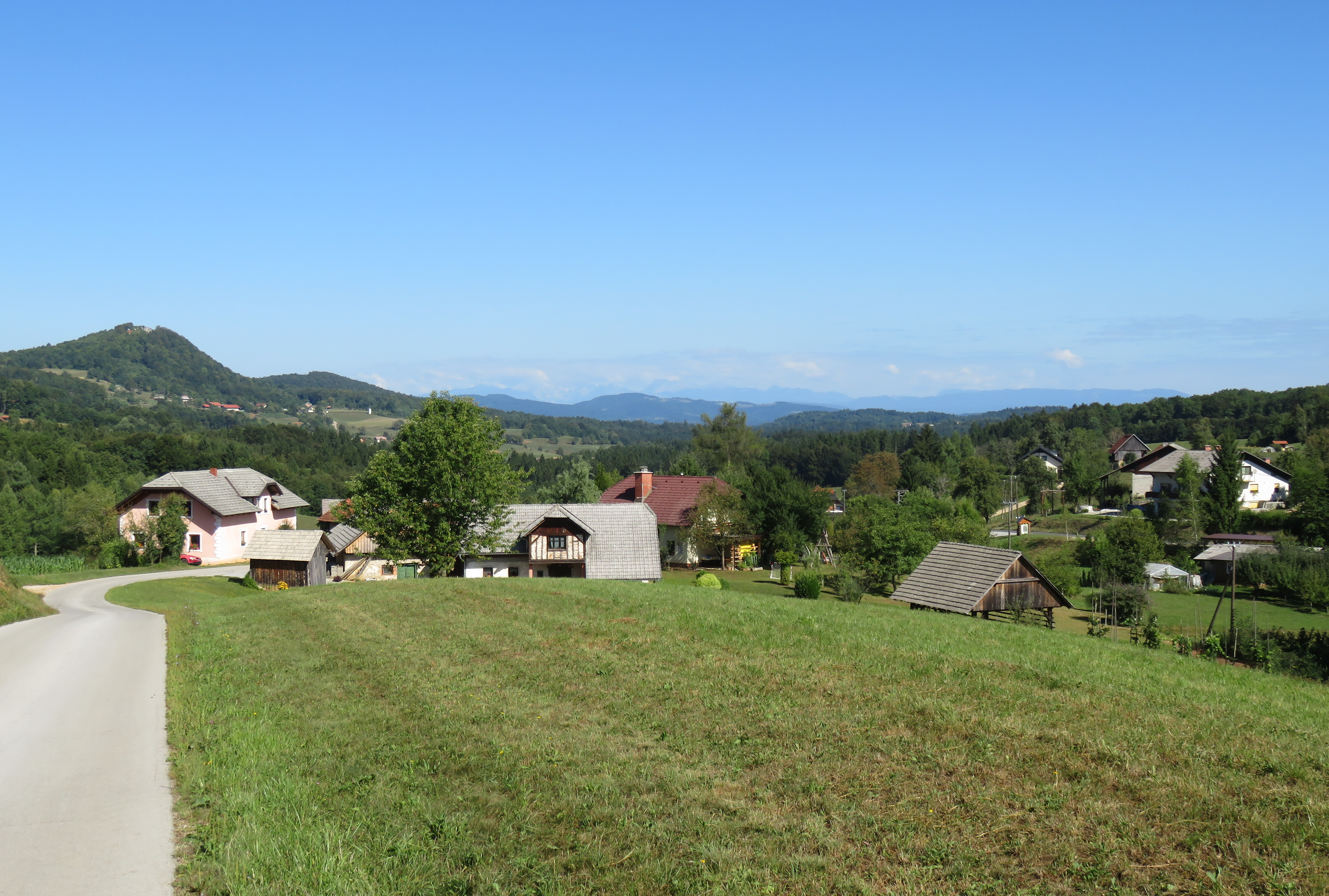

- Location in Slovenia
- Coordinates: 45°52′38.05″N 14°55′0.37″E
- Country: Slovenia
- Traditional region: Lower Carniola
- Statistical region: Southeast Slovenia
- Municipality: Trebnje

Area
  - Total: 1.19 km^{2} (0.46 sq mi)
- Elevation: 347.9 m (1,141 ft)

Population (2002)
  - Total: 25

Replje (pronounced [ˈɾeːpljɛ], in older sources Riplje, German: Riple) is a small village in the Municipality of Trebnje in eastern Slovenia. It lies on the road leading north from Žužemberk towards Zagorica pri Velikem Gabru in the historical region of Lower Carniola. The municipality is now included in the Southeast Slovenia Statistical Region.
