= Rakitnica, Ribnica =

Rakitnica
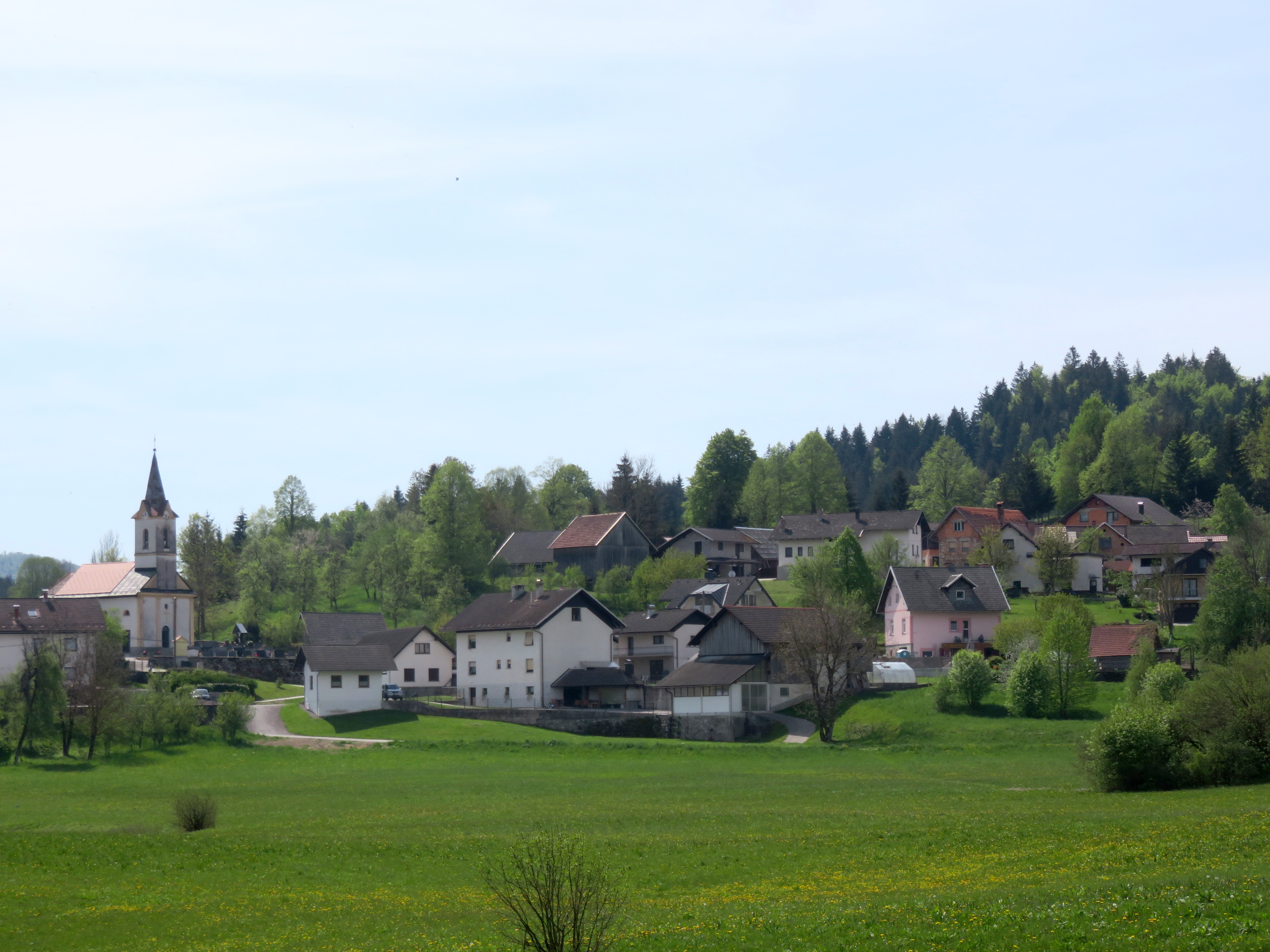

- Location in Slovenia
- Coordinates: 45°41′34.84″N 14°45′28.67″E
- Country: Slovenia
- Traditional region: Lower Carniola
- Statistical region: Southeast Slovenia
- Municipality: Ribnica

Area
  - Total: 3.67 km^{2} (1.42 sq mi)
- Elevation: 489.8 m (1,607 ft)

Population (2002)
  - Total: 285
- Postal code: 1331

Rakitnica (pronounced [ɾaˈkiːtnitsa]; German: Rakitnitz) is a village in the Municipality of Ribnica in southern Slovenia. The area is part of the traditional region of Lower Carniola and is now included in the Southeast Slovenia Statistical Region.

== Church ==
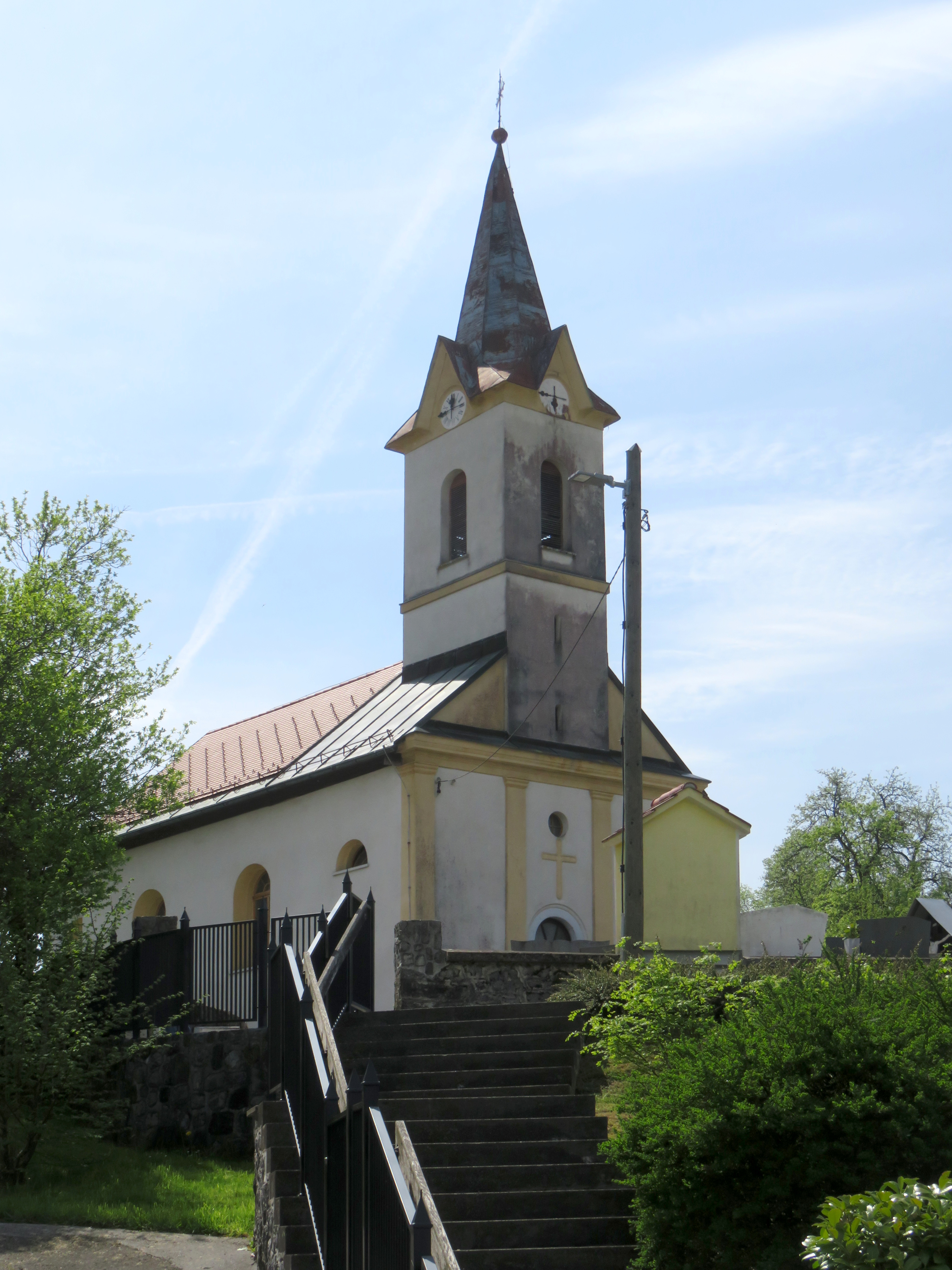
Saint Vitus's Church

The local church, built next to the cemetery in the western part of the settlement, is dedicated to Saint Vitus (Slovene: sveti Vid) and belongs to the Parish of Dolenja Vas. It was built in the mid-18th century on the site of an older church. The main altar dates to 1876.
