= Dolga Vas, Kočevje =

Dolga Vas
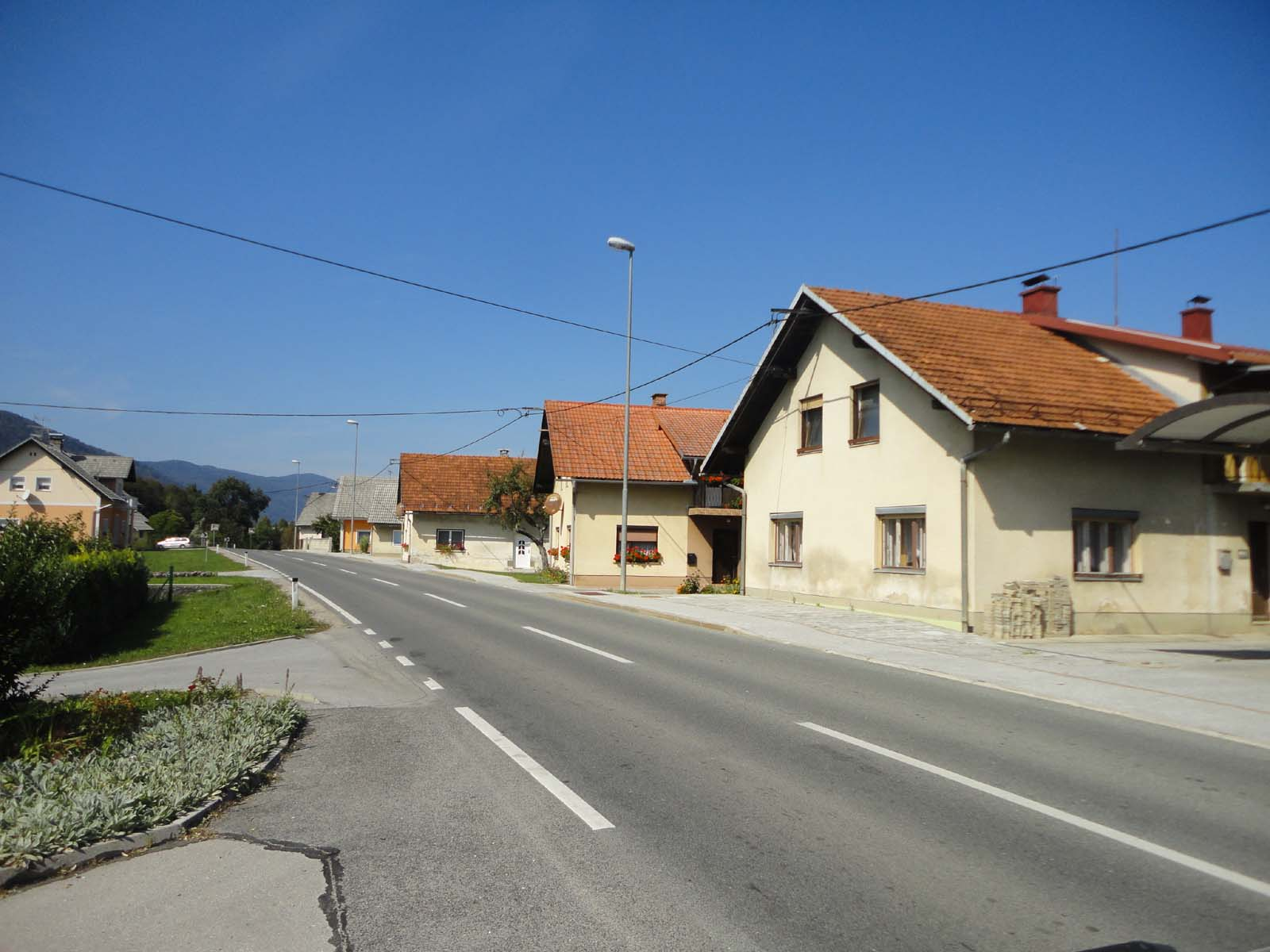

- Location in Slovenia
- Coordinates: 45°37′17.96″N 14°52′39.98″E
- Country: Slovenia
- Traditional region: Lower Carniola
- Statistical region: Southeast Slovenia
- Municipality: Kočevje

Area
  - Total: 6.49 km^{2} (2.51 sq mi)
- Elevation: 460.3 m (1,510 ft)

Population (2002)
  - Total: 740
- Postal code: 1330

Dolga Vas (pronounced [ˈdɔ̀ːwɡa ˈʋáːs]; Slovene: Dolga vas, German: Grafenfeld or Krapfenfeld, Gottscheerish: Kropfnwold or Kropfmvolt) is a settlement on the Rinža River southeast of the town of Kočevje in southern Slovenia. The area is part of the traditional region of Lower Carniola and is now included in the Southeast Slovenia Statistical Region.

== Name ==
The Slovene name Dolga vas literally means 'long village'. The Slovene name refers to the layout of the settlement along the road. The German name Krapfenfeld (recorded in the 1574 land registry and also in later sources as Grafenfeld) is derived from the surname Krapf, literally meaning 'Krapf's field'. The name Grafenfeld is thus a corruption of Krapfenfeld and not vice versa. Popular etymology derived the name from krapfen 'doughnut', resulting in the jocular nickname Kropfmvrassarə 'doughnut eaters' for the residents of the village.

== History ==
In the land registry of 1574, Dolga Vas had eight full farms subdivided into 16 half-farms, corresponding to between 110 and 115 inhabitants. The 1770 census recorded 52 houses in the village. In 1910 the village had 86 houses and a population of 266, of whom 52 households were of German speakers. Before the Second World War, the village had 90 houses and a population of 457. The Gottschee German inhabitants were evicted at the end of 1941, after which new settlers came to the village from various parts of Slovenia. On 11 May 1942, Italian troops killed seven people in the village. The Dolga Vas volunteer fire department became a founding unit of the Kočevje municipal fire department on 28 August 1955.

== Church ==
Dolga Vas had a chapel of ease dedicated to the Holy Name of Jesus. The church stood in the middle of the village and was dedicated on 15 June 1717. It originally had a bell-gable or bell-cot, but after a second bell was purchased in 1792 a bell tower was built in 1804, incorporated into the nave. The church was renovated in 1885, when a tile roof and clock were added to the bell tower. The church originally had a shingled roof, but shortly before the Second World War this was replaced with concrete tiles and a metal roof over the chancel. Although it was in good condition after the war, it was completely destroyed on 18 June 1956. In 2006 the villagers erected a stone wayside shrine at the site of the former church. Holy Name Church was considered a rare architectural treasure from this period in the Kočevje region because of its rich furnishings created by some of the most prominent Baroque craftsmen in Carniola.

== Notable people ==
Notable people that were born or lived in Dolga Vas include:

- Ivan Grajš (1917–1993), beekeeper
- Wilhelm Lampeter (1916–2003), agricultural specialist, university professor
- Franjo Zdravič (1919–1999), plastic surgeon
