= Kočarji =

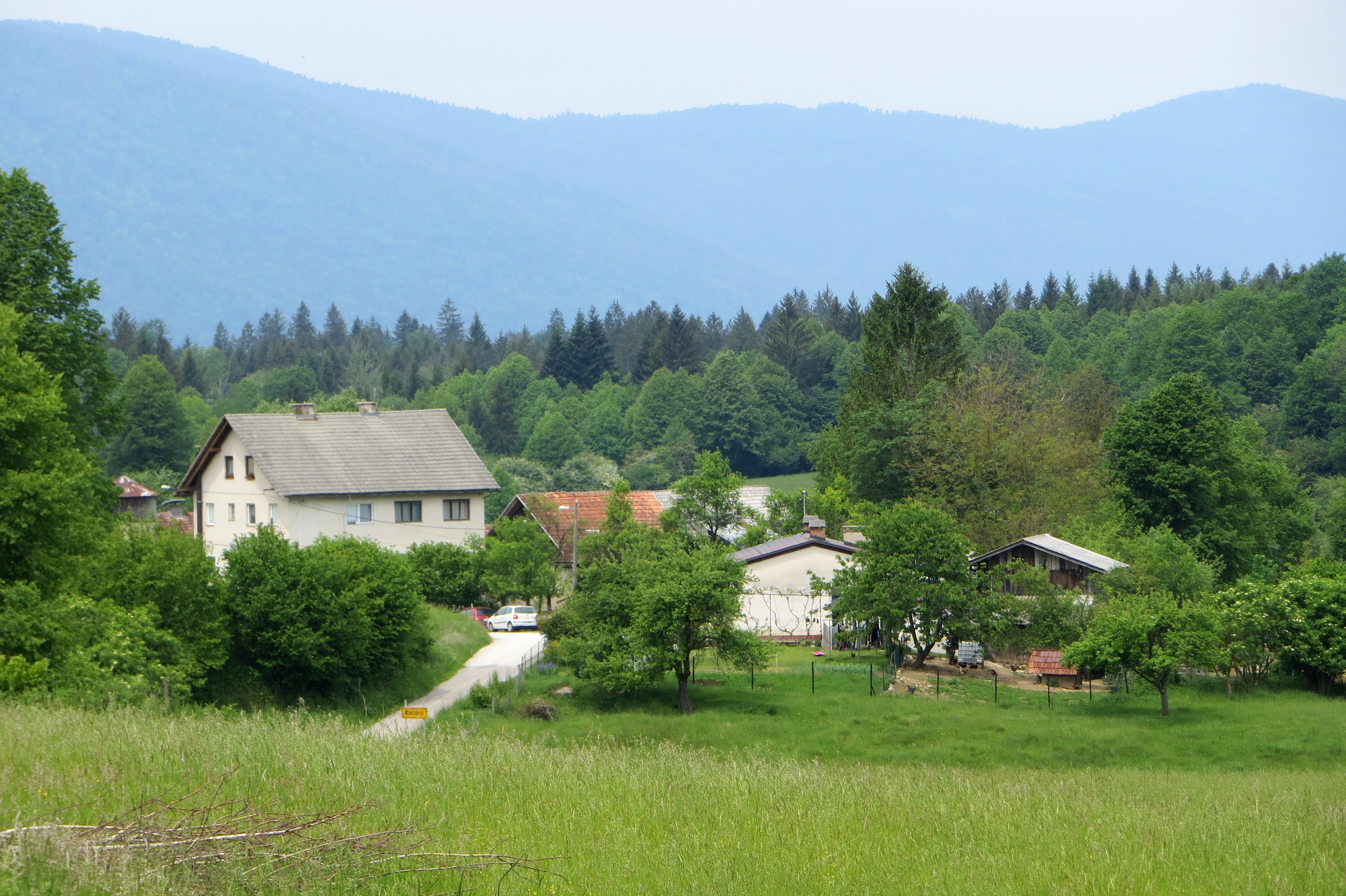

- Location in Slovenia
- Coordinates: 45°35′30.28″N 14°56′59.98″E
- Country: Slovenia
- Traditional region: Lower Carniola
- Statistical region: Southeast Slovenia
- Municipality: Kočevje

Area
  - Total: 4.22 km^{2} (1.63 sq mi)
- Elevation: 496.4 m (1,629 ft)

Population (2002)
  - Total: 29
  - Density: 6.9/km^{2} (18/sq mi)
- Postal code: 1330

Kočarji (pronounced [ˈkoːtʃaɾji]; sometimes Kožarji, German: Niedermösel) is a settlement in the hills southeast of the town of Kočevje in southern Slovenia. The area is part of the traditional region of Lower Carniola and is now included in the Southeast Slovenia Statistical Region.

== Church ==
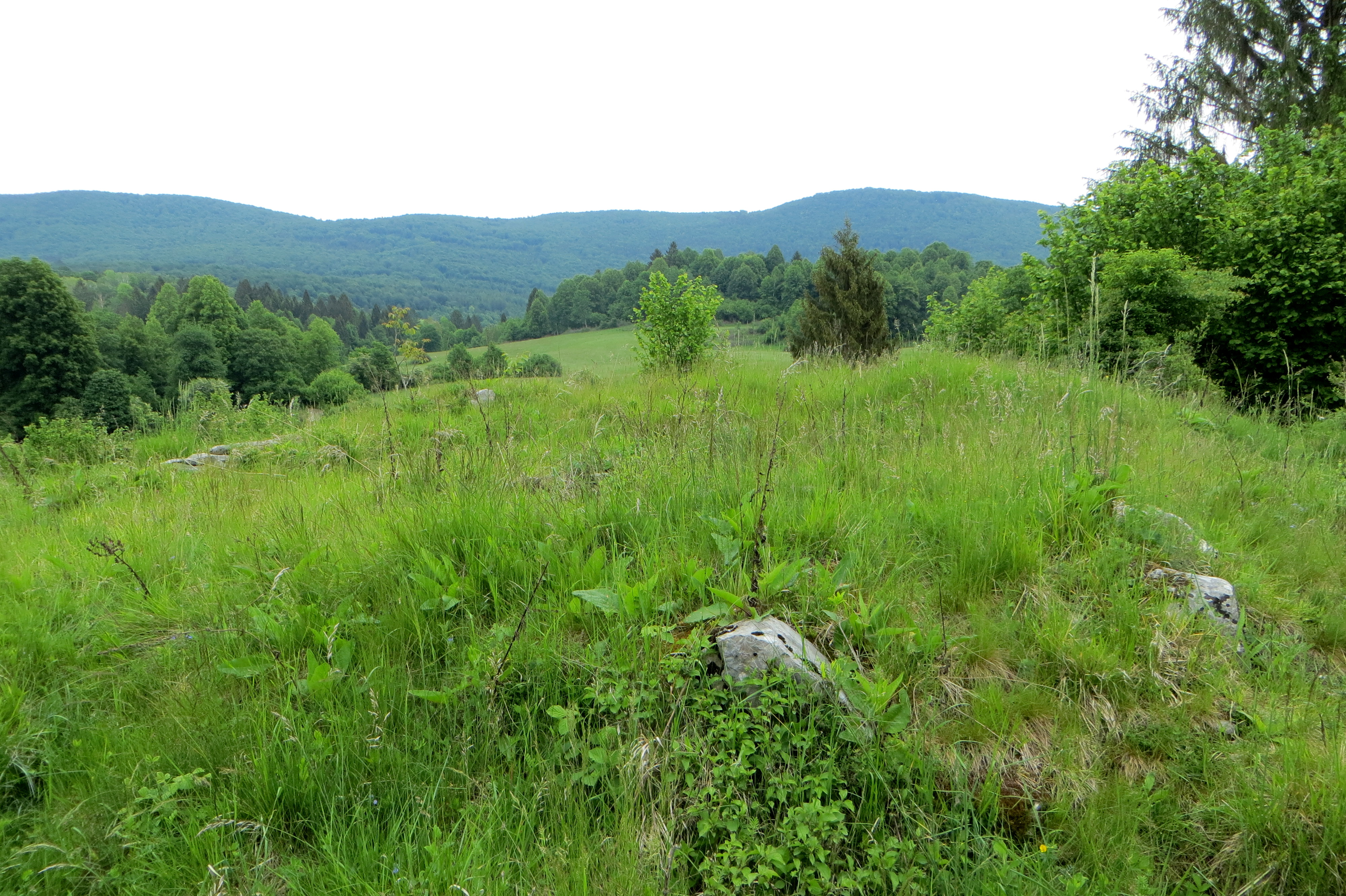
Former site of Saint Ambrose's Church

The local church, dedicated to Saint Ambrose, was first mentioned in documents dating to 1526. Only its foundation is left today.
