= Vrtače =

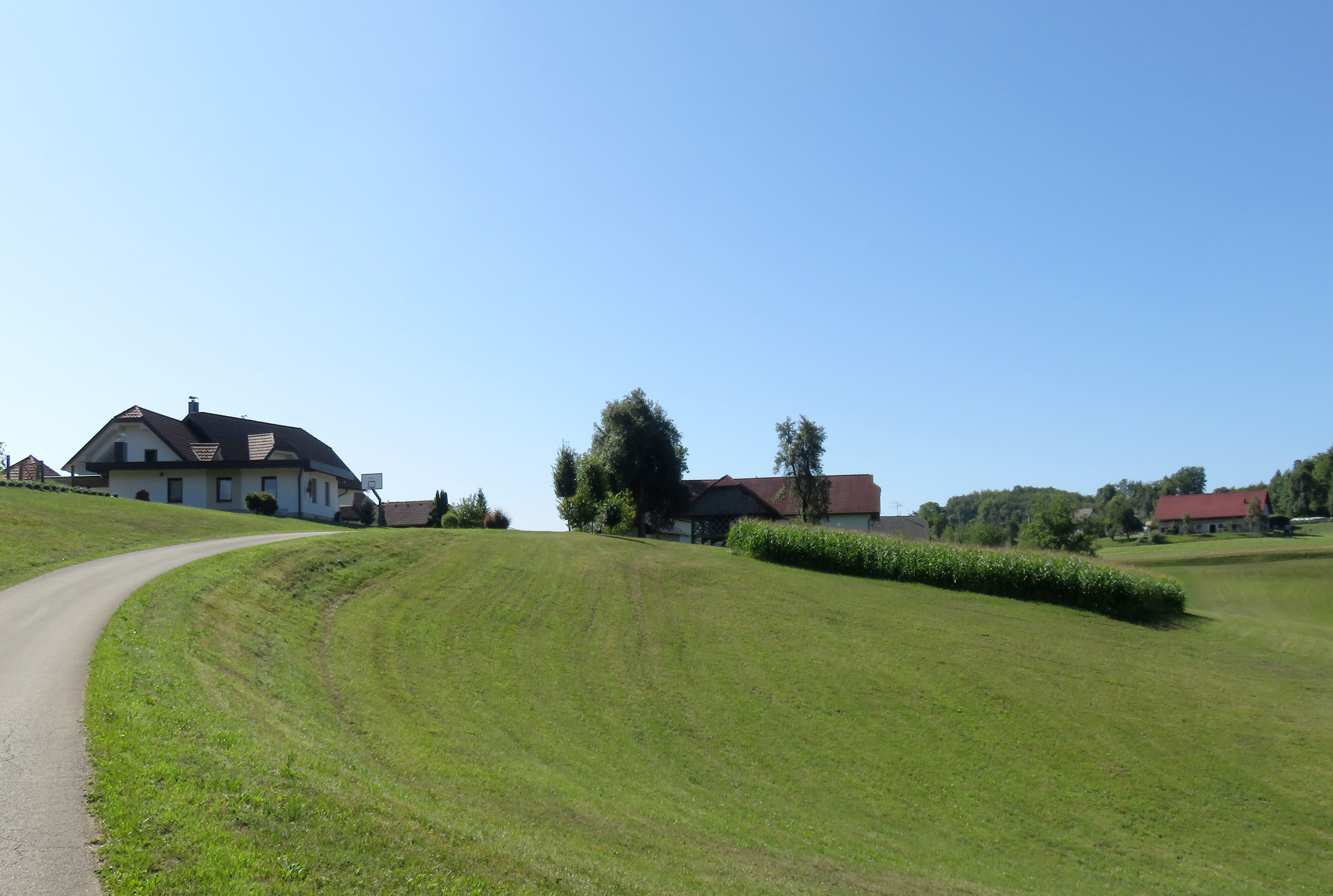

- Location in Slovenia
- Coordinates: 45°52′6.64″N 14°55′15.26″E
- Country: Slovenia
- Traditional region: Lower Carniola
- Statistical region: Southeast Slovenia
- Municipality: Trebnje

Area
  - Total: 0.75 km^{2} (0.29 sq mi)
- Elevation: 394.2 m (1,293 ft)

Population (2002)
  - Total: 21

Vrtače (pronounced [ʋəɾˈtaːtʃɛ]) is a small settlement in the Municipality of Trebnje in eastern Slovenia. The area is part of the traditional region of Lower Carniola and is now included in the Southeast Slovenia Statistical Region.
