= 184th Paratroopers Regiment "Nembo" =

Active Italian Army paratroopers unit

- 184° Reggimento Paracadutisti "Nembo"
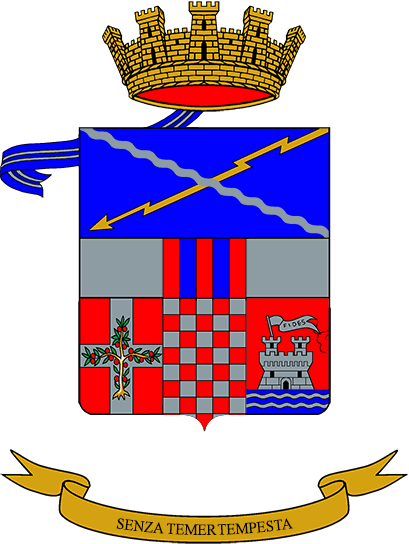
- Active: 24 Aug. 1942 — 30 Sep. 1944; 1 Oct. 2022 — today
- Country: Italy
- Branch: Italian Army
- Part of: Paratroopers Brigade "Folgore"
- Garrison/HQ: Livorno
- Motto: "Senza Temer Tempesta"
- Decorations: 1x War Cross of Military Valor

Insignia
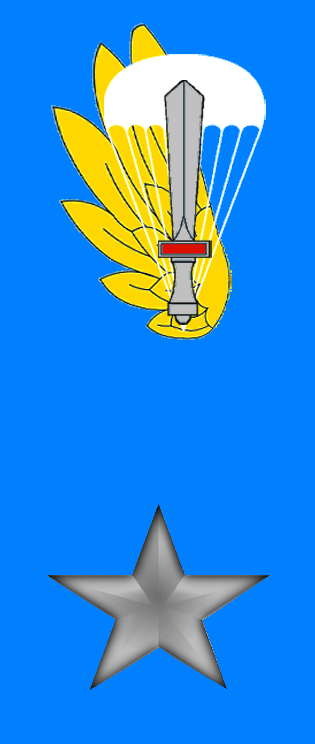
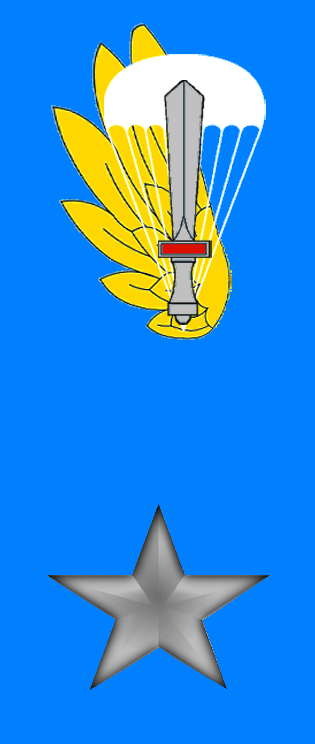
- Regimental gorget patches

The 184th Paratroopers Regiment "Nembo" (Italian: 184° Reggimento Paracadutisti "Nembo") is a unit of the Italian Army based in Livorno in Tuscany. Formed in 1942 and during World War II the regiment is part of the Italian Army's infantry arm's Paracadutisti speciality. On 1 October 2022, the regiment's name, flag, and traditions were assigned to the Command and Tactical Supports Unit "Folgore" of the Paratroopers Brigade "Folgore".

The 184th Infantry Regiment "Nembo" was formed in August 1942 as the Royal Italian Army's fourth paratroopers regiment. The regiment was assigned to the 184th Infantry Division "Nembo", with which the regiment deployed to Sardinia. After the announcement of the Armistice of Cassibile on 8 September 1943 the regiment joined the Italian Co-belligerent Army and fought against the Germans in the Italian campaign. In September 1944 the remnants of the regiment and of its sister regiment, the 183rd Infantry Regiment "Nembo", were merged to form the Paratroopers Regiment "Nembo", which was assigned to the Combat Group "Folgore" and equipped with British materiel. The Combat Group "Folgore" then entered the front on the allied side and fought against the German forces in Italy until the end of the war.

== History ==
On 24 August 1942, the Royal Italian Army formed the 184th Infantry Regiment and XIII Paratroopers Battalion at the Royal Italian Air Force's Paratroopers School in Tarquinia. On the same day, the XII Paratroopers Battalion, which had been formed by the Paratroopers School on 14 July 1942, joined the new regiment. On 15 September 1942, the Paratroopers School formed the XIV Paratroopers Battalion and the 184th Cannons Company, which was equipped with 47/32 mod. 35 anti-tank guns, for the regiment. On 20 October 1942, the regiment, which in the meantime had moved to its permanent based in Pistoia, was mobilized for deployment. On 1 November 1942, the regiment was assigned, together with the 185th Infantry Regiment "Folgore", 184th Artillery Regiment and CLXXXIV Sappers Battalion, to the newly formed 184th Infantry Division "Nembo". On the same date, the 184th Infantry Regiment and 184th Artillery Regiment added "Nembo" to their designations, while the 185th Infantry Regiment "Folgore" was renamed 185th Infantry Regiment "Nembo". On 1 February 1943, the 183rd Infantry Regiment "Nembo" was formed and assigned to the division. On 24 May 1943, the regiments of the division received their flags in a ceremony in Florence. Afterwards the division was ordered to transfer to the island of Sardinia. In Sardinia the 184th Infantry Regiment "Nembo" consisted of the following units:

- 184th Infantry Regiment "Nembo"
  - Command Company
  - XII Paratroopers Battalion
    - 34th, 35th, and 36th Company
  - XIII Paratroopers Battalion
    - 37th, 38th, and 39th Company
  - XIV Paratroopers Battalion
    - 40th, 41st, and 42nd Company
  - 184th Cannons Company (47/32 mod. 35 anti-tank guns)

By early June the regiment had arrived in Sardinia and took up positions at Serramanna, Marrubiu and Villacidro. In the evening of 8 September 1943, the Armistice of Cassibile, which ended hostilities between the Kingdom of Italy and the Anglo-American Allies, was announced by General Dwight D. Eisenhower on Radio Algiers and by Marshal Pietro Badoglio on Italian radio. The Germans reacted by invading Italy and the XII Paratroopers Battalion of the 184th Infantry Regiment "Nembo" sided with the invaders. Together with troops deserting the XIII Paratroopers Battalion, the XII Paratroopers Battalion retreated with the German 90th Panzergrenadier Division towards Corsica. The "Nembo" division's Chief of Staff Lieutenant Colonel Alberto Bechi Luserna pursued the mutinous troops to try to convince them to return to their positions and respect the chain of command. On 9 September 1943, near Borore Bechi Luserna caught up with the retreating troops, who killed him and one of the accompanying Carabinieri officers. The mutineers then dumped his body into the sea, while crossing the Strait of Bonifacio to Corsica. For his courage Alberto Bechi Luserna was awarded Italy's highest military honor the Gold Medal of Military Valor. Following these events, the Armed Forces Command Sardinia ordered the XIII Army Corps to keep the "Nembo" division under strict surveillance and away from combat operations. To facilitate this the remnants of the 184th Infantry Regiment "Nembo" were assembled at Villamar.

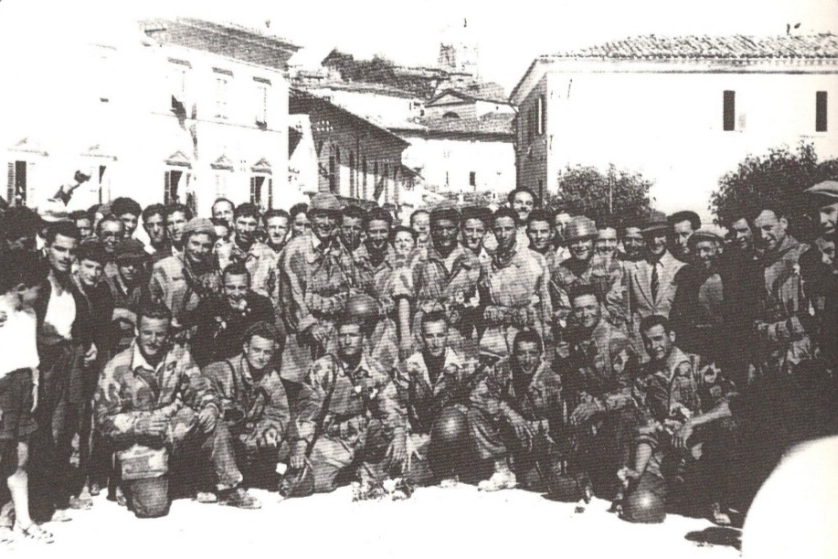
Paratroopers of the 184th Infantry Division "Nembo" after the liberation of Sarnano in June 1944

On 6 May 1944, the regiment embarked in Cagliari and was shipped to Naples, where the Nembo division joined the Italian Co-belligerent Army's Italian Liberation Corps. On 18 May 1944, the 184th Infantry Regiment "Nembo" entered combat against the Germans on the Adriatic side of the Italian Front. On 31 May 1944, by the rest of the Nembo division joined the fight against the Germans. On 8–9 July 1944, the regiment distinguished itself during the Battle of Ancona at Filottrano. For this the 184th Infantry Regiment "Nembo" was awarded the War Cross of Military Valor, which was affixed to the regiment's flag. In late August 1944, after having suffered heavy losses, the Nembo division's remnants were taken out of the front and sent to Campania, where the division's remnants were used to form the Combat Group "Folgore" on 24 September 1944. On 30 September 1944, the battalions of the 184th Infantry Regiment "Nembo" were disbanded and their personnel used to form the II Battalion of the newly formed Paratroopers Regiment "Nembo", while the personnel of the disbanded battalions of the 183rd Infantry Regiment "Nembo" were used to form the new regiment's I Battalion. The new regiment, whose staff consisted of personnel drawn from both regiments, received the flag of the 183rd Infantry Regiment "Nembo", while the flag of the 184th Infantry Regiment "Nembo" was transferred to the Regional Command Campania for safekeeping. The Paratroopers Regiment "Nembo" continued to serve on the allied side for the rest of the war.

=== Reactivation ===
On 1 October 1963, the Italian Army formed the Paratroopers Brigade Headquarters in Pisa, with the personnel of the 1st Organization and Services Company and Paratroopers Signal Platoon of the 1st Paratroopers Tactical Group that had been formed on 1 July 1958. On 20 January 1964, the Paratroopers Brigade Headquarters moved from Pisa to Livorno. On 1 October 1975, as part of the 1975 Italian Army reforms, the headquarters was renamed Paratroopers Command and Signal Unit "Folgore". On 1 January 1994, the Paratroopers Engineer Company "Folgore" in Lucca joint the unit, which was consequently renamed Command and Tactical Supports Unit "Folgore". On 2 February 2002, the Paratroopers Engineer Company "Folgore" was disbanded and its personnel transferred to the 8th Paratroopers Sappers Battalion.

On 1 October 2022, the name, flag and traditions of the 184th Infantry Regiment "Nembo" were assigned to the Command and Tactical Supports Unit "Folgore" of the Paratroopers Brigade "Folgore". On the same day, the unit was renamed 184th Paratroopers Command and Tactical Supports Unit "Nembo".

== Organization ==
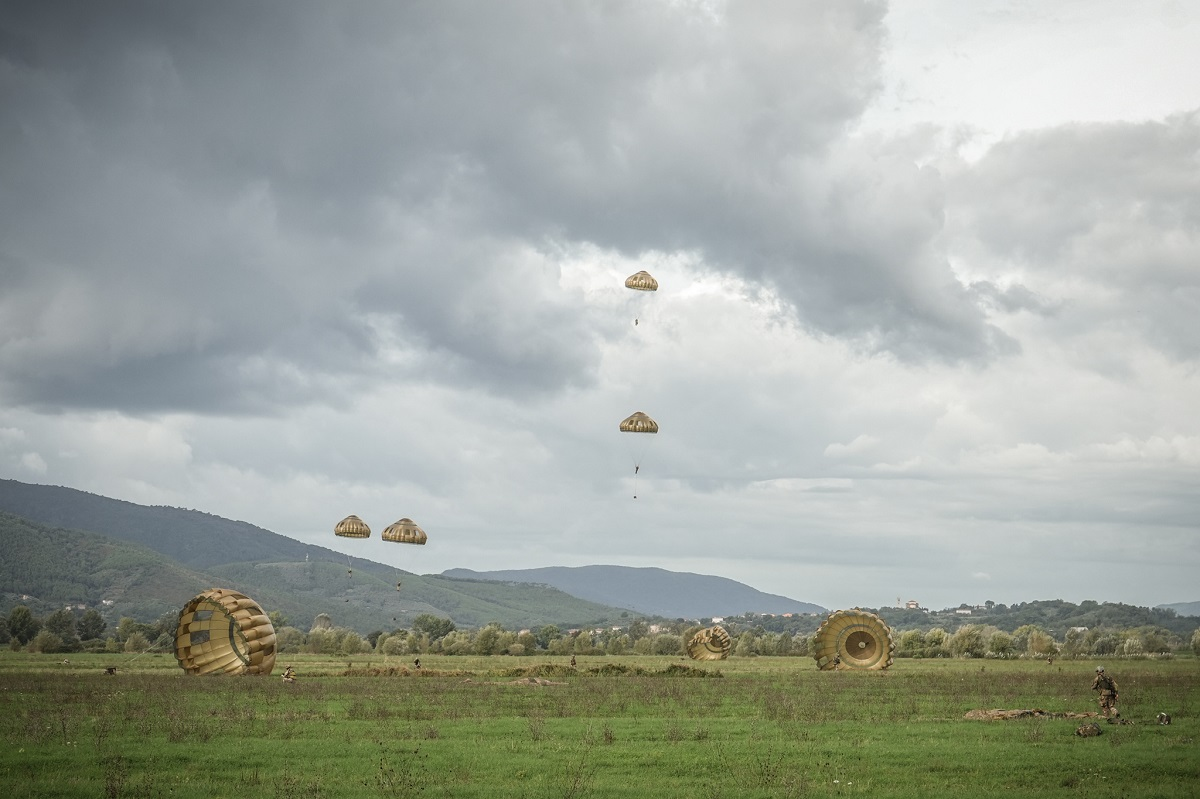
184th Paratroopers Command and Tactical Supports Unit "Nembo" paratroopers landing during an exercise 2024

As of 2026 the 184th Paratroopers Command and Tactical Supports Unit "Nembo" is organized as follows:

- 184th Paratroopers Command and Tactical Supports Unit "Nembo", in Livorno
  - Command and Logistic Support Company
  - Signal Company

== See also ==
- Paratroopers Brigade "Folgore"
