= 184th Artillery Regiment "Nembo" =

Inactive Italian Army artillery unit

- 184° Reggimento Artiglieria "Nembo"
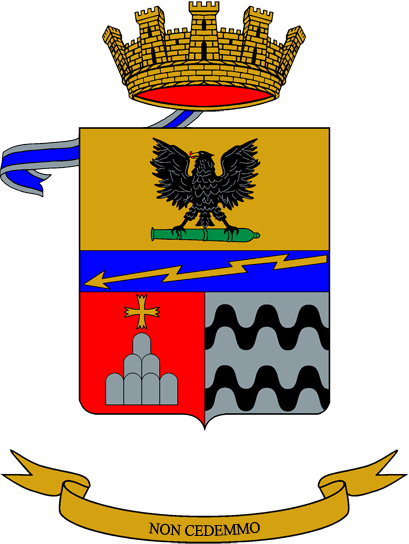
- Regimental coat of arms
- Active: 15 Sept. 1942 — 1 July 1953; 1 Jan. 1976 — 30 Oct. 1996
- Country: Italy
- Branch: Italian Army
- Type: Artillery
- Role: Field artillery
- Part of: Mechanized Division "Folgore"
- Garrison/HQ: Gradisca d'Isonzo
- Motto: "Non cedemmo"
- Anniversaries: 15 June 1918 - Second Battle of the Piave River
- Decorations: 1x Silver Medal of Military Valor

Insignia
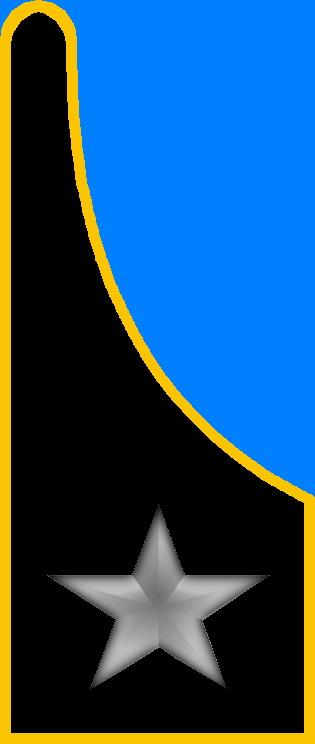
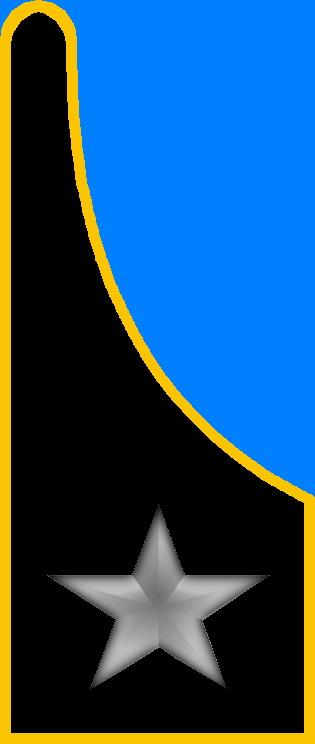
- Regimental gorget patches

The 184th Artillery Regiment "Nembo" (Italian: 184° Reggimento Artiglieria "Nembo") is an inactive field artillery regiment of the Italian Army, which was based in Gradisca d'Isonzo in Friuli-Venezia Giulia. Originally an artillery regiment of the Royal Italian Army, the regiment was assigned in World War II to the 184th Infantry Division "Nembo", which was Italy's second paratroopers divisions. After the announcement of the Armistice of Cassibile the division and regiment joined the Italian Liberation Corps and fought on the allied side in the Italian campaign. In 1944 the regiment joined the Combat Group "Folgore" of the Italian Co-belligerent Army and was assigned to the British XIII Corps. During the Cold War the regiment was assigned to the Infantry Division "Folgore" and from 1976 the Mechanized Division "Folgore". The regiment was disbanded in 1996. The regimental anniversary falls, as for all Italian Army artillery regiments, on June 15, the beginning of the Second Battle of the Piave River in 1918.

== History ==
=== World War II ===
On 15 September 1942, the 184th Artillery Regiment was formed in Pisa. The regiment consisted of a command, a command unit, and two groups with 47/32 mod. 35 anti-tank guns. On 1 November 1942, the regiment was assigned, together with the 185th Infantry Regiment "Folgore", 184th Infantry Regiment and CLXXXIV Sappers Battalion, to the newly formed 184th Infantry Division "Nembo". On the same date, the 184th Infantry Regiment and 184th Artillery Regiment added "Nembo" to their designations, while the 185th Infantry Regiment "Folgore" was renamed 185th Infantry Regiment "Nembo". As the Nembo division was the Royal Italian Army's second paratroopers division, the personnel of the 184th Artillery Regiment "Nembo" had been trained by the Italian Royal Air Force's Paratroopers School in Tarquinia. On 1 February 1943, the 183rd Infantry Regiment "Nembo" was formed and assigned to the division. Consequently the 184th Artillery Regiment "Nembo" formed a third group to support the new regiment.

On 24 May 1943, the regiments of the division received their flags in a ceremony in Florence. In early June 1943 the division was transferred to Sardinia, while the 185th Infantry Regiment "Nembo" and the III Paratroopers Artillery Group were detached. In Sardinia the division was assigned to XIII Army Corps, which was responsible for the defense of the southern half of the island. The division was intended to act as rapid reinforcement for the coastal units garrisoning the beaches, where allied forces were expected to land.

The announcement of the Armistice of Cassibile on 8 September 1943 saw the division, with the exception of one battalion, which sided with the German, remain inactive. In January 1944 the 184th Artillery Regiment "Nembo" returned to Italy, where its two groups were equipped with more powerful 75/27 field guns, respectively 100/22 mod. 14/19 howitzers. One month later the regiment also added an anti-aircraft battery with 20/65 mod. 35 anti-aircraft guns.

In May the rest of the division was transferred to mainland Italy and joined the Italian Co-belligerent Army's Italian Liberation Corps and entered combat.

In July 1944 the Nembo fought in the Battle of Ancona and distinguished itself in the liberation of Filottrano. In August 1944 the regiment received a third group equipped with British QF 6-pounder anti-tank guns. On 24 September 1944 the Nembo division was disbanded and its personnel used to form the Paratroopers Regiment "Nembo" and various support units for the Combat Group "Folgore". The 184th Artillery Regiment "Nembo" was assigned to the Combat Group "Folgore", renamed Artillery Regiment "Folgore", and re-equipped with British guns. The regiment now consisted of the following units:

- Artillery Regiment "Folgore"
  - Command Unit
  - I Group with QF 25-pounder field guns
  - II Group with QF 25-pounder field guns
  - III Group with QF 25-pounder field guns
  - IV Group with QF 25-pounder field guns
  - V Group with QF 17-pounder anti-tank guns
  - VI Group with 40/56 anti-aircraft autocannons
  - 2 × mobile workshops

On 19 April 1945 the II Battalion of the Paratroopers Regiment "Nembo" fought a heavy battle against the Fallschirmjäger of the German 1. Fallschirmjäger-Division at Case Grizzano, which opened the way for the allied armies to liberate Bologna.

For its conduct at during the Italian campaign the regiment was awarded a Silver Medal of Military Valor, which was affixed to the regiment's flag and is depicted on the regiment's coat of arms.

=== Cold War ===
After the war the regiment was based in Montecatini Terme. On 15 October 1945 the Combat Group "Folgore" was reorganized as Infantry Division "Folgore". In 1946 the regiment moved from Montecatini to Lucca. On 15 January 1947 the regiment was renamed 184th Artillery Regiment "Folgore" and on 1 February of the same year it ceded two of its groups equipped with QF 25-pounder field guns, as well as its VI Group to help reform the 33rd Field Artillery Regiment. In April of the same year the regiment ceded its V Group to help form the 41st Anti-tank Field Artillery Regiment.

At the beginning of 1948 the regiment was renamed 184th Field Artillery Regiment and moved from Lucca to Pordenone. The regiment consisted now of a command, a command unit, the I, II, and III groups with QF 25-pounder field guns, and the Mountain Artillery Group "Belluno", which had been formed on 22 August 1947. On 1 March 1948 the Mountain Artillery Group "Belluno" was transferred to the Artillery Command of the V Territorial Military Command. In 1949 the regiment moved from Pordenone to Treviso.

On 1 January 1951 the Infantry Division "Folgore" included the following artillery regiments:

- Infantry Division "Folgore", in Treviso
  - 33rd Field Artillery Regiment, in Padua
  - 41st Anti-tank Field Artillery Regiment, in Bassano del Grappa
  - 184th Field Artillery Regiment, in Treviso
  - 5th Light Anti-aircraft Artillery Regiment, in Mestre

On 1 February 1951 the regiment received an anti-aircraft group with 40/56 autocannons from the 5th Light Anti-aircraft Artillery Regiment. On 30 June 1951 the Italian Army's artillery was reorganized and the next day the regiment consisted of the following units:

- 184th Field Artillery Regiment
  - Command Unit
  - I Group with M101 105 mm towed howitzers
  - II Group with M101 105mm towed howitzers
  - III Anti-aircraft Group with 40/56 anti-aircraft autocannons (from the 5th Light Anti-aircraft Artillery Regiment)
  - Anti-tank Sub-grouping
    - IV Anti-tank Group with QF 17-pounder anti-tank guns (from the 18th Anti-tank Field Artillery Regiment)
    - V Anti-tank Group with QF 17-pounder anti-tank guns (from the 41st Anti-tank Field Artillery Regiment)

In 1952 the two anti-tank groups were equipped with M18 Hellcat tank destroyers. On 1 July 1953 the 184th Field Artillery Regiment was disbanded and its personnel and equipment used to reform the 5th Mountain Artillery Regiment of the Alpine Brigade "Orobica", while the IV Group and V Group were transferred to the 33rd Field Artillery Regiment.

During the 1975 army reform the army disbanded the regimental level and newly independent battalions and groups were granted for the first time their own flags. On 31 December 1975 the 33rd Field Artillery Regiment of the Infantry Division "Folgore" was disbanded and the next day the regiment's IV Heavy Field Artillery Group in Treviso was reorganized and renamed 184th Heavy Self-propelled Field Artillery Group "Filottrano". To avoid confusion with the 183rd Mechanized Infantry Battalion "Nembo", the group was named for Filottrano, where the 184th Artillery Regiment "Nembo" had distinguished itself in July 1944. The group was assigned to the Artillery Command of the Mechanized Division "Folgore" and consisted of a command, a command and services battery, and three batteries with towed M114 155 mm howitzers.

On 1 April 1976 the group moved from Treviso to Padua. On 12 November 1976 the group was assigned the flag and traditions of the 184th Artillery Regiment "Nembo" by decree 846 of the President of the Italian Republic Giovanni Leone. Although the group was designated as a self-propelled unit, the planned transition from towed M114 155mm howitzers to M109G 155 mm self-propelled howitzers did not occur. At the time the group with its towed howitzers fielded 433 men (31 officers, 53 non-commissioned officers, and 349 soldiers).

On 27 September 1980 the group was equipped with modern towed FH70 155 mm howitzers. On 1 July 1986 the group was assigned to the Artillery Command of the 4th Alpine Army Corps and the next year the group moved from Padua to Trento, where it took over the base of the 4th Group of the disbanded 4th Heavy Field Artillery Regiment.

=== Recent times ===
On 2 April 1991 the batteries of the Mountain Artillery Group "Vicenza" in Elvas were disbanded and the flag of the 2nd Mountain Artillery Regiment was transferred to Trento, where it supplanted the flag of the 184th Heavy Self-propelled Field Artillery Group "Filottrano", which one week later, on 9 April 1991, supplanted the flag of the 46th Self-propelled Field Artillery Group "Trento" in Gradisca d'Isonzo. Afterwards the flag of the 46th Artillery Regiment "Trento" was transferred to the Shrine of the Flags in the Vittoriano in Rome. The 184th Self-propelled Field Artillery Group "Filottrano" was assigned, together with the 183rd Mechanized Infantry Battalion "Nembo" in Gradisca d'Isonzo, to the Mechanized Brigade "Gorizia". Now finally the group was equipped with self-propelled howitzer, specifically M109L 155 mm self-propelled howitzers.

On 25 August 1993 the 184th Self-propelled Field Artillery Group "Filottrano" lost its autonomy and the next day the group entered the 184th Self-propelled Field Artillery Regiment "Nembo". On 24 October 1996 the flag of the 184th Artillery Regiment "Nembo" was returned to the Shrine of the Flags in the Vittoriano in Rome and on 30 October the 184th Self-propelled Field Artillery Regiment "Nembo" and the Mechanized Brigade "Gorizia" were disbanded.
