= Italian Liberation Corps =

- Active: 18 April 1944 – 24 September 1944
- Country: Kingdom of Italy
- Branch: Italian Co-belligerent Army
- Size: Corps
- Engagements: World War II: Italian campaign

Commanders
- Current commander: General Umberto Utili

Insignia
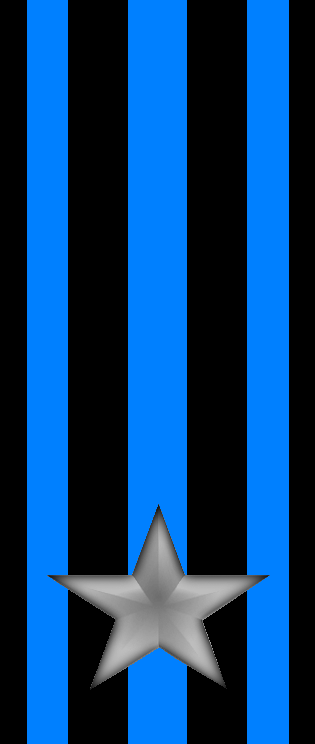
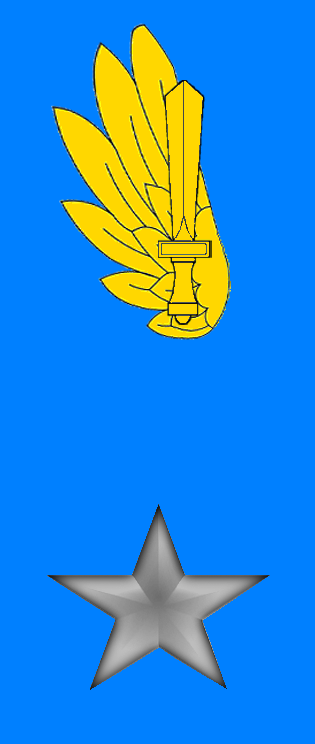
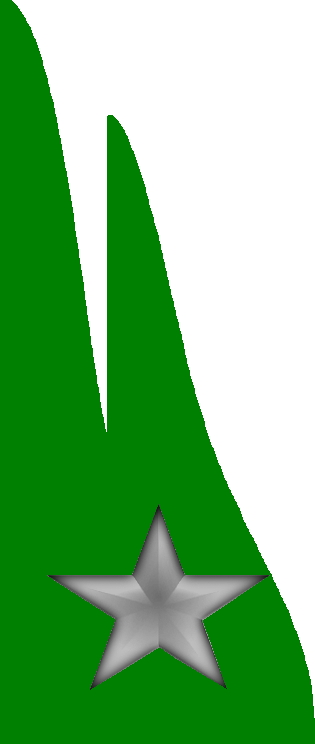
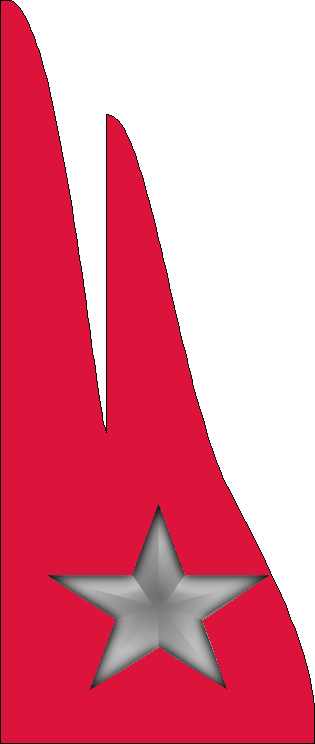
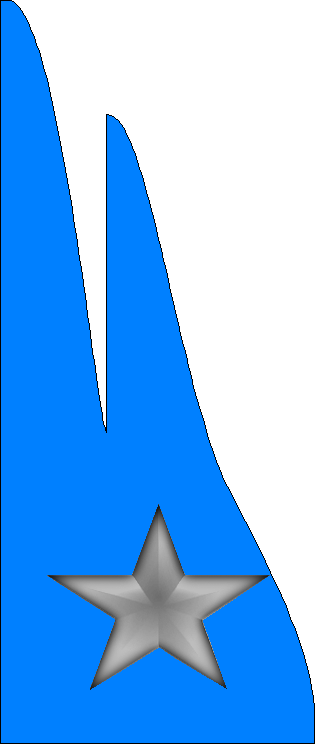
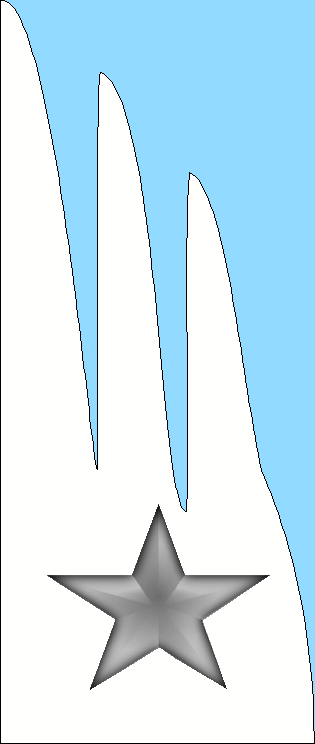
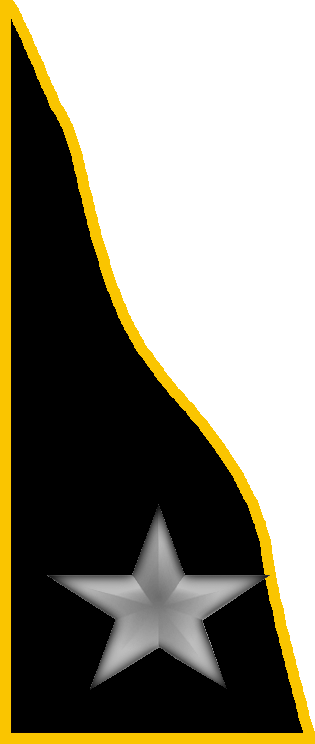
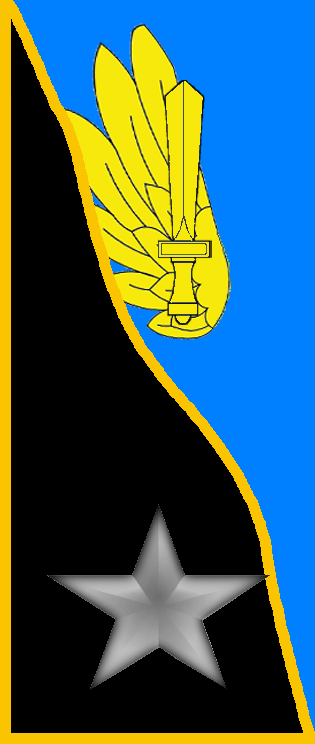
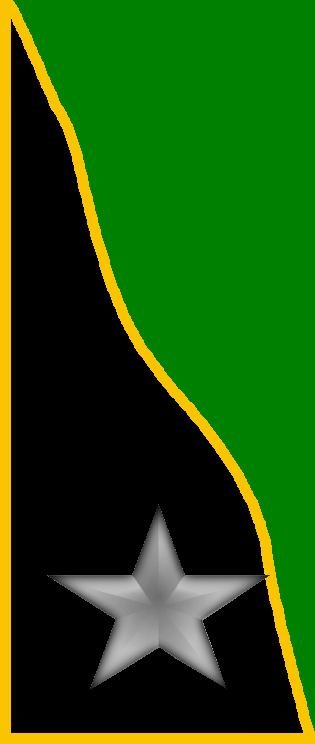
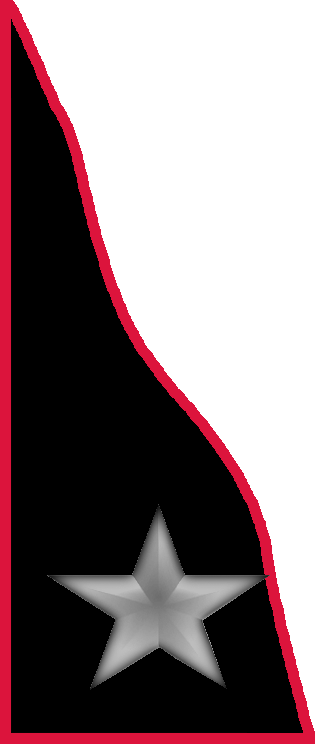
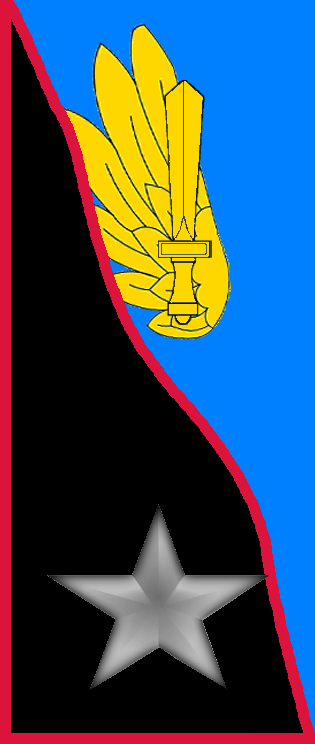
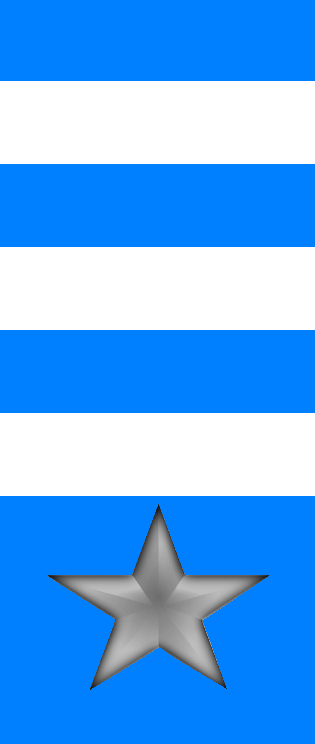
- Identification symbol: Liberation Corps gorget patches

The Italian Liberation Corps (Italian: Corpo Italiano di Liberazione (CIL)) was a corps of the Italian Co-belligerent Army during the Italian campaign of World War II. After the announcement of the Armistice of Cassibile on 8 September 1943 the Italian government began the formation of units to fight on the allied side against Germany. On 18 April 1944 the Italian Liberation Corps was formed, which after an intense cycle of combat operations was disbanded on 24 September 1944 to form division-sized combat groups.

== History ==
=== Constitution ===
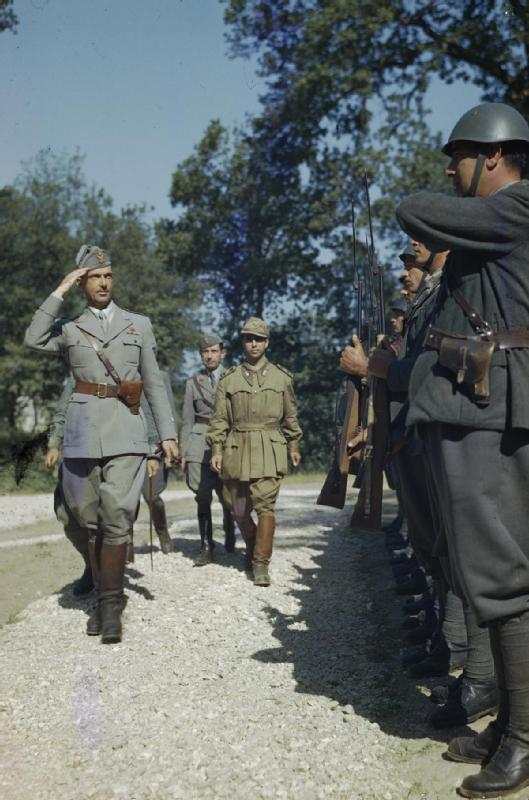
Prince Umberto inspecting a Guard of Honour during his visit to the Italian Liberation Corps in Sparanise, May 1944

On 13 October 1943 Italy declared war on Germany and the Italian government began with the formation of military units to fight on the allied side. The first large unit to be raised was the brigade-sized I Motorized Grouping activated on 27 November 1943 in San Pietro Vernotico near Brindisi with units and personnel of the 58th Infantry Division "Legnano" and 18th Infantry Division "Messina".

On 18 April 1944 the I Motorized Grouping was expanded to division-size and renamed Italian Liberation Corps. With the arrival of the 184th Infantry Division "Nembo" from Sardinia on 26 May 1944 did the Italian Liberation Corps reach corps-size. On 27 May 1944 the corps was assigned to the Polish II Corps and in July 1944 it participated in the Battle of Ancona.

On 24 September 1944 the corps was disbanded its units and personnel used to form the combat groups "Folgore" and "Legnano".

== Organization ==
The Italian Liberation Corps organization from 26 May until 24 September 1944 was:

=== Italian Liberation Corps ===
- Italian Liberation Corps, Generale di Divisione Umberto Utili
  - 11th Motorized Artillery Regiment (from the 104th Infantry Division "Mantova")
    - Command Unit
    - III Group with 75/18 mod. 35 howitzers
    - IV Group with 75/18 mod. 35 howitzers
    - XII Group with 105/28 cannons
    - CCCXIV Group with 100/22 mod. 14/19 howitzers
    - 363rd Anti-aircraft Battery with anti-aircraft guns
  - CLXVI Army Corps Artillery Group (149/19 mod. 37 howitzers)
  - LI Mixed Engineer Battalion (formed 13 November 1943)
    - 51st Engineers Company
    - 51st Telegraph and Radio Operators Company
  - Corps Services

==== 184th Paratroopers Division "Nembo" ====
- 184th Infantry Division "Nembo", Generale di Brigata Giorgio Morigi
  - Command Company
  - 183rd Infantry Regiment "Nembo"
    - Command Company
    - XV Paratroopers Battalion
    - XVI Paratroopers Battalion
    - Paratroopers Support Weapons Company (47/32 anti-tank guns)
  - 184th Infantry Regiment "Nembo"
    - Command Company
    - XIII Paratroopers Battalion
    - XIV Paratroopers Battalion
    - Paratroopers Support Weapons Company (47/32 anti-tank guns)
  - 184th Artillery Regiment "Nembo"
    - Command Battery
    - I Paratroopers Artillery Group (75/27 field guns)
    - II Paratroopers Artillery Group (100/22 howitzers)
    - III Paratroopers Anti-tank Group (QF 6-pounder anti-tank guns)
    - 184th Paratroopers Anti-aircraft Battery (20/65 mod. 35 anti-aircraft guns)
  - CLXXXIV Paratrooper Sappers Battalion
  - 184th Paratrooper Motorcyclists Company
  - 184th Mortar Company (81mm mod. 35 mortars)
  - 184th Paratrooper Telegraph and Radio Operators Company
  - 184th Paratrooper Engineers Company
  - 184th Transport Unit
  - 184th Medical Section
  - 184th Supply Section
  - 324th Carabinieri Section
  - 146th Field Post Office

==== I Brigade ====
- I Brigade, Colonel Ettore Fucci
  - 3rd Alpini Regiment (formed on 25 June 1944)
    - Alpini Battalion "Piemonte"
    - Alpini Battalion "Monte Granero" (joined 25 June 1944)
  - 4th Bersaglieri Regiment (formed 1 February 1944)
    - XXIX Bersaglieri Battalion
    - XXXIII Bersaglieri Battalion (from the 11th Bersaglieri Regiment)
    - 1st Bersaglieri Motorcyclists Company
  - CLXXXV Paratroopers Battalion "Nembo" (joined the I Motorized Grouping in January 1944)
  - IV Alpine Artillery Group (75/13 mod. 15 howitzers)
  - Brigade Services

==== II Brigade ====
- II Brigade, Colonel Teodoro Moggio
  - 68th Infantry Regiment "Legnano"
    - I Fusiliers Battalion
    - II Fusiliers Battalion
    - V Anti-tank Group (47/32 anti-tank guns)
  - Navy Regiment "San Marco" (Royal Italian Navy, joined in early June 1944)
    - Battalion "Bafile" (joined April 1944)
    - Battalion "Grado" (joined early June 1944)
  - IX Assault Unit (joined the I Motorized Grouping on 20 March 1944)
    - Squadron "Cavalleggeri Guide" (joined the IX Assault Unit on 27 June 1944)
  - V Alpine Artillery Group (75/13 mod. 15 howitzers)
  - Brigade Services

== Commanding officers ==
The division's commanding officer was:

- Generale di Brigata Umberto Utili (18 April 1944 - 24 September 1944)

== See also ==
- Italian Co-belligerent Army
