= 184th Infantry Division "Nembo" =

WW2 Italian airborne military unit

- Active: 1942-1944
- Country: Kingdom of Italy
- Branch: Royal Italian Army
- Type: Infantry
- Role: Airborne
- Size: Division
- Engagements: World War II: Italian campaign

Insignia
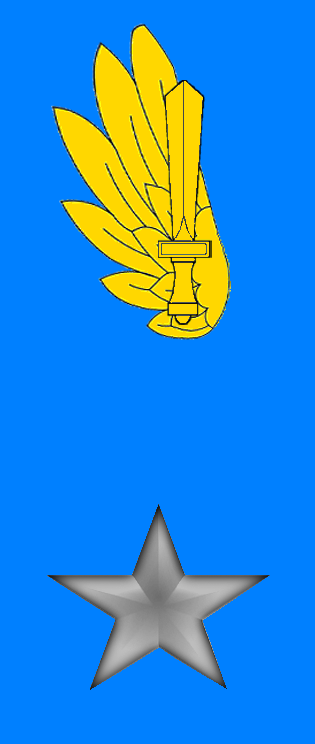
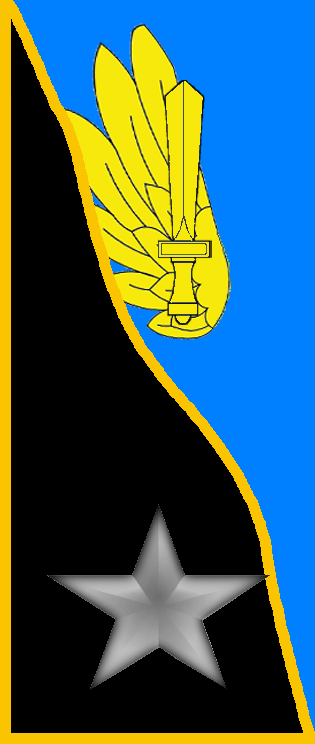
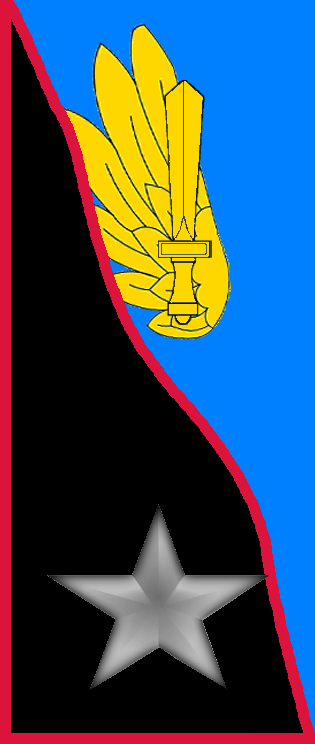
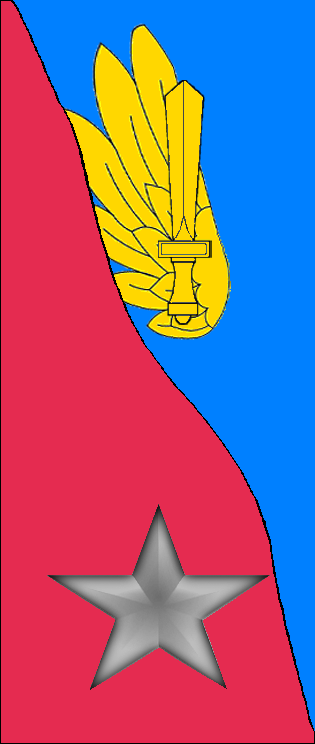
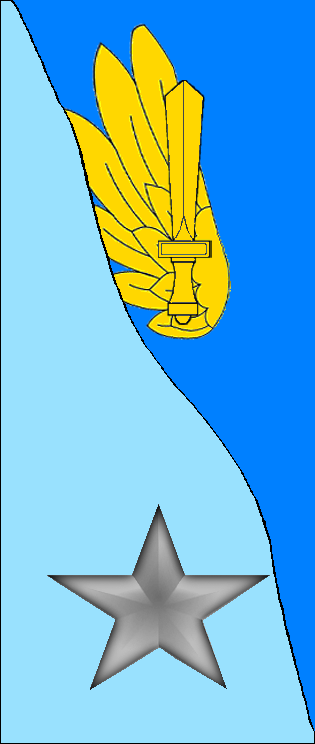
- Identification symbol: Nembo Division gorget patches

The 184th Infantry Division "Nembo" (Italian: 184ª Divisione fanteria "Nembo") was an airborne division of the Royal Italian Army during World War II. After the Armistice of Cassibile, the division joined the Italian Co-belligerent Army's Italian Liberation Corps and, together with the Polish II Corps, liberated Ancona in the Battle of Ancona.

== History ==
=== Formation ===
The division was activated on 1 November 1942 in Pisa. The division consisted initially of the 184th Infantry Regiment "Nembo", 185th Infantry Regiment "Nembo", 184th Artillery Regiment "Nembo", CLXXXIV Paratroopers Sappers Battalion, and minor units.

The 185th Infantry Regiment "Nembo" was formed on 1 April 1941 in Tarquinia as the 1st Paratroopers Regiment, making it the oldest airborne regiment of the Italian Army. The 1st Paratroopers Regiment joined the Paratroopers Division on 1 September 1941, which was renamed 185th Infantry Division "Folgore" on 27 July 1942. On the same date, the 1st Paratroopers Regiment was renamed 185th Infantry Regiment "Folgore". The Folgore division, with the 186th Infantry Regiment "Folgore", 187th Infantry Regiment "Folgore", 185th Artillery Regiment "Folgore", and VIII Paratroopers Sappers Battalion, was sent to Libya in August 1942 to fight in the Western Desert Campaign. The 185th Infantry Regiment "Folgore" remained in Italy to serve as the basis for the formation of the 184th Infantry Division "Nembo". The regiment left the 185th Infantry Division "Folgore" on 15 September and, at the time, consisted of the III, X, and XI paratrooper battalions.

The 184th Infantry Regiment "Nembo" was raised on 24 August 1942 in Florence and consisted of the XII, XIII, and XIV paratrooper battalions, which had been trained at the Royal Air Force Paratroopers School in Tarquinia. The 184th Artillery Regiment "Nembo" was raised on 15 September 1942 in Pisa and consisted of the I and II paratrooper artillery groups, which both had been trained in Tarquinia. The CLXXXIV Paratroopers Sappers Battalion was activated together with the division on 1 November 1942.

Meanwhile, the 185th Infantry Division "Folgore" fought in the Second Battle of El Alamein, during which the division was annihilated by the British XIII Corps. The Folgore division was declared lost due to wartime events on 25 November 1942, leaving the Nembo as the only Italian airborne division. The army's General Staff ordered to transform the Nembo to a triangular division on 11 January 1943, and on 1 February 1943 the 183rd Infantry Regiment "Nembo", with the XV, XVI, and VIII/bis paratrooper battalions, was raised by the Royal Air Force Paratroopers School in Viterbo. The VIII/bis Paratroopers Battalion was formed to replace the original VIII Paratroopers Battalion, which had been reorganized as VIII Paratroopers Sappers Battalion in May 1942 and was destroyed in the Second Battle of El Alamein. The 183rd Infantry Regiment joined the division on 12 April 1943 and was based in Livorno. To complete the division, the 184th Artillery Regiment raised a third paratroopers artillery group and the CLXXXIV Paratroopers Sappers Battalion raised a third paratroopers sappers company.

183rd Infantry Regiment, 184th Infantry Regiment, and 184th Artillery Regiment received their flags in a ceremony in Florence on 30 May 1943, and the division's troops swore their oath to the King of Italy Victor Emmanuel III. In May 1943 the 183rd Infantry Regiment "Nembo" transferred the VIII/bis Paratroopers Battalion to the 185th Infantry Regiment "Nembo" and received the X/bis Paratroopers Battalion in return. The 185th Infantry Regiment "Nembo" then left the division and became an autonomous unit.

=== Sardinia ===
The division's locations in Sardinia 1943

The bulk of the division was transferred to Sardinia in early June 1943, while the 185th Infantry Regiment "Nembo" and the III Paratroopers Artillery Group were detached. In Sardinia, the division was assigned to XIII Army Corps, which was responsible for the defence of the southern half of the island. The division was divided into tactical groups, which were dispersed in the island's southwestern region of Campidano, while one battalion was sent to the northwestern region of Nurra. The tactical groups of the Nembo, together with units of the German 90th Panzergrenadier Division, were intended to act as rapid reinforcements for the coastal units garrisoning the beaches where allied forces were expected to land.

The tactical groupings and groups were named after their commanders and based at the following locations:

- 184th Infantry Division "Nembo", in Villanovaforru
  - Grouping "Quaroni", in Assemini
    - Command Company/ 183rd Infantry Regiment "Nembo"
    - Tactical Group "Gigersa" (XVI Paratroopers Battalion (reinforced)/ 183rd Infantry Regiment "Nembo")
    - Tactical Group "Lusena" (XV Paratroopers Battalion (reinforced)/ 183rd Infantry Regiment "Nembo")
    - Tactical Group "Conte" (CLXXXIV Paratroopers Sappers Battalion (reinforced))
  - Grouping "Renzoni", in Serramanna
    - Command Company/ 184th Infantry Regiment "Nembo"
    - Tactical Group "Rizzati" (XII Paratroopers Battalion (reinforced)/ 184th Infantry Regiment "Nembo")
    - Tactical Group "Corrias" (XIV Paratroopers Battalion (reinforced)/ 184th Infantry Regiment "Nembo")
  - Grouping "Invrea", in Marrubiu
    - Tactical Group "Del Vita" (XIII Paratroopers Battalion (reinforced)/ 184th Infantry Regiment "Nembo")
    - Tactical Group "Cadeddu" (attached: III Squadrons Group "Cavalleggeri di Sardegna")
  - Tactical Group "Valletti" (X/bis Paratroopers Battalion (reinforced)/ 183rd Infantry Regiment "Nembo") in Fertilia
  - Maneuver Grouping "Tantillo" in Sanluri (attached M14/41 tank unit from the 32nd Tank Infantry Regiment)

=== Armistice of Cassibile ===
The announcement of the Armistice of Cassibile on 8 September 1943 and the total lack of communication, orders or news from Rome led to a split in the division: The XII Paratroopers Battalion of the 184th Infantry Regiment "Nembo" decided to side with the Germans. Together with individual soldiers, the battalion began to retreat with the German 90th Panzergrenadier Division towards Corsica. The division's Chief of Staff Lieutenant Colonel Alberto Bechi Luserna followed the mutinous troops to try to convince them to return to their positions and respect the chain of command; on 9 September, near Borore, he caught up with them and was killed together with one of the accompanying Carabinieri officers. The mutineers then dumped his body into the sea when they crossed the Strait of Bonifacio to Corsica. For his courage, Luserna was awarded Italy's highest military honour, the Gold Medal of Military Valor.

Following these events, the Armed Forces Command Sardinia ordered the XIII Army Corps to keep the division under strict surveillance and away from combat operations. Meanwhile, the division's commander disbanded the X/bis Paratroopers Battalion of the 183rd Infantry Regiment "Nembo" and the 284th Paratrooper Cyclists Company, both of which were deemed unreliable.

=== Italian Co-belligerent Army ===
The 184th Artillery Regiment returned to mainland Italy in January 1944, where its two groups were equipped with more powerful 75/27 field guns and 100/22 howitzers. In May the rest of the division was transferred to mainland Italy and joined the Italian Co-belligerent Army's Italian Liberation Corps. On 22 May 1944 the 184th Infantry Regiment "Nembo" entered combat followed by the rest of the division on 31 May. For the Battle of Ancona in July 1944, the Italian Liberation Corps was assigned to the Polish II Corps. In this battle the Nembo distinguished itself in the liberation of Filottrano, earning the 183rd Infantry Regiment "Nembo" a Bronze Medal of Military Valor and the 184th Infantry Regiment "Nembo" a War Cross of Military Valor.

The regiment received a third group equipped with British QF 6-pounder anti-tank guns in August 1944. The division and most of its units were disbanded on 24 September 1944, with the personnel being used to form the Paratroopers Regiment "Nembo" and various support units for the newly activated Combat Group "Folgore", which was equipped with British materiel and uniforms. The 184th Artillery Regiment "Nembo" was assigned to the Combat Group "Folgore", renamed Artillery Regiment "Folgore", and re-equipped with British guns.

The Combat Group "Folgore" fought at Tossignano in March 1945, and on 19 April 1945 the II Battalion of the Paratroopers Regiment "Nembo" fought a heavy battle against the Fallschirmjäger of the German 1. Fallschirmjäger-Division at Case Grizzano. The paratroopers of the Nembo expelled the Germans from their positions at Case Grizzano and then defeated five German counterattacks, which opened the way for the allied armies to liberate Bologna. During the battle the commander of the battalion, Lieutenant Colonel Giuseppe Izzo, was gravely injured and, when transported to the rear, was immediately awarded the American Distinguished Service Cross, making him the only Italian recipient of the award during World War II. Shortly afterwards, Lieutenant Colonel Giuseppe Izzo was awarded the Gold Medal of Military Valor.

=== Post War ===
The Combat Group "Folgore" was renamed Infantry Division "Folgore" on 15 October 1945, which included, among other units, the Paratroopers Regiment "Nembo" and 184th Artillery Regiment "Nembo". On 1 December 1948, the Paratroopers Regiment "Nembo" was renamed 183rd Infantry Regiment "Nembo" and remained one of the Folgore division's infantry units until the 1975 army reform, when it was reduced to the 183rd Mechanized Infantry Battalion Nembo and assigned to the Mechanized Brigade "Gorizia". On 1 July 1953, the personnel and equipment of the 184th Artillery Regiment "Nembo" were used to reform the 5th Mountain Artillery Regiment.

== Organization ==
=== 184th Infantry Division "Nembo" ===
184th Infantry Division "Nembo" organization in April 1943

- 184th Infantry Division "Nembo"
  - Headquarters
    - Command Company
    - 324th Carabinieri Section
    - 146th Field Post Office
  - 183rd Infantry Regiment "Nembo"
    - Command Company
    - X/bis Paratroopers Battalion (renamed X Paratroopers Battalion after the original X Paratroopers Battalion was disbanded in Egypt after the Battle of Alam el Halfa)
    - XV Paratroopers Battalion
    - XVI Paratroopers Battalion
    - 183rd Cannons Company (47/32 mod. 35 anti-tank guns)
  - 184th Infantry Regiment "Nembo"
    - Command Company
    - XII Paratroopers Battalion
    - XIII Paratroopers Battalion
    - XIV Paratroopers Battalion
    - 184th Cannons Company (47/32 mod. 35 anti-tank guns)
  - 185th Infantry Regiment "Nembo"
    - Command Company
    - III Paratroopers Battalion
    - VIII Paratroopers Battalion
    - XI Paratroopers Battalion
    - 185th Cannons Company (47/32 mod. 35 anti-tank guns)
  - 184th Artillery Regiment "Nembo"
    - Command Unit
    - I Paratroopers Artillery Group (47/32 mod. 35 anti-tank guns)
    - II Paratroopers Artillery Group (47/32 mod. 35 anti-tank guns)
    - III Paratroopers Artillery Group (47/32 mod. 35 anti-tank guns)
    - 2 × Anti-aircraft batteries (20/65 Mod. 35 anti-aircraft guns)
    - Services Battery
  - CLXXXIV Paratroopers Sappers Battalion
  - 184th Motorcyclists Company
  - 184th Mortar Company (81mm Mod. 35 mortars)
  - 184th Telegraph and Radio Operators Company (renamed 185th Connections Company in June 1942)
  - 184th Engineer Company
  - 184th Transport Unit
  - 184th Medical Section
  - 184th Supply Section

Attached to the division in Sardinia:

- Squadrons Group "Cavalleggeri di Sardegna" (L6/40 tanks)

=== Combat Group "Folgore" ===
Combat Group "Folgore" organization

- Combat Group "Folgore"
  - Command Company
  - British Eighth Army Liaison Squad
  - Paratroopers Regiment "Nembo"
    - Command Company
    - 3 × Paratrooper battalions
    - Anti-tank Company (QF 6-pounder anti-tank guns)
    - Mortar Company (ML 3-inch mortars)
  - Navy Regiment "San Marco"
    - Command Company
    - I Battalion "Bafile"
    - II Battalion "Grado"
    - III Battalion "Caorle"
    - Anti-tank Company (QF 6-pounder anti-tank guns)
    - Mortar Company (ML 3-inch mortars)
  - Paratroopers Artillery Regiment "Folgore"
    - Command Unit
    - I Group (QF 25-pounder field guns)
    - II Group (QF 25-pounder field guns)
    - III Group (QF 25-pounder field guns)
    - IV Group (QF 25-pounder field guns)
    - V Anti-tank Group (QF 17-pounder anti-tank guns)
    - VI Anti-aircraft Group (QF 40mm anti-aircraft guns)
  - CLXXXIV Engineer Battalion
    - 10th Engineer Company
    - 184th Engineer Company
    - 184th Teleradio Company
  - Transport and Supply Company
  - Mobile Artillery and Engineer Materiel Depot
  - Medical Section
    - 2 × Field hospitals
    - 1 × Surgical unit
  - Maintenance Workshop
  - 2 × Carabinieri sections

== Commanding officers ==
The division's commanding officer was:

- Generale di Brigata Ercole Ronco (1 November 1942 - September 1943)
- Generale di Brigata Giorgio Morigi (1943 - 1944)

== See also ==
- Paracadutisti
- Paratroopers Brigade "Folgore" present day Italian Army airborne brigade
