= 183rd Paratroopers Regiment "Nembo" =

Active Italian Army paratroopers unit

- 183° Reggimento Paracadutisti "Nembo"
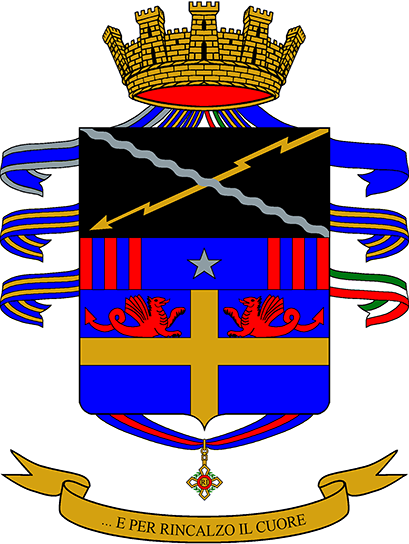
- Regimental coat of arms
- Active: 1 Feb. 1943 — 1 May 1991; 31 May 1991 — today
- Country: Italy
- Branch: Italian Army
- Part of: Paratroopers Brigade "Folgore"
- Garrison/HQ: Pistoia
- Motto: "...e per rincalzo il cuore"
- Anniversaries: 19 April 1945 – Battle of Grizzano
- Decorations: 1× Military Order of Italy; 1x Silver Medal of Military Valor; 1x Bronze Medal of Military Valor; 1x Silver Medal of Army Valor; 2x Bronze Medals of Army Valor; 1x Silver Medal of Civil Valor

Insignia
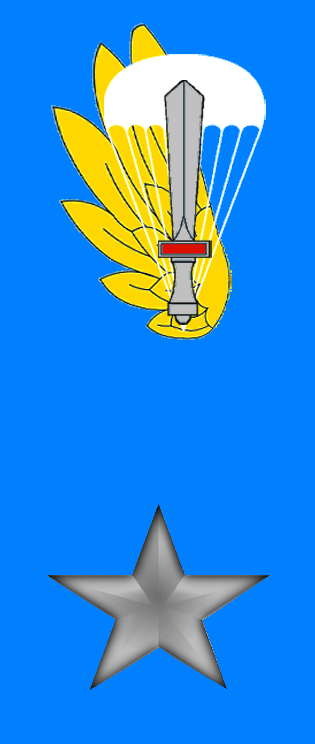
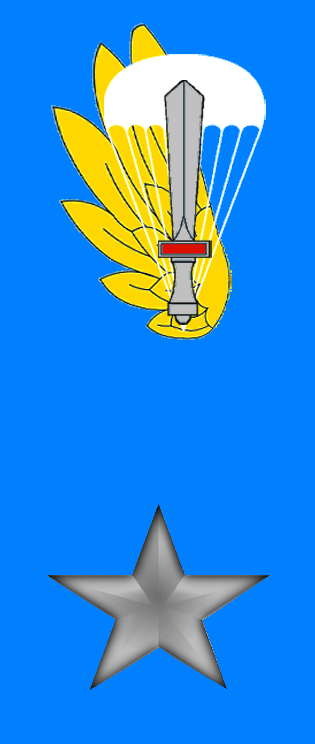
- Paratroopers gorget patches

The 183rd Paratroopers Regiment "Nembo" (Italian: 183° Reggimento Paracadutisti "Nembo") is a paratroopers unit of the Italian Army based in Pistoia in Tuscany. The regiment is part of the Italian Army's infantry arm's Paracadutisti speciality and assigned to the Paratroopers Brigade "Folgore".

The 183rd Infantry Regiment "Nembo" was formed in February 1943 as the Royal Italian Army's fifth paratroopers regiment. The regiment was assigned to the 184th Infantry Division "Nembo", with which the regiment deployed to Sardinia. After the announcement of the Armistice of Cassibile on 8 September 1943 the regiment joined the Italian Co-belligerent Army and fought against the Germans in the Italian campaign. In September 1944, the remnants of the regiment and of its sister regiment, the 184th Infantry Regiment "Nembo", were merged to form the Paratroopers Regiment "Nembo", which was assigned to the Combat Group "Friuli" and equipped with British materiel. The Combat Group "Folgore" then entered the front on the allied side and fought against the German forces in Italy until the end of the war.

In 1945, the Combat Group "Folgore" was renamed Infantry Division "Folgore" and in 1948, the Paratroopers Regiment "Nembo" was renamed 183rd Infantry Regiment "Nembo". In 1975, the regiment was disbanded and the regiment's IV Mechanized Battalion became an autonomous unit, which was renamed 183rd Mechanized Infantry Battalion "Nembo". After the regiment was disbanded, the flag and traditions of the 183rd Infantry Regiment "Nembo" were transferred to the 183rd Mechanized Infantry Battalion "Nembo". The battalion was based in Gradisca d'Isonzo and assigned to the Mechanized Brigade "Gorizia". On 1 May 1991, the battalion was disbanded and at the end of the same month, on 31 May 1991, it was reformed as 183rd Paratroopers Battalion "Nembo" in Pistoia in Tuscany. The reformed battalion was assigned to the Paratroopers Brigade "Folgore". In 1993, the battalion lost its autonomy and entered the reformed 183rd Paratroopers Regiment "Nembo". The regiment's anniversary falls on 19 April 1945, the day the Paratroopers Regiment "Nembo" defeated German forces at Case Grizzano and opened the way for the allied armies to liberate Bologna.

== History ==
=== World War II ===
On 1 February 1943, the Royal Italian Army formed the 183rd Infantry Regiment "Nembo" at the Royal Italian Air Force's Paratroopers School Tarquinia. The new regiment consisted of a command, a command company, the VIII/bis, XV, and XVI paratroopers battalions, and the 183rd Cannons Company, which was equipped with 47/32 mod. 35 anti-tank guns. After its formation the regiment moved from Tarquinia to Florence, where it joined the 184th Infantry Division "Nembo". On 24 May 1943, the regiments of the 184th Infantry Division "Nembo" received their flags in a ceremony in Florence. Also in May 1943, the regiment exchanged its VIII/bis Paratroopers Battalion with the X/bis Paratroopers Battalion of the 185th Infantry Regiment "Nembo". Afterwards the 183rd Infantry Regiment "Nembo" consisted of the following units:

- 183rd Infantry Regiment "Nembo"
  - Command Company
  - X/bis Paratroopers Battalion
    - 28th/bis, 29th/bis, and 30th/bis Company
  - XV Paratroopers Battalion
    - 43rd, 44th, and 45th Company
  - XVI Paratroopers Battalion
    - 46th, 47th, and 48th Company
  - 183rd Cannons Company (47/32 mod. 35 anti-tank guns)

==== Sardinia ====
In early June 1943, the 184th Infantry Division "Nembo" was transferred to the island of Sardinia and assigned to XIII Army Corps, which was responsible for the defense of the southern half of the island. The division was divided into three tactical groups, which were dispersed in the island's south-western region of Campidano. The tactical groups were intended to act as rapid reinforcements for the coastal units garrisoning the beaches, where allied forces were expected to land.

In the evening of 8 September 1943, the Armistice of Cassibile, which ended hostilities between the Kingdom of Italy and the Anglo-American Allies, was announced by General Dwight D. Eisenhower on Radio Algiers and by Marshal Pietro Badoglio on Italian radio. The Germans reacted by invading Italy and the XII Paratroopers Battalion of the 184th Infantry Regiment "Nembo" sided with the invaders. Together with soldiers from other units of the division, the XII Paratroopers Battalion retreated with the German 90th Panzergrenadier Division towards Corsica. The "Nembo" division's Chief of Staff Lieutenant Colonel Alberto Bechi Luserna pursued the mutinous troops to try to convince them to return to their positions and respect the chain of command. On 9 September 1943, near Borore Bechi Luserna caught up with the retreating troops, who killed him and one of the accompanying Carabinieri officers. The mutineers then dumped his body into the sea, when they crossed the Strait of Bonifacio to Corsica. For his courage Alberto Bechi Luserna was awarded Italy's highest military honor the Gold Medal of Military Valor. Following these events, the Armed Forces Command Sardinia ordered the XIII Army Corps to keep the "Nembo" division under strict surveillance and away from combat operations. Furthermore, the "Nembo" division's commander ordered to disband the X/bis Paratroopers Battalion of the 183rd Infantry Regiment "Nembo" as the battalion's personnel was deemed unreliable.

==== Italian campaign ====
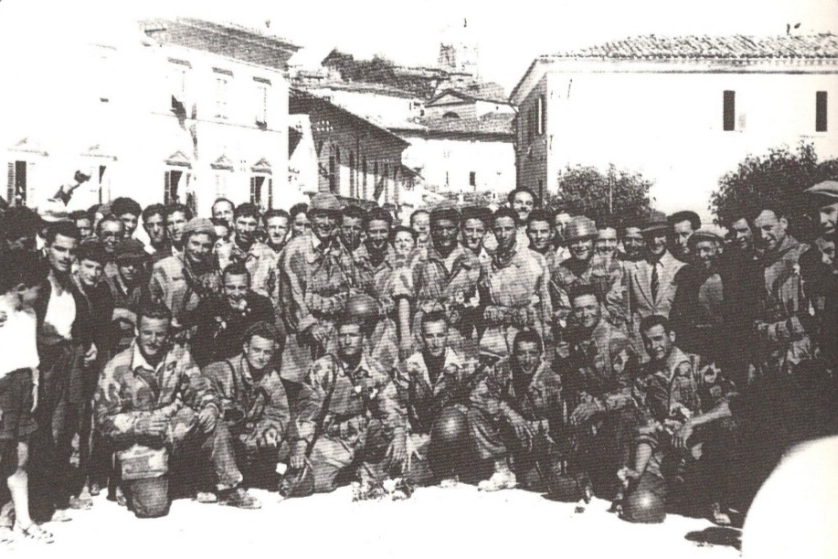
Paratroopers of the 184th Infantry Division "Nembo" after the liberation of Sarnano in June 1944

In May 1944, the "Nembo" division was transferred to mainland Italy, where it joined the Italian Co-belligerent Army's Italian Liberation Corps. On 22 May 1944, the 184th Infantry Regiment "Nembo" entered combat followed by the rest of the division on 31 May. In July 1944, during the Battle of Ancona, the Italian Liberation Corps was assigned to the Polish II Corps. In this battle the "Nembo" division distinguished itself in the liberation of Filottrano, earning the 183rd Infantry Regiment "Nembo" a Bronze Medal of Military Valor and the 184th Infantry Regiment "Nembo" a War Cross of Military Valor.

On 24 September 1944, the division, its two infantry regiments, and most of the division's support units were disbanded and the personnel used to form the Paratroopers Regiment "Nembo" and the support units of the newly formed Combat Group "Folgore". The combat group consisted of the Paratroopers Regiment "Nembo", the Royal Italian Navy's Marine Regiment "San Marco", the Paratroopers Artillery Regiment "Folgore", and the CLXXXIV Mixed Engineer Battalion. Both regiments consisted of a command, three infantry battalions, a mortar company equipped with British ML 3 inch mortars, and an anti-tank company equipped with British QF 6-pounder guns. Dressed in British uniforms the combat group was assigned to the British XIII Corps, with which it fought in the Italian Campaign.

In March 1945, the combat group fought at Tossignano. On 19 April 1945, the II Battalion of the Paratroopers Regiment "Nembo" fought a heavy battle against the Fallschirmjäger of the German 1. Fallschirmjäger-Division at Case Grizzano. The paratroopers of the Nembo expelled the Germans from their positions at Case Grizzano and then defeated five German counterattacks, which opened the way for the allied armies to liberate Bologna. During the battle the commander of the battalion, Lieutenant Colonel Giuseppe Izzo, was gravely injured and, when he was transported to the rear, was immediately awarded the American Distinguished Service Cross, making him the only Italian recipient of the award in all of World War II. Shortly afterwards Lieutenant Colonel Giuseppe Izzo was also awarded Italy's highest military honor the Gold Medal of Military Valor.

On 20 April 1945, the paratroopers of the 1st Reconnaissance Squadron "Folgore" (Squadron "F"), which had been formed with the personnel of the 9th Company/ III Paratroopers Battalion of the 185th Infantry Regiment "Nembo" and been reinforced twice with paratroopers of the Paratroopers Regiment "Nembo", jumped during Operation Herring, the war's final airborne combat drop, into the area of Poggio Rusco. For its conduct at Tossignano, Case Grizzano, and Poggio Rusco the Paratroopers Regiment "Nembo" was awarded a Silver Medal of Military Valor, which was affixed to the regiment's flag.

=== Cold War ===
After the war's end the Paratroopers Regiment "Nembo" remained assigned to the Combat Group "Folgore", which, on 15 October 1945, was renamed Infantry Division "Folgore". Initially the regiment was based in Arezzo, but in 1946 it moved to Pistoia, and in 1947 to Belluno. On 1 December 1948, the Paratroopers Regiment "Nembo" was renamed 183rd Infantry Regiment "Nembo" and consisted of the following units:

- 183rd Infantry Regiment "Nembo", in Belluno
  - Command Company
  - I Battalion
  - II Battalion
  - III Battalion
  - Mortar Company (81mm Mod. 35 mortars)
  - Anti-tank Cannons Company (QF 6-pounder anti-tank guns)

In 1953, the regiment moved from Belluno to Cervignano del Friuli. In October 1963, the regiment's troops were sent to Longarone to help rescue efforts after the Vajont dam disaster. For its conduct in Longarone the regiment was awarded a Silver Medal of Civil Valor, which was affixed to the regiment's flag and added to the regiment's coat of arms.

During the 1975 army reform the Italian Army disbanded the regimental level and newly independent battalions were granted for the first time their own flags. On 20 October 1975, the 183rd Infantry Regiment "Nembo" and three of its four battalions were disbanded. The next day the regiment's IV Mechanized Battalion in Gradisca d'Isonzo became an autonomous unit and was renamed 183rd Mechanized Infantry Battalion "Nembo". The battalion was assigned to the Mechanized Brigade "Gorizia" and consisted of a command, a command and services company, three mechanized companies with M113 armored personnel carriers, and a heavy mortar company with M106 mortar carriers with 120mm Mod. 63 mortars. At the time the battalion fielded 896 men (45 officers, 100 non-commissioned officers, and 751 soldiers).

On 12 November 1976, the President of the Italian Republic Giovanni Leone assigned with decree 846 the flag and traditions of the 183rd Infantry Regiment "Nembo" to the battalion.

For its conduct and work after the 1976 Friuli earthquake the battalion was awarded a Bronze Medal of Army Valor, which was affixed to the battalion's flag and added to the battalion's coat of arms.

=== Recent times ===
On 31 January 1991, the 87th Motorized Infantry Battalion "Senio" was disbanded in Pistoia and its base taken over by the Paratroopers Brigade "Folgore". On 1 May 1991, the 183rd Mechanized Infantry Battalion "Nembo" was disbanded in Gradisca d'Isonzo and its companies and base taken over by the 41st Mechanized Infantry Battalion "Modena". Afterwards, the flag of the 183rd Infantry Regiment "Nembo" travelled to Pistoia, where, on 31 May 1991, the battalion was reformed as 183rd Paratroopers Battalion "Nembo". The battalion received the flag and traditions of the 183rd Infantry Regiment "Nembo" and was assigned to the Paratroopers Brigade "Folgore".

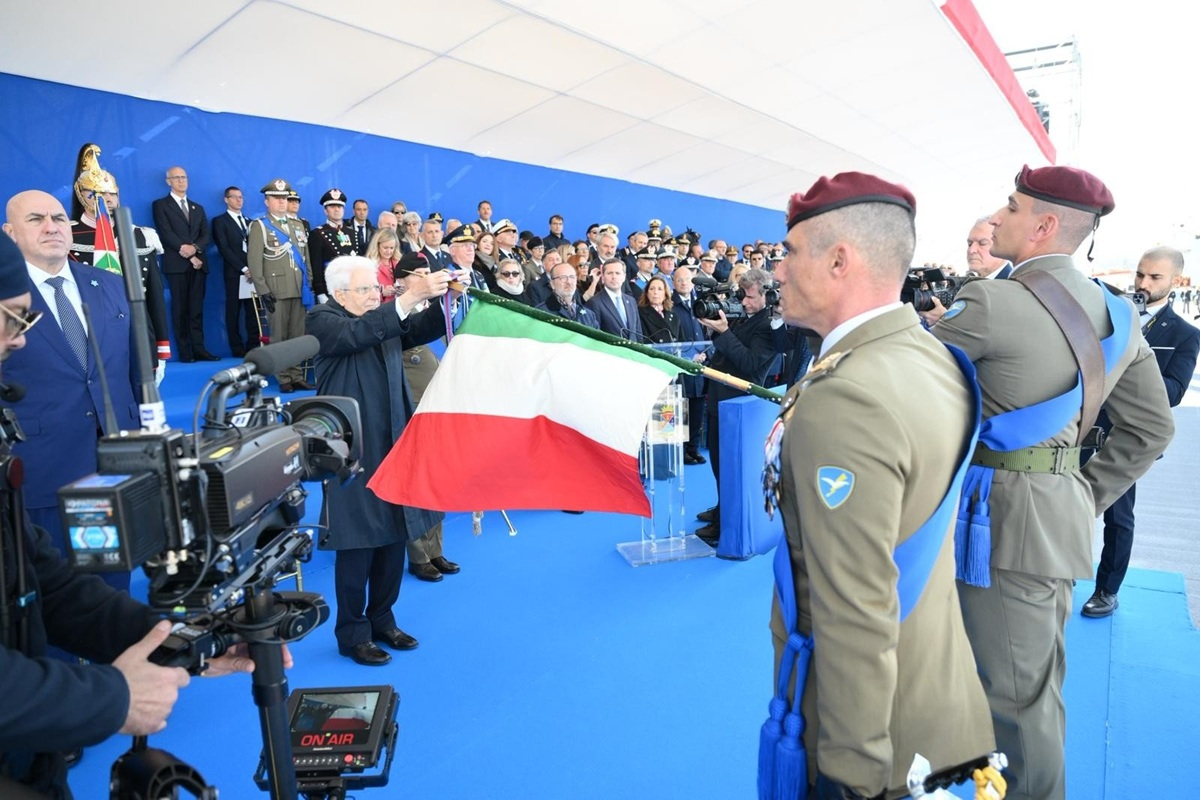
Italian President Sergio Mattarella decorates the flag of the 183rd Paratroopers Regiment "Nembo" with the Military Order of Italy on 4 November 2025

On 22 April 1993, the 183rd Paratroopers Battalion "Nembo" lost its autonomy and the next day the battalion entered the reformed 183rd Paratroopers Regiment "Nembo" as I Paratroopers Battalion "Grizzano". On the same day, the flag and traditions of the 183rd Infantry Regiment "Nembo" were transferred from the battalion to the reformed regiment. From 21 May to 7 September 1993, the regiment deployed to Somalia for the American-led Unified Task Force. For its conduct in Somalia the regiment's was awarded a Silver Medal of Army Valor, which was affixed to the regiment's flag and added to its coat of arms.

From 3 April to 20 October 2009, the regiment was deployed to Afghanistan for the NATO-led International Security Assistance Force. For its conduct in Afghanistan the regiment was awarded a Bronze Medal of Army Valor, which was affixed to the regiment's flag and added to its coat of arms. In 2025, the President of the Italian Republic Sergio Mattarella awarded the regiment the Military Order of Italy for the regiment's conduct during its two deployments to Afghanistan and one deployment to Lebanon.

== Organization ==
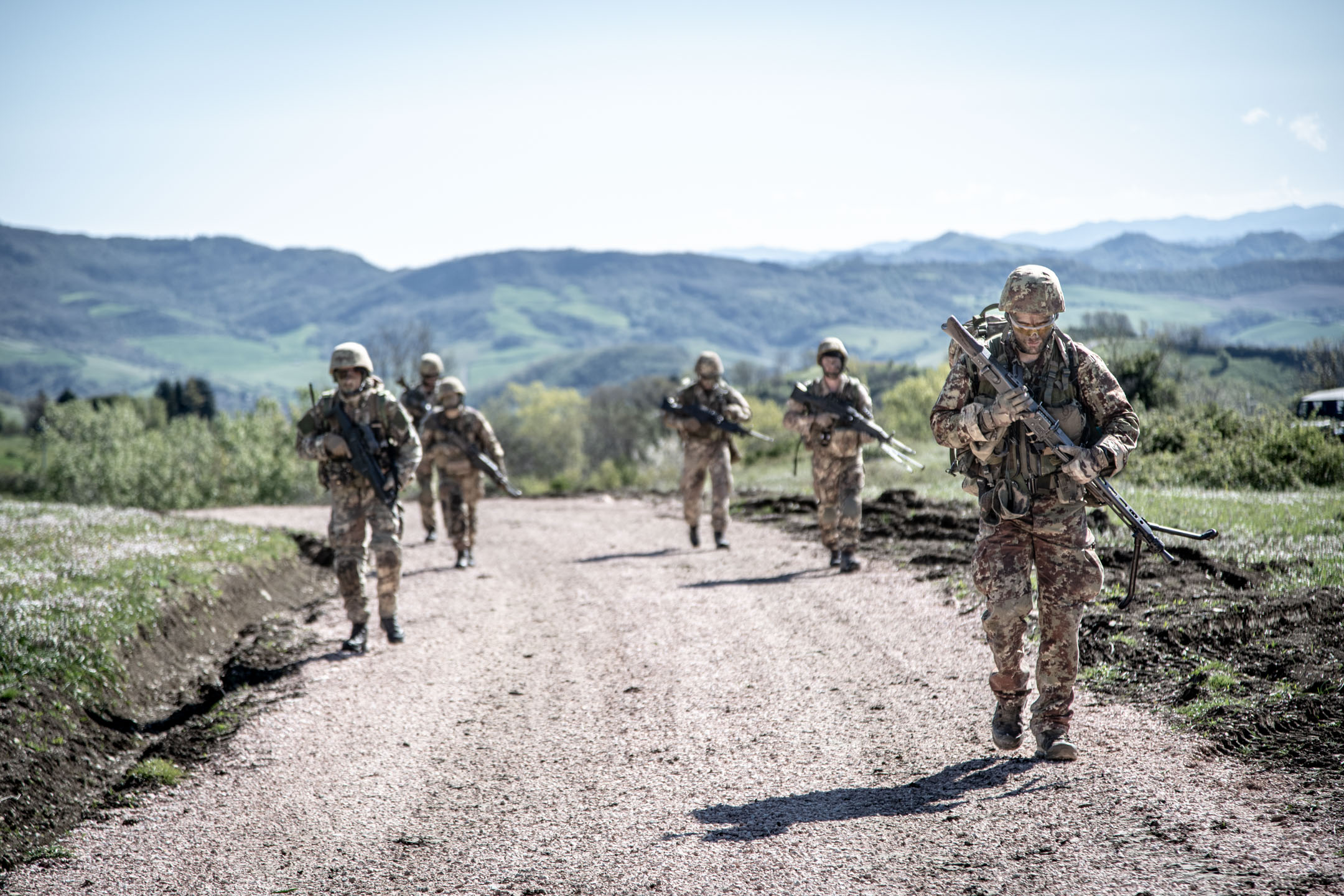
183rd Paratroopers Regiment "Nembo" patrol during an exercise in 2023

As of 2025 the 183rd Paratroopers Regiment "Nembo" is organized as follows:

- 183rd Paratroopers Regiment "Nembo", in Pistoia
  - Command and Logistic Support Company
  - 1st Paratroopers Battalion "Grizzano"
    - 12th Paratroopers Maneuver Support Company
    - 18th Paratroopers Company
    - 19th Paratroopers Company
    - 20th Paratroopers Company

The regiment is equipped with VTLM Lince vehicles. The 12th Paratroopers Maneuver Support Company is equipped with MO-120 RT 120mm mortars and Spike LR anti-tank guided missiles.

== See also ==
- Paratroopers Brigade "Folgore"
