= 33rd Artillery Regiment "Acqui" =

Inactive Italian Army artillery unit

- 33° Reggimento Artiglieria "Acqui"
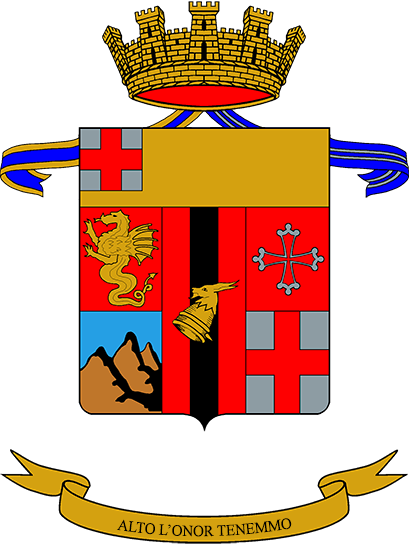
- Regimental coat of arms
- Active: 1 Jan. 1915 — 1 Aug. 1920; 4 Sept. 1939 — 22 Sept. 1943; 1 Feb 1947 — 28 June 2013
- Country: Italy
- Branch: Italian Army
- Part of: Mechanized Brigade "Granatieri di Sardegna"
- Garrison/HQ: L'Aquila
- Motto: "Alto l'onor tenemmo"
- Anniversaries: 15 June 1918 - Second Battle of the Piave River
- Decorations: 1x Gold Medal of Military Valor; 1x War Cross of Military Valor

Insignia
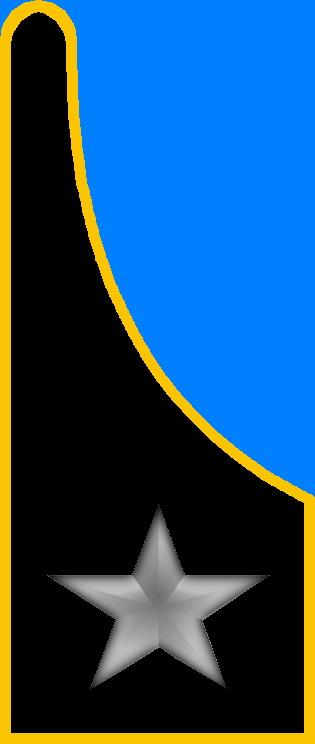
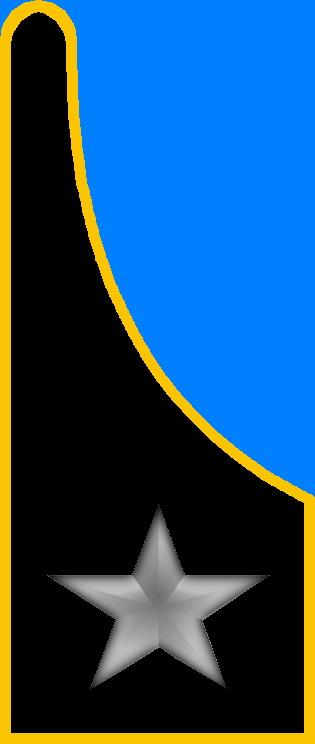
- Regimental gorget patches

The 33rd Artillery Regiment "Acqui" (Italian: 33° Reggimento Artiglieria "Acqui") is an inactive field artillery regiment of the Italian Army, which was based in L'Aquila in Abruzzo. Originally an artillery regiment of the Royal Italian Army, the regiment was formed in 1915 and served in World War I, before being disbanded after the war. The regiment was reformed in 1939 and assigned in World War II to the 33rd Infantry Division "Acqui", with which the regiment fought in the Greco-Italian War. The division and regiment were located on the Greek island of Cephalonia when the Armistice of Cassibile was announced on 8 September 1943. The division refused German demands to surrender and fought German forces landing on the island. On 22 September the division surrendered and afterwards the Germans shot the division's officers and most its troops.

The regiment was reformed in 1947 and assigned to the Infantry Division "Folgore". In 1976 the regiment was reduced to 33rd Heavy Self-propelled Field Artillery Group "Terni" and assigned to the Mechanized Division "Folgore". In 1986 the group was transferred to 5th Army Corps and in 1993 the group was reorganized as regiment. In 1995 the regiment took over the personnel, materiel and base of the disbanded 48th Self-propelled Field Artillery Regiment "Taro" and was assigned to the Mechanized Brigade "Acqui". In 1996 the regiment was transferred to the Mechanized Brigade "Granatieri di Sardegna". In 2013 the regiment's was disbanded. The regimental anniversary falls, as for all Italian Army artillery regiments, on June 15, the beginning of the Second Battle of the Piave River in 1918.

== History ==
On 1 January 1915 the 33rd Field Artillery Regiment was formed in Terni with five batteries ceded by the 1st Field Artillery Regiment (4th and 5th battery) and the 13th Field Artillery Regiment (6th, 7th, and 8th battery).

=== World War I ===
At the outbreak of World War I the regiment was assigned, together with the Brigade "Alpi" and Brigade "Calabria", to the 18th Division. At the time the regiment consisted of a command, three groups with a combined eight batteries equipped with 75/27 mod. 11 field guns, a reserve pack battery with 70/15 mountain guns, and a depot. During the war the regiment's depot in Terni formed the command of the 56th Field Artillery Regiment and the command of the 3rd Mixed Artillery Grouping. The depot also formed the 115th Mountain Artillery Battery and two siege batteries.

During the war the regiment served on the Italian front, where it fought in summer 1915 on Costone di Salesci and on the flanks of the Col di Lana and in fall of the year on the Sasso di Mezzodì, Monte Livine and on Monte Sief. In April 1916 the regiment returned to the Col di Lana, and then was sent to fight on the glacier of the Marmolada. Afterwards the regiment returned to Monte Sief. In fall 1917 the regiment was deployed on Monte Sief again, but after the defeat in the Battle of Caporetto the Italian armies were forced to fall back to the Piave, where the regiment fought at Vidor and then Monfenera during the First Battle of the Piave River. In December 1917 the regiment was arrayed on Col della Berretta. The year 1918 began for the regiment on Monte Asolone. In the Second Battle of the Piave River in June 1918 the regiment was positioned on the Col del Miglio. During the decisive Battle of Vittorio Veneto the regiment was on Col del Miglio and Col della Berretta, where the news of the Armistice of Villa Giusti reached the regiment.

On 1 August 1920 the regiment was disbanded and its units and base were transferred to the 7th Heavy Field Artillery Regiment, which in 1926 became the 8th Heavy Field Artillery Regiment.

=== World War II ===
On 4 September 1939 the depot of the 9th Artillery Regiment "Brennero" in Bolzano reformed the command of the 33rd Artillery Regiment "Acqui". The regiment was based in Meran and assigned to the 33rd Infantry Division "Acqui", which also included the 17th Infantry Regiment "Acqui" and 18th Infantry Regiment "Acqui". The regiment consisted of a command, a command unit, and an anti-aircraft battery with 20/65 mod. 35 anti-aircraft guns, which had all been formed by the depot of the 9th Artillery Regiment "Brennero". Afterwards the Brennero regiment also transferred its I Group with 100/17 mod. 14 howitzers and III Group with 75/13 mod. 15 mountain guns to the reformed regiment. To complete the new regiment's organization the 8th Artillery Regiment "Pasubio" ceded a group with 75/13 mod. 15 mountain guns.

In June 1940 the division participated in the Italian invasion of France. In December 1940 the division was sent to Albania to reinforce the Italian lines in the Greco-Italian War. In March 1941 the division fought in the Battle of Greece. After the Greek surrender the division occupied the islands of Corfu, Lefkada, Zakynthos and Cephalonia.

For its conduct in Albania the 33rd Artillery Regiment "Acqui" was awarded a War Cross of Military Valor, which was affixed on the regiment's flag and is depicted on the regiment's coat of arms.

After the Armistice of Cassibile was announced on 8 September 1943 the division resisted German orders to surrender. In retaliation the Germans executed thousands of the division's soldiers and all the division's officers.

For their sacrifice on Cephalonia the regiments of the 33rd Infantry Division "Acqui" were awarded a Gold Medal of Military Valor, which were affixed on the regiments' flags and are depicted on the regiments' coats of arms.

=== Cold War ===
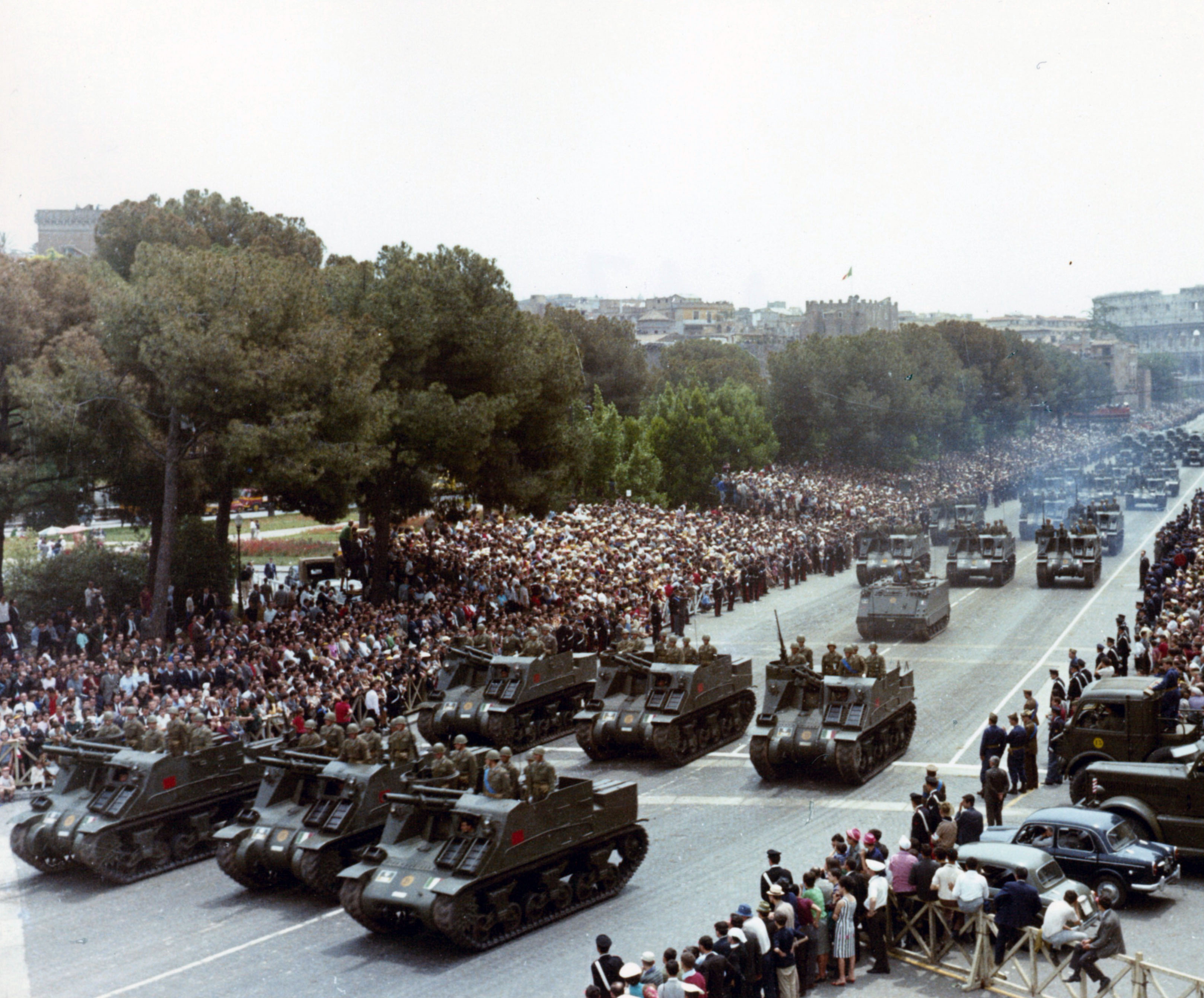
Italian Army M7 Priest self-propelled guns at the 2 June 1960 National Day parade in Rome

On 1 February 1947 the 33rd Field Artillery Regiment was reformed in Pisa with two groups with QF 25-pounder field guns and one anti-aircraft group with 40/56 anti-aircraft autocannons ceded by the 184th Artillery Regiment "Folgore". The regiment was assigned to the Infantry Division "Folgore" and one month later, on 1 March, the regiment ceded the anti-aircraft group to reformed 5th Light Anti-aircraft Artillery Regiment. On 6 June of the same year the regiment moved from Pisa to Padua, where the regiment formed a third group with QF 25-pounder field guns.

On 1 January 1951 the Infantry Division "Folgore" included the following artillery regiments:

- Infantry Division "Folgore", in Treviso
  - 33rd Field Artillery Regiment, in Padua
  - 41st Anti-tank Field Artillery Regiment, in Bassano del Grappa
  - 184th Field Artillery Regiment, in Treviso
  - 5th Light Anti-aircraft Artillery Regiment, in Mestre

On 30 January 1951 the 5th Light Anti-aircraft Artillery Regiment transferred its I Light Anti-aircraft Group to the 33rd Field Artillery Regiment, which on 31 May of the same year disbanded its III Group with QF 25-pounder field guns. On 30 June 1953 the regiment received a group with M114 155 mm towed howitzers from the 9th Heavy Artillery Regiment and two anti-tank groups with M36 tank destroyers from the 184th Field Artillery Regiment. The next day, 1 July 1953, the 184th Field Artillery Regiment in Treviso was disbanded and the 33rd Field Artillery Regiment moved from Padua to Treviso. On 1 January 1954 the regiment consisted of the following units:

- 33rd Field Artillery Regiment, in Treviso
  - Command Unit
  - I Group with QF 25-pounder field guns
  - II Group with QF 25-pounder field guns
  - III Group with M114 155 mm towed howitzers
  - IV Light Anti-aircraft Group with 40/56 anti-aircraft autocannons
  - 3rd Self-propelled Anti-tank Sub-grouping, in Cervignano del Friuli
    - CXIII Anti-tank Group with M36 tank destroyers
    - CXIV Anti-tank Group with M36 tank destroyers

On 31 July 1954 the 3rd Self-propelled Anti-tank Sub-grouping left the regiment and was assigned the next day to the 155th Self-propelled Army Corps Artillery Regiment. On 15 September 1955 the regiment received the I Group with QF 25-pounder field guns of the 21st Field Artillery Regiment, which had been assigned to the Grouping "Trieste" since 15 October 1954. Between April and September 1956 the regiment formed two light aircraft sections with L-21B artillery observation planes. During the same year the Infantry Division "Folgore" transferred its Artillery Specialists Unit to the regiment.

In 1958 the regiment's I and II groups replaced their QF 25-pounder field guns with M101 105 mm towed howitzers, while the III Group was disbanded. On 30 November of the same year the II Self-propelled Group with M7 Priest self-propelled guns left the 1st Armored Artillery Regiment "Pozzuolo del Friuli" and joined the 33rd Field Artillery Regiment the next day and became the regiment's new III Group. On the same day the two light aircraft sections merged to form the Light Aircraft Unit and the Artillery Specialists Unit was expanded to Artillery Specialists Battery. Consequently on 1 December 1958 the regiment consisted of the following units:

- 33rd Field Artillery Regiment, in Treviso
  - Command Unit
  - I Group with M101 105 mm towed howitzers
  - II Group with M101 105 mm towed howitzers
  - III Group with M7 Priest self-propelled guns
  - IV Group with M114 155 mm towed howitzers
  - V Light Anti-aircraft Group with 40/56 anti-aircraft autocannons
  - Artillery Specialists Battery
  - Light Aircraft Unit

On 1 February 1963 the light aircraft units of the 33rd Field Artillery Regiment and 182nd Armored Infantry Regiment "Garibaldi" were merged to form the V Light Aviation Unit, which was assigned to the V Army Corps. On 1 October 1965 the V Light Anti-aircraft Group was placed in reserve status.

During the 1975 army reform the army disbanded the regimental level and newly independent battalions and groups were granted for the first time their own flags: on 31 August the regiment's II Field Artillery Group was disbanded. On 19 October the I Field Artillery Group became an autonomous unit and the next day the group was renamed 46th Field Artillery Group "Trento" and assigned to the Mechanized Brigade "Gorizia". On 31 December 1975 the 33rd Field Artillery Regiment was disbanded and the next day the regiment's III Self-propelled Artillery Group was renamed 33rd Heavy Self-propelled Field Artillery Group "Terni", while the IV Heavy Field Artillery Group was renamed 184th Heavy Self-propelled Field Artillery Group "Filottrano", and the regiment's Command and Services Battery and the regiment's Specialists Battery formed the Artillery Specialists Group "Folgore". The V Light Anti-aircraft Artillery Group was renamed 13th Light Anti-aircraft Artillery Group "Condor" and remained a reserve formation. On the same day the 33rd and 184th groups, as well as the artillery specialists group and light anti-aircraft artillery group, were assigned to the Mechanized Division "Folgore"'s Artillery Command, which had been formed with the personnel of the disbanded regiment's command. To avoid confusion with the support units of the Motorized Brigade "Acqui" the group was named for the city of Terni, where the 33rd Field Artillery Regiment had been formed. The group consisted of a command, a command and services battery, and three batteries with M109G self-propelled howitzers.

On 12 November 1976 the President of the Italian Republic Giovanni Leone assigned with decree 846 the flag and traditions of the 33rd Artillery Regiment "Acqui" to the 33rd Heavy Self-propelled Field Artillery Group "Terni". At the time the group fielded 477 men (38 officers, 62 non-commissioned officers, and 377 soldiers).

On 31 August 1981 the group was equipped with modern FH70 155mm howitzers and renamed 33rd Heavy Field Artillery Group "Terni". In 1986 the Italian Army abolished the divisional level and so on 31 October 1986 the Mechanized Division "Folgore" was disbanded. The next day the group was assigned to the Artillery Command of the 5th Army Corps.

=== Recent times ===
On 22 November 1991 the regiment moved from Treviso to Casarsa della Delizia and on 1 December of the same year the group was assigned to the 5th Heavy Field Artillery Regiment. On 31 March 1993 the 5th Heavy Field Artillery Regiment was disbanded and the 33rd Heavy Field Artillery Group "Terni" became once more an autonomous unit. The next day the group entered the reformed 33rd Heavy Field Artillery Regiment "Acqui".

On 10 September 1995 the batteries of the 33rd Heavy Field Artillery Regiment "Acqui" in Casarsa della Delizia were disbanded and the flag of the regiment traveled to L'Aquila, where the next day it supplanted the flag of the 48th Self-propelled Field Artillery Regiment "Taro". The 33rd Self-propelled Field Artillery Regiment "Acqui", which incorporated the disbanded regiment's personnel, materiel and base, was equipped with M109L 155 mm self-propelled howitzers and assigned to the Mechanized Brigade "Acqui".

As the Mechanized Brigade "Acqui" was scheduled to be disbanded on 30 June 1996 the 33rd Self-propelled Field Artillery Regiment "Acqui" was transferred on 15 May 1996 to the Mechanized Brigade "Granatieri di Sardegna". On 28 June 2013 the 33rd Self-propelled Field Artillery Regiment "Acqui" was disbanded and the flag of the 33rd Artillery Regiment "Acqui" was returned to the Shrine of the Flags in the Vittoriano in Rome.
