= 41st IMINT Regiment "Cordenons" =

Active Italian Army surveillance & target acquisition unit

- 41° Reggimento IMINT "Cordenons"
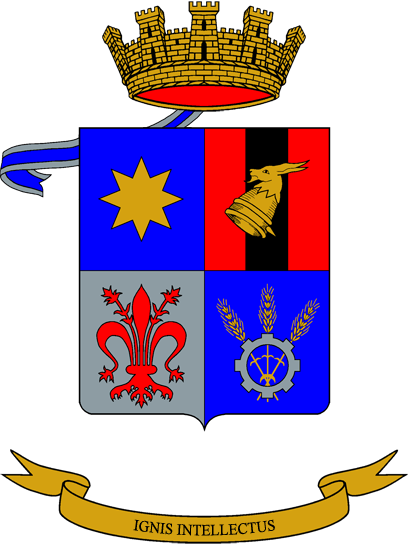
- Regimental coat of arms
- Active: May 1915 – 17 March 1919; 15 Sept. 1939 — 28 Sept. 1943; 1 May 1947 — today
- Country: Italy
- Branch: Italian Army
- Part of: Tactical Intelligence Brigade
- Garrison/HQ: Sora
- Motto: "Ignis intellectus"
- Anniversaries: 15 June 1918 – Second Battle of the Piave River
- Decorations: 1x Silver Medal of Military Valor

Insignia
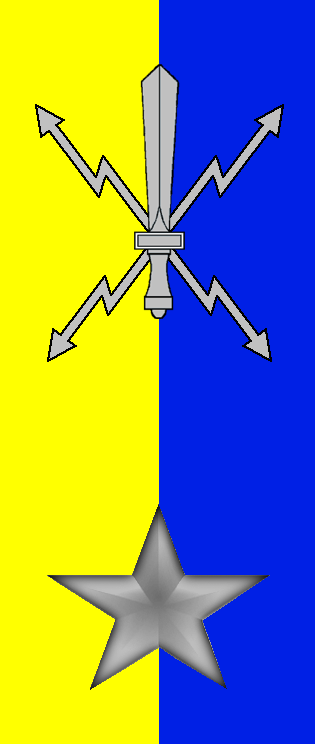
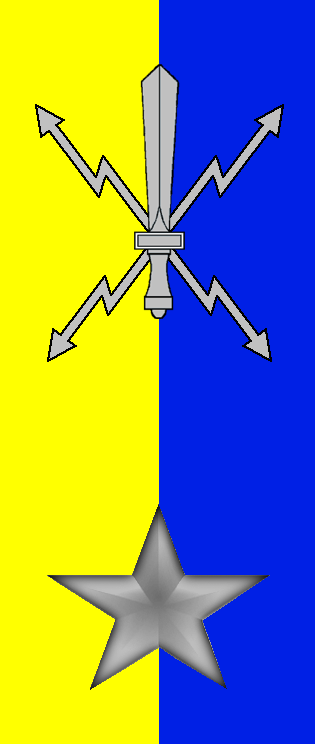
- Regimental gorget patches: < div style=" display:inline-block;" > </ div> < div style=" transform: scaleX(-1);; display:inline-block;" > </ div>

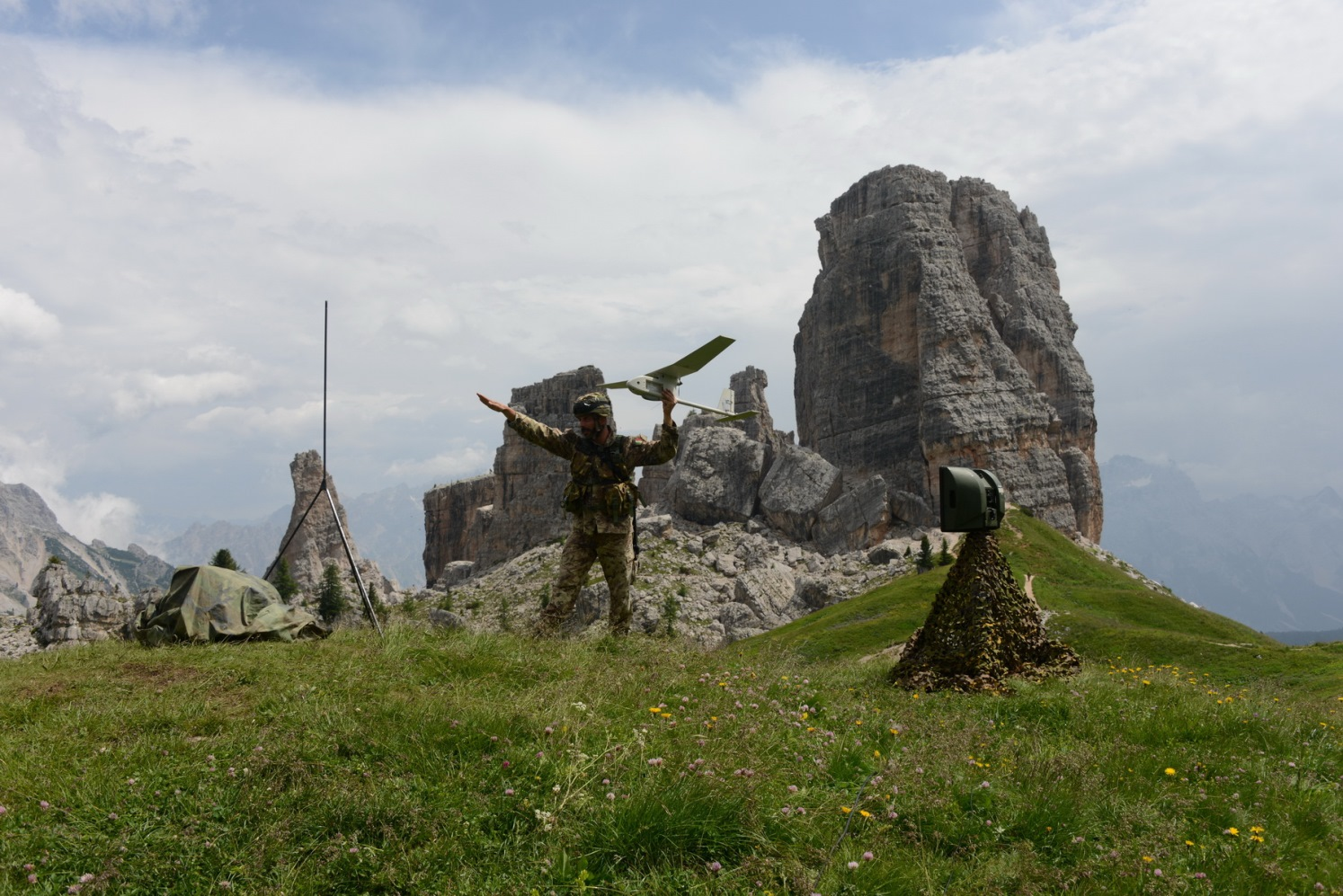
41st "Cordenons" operator launching a RQ-11B Raven in the Dolomites with a Squire radar in the background

The 41st IMINT Regiment "Cordenons" (Italian: 41° Reggimento IMINT "Cordenons") is a Imagery Intelligence unit of the Italian Army. Originally a field artillery regiment, the regiment is today a multi-arms unit operationally assigned to the Tactical Intelligence Brigade, which combines elements of the artillery and signal arms. The regiment is based in Sora in Lazio.

Originally an artillery regiment of the Royal Italian Army, the regiment was formed days before Italy's entry into World War I and disbanded after the war. The regiment was reformed in 1939 and assigned in World War II to the 41st Infantry Division "Firenze", with which the regiment participated in the Invasion of Yugoslavia. The division and regiment were located in Macedonia when the Armistice of Cassibile was announced on 8 September 1943. The division clashed with German forces and then negotiated with the Yugoslav partisans about joining forces against the Germans. On 28 September 1943 the division and its units disbanded and the personnel then joined the partisans.

The regiment was reformed in 1947 and assigned to the Infantry Division "Folgore". In 1951 the regiment was transferred to the V Army Corps. In 1976 the regiment was disbanded and its flag and traditions were assigned to the 41st Artillery Specialists Group "Cordenons", which was the 5th Army Corps' target acquisition unit. In 1977 the group was transferred to the 3rd Missile Brigade "Aquileia" and in 1986 it returned to 5th Army Corps. In 2001 the group was expanded to regiment. In 2004 the regiment was assigned to the RISTA-EW Brigade and reorganized a battlefield surveillance unit. The regimental anniversary falls, as for all Italian Army artillery regiments, on June 15, the beginning of the Second Battle of the Piave River in 1918.

== History ==
=== World War I ===
In May 1915, just days before Italy's entry into World War I, the 41st Field Artillery Regiment was formed in Venaria Reale by the depot of the 5th Field Artillery Regiment. The new regiment was assigned, together with the Brigade "Treviso" and Brigade "Ivrea", to the 34th Division and consisted of a command and two groups with a combined six batteries equipped with 75/27 mod. 06 field guns.

During the war the regiment served on the Italian front, where it fought in summer 1915 on Cima Vezzena. In May 1916 the regiment was transferred to the upper Val d'Assa on the Asiago plateau to help stem the Austria Asiago Offensive. During that battle the regiment also served on Monte Pan and Monte Lemerle. In November 1916 the regiment participated in the Ninth Battle of the Isonzo on the Pečinka and at Lokvica. For the Tenth Battle of the Isonzo in May 1917 the regiment was arrayed at Dosso Faiti and Kostanjevica. In August the regiment was deployed at Korita for the Eleventh Battle of the Isonzo. The regiment retreated with the army after the defeat in the Battle of Caporetto to the Tagliamento river and fought a delaying action at Madrisio before falling back to the Piave, where the regiment fought in the First Battle of the Piave River at Ponte della Priula. For the rest of 1917 and the January 1918 the regiment was deployed at Zenson. In the Second Battle of the Piave River in June 1918 the regiment was positioned near Fagarè. For the rest of the summer the regiment operated in Cortellazzo. During the decisive Battle of Vittorio Veneto the regiment was in the Val Giudicarie.

After the war the regiment was disbanded on 17 March 1919.

=== World War II ===
On 15 September 1939 the depot of the 19th Artillery Regiment "Venezia" in Florence reformed the 41st Artillery Regiment "Firenze". The regiment was based in Florence and assigned to the 41st Infantry Division "Firenze", which also included the 127th Infantry Regiment "Firenze" and 128th Infantry Regiment "Firenze". The regiment consisted of a command, a command unit, the I Group with 100/17 mod. 14 howitzers, the II Group with 75/27 mod. 11 field guns, and the 10th Anti-aircraft Battery with 20/65 mod. 35 anti-aircraft guns. A few weeks later the regiment received a III Group with 75/27 mod. 11 field guns, but already in November the group replaced its 75/27 mod. 11 field guns with 75/18 mod. 34 mountain guns. On 1 December 1940 the regiment transferred its III Group with 75/18 mod. 34 mountain guns to the 27th Artillery Regiment "Cuneo" in exchange for a group with 75/27 mod. 11 field guns.

In March 1941 the division was sent to Albania for the Invasion of Yugoslavia in April 1941. After the invasion the division remained in Macedonia and Montenegro as occupation force. And by the end of April the regiment transferred its III Group with 75/27 mod. 11 field guns to the 35th Artillery Regiment "Friuli", which in turn transferred its III Group with 75/13 mod. 15 mountain guns to the 41st Artillery Regiment "Firenze". On 31 August 1943 the regiment transferred its II Group with 75/27 mod. 11 field guns to the 53rd Artillery Regiment "Arezzo" of the 53rd Infantry Division "Arezzo" and in turn received that regiment's II Group with 75/13 mod. 15 mountain guns.

Following the announcement of the Armistice of Cassibile on 8 September 1943 the division and its regiments attempted to retreat from Macedonia to Albania and from there over the Adriatic Sea to Southern Italy. As the division found its path blocked by German forces the division joined the Albanian National Liberation Army on 28 September 1943. The regiment's 6th and 9th batteries with 75/13 mod. 15 mountain guns fought with the partisans against the Germans until the surviving personnel of the division was repatriated on 26 May 1945.

For its conduct in September 1943 and its service with the Yugoslav Partisans the regiment was awarded a Silver Medal of Military Valor, which was affixed to the regiment's flag and is depicted on the regiment's coat of arms.

=== Cold War ===
On 1 May 1947 the regiment was reformed in Florence as 41st Anti-tank Field Artillery Regiment and assigned to the Infantry Division "Legnano". The regiment consisted of a command, a command unit, the I and II groups with QF 17-pounder anti-tank guns, one of which was ceded by the 184th Field Artillery Regiment, and the III and IV groups with QF 6-pounder anti-tank guns. On 24 June of the same year the regiment moved from Florence to Bassano del Grappa. During the next years the III and IV groups were equipped with QF 17-pounder anti-tank guns.

On 1 January 1951 the Infantry Division "Folgore" included the following artillery regiments:

- Infantry Division "Folgore", in Treviso
  - 33rd Field Artillery Regiment, in Padua
  - 41st Anti-tank Field Artillery Regiment, in Bassano del Grappa
  - 184th Field Artillery Regiment, in Treviso
  - 5th Light Anti-aircraft Artillery Regiment, in Mestre

On 30 June 1951 the regiment ceded its III Group to the 184th Field Artillery Regiment and its IV Group to the 3rd Mountain Artillery Regiment. The next day, 1 July 1951, the regiment was renamed 41st Anti-tank Artillery Regiment and assigned to the V Territorial Military Command.

On 10 April 1952 the regiment was reorganized as 41st Heavy Field Artillery Regiment and consisted now of a command, a command unit, the I Group with 149/19 mod. 37 howitzers, and the II Group with BL 5.5-inch guns. On 1 November 1953 the regiment formed the III Group with 149/19 mod. 37 howitzers. On 10 June 1953 the regiment moved from Bassano del Grappa to Padua. In November 1957 the regiment's three groups were equipped with M114 155mm towed howitzers. On 7 March 1961 the I Group switched from M114 howitzers to M59 155mm field guns. On 1 October 1962 the V Heavy Mortar Group and VII Heavy Mortar Group joined the regiment. The two groups, which were support units of the V Army Corps and based in Rovigo, were equipped with Brandt AM-50 120 mm mortars. Already on 30 September 1963 the two groups were disbanded.

On 15 September 1974 the 6th Heavy Field Artillery Regiment was disbanded and that regiment's III Group, a reserve unit equipped with M114 155 mm towed howitzers, was assigned to the 41st Heavy Field Artillery Regiment and renumbered as IV Group. On 16 January 1975 the regiment's III Group with M59 155 mm field guns was placed in reserve status.

As part of the 1975 army reform the 41st Heavy Field Artillery Regiment was slated to be disbanded and consequently on 1 June 1975 the regiment's III and IV groups were disbanded, followed by the I and II groups on 31 March 1976. The next day the flag and traditions of the 41st Artillery Regiment "Firenze" were assigned to the 5th Artillery Specialists Group "Cordenons" in Cordenons. The group had been formed on 1 June 1956 in Conegliano as the V Army Corps Artillery Specialists Unit. The group was assigned throughout its existence to the V Army Corps and was renamed on 1 January 1958 as V Army Corps Artillery Specialists Group. As part of the 1975 army reform the group moved from Conegliano to Cordenons and was renamed on 1 January 1976 5th Artillery Specialists Group "Cordenons". After the group received the flag and traditions of the 41st Artillery Regiment "Firenze" it was renamed on 16 May 1976 41st Artillery Specialists Group "Cordenons". Finally, on 3 June 1976, the regimental command of the 41st Heavy Field Artillery Regiment was disbanded.

The group consisted of a command, a command and services battery, and three target acquisition batteries. On 12 November 1976 the President of the Italian Republic Giovanni Leone confirmed with decree 846 the assignation of the flag and traditions of the 41st Artillery Regiment "Firenze" to the group.

On 1 September 1977 the group was transferred from 5th Army Corps to the 3rd Missile Brigade "Aquileia". On 8 September of the same year the group placed two of its companies in reserve status and formed a Remote-controlled Aircraft Battery and on 28 November of the same year the group moved from Cordenons to Pordenone.

On 30 September 1986 the group left the 3rd Missile Brigade "Aquileia" and the next day the group was assigned to the 5th Army Corps' Artillery Command. In 1987 the group moved from Pordenone to Casarsa della Delizia.

=== Recent times ===
On 1 December 1991 the 41st Artillery Specialists Group "Cordenons" was assigned to the 5th Heavy Field Artillery Regiment. On 31 March 1993 the 5th Heavy Field Artillery Regiment was disbanded and the group became once more an autonomous unit. On 31 July 1993 the group received the Remote-controlled Aircraft Battery of the 13th Target Acquisition Group "Aquileia". In 1996 the group was assigned to the Informations and Electronic Defense Center, which over the years evolved to become the Tactical Intelligence Brigade.

In 1999 the group was reorganized as 41st Surveillance and Target Acquisition Group and equipped with counter-battery radars. On 18 September 2001 the group lost its autonomy and the next day entered the 41st Field Artillery Regiment "Cordenons". Between 2003 and 2007 the regiment moved its batteries from Casarsa della Delizia to Sora. On 1 June 2004, the regiment was renamed 41st IMINT Regiment "Cordenons" and reorganized as a battlefield surveillance unit with multi-sensor batteries.

== Organization ==
As of 2023 the 41st IMINT Regiment "Cordenons" is organized as follows:

- 41st IMINT Regiment "Cordenons", in Sora
  - Command and Logistic Support Battery
  - Group Command
    - 1st Battery
    - 2nd Battery
    - 3rd Battery

The regiment is equipped with RQ-7 Shadow 200, RQ-11B Raven and Bramor C4EYE unmanned aerial vehicles, IA-3 Colibrì unmanned quadcopters, Thales SQUIRE ground surveillance radars.
