= Mechanized Division "Folgore" =

Divisione Meccanizzata "Folgore"
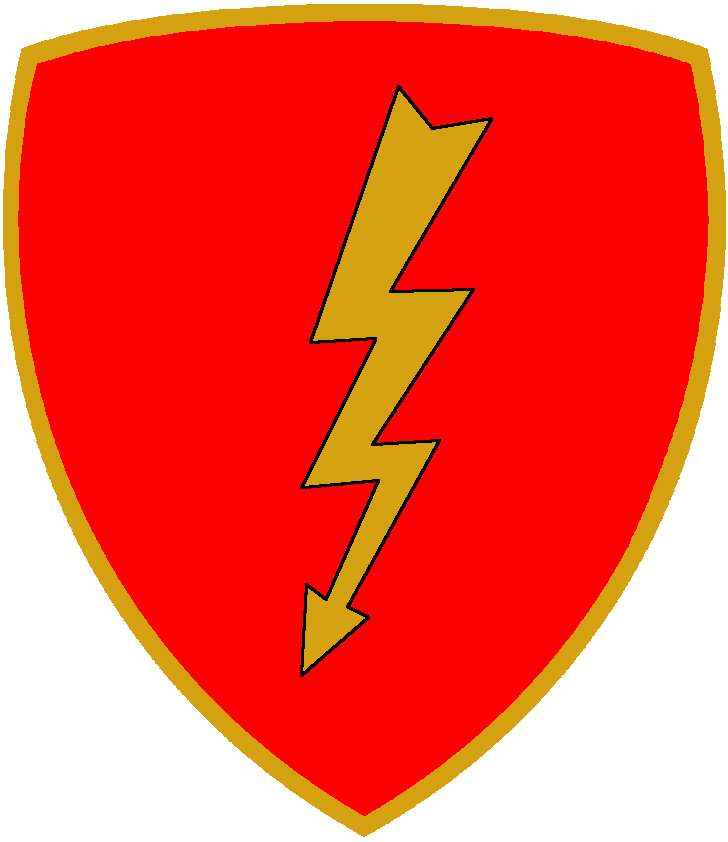
- Coat of Arms of the Mechanized Division "Folgore"
- Active: 25 September 1944 - 31 October 1986
- Country: Italy
- Branch: Italian Army
- Role: Armored warfare
- Part of: V Army Corps
- Garrison/HQ: Treviso
- Engagements: World War II

The Mechanized Division "Folgore" was a mechanized division of the Italian Army. Its core units were three mechanized brigades. The brigades headquarters was in the city of Treviso.

== History ==
=== World War II ===
The division's history begins on 25 September 1944 with the formation of the Combat Group "Folgore" of the Italian Co-Belligerent Army with soldiers from the disbanded 184th Infantry Division "Nembo". The name of the combat group was chosen to commemorate the 185th Infantry Division "Folgore", which fought to annihilation in the Second Battle of El Alamein. The "Nembo" itself had been raised in 1942 with the Folgore's 185th Infantry Regiment "Folgore" as its core unit.

The Combat Group "Folgore" consisted of the army's Paratroopers Regiment "Nembo", the navy's Marine Regiment "San Marco", the Paratroopers Artillery Regiment "Folgore" and the CLXXXIV Mixed Engineer Battalion. Both regiments consisted of three infantry battalions, a mortar company armed with British ML 3 inch mortars and an anti-tank company armed with British QF 6 pounder guns. The artillery regiment consisted of four artillery groups with British QF 25 pounder guns, one anti-tank group with British QF 17 pounder guns, and one anti-air group armed with British versions of the Bofors 40 mm gun. Dressed in British uniforms the combat group took part in the Italian Campaign of World War II as part of the British XIII Corps.

During the war the fascist regime in Northern Italy fielded the 1st Paratroopers Arditi Regiment "Folgore", which also fielded a "Nembo" and a "Folgore" battalion.

=== Cold War ===
At the end of World War II the combat group was based in Florence. When the "San Marco" regiment returned to the navy on 5 September 1945 the combat group received the Infantry Regiment "Garibaldi" as replacement. The "Garibaldi" regiment had been formed on 25 April 1945 in Viterbo with repatriated veterans of the Partisan Division "Garibaldi", which had fought alongside Yugoslav Partisans on the Yugoslav Front after the Armistice of Cassibile between Italy and the Western Allies. The "Garibaldi" division had been formed when the 19th Infantry Division "Venezia" on garrison duty in Montenegro refused to surrender or ally with the Germans. The "Venezia", together with men of the 1st Alpine Division "Taurinense", who had refused to surrender too (mainly troops from the Alpini Battalion "Ivrea" and the Mountain Artillery Group "Aosta"), saw heavy combat in Montenegro and out of its 16,000 men only 3,800 made it back to Italy. From these veterans the "Garibaldi" regiment was raised with the battalions "Aosta", "Venezia" and "Torino".

On 15 October 1945 the Combat Group "Folgore" was elevated to division and began to move to the Northern Italian city of Treviso. As the "Folgore" along with the Infantry Division "Mantova" formed the first line of defence towards Yugoslavia the division was augmented with the 5th Lancers Reconnaissance Group, the 33rd Field Artillery Regiment, the 41st Anti-tank Field Artillery Regiment, and the 5th Light Anti-aircraft Artillery Regiment. On 1 November 1948 the Infantry Regiment "Garibaldi" was renamed 182nd Infantry Regiment "Garibaldi", the Paratroopers Infantry Regiment "Nembo" was renamed 183rd Infantry Regiment "Nembo", and the Paratroopers Artillery Regiment "Folgore" was renamed 184th Field Artillery Regiment.

In 1949 the division was motorized and the 5th Lancers Reconnaissance Group was expanded to regiment and equipped with tanks, changing its name to 5th Armored Cavalry Regiment "Lancieri di Novara". In 1951 the division lost the 41st Anti-tank Field Artillery Regiment and the 5th Light Anti-aircraft Artillery Regiment. On 1 July 1953 the 184th Field Artillery Regiment was reformed as 5th Mountain Artillery Regiment, which left the division and joined the Alpine Brigade "Orobica".

On 15 September 1955 the division received the 82nd Infantry Regiment "Torino" from the Infantry Division "Trieste". As the division fielded now three regiments with three motorized infantry battalions each the army decided to reorganize the "Garibaldi" regiment into an armored regiment. On 1 November 1958 the "Garibaldi" finished its reorganization and became the 182nd Armored Infantry Regiment "Garibaldi" with a M47 Patton tank battalion and a mechanized Bersaglieri battalion. In anticipation of the transformation of the "Garibaldi" regiment the 5th Armored Cavalry Regiment "Lancieri di Novara" left the division on 1 April 1957 and was used to raise the Cavalry Brigade "Pozzuolo del Friuli".

On 1 January 1963 the army raised the Paratroopers Brigade "Folgore" in Pisa and both units were allowed to keep the name and traditions of the Italian airborne divisions of World War II. In 1963 the "Folgore" division received the 53rd Infantry Fortification Regiment "Umbria", and in 1964 the XII Squadrons Group "Cavalleggeri di Saluzzo". By 1974 the division was organized as follows:

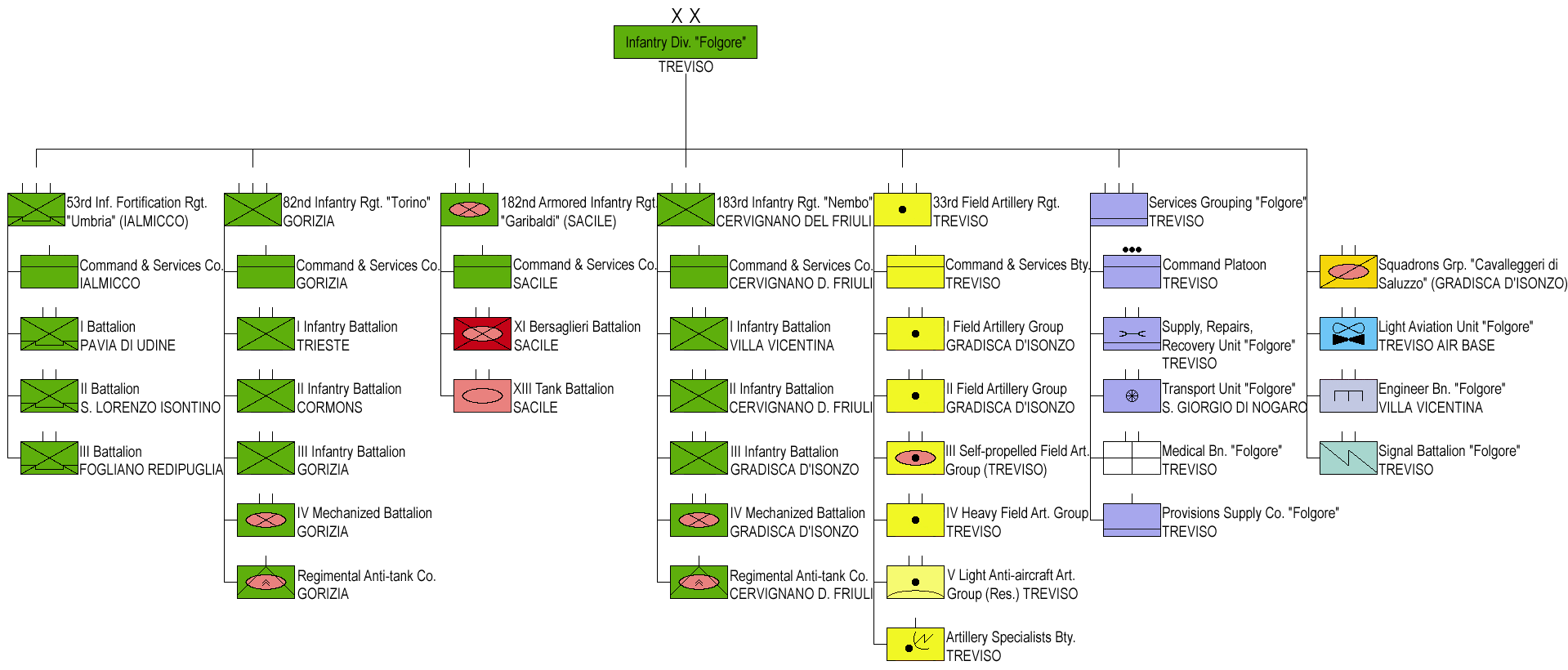
Infantry Division "Folgore" in 1974

- Infantry Division "Folgore", in Treviso
  - 53rd Fortification Infantry Regiment "Umbria", in Ialmicco
    - Command and Services Company, in Ialmicco
    - I Battalion, in Pavia di Udine / Brazzano
    - II Battalion, in San Lorenzo Isontino / Farra d'Isonzo / Lucinico
    - III Battalion, in Fogliano Redipuglia / Perteole
  - 82nd Infantry Regiment "Torino", in Gorizia
    - Command and Services Company, in Gorizia
    - I Infantry Battalion, in Trieste
    - II Infantry Battalion, in Cormons
    - III Infantry Battalion, in Gorizia
    - IV Mechanized Battalion, in Gorizia (M113 armored personnel carriers and M47 tanks)
    - Regimental Anti-tank Company, in Gorizia (anti-tank guided missiles and M47 tanks)
  - 182nd Armored Infantry Regiment "Garibaldi", in Sacile
    - Command and Services Company, in Sacile (includes an anti-tank guided missile platoon)
    - XI Bersaglieri Battalion, in Sacile (M113 armored personnel carriers)
    - XIII Tank Battalion, in Sacile (M47 Patton tanks)
  - 183rd Infantry Regiment "Nembo", in Cervignano del Friuli
    - Command and Services Company, in Cervignano del Friuli
    - I Infantry Battalion, in Villa Vicentina
    - II Infantry Battalion, in Cervignano del Friuli
    - III Infantry Battalion, in Gradisca d'Isonzo
    - IV Mechanized Battalion, in Gradisca d'Isonzo (M113 armored personnel carriers and M47 tanks)
    - Regimental Anti-tank Company, in Cervignano del Friuli (anti-tank guided missiles and M47 tanks)
  - 33rd Field Artillery Regiment, in Treviso
    - Command and Services Battery, in Treviso
    - I Field Artillery Group, in Gradisca d'Isonzo (M14/61 105 mm towed howitzers)
    - II Field Artillery Group, in Gradisca d'Isonzo (M14/61 105mm towed howitzers)
    - III Self-propelled Field Artillery Group, in Treviso (M7 105 mm self-propelled howitzers)
    - IV Heavy Field Artillery Group, in Treviso (M114 155 mm towed howitzers)
    - V Light Anti-aircraft Artillery Group (Reserve), in Treviso (Bofors 40 mm anti-aircraft guns and 12.7mm anti-aircraft machine guns)
    - Artillery Specialists Battery, in Treviso
  - "Cavalleggeri di Saluzzo" Squadrons Group, in Gradisca d'Isonzo (Fiat Campagnola reconnaissance vehicles and M47 Patton tanks)
  - Light Aviation Unit "Folgore", at Treviso Air Base (L-19E Bird Dog light aircraft and AB 206 reconnaissance helicopters)
  - Engineer Battalion "Folgore", in Villa Vicentina
  - Signal Battalion "Folgore", in Treviso
  - Services Grouping "Folgore", in Treviso
    - Command Platoon, in Treviso
    - Supply, Repairs, Recovery Unit "Folgore", in Treviso
    - Transport Unit "Folgore", in San Giorgio di Nogaro
    - Medical Battalion "Folgore", in Treviso
    - Provisions Supply Company "Folgore", in Treviso

==== 1975 reform ====
The Italian Army undertook a major reform in 1975: the regimental level was abolished and battalions came under direct command of multi-arms brigades. As tensions with Yugoslavia over the city of Trieste were allayed by the Treaty of Osimo and because a reduction of the military service from 15 to 12 months for the army and air force and from 24 to 18 months for the navy, forced the army to reduce its forces by nearly 45,000 troops, it was decided that the units of the Infantry Division "Folgore" would contract to a brigade. Therefore, during 1975 most units of the "Folgore" division were either disbanded or reorganized and on 23 October 1975 the remaining units of the division were used to raise the Mechanized Brigade "Gorizia" in Gorizia. To bring the division back to full strength it received the Mechanized Brigade "Trieste" in Bologna and the Armored Brigade "Vittorio Veneto" in Villa Opicina. By the end of the year the division consisted of the following units.

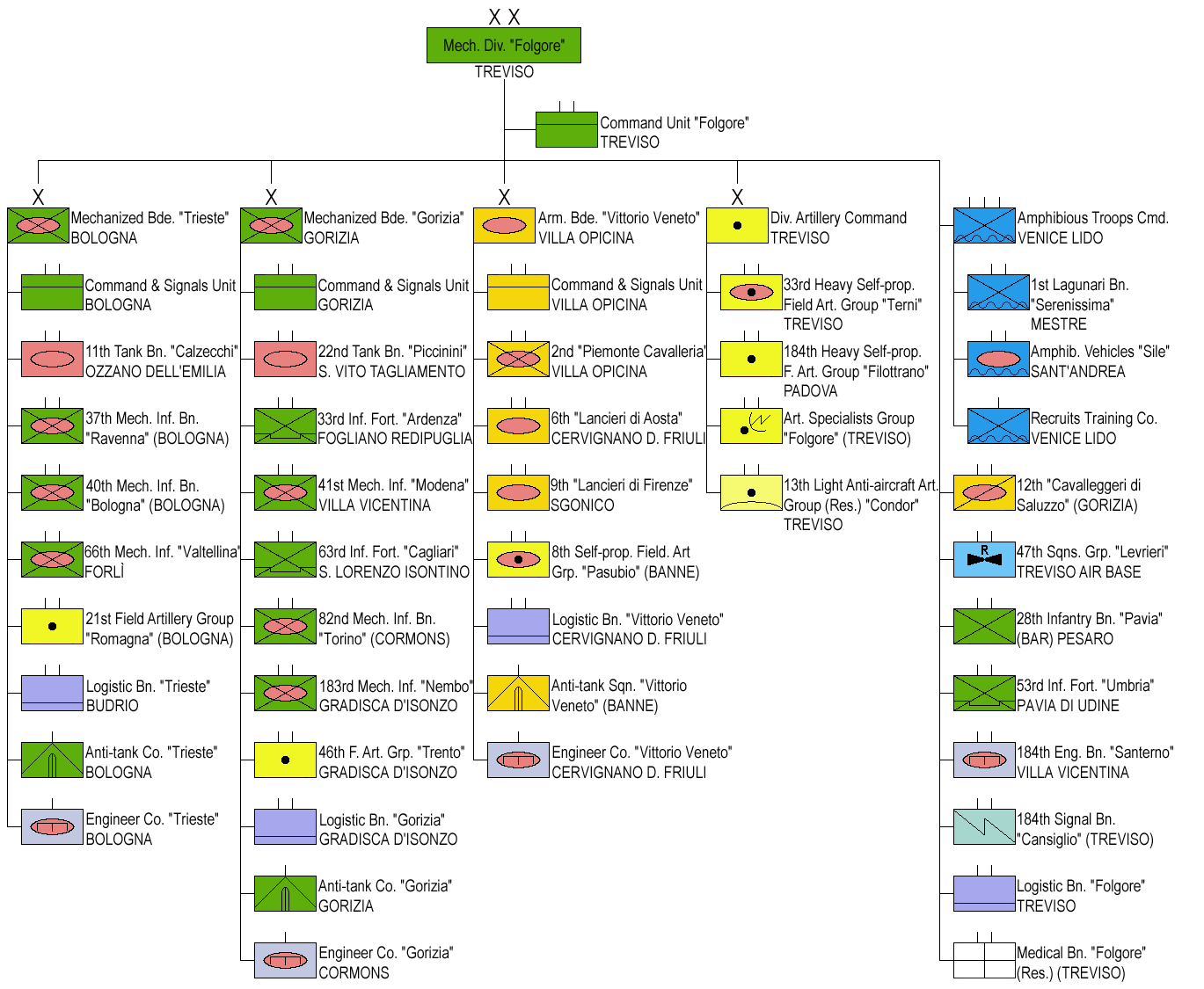
Mechanized Division "Folgore" in 1977

- Mechanized Division "Folgore", in Treviso
  - Command Unit "Folgore", in Treviso
  - Mechanized Brigade "Gorizia", in Gorizia
  - Mechanized Brigade "Trieste", in Bologna
  - Armored Brigade "Vittorio Veneto", in Villa Opicina
  - Amphibious Troops Command, in Lido di Venezia
  - Divisional Artillery Command, in Treviso
    - 33rd Heavy Self-propelled Field Artillery Group "Terni", in Treviso (M109G 155 mm self-propelled howitzers)
    - 184th Heavy Self-propelled Field Artillery Group "Filottrano", in Padua (M114 155 mm towed howitzers, the planned transition to M109G 155 mm self-propelled howitzers was canceled)
    - Artillery Specialists Group "Folgore", in Treviso
    - 13th Light Anti-aircraft Artillery Group "Condor" (Reserve), in Treviso
  - 12th Squadrons Group "Cavalleggeri di Saluzzo", in Gorizia (M47 Patton tanks, M113 armored personnel carriers and AR59 Campagnola reconnaissance vehicles)
  - 28th Infantry Battalion "Pavia" (Recruits Training), in Pesaro
  - 53rd Infantry Fortification Battalion "Umbria", in Pavia di Udine (13x companies)
  - 184th Engineer Battalion "Santerno", in Villa Vicentina
  - 184th Signal Battalion "Cansiglio", in Treviso
  - Logistic Battalion "Folgore", in Treviso
  - 47th Reconnaissance Helicopters Squadrons Group "Levrieri", at Treviso Air Base
    - Command and Services Squadron
    - 471st Reconnaissance Helicopters Squadron (AB 206 reconnaissance helicopters)
    - 472nd Reconnaissance Helicopters Squadron, detached to Trieste-Prosecco Heliport (AB 206 reconnaissance helicopters)
  - Medical Battalion "Folgore" (Reserve), in Treviso

The division was disbanded on 31 October 1986 and its units came under direct command of the 5th Army Corps.

== Today ==
The traditions of both "Folgore" divisions are today carried on by the Paratroopers Brigade "Folgore", while the name of the "Garibaldi" division and regiment live on in the Bersaglieri Brigade "Garibaldi".
