= Filottrano =

- Comune
- Comune di Filottrano
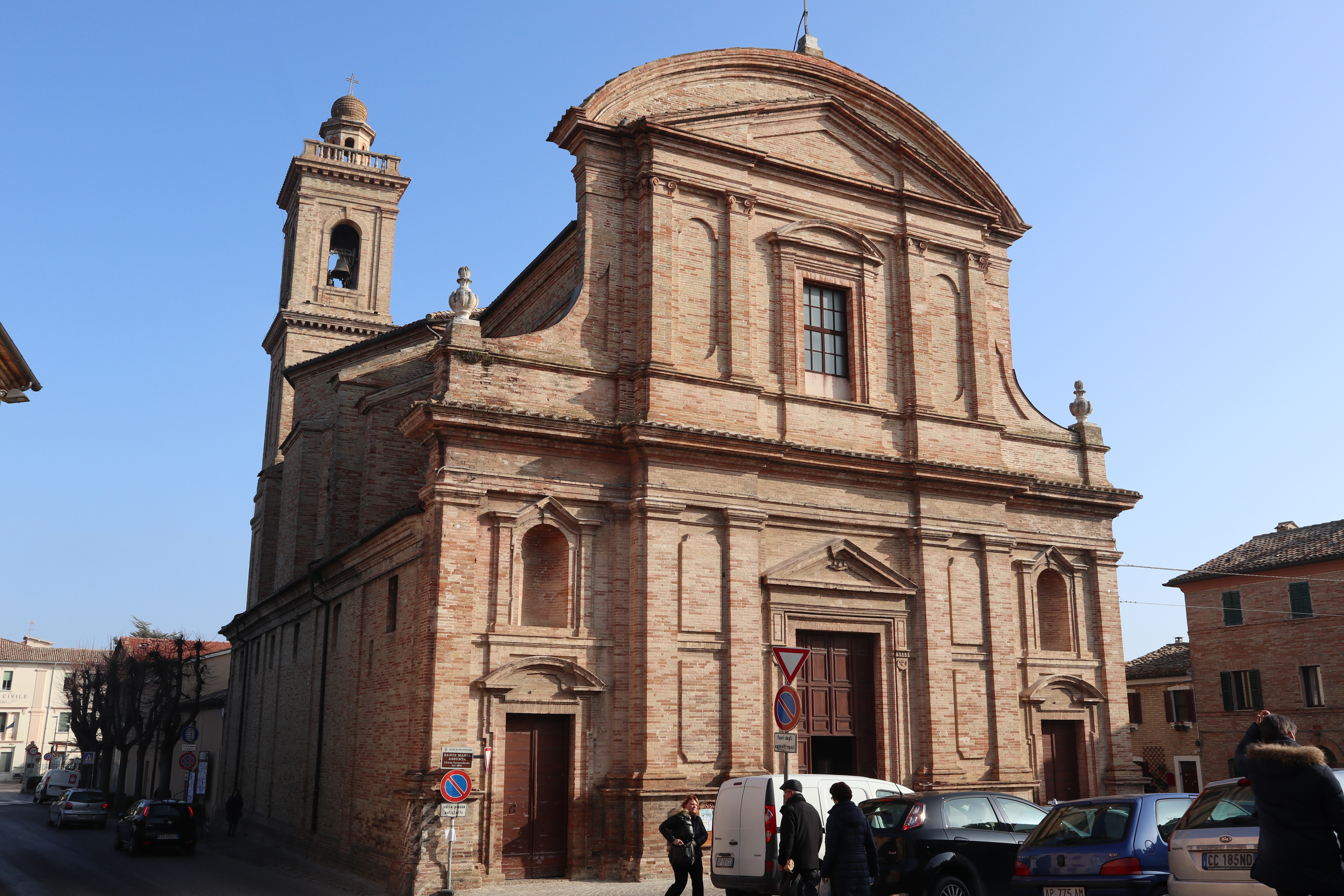

- Location within Italy Location within Marche
- Coordinates: 43°26′N 13°21′E
- Country: Italy
- Region: Marche
- Province: Ancona (AN)
- Frazioni: Montoro, Tornazzano, S. Biagio, S. Ignazio, Montepulciano, Bartoluccio

Government
  - Mayor: Luca Paolorossi

Area
  - Total: 70.2 km^{2} (27.1 sq mi)
- Elevation: 270 m (890 ft)

Population (31 December 2017)
  - Total: 9,332
  - Density: 133/km^{2} (344/sq mi)
- Demonym: Filottranesi
- Time zone: UTC+1 (CET)
  - Summer (DST): UTC+2 (CEST)
- Postal code: 60024
- Dialing code: 071
- Website: Official website

Filottrano is a comune (municipality) in the Province of Ancona in the Italian region Marche, located about 25 kilometres (16 mi) southwest of Ancona.

Filottrano borders the following municipalities: Appignano, Cingoli, Jesi, Montefano, Osimo, Santa Maria Nuova.

Lardini, the international fashion company, is based in Filottrano.
