= Battle of Ancona =

1944 battle of World War II

- Part of the Italian campaign of World War II
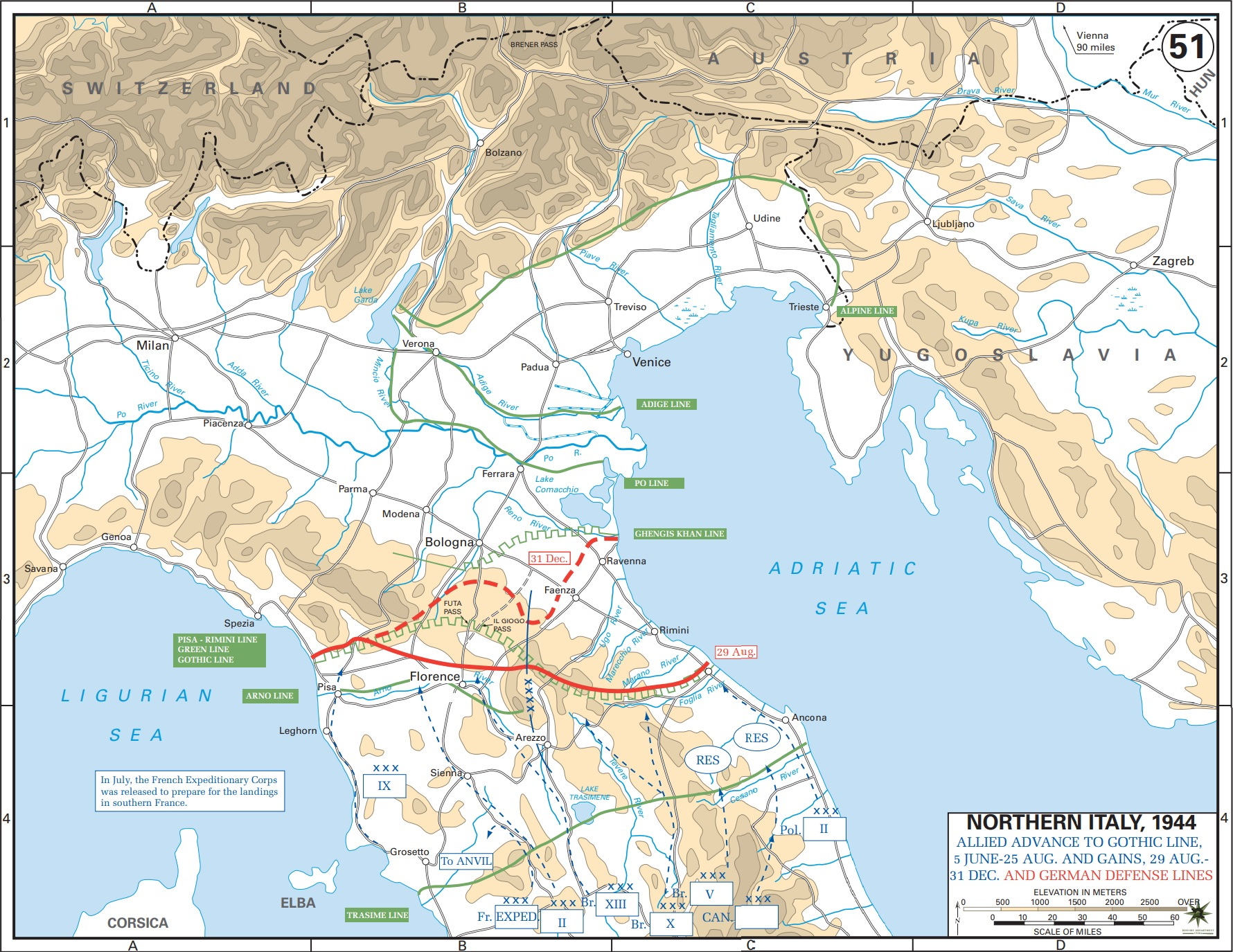
- German defensive positions in Northern Italy 1944. Polish II Corps advance and taking on Ancona showed on the map.
Date	16 June–18 July 1944
Location	Ancona, Italy 43°36′43″N 13°30′52″E
Result	Allied victory

Belligerents
Poland; United Kingdom; Italy; Italian Resistance	Germany

Commanders and leaders
Władysław Anders; Klemens Rudnicki	(Nazi Germany) Harry Hoppe

Strength
~50,000	Unknown

Casualties and losses
496 killed 1,789 wounded 139 missing	800 killed 2,500 captured

The Battle of Ancona was fought between forces from Poland serving as part of the British Army and German forces that took place from 16 June–18 July 1944 during the Italian campaign in World War II. The battle was the result of an Allied plan to capture the city of Ancona in Italy in order to gain possession of a seaport closer to the fighting so that they could shorten their lines of communication. The Polish 2nd Corps, tasked with capture of the city on 16 June 1944, accomplished the objective a month later on 18 July 1944.

== Background ==
The Allied advance north meant that the logistics line was in need of a port closer to the front lines than the ports of Pescara and Anzio. As such, two new targets were designated: Ancona on the Adriatic coast, and Livorno on the Tyrrhenian Sea. On 16 June, Polish II Corps under Lieutenant-General Władysław Anders—which had been taken into British Eighth Army, commanded by Lieutenant-General Sir Oliver Leese, reserve after its efforts in the Battle of Monte Cassino—was brought forward once more to relieve British V Corps and tasked with the capture of Ancona. On 17 June, Anders was given command of the Adriatic sector of the Italian theatre.

== Battle ==
Battle of Ancona (17–18 July 1944)

The first obstacle to cross was the Chienti river. Polish troops reached it on 21 June, and heavy fighting lasted in that region until 30 June. The main offensive on Ancona began on 17 July. Polish armored troops took Monte della Crescia and outflanked German troops defending Ancona. Next, the Italian Co-belligerent Army's IX Assault Unit secured Casenuove, and neighbouring British and Canadian troops took Montecchio and Croce di San Vincenzo. By the evening of 17 July, Polish troops were near Agugliano, and the following morning they took Offagna. Later that day, Polish troops took Chiaravalle, and armored troops reached the sea, cutting the German defenders of Ancona from the north-west. The Germans were falling back towards the sea, and Polish troops encountered little resistance entering Ancona at 14:30 on 18 July.

== Aftermath ==
Taking Ancona was the only independent operation of the Polish II Corps. Afterward, the Corps took part in the breaking of the Gothic Line and the Allied spring 1945 offensive which resulted in the surrender of the Axis forces in Italy.

For their action in the battle while seconded to the Polish corps, the British 7th Queen's Own Hussars received the battle honour "Ancona".
