= Second Battle of El Alamein order of battle =

Order of battle for 1942 battle in Egypt

Dispositions for the Second Battle of El Alamein
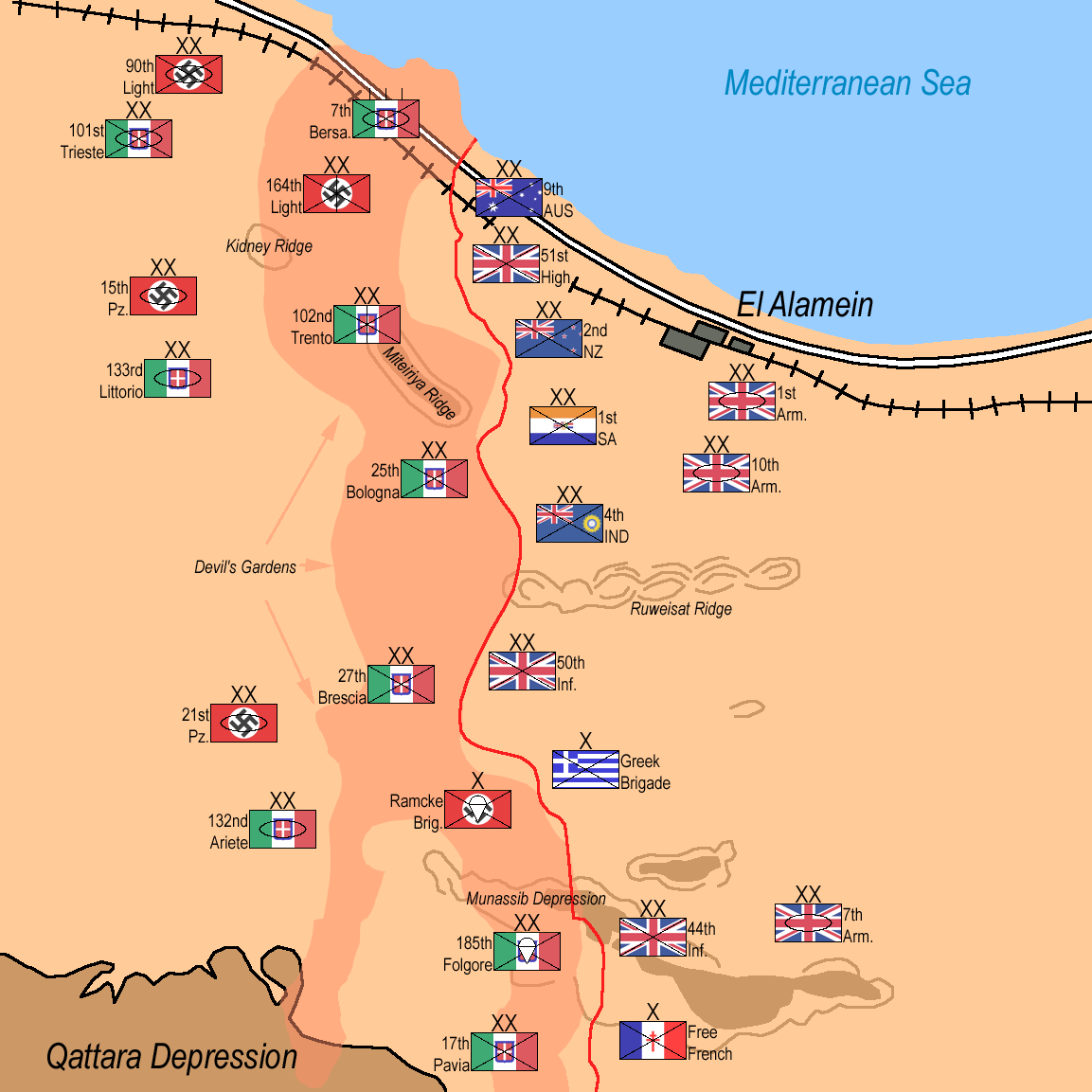

The Second Battle of El Alamein (23 October – 11 November 1942) was a battle of the Second World War that took place near the Egyptian railway halt of El Alamein. The First Battle of El Alamein and the Battle of Alam el Halfa had prevented the Axis from advancing further into Egypt.

The Allied victory was the beginning of the end of the Western Desert Campaign, eliminating the Axis threat to Egypt, the Suez Canal and the Middle Eastern and Persian oil fields. The battle revived the morale of the Allies, being the first big success against the Axis since Operation Crusader in late 1941. The end of the battle coincided with the Allied invasion of French North Africa in Operation Torch on 8 November, which opened a second front in North Africa.

== High-level orders of battle ==
=== Allies ===
Middle East Command: Lieutenant-General Harold Alexander

British Eighth Army
Lieutenant-General Sir Bernard Law Montgomery

Northern sector

British XXX Corps (Lieutenant-General Oliver Leese)

Australian 9th Division (Major-General Leslie Morshead)
British 51st (Highland) Infantry Division (Major-General Douglas Wimberley)
New Zealand 2nd Division (Lieutenant-General Bernard Freyberg)
South African 1st Infantry Division (Major-General Dan Pienaar)
Indian 4th Infantry Division (Major-General Francis Tuker)

Southern sector

British XIII Corps (Lieutenant-General Brian Horrocks)

British 50th (Northumbrian) Infantry Division (Major-General John Nichols)
British 44th (Home Counties) Infantry Division (Major-General Ivor Hughes)
British 7th Armoured Division (Major-General John Harding)

Reserve

British X Corps (Lieutenant-General Herbert Lumsden)

British 1st Armoured Division (Major-General Raymond Briggs)
British 10th Armoured Division (Major-General Alexander Gatehouse)
British 8th Armoured Division (Major-General Charles Henry Gairdner)

=== Axis ===
Delegazione Africa Settentrionale (Delease): Generale di Corpo D' Armata Curio Barbasetti

Panzerarmee Afrika
Generalfeldmarschall Erwin Rommel

Deutsches Afrika Korps
Generalleutnant Wilhelm Ritter von Thoma

90th Light Afrika Division (Generalmajor Theodor Graf von Sponeck)
15th Panzer Division (Generalmajor Gustav von Vaerst)
21st Panzer Division (Generalmajor Heinz von Randow)

Italian XXI Army Corps
Generale di Corpo d'Armata Enea Navarini; Generale di Divisione Alessandro Gloria (Note: in temporary command until October 26)

102nd Motorised Division "Trento" (Generale di Brigata Giorgio Masina)
25th Infantry Division "Bologna" (Generale di Divisione Alessandro Gloria)

Italian XX Army Corps
Generale di Divisione Giuseppe De Stefanis

101st Motorised Division "Trieste" (Generale di Divisione Francesco La Ferla)
164th Light Africa Division (Generalleutnant Carl-Hans Lungershausen)
133rd Armoured Division "Littorio" (Generale di Divisione Gervasio Bitossi)
132nd Armoured Division "Ariete" (Generale di Divisione Francesco Antonio Arena)

Italian X Army Corps
Generale di Divisione Federico Ferrari Orsi KIA 18 Oct
Generale di Divisione Enrico Frattini thru 26 Oct
Generale di Divisione Edoardo Nebbia from 27 Oct, POW 7 Nov

27th Infantry Division "Brescia" (Generale di Divisione Brunetto Brunetti)
Ramcke Parachute Brigade (Generalmajor Hermann-Bernhard Ramcke)
185th Infantry Division "Folgore" (Generale di Divisione Enrico Frattini)
17th Infantry Division "Pavia" (Generale di Divisione Nazzareno Scattaglia)

Reserve

16th Motorised Division "Pistoia" (Generale di Divisione Giuseppe Falugi)
136th Armoured Division "Giovani Fascisti" (Generale di Divisione Ismaele Di Nisio)

== Allies ==
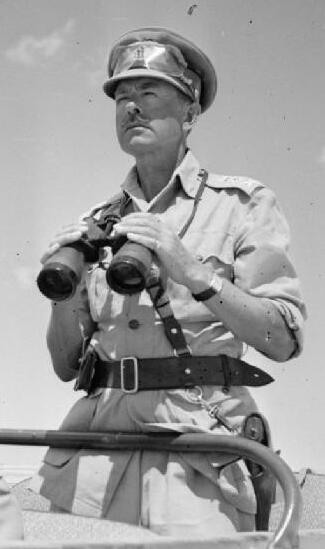
Lieutenant-General Harold Alexander

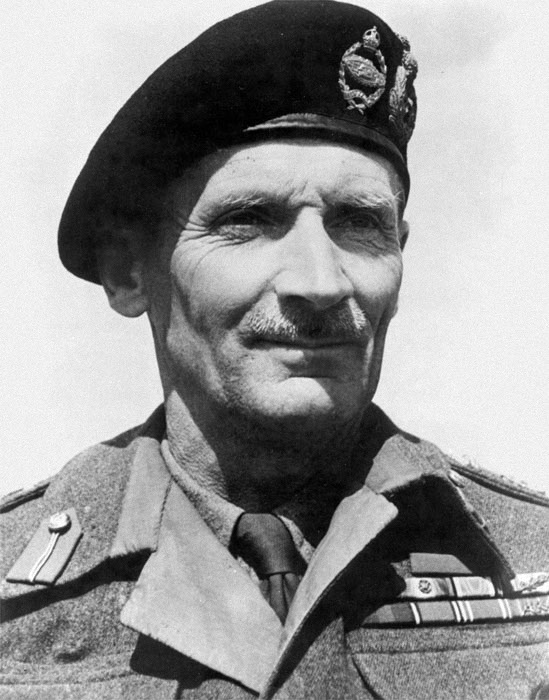
Lt.-Gen. Bernard Law Montgomery

L Middle East Command

Lieutenant-General Harold Alexander

British Eighth Army Lieutenant-General Sir Bernard Law Montgomery

Under direct Army command

1st Army Tank Brigade (Note: Equipped with minesweeping Matilda tanks, allotted to XXX Corps for minefield clearance) (Brigadier Thomas Price)

42nd Royal Tank Regiment
44th Royal Tank Regiment

1st Armoured Brigade (reforming) (Brigadier G.N. Todd)

4th Hussars (elements)
8th (King's Royal Irish) Hussars (elements)
2nd Royal Gloucestershire Hussars

12th Anti-Aircraft Brigade (Brigadier Percy Calvert-Jones)

14th (West Lothian, Royal Scots) Light Anti-Aircraft Regiment, Royal Artillery
16th Light Anti-Aircraft Regiment, Royal Artillery
27th Light Anti-Aircraft Regiment, Royal Artillery
88th Heavy Anti-Aircraft Regiment, Royal Artillery
94th Heavy Anti-Aircraft Regiment, Royal Artillery
27th (London Electrical Engineers) Searchlight Regiment, Royal Artillery (two troops)

2nd Anti-Aircraft Brigade (Note: For HQ and railway protection) (Brigadier Murray McIntyre)

2nd Light Anti-Aircraft Regiment, Royal Artillery
69th (Royal Warwickshire Regiment) Heavy Anti-Aircraft Regiment, Royal Artillery (199th and 261st batteries)

21st Indian Infantry Brigade (reforming) (Note: Used for HQ protection, camouflage and guard duties) (Brigadier J.J. Purves)

1st Battalion, 6th Rajputana Rifles
3rd Battalion, 7th Rajput Regiment
2nd Battalion, 8th Gurkha Rifles
9th Indian Field Company, Corps of Signals

Army troops

B Squadron, 6th Royal Tank Regiment
6th South African Armoured Car Regiment (one troop)
566th Army Troops Company, Royal Engineers
588th Army Troops Company, Royal Engineers
25th Field Company, South African Engineers
27th Field Company, South African Engineers
31st Field Company, South African Engineers
8th Army Signals, Royal Corps of Signals

=== British XXX Corps ===
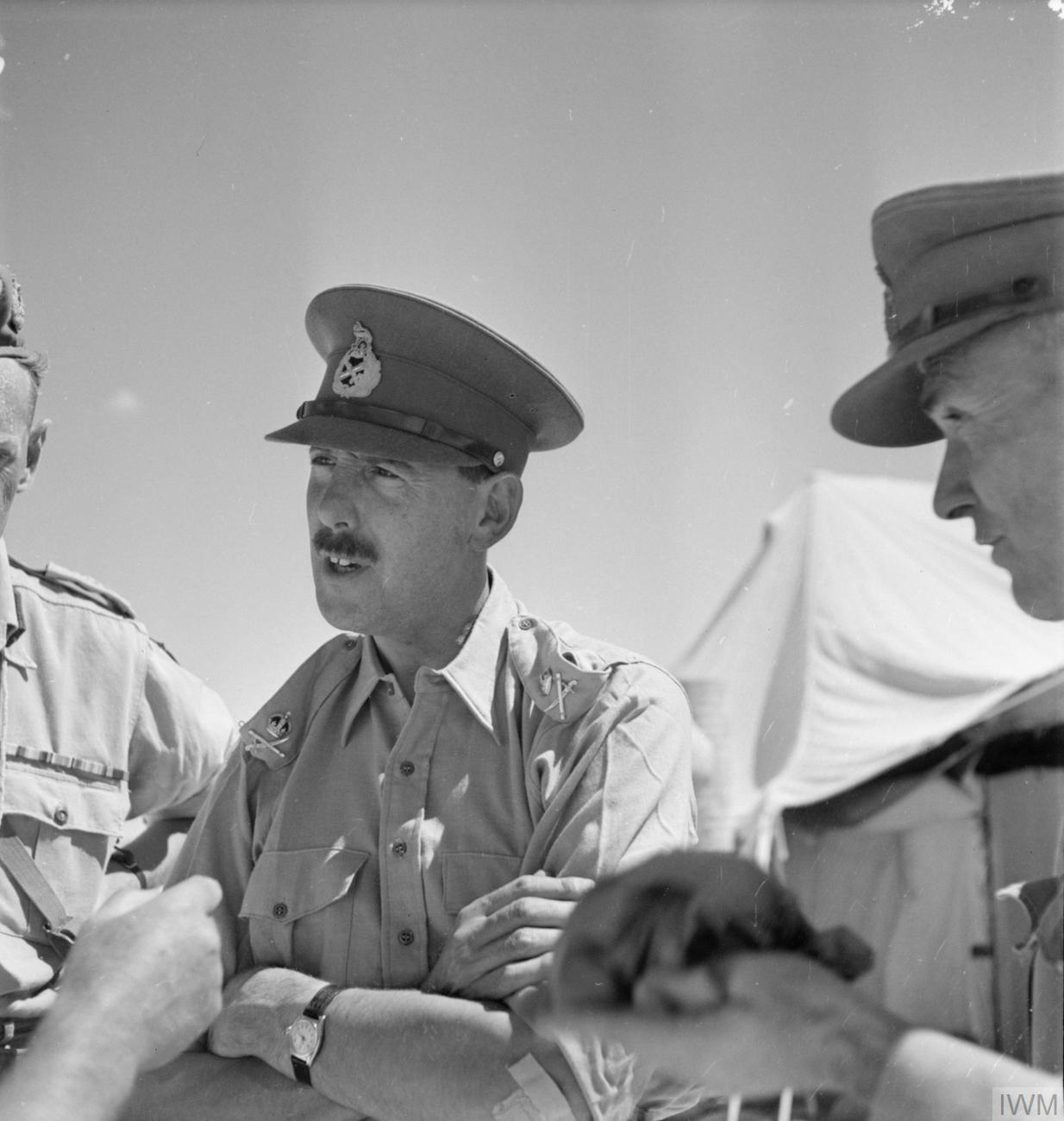
Lt.-Gen. Oliver Leese

XXX Corps occupied the northern sector of the Allied front.

Lieutenant-General Oliver Leese

Under direct Corps command

XXX Corps Defence Squadron
C Squadron, 4th/6th South African Armoured Car Regiment
7th Medium Regiment, Royal Artillery
64th Medium Regiment, Royal Artillery
69th (Caernarvon & Denbigh Yeomanry) Medium Regiment, Royal Artillery
66th Mortar Company, Royal Engineers (two sections detached to 9th Australian Division)
11th Field Company, South African Engineers
13th Field Company, South African Engineers
22nd Field Park Company, South African Engineers
XXX Corps Signals, Royal Corps of Signals

Divisions deployed north to south

Australian 9th Division
Major-General Leslie Morshead

Division-level units

9th Division Cavalry Regiment
2/2nd Machine Gun Battalion
2/3rd Pioneer Battalion
2/7th Field Regiment, Royal Australian Artillery
2/8th Field Regiment, Royal Australian Artillery
2/12th Field Regiment, Royal Australian Artillery
3rd Anti-Tank Regiment, Royal Australian Artillery
4th Light Anti-Aircraft Regiment, Royal Australian Artillery
2/3rd Field Company, Royal Australian Engineers
2/7th Field Company, Royal Australian Engineers
2/13th Field Company, Royal Australian Engineers
2/4th Field Park Company, Royal Australian Engineers
9th Australian Division Signals

Australian 24th Brigade (Brigadier Arthur H.L. Godfrey)

2/28th Australian Infantry Battalion, Western Australia
2/32nd Australian Infantry Battalion, Victoria
2/43rd Australian Infantry Battalion, South Australia

Australian 26th Brigade (Brigadier David A. Whitehead)

2/23rd Australian Infantry Battalion, Victoria
2/24th Australian Infantry Battalion, Victoria
2/48th Australian Infantry Battalion, SA

Australian 20th Brigade (Brigadier Hugh Wrigley)

2/13th Australian Infantry Battalion, New South Wales
2/15th Australian Infantry Battalion, Queensland
2/17th Australian Infantry Battalion, New South Wales

British 51st (Highland) Infantry Division
Major-General Douglas Wimberley

Division-level units

51st Battalion, Reconnaissance Regiment
1/7th Battalion, Middlesex Regiment (machine gun battalion)
50th Royal Tank Regiment (attached from 23rd Armoured Brigade)
126th (Highland) Field Regiment, Royal Artillery
127th (Highland) Field Regiment, Royal Artillery
128th (Highland) Field Regiment, Royal Artillery
61st (West Highland) Anti-Tank Regiment, Royal Artillery
40th Light Anti-Aircraft Regiment, Royal Artillery
51st (Highland) Divisional Engineers

274th Field Company, Royal Engineers
275th Field Company, Royal Engineers
276th Field Company, Royal Engineers
239th Field Park Company, Royal Engineers

51st Highland Division Signals, Royal Corps of Signals

British 152nd Infantry Brigade (Brigadier George Murray)

2nd Battalion, Seaforth Highlanders
5th Battalion, Seaforth Highlanders
5th Battalion, Queen's Own Cameron Highlanders

British 153rd Infantry Brigade (Brigadier Douglas Graham)

5th Battalion, Black Watch
1st Battalion, Gordon Highlanders
5th/7th Battalion, Gordon Highlanders

British 154th Infantry Brigade (Brigadier Henry W. Houldsworth)

1st Battalion, Black Watch
7th Battalion, Black Watch
7th Battalion, Argyll and Sutherland Highlanders

New Zealand 2nd Division
Lieutenant-General Bernard Freyberg

Division-level units

2nd New Zealand Division Cavalry Regiment
27th (Machine Gun) Battalion
4th Field Regiment, New Zealand Artillery
5th Field Regiment, New Zealand Artillery
6th Field Regiment, New Zealand Artillery
7th Anti-Tank Regiment, New Zealand Artillery
14th Light Anti-Aircraft Regiment, New Zealand Artillery
6th Field Company, New Zealand Engineers
7th Field Company, New Zealand Engineers
8th Field Company, New Zealand Engineers
5th Field Park Company, New Zealand Engineers
New Zealand 2nd Division Signals

New Zealand 5th Infantry Brigade (Brigadier Howard Kippenberger)

21st Battalion, New Zealand Infantry
22nd Battalion, New Zealand Infantry
23rd Battalion, New Zealand Infantry
28th (Maori) Battalion, New Zealand Infantry

New Zealand 6th Infantry Brigade (Brigadier William Gentry)

24th Battalion, New Zealand Infantry
25th Battalion, New Zealand Infantry
26th Battalion, New Zealand Infantry

British 9th Armoured Brigade (Note: 35 Sherman, 37 Grant, 46 Crusader = 118 tanks) (Brigadier John Currie)

3rd (The King's Own) Hussars
Royal Wiltshire Yeomanry
Warwickshire Yeomanry
14th Battalion, Sherwood Foresters

South African 1st Infantry Division
Major-General Dan Pienaar

Division-level units

8th Royal Tank Regiment (Note: Attached from 23rd Armoured Brigade, in reserve until 31 October; 1 SA Division had a Reserve Group comprising 8 RTR, 3 SA Armoured Car Regt. less two squadrons, 2 Regt. Botha (from 1 SA Infantry Brigade), a battery of anti-tank guns and a troop each of light anti-aircraft guns and Scorpion anti-mine flail tanks. The group was disbanded on 31 October.)
South African 3rd Armoured Car Reconnaissance Regiment
Regiment President Steyn (machine gun battalion)
2nd Regiment Botha (in reserve until 31 October)
1st Field Regiment, Cape Field Artillery, South African Artillery
4th Field Regiment, South African Artillery
7th Field Regiment, South African Artillery
1st Light Anti-Aircraft Regiment, South African Artillery
1st Anti-Tank Regiment, South African Artillery
1st Field Company, South African Engineers
2nd Field Company, South African Engineers
3rd Field Company, South African Engineers
5th Field Company, South African Engineers
19th Field Park Company, South African Engineers
South African 1st Division Signals

South African 1st Infantry Brigade (Brigadier E.P. Hartshorn)

1st Duke of Edinburgh's Own Rifles
1st Royal Natal Carabineers
1st Transvaal Scottish

South African 2nd Infantry Brigade (Brigadier Evered Poole)

1st Cape Town Highlanders
1st Natal Mounted Rifles
1st/2nd Field Force Battalion

South African 3rd Infantry Brigade

1st Imperial Light Horse
1st Rand Light Infantry
1st Royal Durban Light Infantry

Indian 4th Infantry Division
Major-General 'Francis Tuker

Division-level Units

Central India Horse (reconnaissance regiment)
5th Battalion, 6th Rajputana Rifles (machine gun battalion)
1st Field Regiment Royal Artillery
11th Field Regiment, Royal Artillery
32nd Field Regiment, Royal Artillery
149th Anti-Tank Regiment, Royal Artillery
57th Light Anti-Aircraft Regiment, Royal Artillery
2nd Field Company, Bengal Sappers and Miners
4th Field Company, Bengal Sappers and Miners
12th Field Company, Madras Sappers and Miners
11th Field Park Company, Madras Sappers and Miners
4th Indian Division Signals

Indian 5th Infantry Brigade (Brigadier Dudley Russell)

1/4th Battalion, Essex Regiment
4th (Outram's) Battalion, 6th Rajputana Rifles
3rd (Queen Mary's Own) Battalion, 10th Baluch Regiment

Indian 7th Infantry Brigade (Brigadier Arthur Holworthy)

1st Battalion, Royal Sussex Regiment
4th Battalion, 16th Punjab Regiment
1st Battalion, 2nd King Edward's Own Gurkha Rifles

Indian 161st Infantry Brigade (Brigadier Francis E.C. Hughes)

1st Battalion, Argyll and Sutherland Highlanders
1st Battalion, 1st Punjab Regiment
4th Battalion, 7th Rajput Regiment

Corps Reserve

British 23rd Armoured Brigade (Note: 186 Valentine tanks) (Brigadier George W. Richards)

8th Royal Tank Regiment (detached to 1 SA Division)
40th Royal Tank Regiment (detached to 9 Australian Division)
46th Royal Tank Regiment
50th Royal Tank Regiment (detached to 51st Highland Division)
121st Field Regiment, Royal Artillery
168th Battery, 56th Light Anti-Aircraft Regiment, Royal Artillery
295th Army Field Company, Royal Engineers (Note: Three troops detached to 50th Royal Tank Regiment with 51st (Highland) Division)

=== British XIII Corps ===
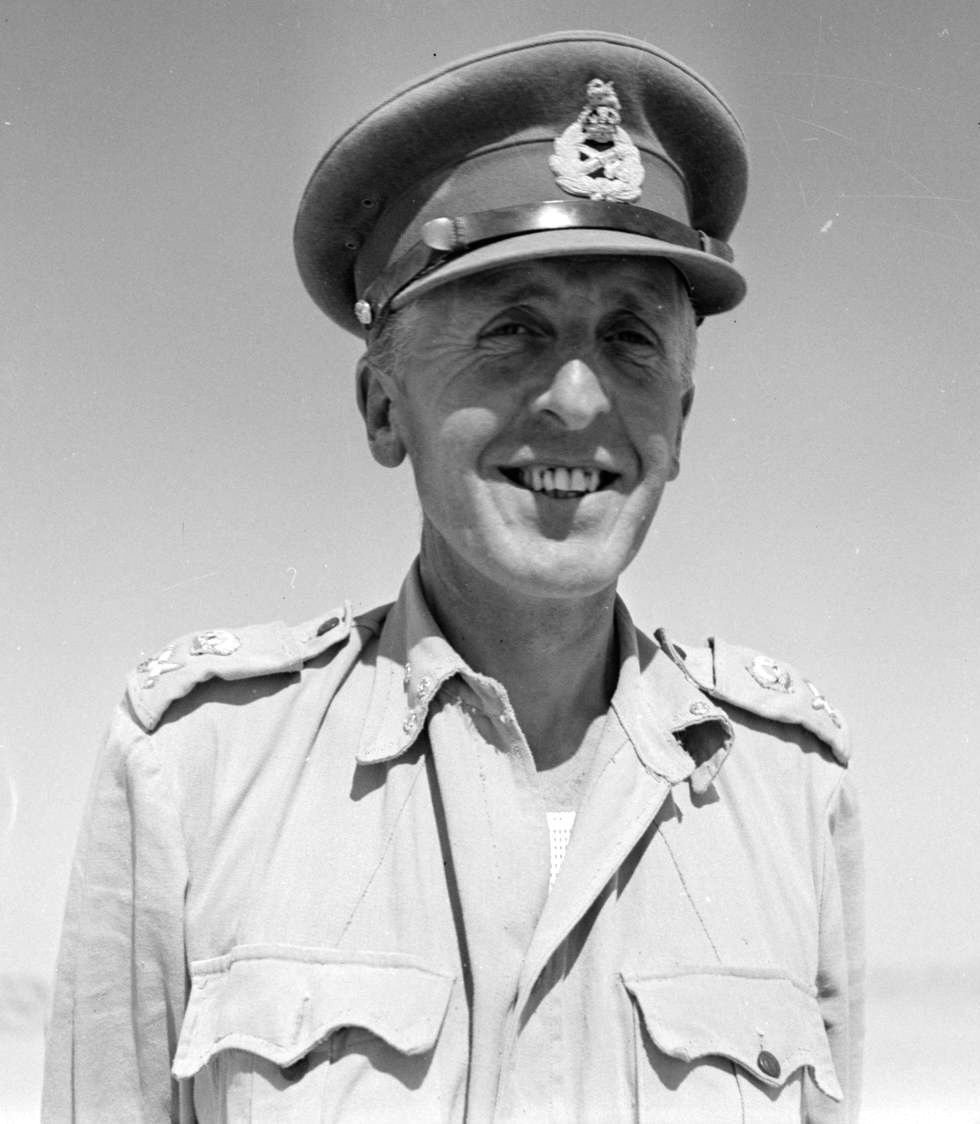
Lt.-Gen. Brian Horrocks

XIII Corps occupied the southern sector of the Allied front.

Lieutenant-General Brian Horrocks

Under direct Corps command

South African 4th/6th Armoured Car Regiment (one troop)
XIII Corps Troops, Royal Engineers

578th Army Field Company, Royal Engineers
576th Corps Field Park Company, Royal Engineers

XIII Corps Signals, Royal Corps of Signals

Divisions deployed north to south

British 50th (Northumbrian) Infantry Division
Major-General John S. Nichols

Division-level units

2nd Battalion, Cheshire Regiment (machine gun battalion)
74th Field Regiment, Royal Artillery
111th Field Regiment, Royal Artillery
124th Field Regiment, Royal Artillery
154th (Leicestershire Yeomanry) Field Regiment, Royal Artillery
102nd (Northumberland Hussars) Anti-Tank Regiment, Royal Artillery
34th Light Anti-Aircraft Regiment, Royal Artillery
50th (Northumbrian) Divisional Engineers, Royal Engineers

233rd Field Company, Royal Engineers
505th Field Company, Royal Engineers
235th Field Park Company, Royal Engineers

50th Northumbrian Division Signals, Royal Corps of Signals

Greek 1st Infantry Brigade (Colonel Pausanias Katsotas)

1st Infantry Battalion
2nd Infantry Battalion
3rd Infantry Battalion
1st Greek Field Artillery Regiment
1st Greek Machine Gun Company
1st Greek Field Company, Greek Engineers

British 151st Infantry Brigade (Note: Attached to New Zealand 2nd Division 29 October to 3 November) (Brigadier Joscelyn E.S. Percy)

6th Battalion, Durham Light Infantry
8th Battalion, Durham Light Infantry
9th Battalion, Durham Light Infantry

British 69th Infantry Brigade (Brigadier Edward C. Cooke-Collis)

5th Battalion, East Yorkshire Regiment
6th Battalion, Green Howards
7th Battalion, Green Howards

2nd Free French Brigade Group (under command)

5th Battalion de Marche
11th Battalion de Marche
21st and 23rd North African Anti-Tank Companies
2nd Company, Free French Engineers

British 44th (Home Counties) Infantry Division
Major-General 'Ivor Hughes

Division-level units

44th Reconnaissance Regiment (detached to 7th Armoured Division)
6th Battalion, Cheshire Regiment (machine gun battalion)
53rd Field Regiment, Royal Artillery
57th (Home Counties) Field Regiment, Royal Artillery
58th (Sussex) Field Regiment, Royal Artillery
65th (8th London) Field Regiment, Royal Artillery
57th (East Surrey) Anti-Tank Regiment, Royal Artillery
30th Light Anti-Aircraft Regiment, Royal Artillery
44th (Home Counties) Divisional Engineers

11th Field Company, Royal Engineers
209th (Sussex) Field Company, Royal Engineers
210th (Sussex) Field Company, Royal Engineers
211th (Sussex) Field Park Company, Royal Engineers
577th Army Field Company, Royal Engineers (attached from XIII Corps Troops Royal Engineers)

44th (Home Counties) Divisional Signals, Royal Corps of Signals

British 131st Infantry Brigade (Brigadier William Donovan Stamer)

1/5th Battalion, Queen's Royal Regiment (West Surrey)
1/6th Battalion, Queen's Royal Regiment (West Surrey)
1/7th Battalion, Queen's Royal Regiment (West Surrey)

British 132nd Infantry Brigade (Brigadier Lashmer Whistler)

2nd Battalion, Buffs (Royal East Kent Regiment)
4th Battalion, Queen's Own Royal West Kent Regiment
5th Battalion, Queen's Own Royal West Kent Regiment

British 133rd (Lorried) Infantry Brigade (Detached to 10th Armoured Division)

British 7th Armoured Division
Major-General John Harding

Division-level units

1st Household Cavalry Regiment
11th Hussars (under command from 4th Armoured Brigade, in reserve])
2nd Derbyshire Yeomanry (under command from 8th Armoured Division)
44th Reconnaissance Regiment (under command from 44th Infantry Division)
3rd Regiment, Royal Horse Artillery
4th Field Regiment, Royal Artillery
97th (Kent Yeomanry) Field Regiment, Royal Artillery
65th (Norfolk Yeomanry) Anti-Tank Regiment, Royal Artillery
15th (Isle of Man) Light Anti-Aircraft Regiment, Royal Artillery
7th Armoured Divisional Engineers

4th Field Squadron, Royal Engineers
21st Field Squadron, Royal Engineers
143rd Field Park Squadron, Royal Engineers

7th Armoured Division Signals, Royal Corps of Signals

British 4th Light Armoured Brigade (Note: 57 Stuart, 14 Grant = 71 tanks and 9 armoured cars) (Brigadier Marcus G. Roddick)

Royal Scots Greys
4th/8th Hussars
1st Battalion, King's Royal Rifle Corps

British 22nd Armoured Brigade (Note: 57 Grant, 50 Crusader, 19 Stuart = 126 tanks) (Brigadier George "Pip" Roberts)

1st Royal Tank Regiment
5th Royal Tank Regiment
4th County of London Yeomanry (Sharpshooters)
1st Battalion, Rifle Brigade

1st Free French Brigade Group (under command) (Brigadier Marie Pierre Koenig)

1st Battalion, Foreign Legion
2nd Battalion, Foreign Legion
3rd Battalion, Pacific Marine Infantry
3rd Field Regiment, Royal Artillery (attached)
1st Free French Artillery Regiment
2nd Anti-Aircraft Company, 1st Marine Fusiliers
2nd Free French Anti-Tank Company
22nd North African Anti-Tank Company
1st Field Company, Free French Engineers

With (under command)

1st Free French Flying Column
Armoured Car Squadron and Portee troop, 1st Morocco Spahis
1st Free French Tank Company
Anti-Aircraft troop, 1st Battalion, French Foreign Legion

=== British X Corps ===
X Corps supplied reserve divisions behind the main Allied line.

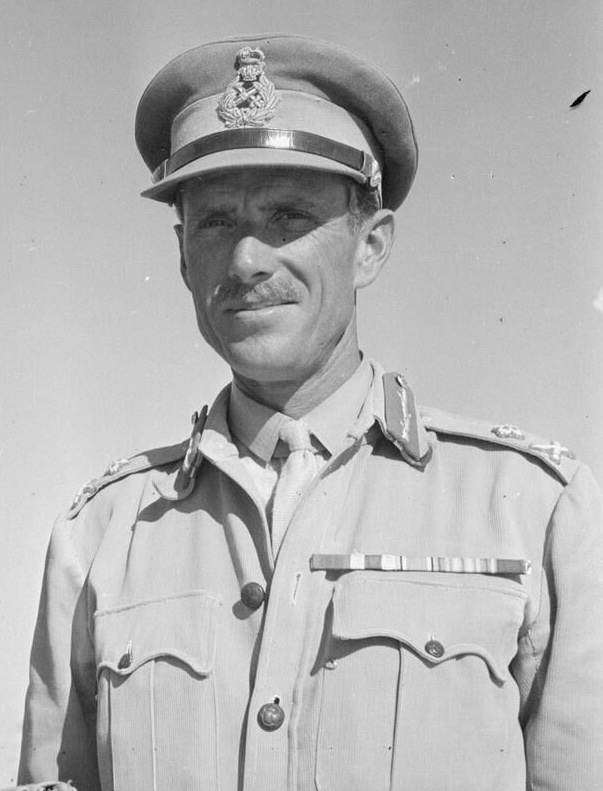
Lt.-Gen. Herbert Lumsden

Lieutenant-General Herbert Lumsden

Under direct Corps command

X Corps Troops, Royal Engineers

571st Army Field Company (attached to 10th Armoured Division)
572nd Army Field Company (attached to 1st Armoured Division)
573rd Army Field Company (attached to 10th Armoured Division)
570th Corps Field Park Company

X Corps Signals, Royal Corps of Signals

Divisions deployed north to south

British 1st Armoured Division
Major-General Raymond Briggs

Division-level units

12th Royal Lancers
2nd Regiment, Royal Horse Artillery
4th Regiment, Royal Horse Artillery
11th Regiment, Royal Horse Artillery (Honourable Artillery Company) (Note: Equipped with M7 Priest self-propelled artillery) (ex-8th Armoured Division)
76th (Royal Welch Fusiliers) Anti-Tank Regiment, Royal Artillery
42nd Light Anti-Aircraft Regiment, Royal Artillery
1st Armoured Divisional Engineers

1st Field Squadron, Royal Engineers
9th Field Squadron, Royal Engineers (from 8th Armoured Division)

1st Armoured Division Signals, Royal Corps of Signals

British 2nd Armoured Brigade (Note: 92 Sherman, 68 Crusader, one Grant = 161 tanks) (Brigadier Arthur Fisher)

2nd Dragoon Guards (Queen's Bays)
9th Queen's Royal Lancers
10th Royal Hussars
Yorkshire Dragoons (Motor battalion)
X Company, 1st Battalion, Royal Northumberland Fusiliers (machine gun battalion)

British 7th Motor Brigade (Brigadier Thomas Bosvile)

2nd Battalion, Kings Royal Rifle Corps
2nd Battalion, Rifle Brigade (Note: Detached less support company to Hammerforce)
7th Battalion, Rifle Brigade

Hammerforce (attached from 8th Armoured Division)

4th/6th South African Armoured Car Regiment
146th (Pembroke & Cardiganshire) Field Regiment, Royal Artillery
73rd Anti-Tank Regiment, Royal Artillery
56th Light Anti-Aircraft Regiment, Royal Artillery
Z Company, 1st Battalion, Royal Northumberland Fusiliers (machine gun company)
7th Field Squadron, Royal Engineers
9th Field Squadron, Royal Engineers

Minefield Task Force (Note: Attached to Hammerforce for mine clearance.) (under Commanding Officer, 2nd Bn Rifle Brigade)

2nd Dragoon Guards (Queen's Bays) (one troop)
9th Queen's Royal Lancers (one troop)
10th Royal Hussars (one troop)
7th Field Squadron, Royal Engineers
9th Field Squadron, Royal Engineers (from 8th Armoured Division)
572nd Army Field Company (from X Corps Troops Royal Engineers)
2nd Battalion, Rifle Brigade (less Support Company)

British 10th Armoured Division
Major-General Alexander Gatehouse

Division-level units

Royal Dragoons
1st Regiment, Royal Horse Artillery
5th Regiment, Royal Horse Artillery (attached from 8th Armoured Division)
104th (Essex Yeomanry) Regiment, Royal Horse Artillery (attached from 8th Armoured Division)
98th (Surrey & Sussex Yeomanry Queen Mary’s) Field Regiment, Royal Artillery
84th Anti-Tank Regiment, Royal Artillery
53rd (King's Own Yorkshire Light Infantry) Light Anti-Aircraft Regiment, Royal Artillery
10th Armoured Divisional Engineers

2nd Field Squadron, Royal Engineers
3rd Field Squadron, Royal Engineers (attached to Minefield Task Force)
6th Field Squadron, Royal Engineers (attached from 8th Armoured Division)
141st Field Park Squadron, Royal Engineers

10th Armoured Division Signals, Royal Corps of Signals

British 8th Armoured Brigade (Note: 45 Crusader, 57 Grant, 31 Sherman = 133 tanks) (Brig. Edward C.N. Custance)

3rd Royal Tank Regiment
Sherwood Rangers Yeomanry
Staffordshire Yeomanry
1st Battalion, Buffs (Royal East Kent Regiment)

British 24th Armoured Brigade (Note: 2 Grants, 93 Sherman, 45 Crusader = 140 tanks) (Brigadier Arthur G. Kenchington) (Attached from 8th Armoured Division)

41st Royal Tank Regiment
45th Royal Tank Regiment
47th Royal Tank Regiment
11th Battalion, Kings Royal Rifle Corps

British 133rd Infantry Brigade (Note: Attached from 44th Infantry Division) (Brigadier Alec W. Lee)

2nd Battalion, Royal Sussex Regiment
4th Battalion, Royal Sussex Regiment
5th Battalion, Royal Sussex Regiment
W Company, 1st Battalion, Royal Northumberland Fusiliers (machine gun company) (attached from 8th Armoured Division)

Minefield Task Force (Lt.-Col. G.R. McMeekan, Commanding Royal Engineer, 10th Armoured Division) (attached to 133rd Bde for mine clearance)

3rd Field Squadron, Royal Engineers
571st Army Field Company (from X Corps Troops Royal Engineers)
573rd Army Field Company (from X Corps Troops Royal Engineers)
141 Field Park Squadron (detachment)

British 8th Armoured Division
Major-General Charles Gairdner

6th Field Squadron, Royal Engineers (detached to 10th Armoured Division)
9th Field Squadron, Royal Engineers (detached to 1st Armoured Division)
145th Field Park Squadron, Royal Engineers
8th Armoured Division Signals, Royal Corps of Signals

== Axis ==
Delegazione Africa Settentrionale (Delease)

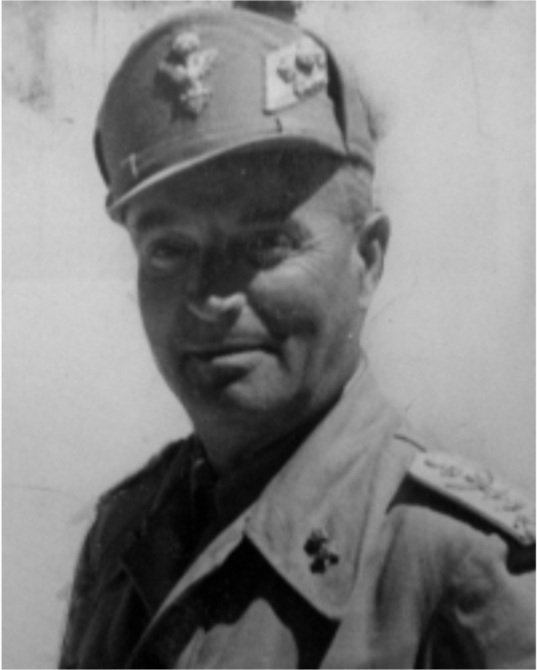
Lieutenant-General Curio Barbasetti

Generale di Corpo D'Armata (Note: Equivalent to the rank of Lieutenant-General) Curio Barbasetti

=== Panzerarmee Afrika ===
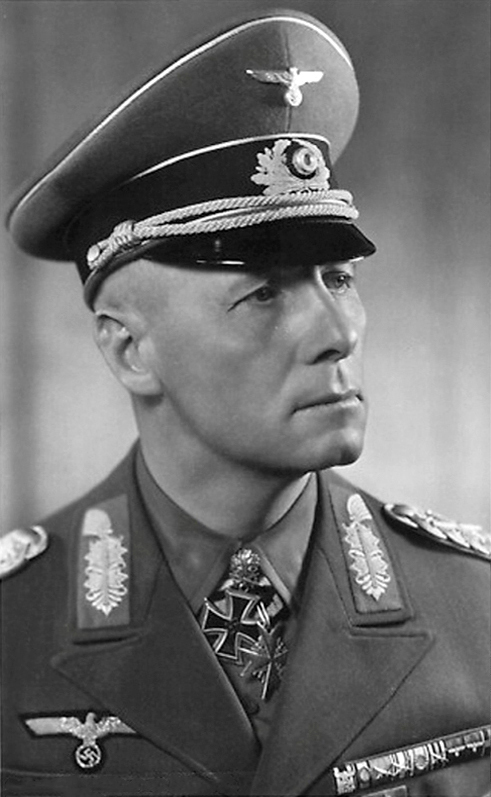
Field Marshal Erwin Rommel

Generalfeldmarschall (Note: Equivalent to a British Field Marshal) Erwin Rommel (Note: General der Panzertruppe Georg Stumme was in command at the start of the battle in Rommel's absence on sick on leave.)

Divisions deployed north to south

=== Deutsches Afrika Korps ===
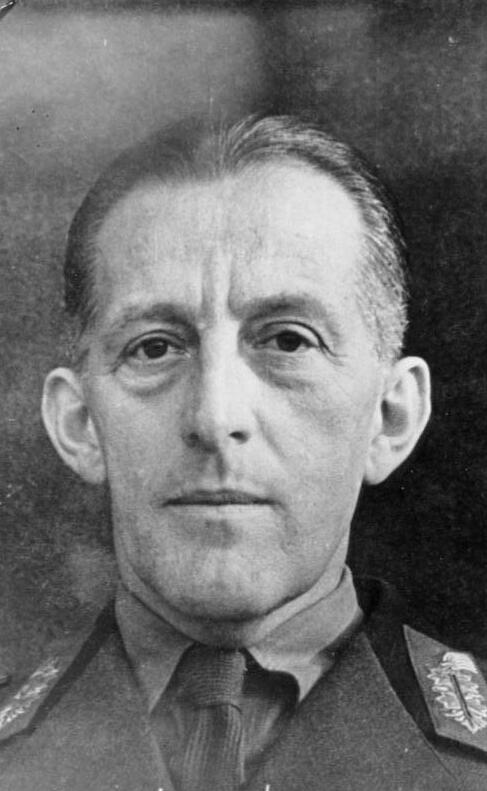
Gnlltnt. Wilhem Ritter von Thoma

Generalleutnant (Note: Equivalent to an Anglo-American Major-General) Wilhelm Ritter von Thoma

German 90th Light Afrika Division

- Generalmajor (Note: Equivalent to an Anglo-American Brigadier-General) Ernst Strecker, later Theodor Graf von Sponeck
  - 155th Panzergrenadier Regiment (with 707th Heavy Infantry Gun Company)
  - 200th Panzergrenadier Regiment (with 708th Heavy Infantry Gun Company)
  - 346th Panzergrenadier Regiment (Note: Should be 361st, 346th assigned to 217th Inf Div, the 361st was formed in theatre from former French Foreign Legionnaires of German origin)
  - 190th Artillery Regiment
  - 190th Anti-tank Battalion
  - Under command
    - Force 288 (Note: Panzergrenadier Regiment Afrika, the three battalions listed after this are not part of this 8-to-10 company detachment)
    - 605th Anti-tank Battalion
    - 109th Anti-aircraft Battalion
    - 606th Anti-aircraft Battalion
- German 15th Panzer Division
- Generalmajor (Note: Equivalent to an Anglo-American Brigadier-General) Gustav von Vaerst
  - 8th Panzer Regiment
  - 115th Panzergrenadier Regiment
  - 33rd Artillery Regiment
  - 33rd Anti-tank Battalion
  - 33rd Engineer Battalion
- German 21st Panzer Division
- Generalmajor (Note: Equivalent to an Anglo-American Brigadier-General) Heinz von Randow
  - 5th Panzer Regiment
  - 104th Panzergrenadier Regiment
  - 155th Artillery Regiment
  - 39th Anti-tank Battalion
  - 200th Engineer Battalion

=== Italian XXI Army Corps ===
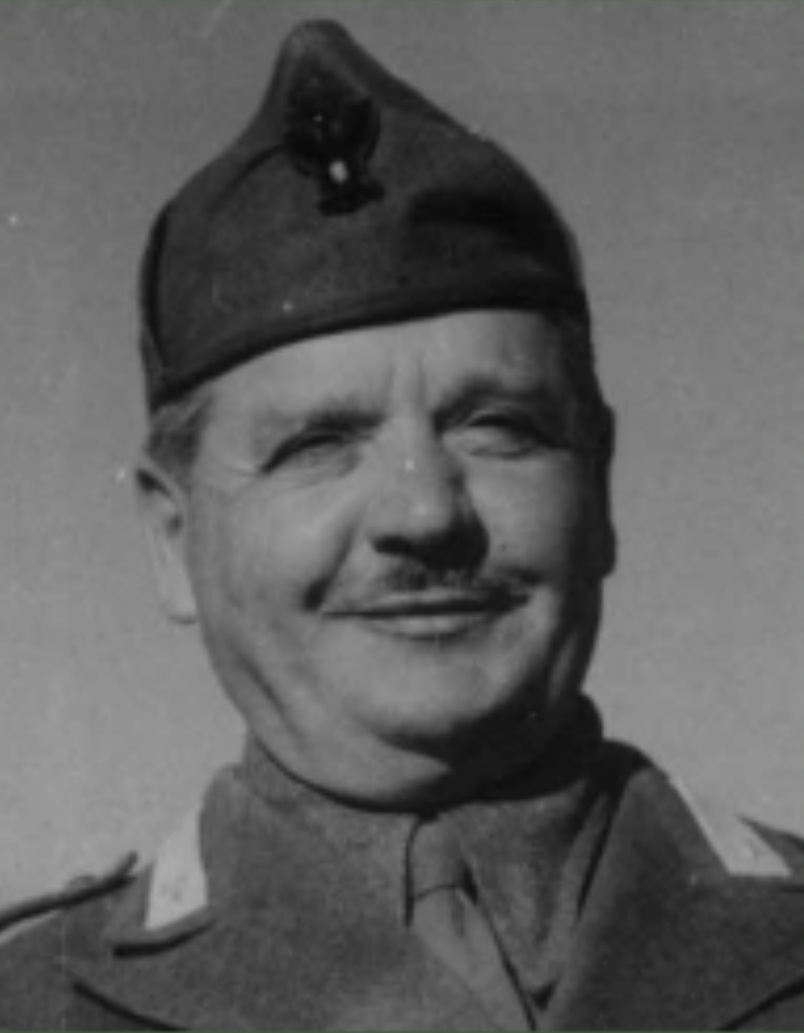
Lieutenant-General Enea Navarini

Generale di Corpo d'Armata Enea Navarini
Generale di Divisione Alessandro Gloria (thru 26 October)

- Corps-level troops
  - 7th Bersaglieri Regiment
    - X Auto-transported Battalion
    - XI Auto-transported Battalion
  - 8th Army Corps Artillery Grouping
    - XXXIII Heavy Artillery Group (149/40 mod. 35 guns)
    - LII Heavy Artillery Group (152/37 guns)
  - XXVII Construction Engineers Battalion
  - LXV Signal Engineers Battalion
  - 14th Fortification Engineer Company

- 102nd Motorised Division "Trento"
- Generale di Brigata Giorgio Masina
  - 61st Infantry Regiment "Trento" (3 × battalions)
  - 62nd Infantry Regiment "Trento" (3 × battalions)
  - 46th Motorised Artillery Regiment "Trento"
    - I Group (100/17 mod. 14 howitzers)
    - II Group (100/17 mod. 14 howitzers)
    - III Group (75/27 mod. 06 field guns)
    - IV Group (75/27 and 75/13 mod. 15 field guns)
    - 412th Anti-aircraft Battery (20/65 mod. 35 anti-aircraft guns)
    - 414th Anti-aircraft Battery (20/65 mod. 35 anti-aircraft guns)
  - LXIII Anti-aircraft Group (75/50 anti-aircraft guns)
  - CCCLIV Frontier Guard Artillery Group (77/28 field guns)
  - CCCLV Frontier Guard Artillery Group (75/27 mod. 06 field guns)
  - CXXXI Heavy Artillery Group (149/28 howitzers)
  - IV Anti-tank Battalion "Granatieri di Sardegna" (47/32 mod. 35 anti-tank guns)
  - LI Mixed Engineer Battalion
- 25th Infantry Division "Bologna"
- Generale di Divisione Alessandro Gloria
  - 39th Infantry Regiment "Bologna" (3 × battalions)
  - 40th Infantry Regiment "Bologna" (2 × battalions)
  - 205th Artillery Regiment "Bologna"
    - I Group (100/17 mod. 14 howitzers)
    - II Group (100/17 mod. 14 howitzers)
    - III Group (75/27 mod. 06 field guns)
    - IV Group (75/27 mod. 06 field guns)
    - 4th Anti-aircraft Battery (20/65 Mod. 35 anti-aircraft guns)
    - 437th Anti-aircraft Battery (20/65 Mod. 35 anti-aircraft guns)
  - CCCLVII Frontier Guard Artillery Group (77/28 field guns)
  - XXV Mixed Engineer Battalion

=== Italian XX Army Corps ===
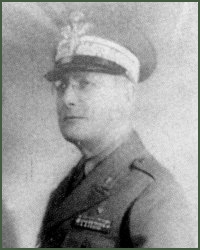
Lieutenant-General Giuseppe De Stefanis

Generale di Divisione Giuseppe De Stefanis

- Corps-level troops
  - XVIII Anti-aircraft and Anti-tank Group (8.8cm Flak and 20/65 mod. 35 anti-aircraft guns)
  - LXII Anti-aircraft Group (75/50 anti-aircraft guns)
  - XXIV Mixed Engineer Battalion
  - 2nd Bersaglieri Motorcyclists Company
  - 106th Field Hospital
  - 576th Field Hospital

Northern Sector

- 101st Motorised Division "Trieste"
- Generale di Divisione Francesco La Ferla
  - 65th Infantry Regiment "Trieste" (2 × battalions)
  - 66th Infantry Regiment "Trieste" (2 × battalions)
  - 21st Motorised Artillery Regiment "Trieste"
    - I Group (100/17 mod. 14 howitzers)
    - II Group (100/17 mod. 14 howitzers)
    - III Group (75/27 mod. 06 field guns)
    - IV Group (75/27 mod. 06 field guns)
    - 5th Battery / XLII Anti-aircraft Group (75/50 anti-aircraft guns)
  - VIII Armoured Bersaglieri Battalion (AB 41 armoured cars)
  - XI Tank Battalion "M" (M13/40 and M14/41 tanks)
  - XXXII Mixed Motorised Engineer Battalion
- German 164th Light Africa Division
- Generalleutnant (Note: Equivalent to an Anglo-American Major-General) Carl-Hans Lungershausen
  - 125th Infantry Regiment
  - 382nd Infantry Regiment
  - 433rd Infantry Regiment
  - 220th Artillery Regiment
  - 220th Engineer Battalion
  - 220th Cyclist Unit
  - 609th Anti-aircraft Battalion

- 133rd Armoured Division "Littorio"
- Generale di Divisione Gervasio Bitossi
  - 133rd Tank Infantry Regiment (M13/40 and M14/41 tanks)
    - IV Tank Battalion "M"
    - XII Tank Battalion "M"
    - LI Tank Battalion "M"
  - 12th Bersaglieri Regiment
    - XXI Support Weapons Battalion (Breda M37 heavy machine guns), 81mm mod. 35 mortars, 20/65 mod. 35 anti-aircraft guns)
    - XXIII Auto-transported Battalion
    - XXXVI Auto-transported Battalion
  - 3rd Fast Artillery Regiment
    - II Group (75/27 mod. 06 field guns)
    - III Group (105/28 howitzers)
    - 5th Anti-aircraft Battery (20/65 mod. 35 anti-aircraft guns)
    - 406th Anti-aircraft Battery (20/65 mod. 35 anti-aircraft guns)
  - DLIV Self-propelled Artillery Group (Semovente 75/18)
  - DLVI Self-propelled Artillery Group (Semovente 75/18)
  - CCCXXXII Frontier Guard Artillery Group (100/17 mod. 14 howitzers)
  - XXIX Anti-aircraft and Anti-tank Group (8.8cm Flak)
  - III Armoured Group "Lancieri di Novara" (L6/40 light tanks)
  - CXXXIII Mixed Engineer Battalion

Southern Sector

- 132nd Armoured Division "Ariete"
- Generale di Divisione Francesco Antonio Arena
  - 132nd Tank Infantry Regiment (M13/40 and M14/41 tanks)
    - IX Tank Battalion "M"
    - X Tank Battalion "M"
    - XIII Tank Battalion "M"
  - 8th Bersaglieri Regiment
    - III Support Weapons Battalion (Breda M37 heavy machine guns), 81mm mod. 35 mortars, 20/65 mod. 35 anti-aircraft guns)
    - V Auto-transported Battalion
    - XII Auto-transported Battalion
  - 132nd Armoured Artillery Regiment
    - I Group (75/27 mod. 06 field guns)
    - II Group (75/27 mod. 06 field guns)
    - III Group (105/28 howitzers)
    - V (DLI) Self-propelled Artillery Group (Semovente 75/18 self-propelled guns)
    - VI (DLII) Self-propelled Artillery Group (Semovente 75/18 self-propelled guns)
  - XV Heavy Field Artillery Group (105/28 howitzers)
  - XXXI Anti-aircraft and Anti-tank Group (8.8cm Flak anti-aircraft guns)
  - DI Anti-aircraft and Anti-tank Group (90/53 and 20/65 mod. 35 anti-aircraft guns)
  - III Armored Squadrons Group "Nizza Cavalleria" (AB 41 Armoured cars)
  - CXXXII Mixed Engineer Battalion

=== Italian X Army Corps ===
Lieutenant-General Enrico Frattini

Generale di Divisione Federico Ferrari Orsi (KIA 18 October)
Generale di Divisione Enrico Frattini (thru 26 October)
Generale di Divisione Edoardo Nebbia (from 27 October, POW 7 November)

- Corps-level troops
  - 9th Bersaglieri Regiment
    - XXVIII Auto-transported Battalion
    - XXX Auto-transported Battalion
  - 16th Army Corps Artillery Grouping
    - XLIX Artillery Group (105/28 howitzers)
    - CXLVII Heavy Artillery Group (149/28 howitzers)
  - X Construction Engineers Battalion
  - X Signal Engineers Battalion
  - XXXI Sappers Battalion
  - 65th Field Hospital
  - 91st Field Hospital

- 27th Infantry Division "Brescia"
- Generale di Divisione Brunetto Brunetti
  - 19th Infantry Regiment "Brescia" (2 × battalions)
  - 20th Infantry Regiment "Brescia" (3 × battalions)
  - 1st Fast Artillery Regiment "Eugenio di Savoia"
    - I Group (100/17 mod. 14 howitzers)
    - III Group (75/27 mod. 06 field guns)
    - IV Group (75/27 mod. 06 field guns)
    - V Group (8.8cm Flak and 20/65 mod. 35 anti-aircraft guns)
    - 401st Anti-aircraft Battery (20/65 mod. 35 anti-aircraft guns)
    - 404th Anti-aircraft Battery (20/65 mod. 35 anti-aircraft guns)
  - XXVII Mixed Engineer Battalion
- German Ramcke Parachute Brigade
- Generalmajor (Note: Equivalent to an Anglo-American Brigadier-General) Hermann-Bernhard Ramcke
  - 1st Battalion, 2nd Paratroopers Regiment
  - 1st Battalion, 3rd Paratroopers Regiment
  - 2nd Battalion, 5th Paratroopers Regiment
  - Lehrbattailion Burkhardt
  - Paratroopers Anti-tank Battalion
  - Paratroopers Artillery Battery
- 185th Infantry Division "Folgore"
- Generale di Divisione Enrico Frattini
  - 186th Infantry Regiment "Folgore"
    - V Paratroopers Battalion
    - VI Paratroopers Battalion
    - VII Paratroopers Battalion
    - 186th Cannons Company (47/32 mod. 35 anti-tank guns)
  - 187th Infantry Regiment "Folgore"
    - II Paratroopers Battalion
    - IV Paratroopers Battalion
    - IX Paratroopers Battalion
    - 187th Cannons Company (47/32 mod. anti-tank guns)
  - 185th Artillery Regiment "Folgore"
    - I Paratroopers Artillery Group (3 × batteries with 47/32 mod. 35 anti-tank guns)
    - III Paratroopers Artillery Group (3 × batteries with 47/32 mod. 35 anti-tank guns)
    - 146th Anti-aircraft Battery (20/65 Mod. 35 anti-aircraft guns)
    - 411th Anti-aircraft Battery (20/65 Mod. 35 anti-aircraft guns)
    - Services Battery
  - VIII Paratroopers Sappers Battalion
- 17th Infantry Division "Pavia"
- Generale di Divisione Nazzareno Scattaglia
  - 27th Infantry Regiment "Pavia" (2 × battalions)
  - 28th Infantry Regiment "Pavia" (2 × battalions)
  - 26th Artillery Regiment "Pavia"
    - II Group (100/17 mod. 14 howitzers)
    - III Group (75/27 mod. 06 field guns)
    - IV Group (75/27 mod. 06 field guns)
    - 77th Anti-aircraft Battery (20/65 mod. 35 anti-aircraft guns)
    - 432nd Anti-aircraft Battery (20/65 mod. 35 anti-aircraft guns)
  - XVII Mixed Engineer Battalion

Reserve Divisions during the Battle

- 16th Motorised Division "Pistoia"
- Generale di Divisione Giuseppe Falugi
  - 35th Infantry Regiment "Pistoia"
  - 36th Infantry Regiment "Pistoia"
  - 3rd Motorised Artillery Regiment
  - XVI Mortar Battalion (81mm mod. 35 mortars)
  - LI Mixed Engineer Battalion
  - 16th Anti-tank Company (47/32 mod. 35 anti-tank guns)
- 136th Armoured Division "Giovani Fascisti"
- Generale di Divisione Ismaele Di Nisio
  - Regiment "Giovani Fascisti" (3 × battalions)
  - IX Infantry Battalion
  - 136th Artillery Regiment
    - XIV Motorized Artillery Group (65/17 mod. 13 field guns mounted on Morris CS8)
    - XV Motorized Artillery Group (65/17 mod. 13 field guns mounted on Morris CS8)
    - XVI Motorized Artillery Group (75/27 mod. 11 field guns mounted on TL.37)
    - XVII Motorized Artillery Group (100/17 mod. 14 howitzers mounted on Lancia 3Ro trucks)
    - 88th Anti-aircraft Battery (20/65 mod. 35 anti-aircraft guns)
  - III Armoured Squadrons Group "Cavalleggeri di Monferrato" (AB 41 Armoured cars)

== Sources ==
- Joslen, H.F. (2003) [1st Pub. HMSO 1960]. Orders of battle : Second World War, 1939-1945. Uckfield: Naval & Military Press. ISBN 1-84342-474-6.
- Pakenham-Walsh, Maj-Gen R.P. (1958). History of the Royal Engineers. Vol. VIII, 1938–1948. Chatham: Institution of Royal Engineers.
- Wendell, Marcus. "Axis History Factbook: German army order of battle".
- Wendell, Marcus. "Axis History Factbook: Italian army order of battle".
- "Orders of Battle.com". Archived from the original on 2007-07-17.
- Houterman, Hans; Koppes, Jeroen. "World War II unit histories and officers". Archived from the original on 2007-06-26.
