= Robert Gatehouse =

British barrister and judge (1924–2002)

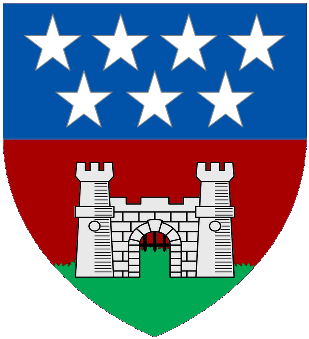
Arms displayed at Lincoln's Inn

Sir Robert Alexander Gatehouse (30 January 1924 – 30 October 2002) was a British barrister and judge. He was a Justice of the High Court (Queen's Bench Division) from 1985 to 1996.

== Biography ==
The son of Major-General Alexander Hugh Gatehouse, he attended Wellington College, before being commissioned into the Royal Dragoons during the Second World War. He saw service in Western Europe in 1944–1945 from the invasion of Normandy, when he was wounded, to the German surrender. During the war, he is said to have made an enemy tank surrender at gunpoint with his pistol.

Returning to civilian life, Gatehouse attended Trinity Hall, Cambridge; among his contemporaries were Lee Kuan Yew and Kwa Geok Choo.

Gatehouse was called to the bar in 1950 by Lincoln's Inn and joined the chambers of John Thompson, QC, which had a general common law practice and one in personal injury. In 1955, he moved chambers to 1 Brick Court (now Brick Court Chambers), where he had a mixed practice, including appeals to the Privy Council from Commonwealth countries. He became a Queen's Counsel in 1969. Among his most important cases as counsel was British Railways Board v Herrington [1972] AC 877, in which he acted for the British Railways Board.

Gatehouse was appointed to the High Court in 1985 and received the customary knighthood. He was assigned to the Queen's Bench Division and tried cases in the Commercial Court.
