= 232nd Signal Regiment =

Active Italian Army signal unit

- 232° Reggimento Trasmissioni
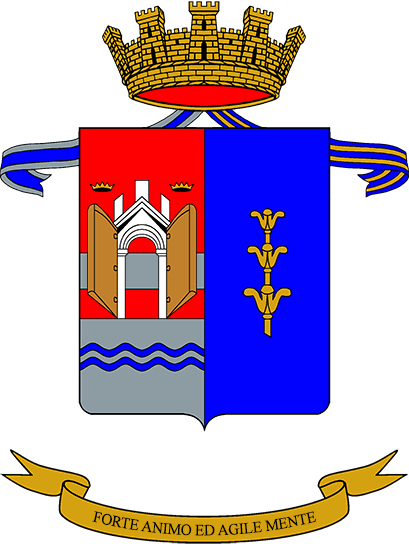
- Regimental coat of arms
- Active: 1 Nov. 1975 — 30 April 1991; 29 Sept. 2004 — today
- Country: Italy
- Branch: Italian Army
- Role: Military signals
- Part of: Signal Command
- Garrison/HQ: Avellino
- Motto: "Forte animo ed agile mente"
- Anniversaries: 20 June 1918 - Second Battle of the Piave River
- Decorations: 1× Silver Medal of Military Valor^{*} 1× Bronze Medal of Army Valor * awarded to the LI Mixed Engineer Battalion

Insignia
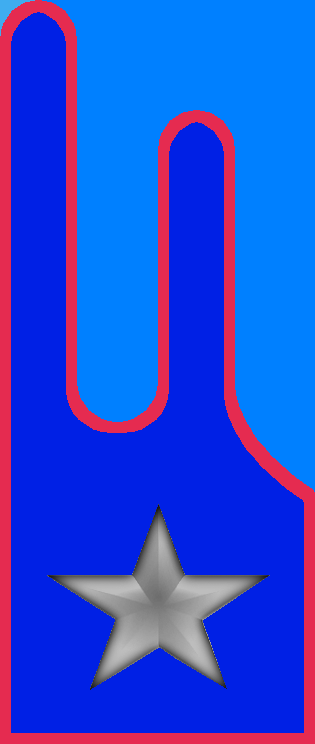
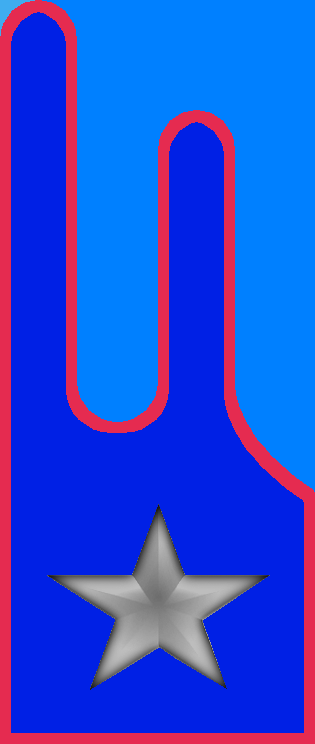
- Signallers gorget patches

The 232nd Signal Regiment (Italian: 232° Reggimento Trasmissioni) is an expeditionary signals regiment of the Italian Army based in Avellino in Campania. The unit was formed in 1958 as a battalion and assigned to the Armored Division "Ariete". In 1975, the battalion was named for the Sella di Fadalto Pass and received the number 232nd, which had been used by the 232nd Connections Company that had served with the 132nd Armored Division "Ariete" during the Western Desert campaign of World War II. With the name and number the battalion also received its own flag. In 1991, the battalion was disbanded. In 2004, the unit was reformed as 232nd Signal Regiment. Initially the regiment consisted only of the Signal Battalion "Legnano", but in 2015 the regiment reformed the Signal Battalion "Fadalto" as its second signal battalion. The regiment is assigned to the army's Signal Command and affiliated with the Division "Acqui". The regiment's anniversary falls, as for all signal units, on 20 June 1918, the day the Austro-Hungarian Army began its retreat across the Piave river during the Second Battle of the Piave River.

== History ==
=== World War II ===
In February 1939, the depot of the 4th Engineer Regiment in Bolzano formed the 132nd Mixed Engineer Company for the 132nd Armored Division "Ariete". In January 1941, the "Ariete" division was sent to Libya, where it fought in the Western Desert campaign. On 11 August 1941, the 132nd Mixed Engineer Company was split to form the 132nd Engineer Company and the 232nd Connections Company, which were both assigned on the same day to the newly formed XXXII Mixed Engineer Battalion. In November 1942, the "Ariete" division and with it the XXXII Mixed Engineer Battalion were destroyed during the Second Battle of El Alamein. On 8 December 1942, the division and its units were declared lost due to wartime events.

=== Cold War ===
On 23 May 1948, the Italian Army formed the Armored Brigade "Ariete" in Rome. The brigade included a connections platoon, which grew over the next years into a connections company. In 1948, the brigade was transferred to the city of Pordenone in the Friuli region in Northern Italy. On 1 October 1952, the brigade was expanded to Armored Division "Ariete". On 1 October 1958, the connections company was expanded to Signal Battalion "Ariete", which was based in the city of Casarsa della Delizia. At the time the battalion consisted of a command, a command platoon, the 1st Signal Company, and the 2nd Signal Company.

In 1963, the Italian Army reorganized its armored divisions along NATO standards and added a brigade level to the divisions' organization. As part of the reorganization the Signal Battalion "Ariete" formed a signal company for each of the division's three brigades. On 30 September 1968, the three brigade headquarters were disbanded and the next day, on 1 October 1968, the brigades' signal companies entered the Signal Battalion "Ariete", which renumbered them as 4th Signal Company, 5th Signal Company, and 6th Signal Company.

During the 1975 army reform the army disbanded the regimental level and newly independent battalions were granted for the first time their own flags. During the reform signal battalions were renamed for mountain passes. As part of the reform the Armored Division "Ariete" was reorganized and three new brigades were formed with the division's units: on 1 October 1975, the 32nd Armored Brigade "Mameli" and on 1 November 1975, the 8th Mechanized Brigade "Garibaldi" and 132nd Armored Brigade "Manin". On the same day, 1 November 1975, the Signal Battalion "Ariete" transferred the three signals companies, which had been formed during the 1963 reform, to the command and signal units of the new brigades. Also on the same day the Signal Battalion "Ariete" was renamed 232nd Signal Battalion "Fadalto". The battalion was named for the Sella di Fadalto Pass, which connects the cities of Vittorio Veneto and Belluno. After the reform the battalion consisted of a command, a command and services platoon, two signal companies, and a repairs and recovery platoon. At the time the battalion fielded 572 men (19 officers, 99 non-commissioned officers, and 454 soldiers). On 12 November 1976, the President of the Italian Republic Giovanni Leone granted with decree 846 the battalion a flag.

For its conduct and work after the 1976 Friuli earthquake the battalion was awarded a Bronze Medal of Army Valor, which was affixed to the battalion's flag and added to the battalion's coat of arms.

In 1986, the Armored Division "Ariete was disbanded. Consequently, on 1 August 1986, the battalion was transferred to the 5th Army Corps' Signal Command. On 1 June 1989, the battalion was reorganized and consisted afterwards of a command, a command and services company, the 1st Signal Center Company, the 2nd Signal Center Company, and the 3rd Radio Relay Company.

With the end of the Cold War the Italian Army began to draw down its forces and, on 30 April 1991, the 232nd Signal Battalion "Fadalto" was disbanded and the next day, the battalion's 3rd Radio Relay Company joined the 5th Signal Battalion "Rolle". On 13 May 1991, the battalion's flag was transferred to the Shrine of the Flags in the Vittoriano in Rome for safekeeping.

=== Recent times ===
On 29 September 2004, the 232nd Signal Regiment was reformed in Avellino as an expeditionary signal regiment capable to deploy and operate outside Italy. The regiment consisted of a command, a command and services company, and the Signal Battalion "Legnano" with three signal companies. The regiment received the flag and traditions of the 232nd Signal Battalion "Fadalto", as well as the traditions of the Signal Battalion "Legnano". The latter battalion had been part of the Infantry Division "Legnano" and had been disbanded on 29 November 1975. On 1 October 2015, the regiment reformed the Signal Battalion "Fadalto" as its second signal battalion.

== Organization ==
As of 2024 the 232nd Signal Regiment is organized as follows:

- 232nd Signal Regiment, in Avellino
  - Command and Logistic Support Company
  - Signal Battalion "Legnano"
    - 1st Signal Company
    - 2nd Signal Company
    - 3rd Signal Company
  - Signal Battalion "Fadalto"
    - 4th Signal Company
    - 5th Signal Company
    - 6th Signal Company
