= Alexander Gatehouse =

British Army general (1895–1964)

Major-General Alexander Gatehouse DSO* MC*
- Born: 20 May 1895
- Died: 21 August 1964 (aged 69); Sweden
- Military career
- Allegiance: United Kingdom
- Branch: British Army
- Service years: 1914–1947
- Rank: Major-General
- Nickname: "Alec"
- Service number: 5979
- Units: Northumberland Fusiliers; Royal Tank Corps
- Commands: 1st Armoured Division (1942); 10th Armoured Division (1942); 4th Armoured Brigade (1941–42); Mechanisation Experimental Establishment (1933–37)
- Conflicts: First World War; Second World War
- Awards: Distinguished Service Order & Bar; Military Cross & Bar; Mentioned in Despatches

Major-General Alexander Hugh Gatehouse, DSO & Bar, MC & Bar (20 May 1895 – 21 August 1964) was a senior British Army officer who commanded the 10th Armoured Division during the North African campaign of the Second World War.

== Military career ==
Gatehouse joined the British Army and, after graduating from the Royal Military College, Sandhurst, was commissioned as a second lieutenant into the Northumberland Fusiliers in October 1914 and fought in the First World War. He was promoted to lieutenant in May 1915. He was awarded the Military Cross (MC) in September 1918, the citation for which reads:

For conspicuous gallantry and devotion to duty while commanding a composite company of twenty Lewis guns. Under heavy enemy attacks his courage and cheerfulness inspired his men and caused them to hold on to a difficult position under very trying circumstances.

In November 1918, with only a few days left in the war, Gatehouse was awarded a Bar to his MC. The Bar's citation stated the following:

For conspicuous gallantry in command of a company of fourteen tanks. He followed close behind, as they proceeded into action, under heavy shell and machine-gun fire, and superintended their movements in the clearing of two enemy positions. During this time he was knocked down by a shell bursting beside him. In two subsequent actions he again displayed great courage, and the success of these tanks was in great measure due to his skill and judgment.

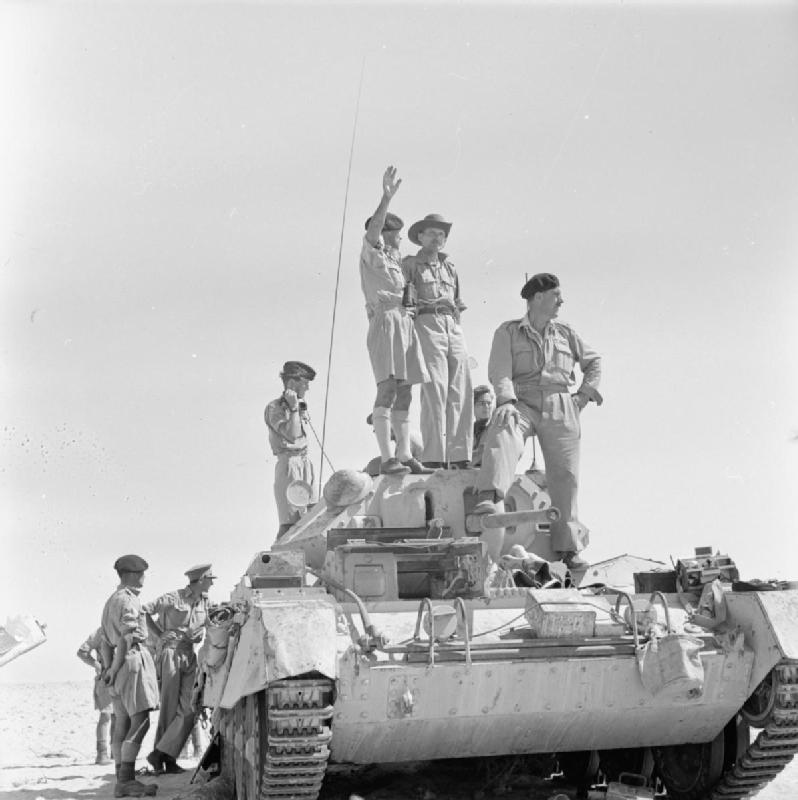
Lieutenant General Bernard Montgomery and Brigadier Philip "Pip" Roberts (pointing) stand on the turret of a Crusader tank to survey the battle area, 6 September 1942. Major General Alexander Gatehouse is pictured standing in front of them.

After the war Gatehouse transferred to the Royal Tank Corps (later the Royal Tank Regiment) in 1931. He was appointed commandant of the Mechanisation Experimental Establishment at Farnborough in 1933.

Gatehouse served in the Second World War as deputy commander of the 7th Armoured Brigade in the Western Desert from 1940, as commander of the 4th Armoured Brigade in the Western Desert from April 1941 and as General Officer Commanding 10th Armoured Division from June 1942. His permanent rank was advanced to colonel on 6 November 1940, with seniority backdated to 1 July, and he was awarded the Distinguished Service Order in December 1941 and a Bar to the award in January 1942. Having led the 10th Armoured Division at the Battle of Alam el Halfa in September 1942 and then the Second Battle of El Alamein in October 1942, he became major general in charge of administration at Washington D.C. at the end of the year, and military attaché in Moscow in 1944 before retiring in 1947.

== Family ==
In 1920 Gatehouse married Helen Williams; they had one son, Sir Robert Alexander Gatehouse, a Judge of the Queen's Bench Division of the High Court).

== Bibliography ==
- Mead, Richard (2007). Churchill's Lions: A Biographical Guide to the Key British Generals of World War II. Stroud: Spellmount. ISBN 978-1-86227-431-0.
- Smart, Nick (2005). Biographical Dictionary of British Generals of the Second World War. Barnesley: Pen & Sword. ISBN 1844150496.

Military offices
| Preceded by Herbert Lumsden | GOC 1st Armoured Division; 1942 | Succeeded by Herbert Lumsden |
| Preceded by George Clark | GOC 10th Armoured Division; 1942 | Succeeded by Charles Norman |
