= Signal Battalion "Legnano" =

Italian Army signal unit

- Battaglione Trasmissioni "Legnano"
- Active: 15 July 1935 — 13 May 1943; 13 Nov. 1943 — 29 Nov. 1975; 29 Sept. 2004 — today
- Country: Italy
- Branch: Italian Army
- Role: Military signals
- Part of: 232nd Signal Regiment
- Garrison/HQ: Avellino
- Anniversaries: 20 June 1918 - Second Battle of the Piave River
- Decorations: 1× Silver Medal of Military Valor

Insignia
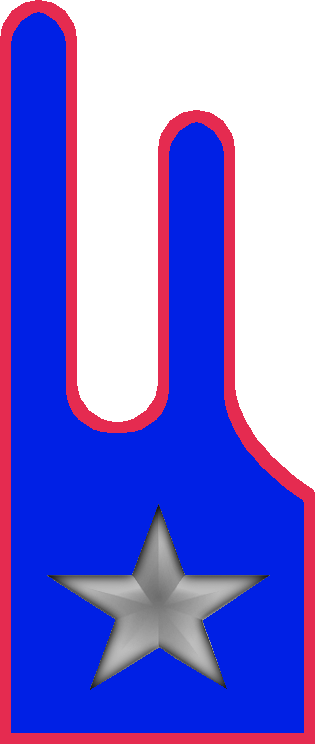
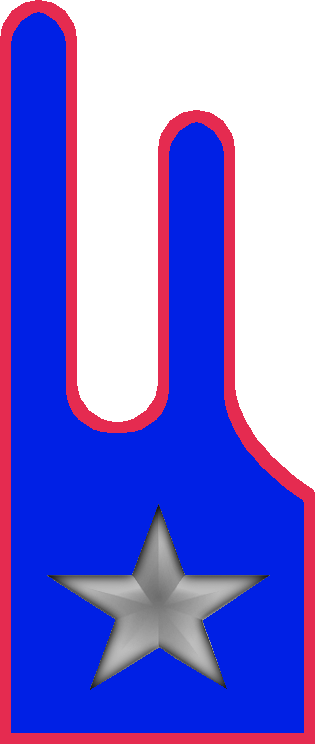
- Signallers gorget patches

The Signal Battalion "Legnano" (Italian: Battaglione Trasmissioni "Legnano") is a signals unit of the Italian Army based in Avellino in Campania. The battalion was formed in 1935 by the Royal Italian Army for the 102nd Motorized Division "Trento". In World War II the battalion fought in the Western Desert campaign and Tunisian campaign. In May 1943, the battalion surrendered to the allies. In November 1943, the battalion was reformed by the Italian Co-belligerent Army and then fought on the allied side in the Italian campaign. After the war the battalion was assigned to the Infantry Division "Legnano". In 1975, the battalion was disbanded. In 2004, the 232nd Signal Regiment was formed and received the reformed Signal Battalion "Legnano" as its signal battalion. The battalion's anniversary falls, as for all signal units, on 20 June 1918, the day the Austro-Hungarian Army began its retreat across the Piave river during the Second Battle of the Piave River.

== History ==
=== World War II ===
On 15 July 1935, the depot of the 4th Engineer Regiment in Trento formed the LI Mixed Engineer Battalion for the 32nd Motorized Division "Trento". From December 1935 to August 1936, during the Second Italo-Ethiopian War, the "Trento" division deployed to Libya. During World War II the "Trento" division fought in the Western Desert campaign, until the division was destroyed in November 1942 in the Second Battle of El Alamein. The LI Mixed Engineer Battalion suffered heavy losses at El Alamein and was brought back up to strength with the survivors of other destroyed engineer units. During the following Tunisian campaign the battalion was initially attached to the 27th Infantry Division "Brescia" and then to the 16th Infantry Division "Pistoia". On 13 May 1943, the remnants of the battalion surrendered to the allies.

On 13 November 1943, the Italian Co-belligerent Army reformed the LI Mixed Engineer Battalion in Colli a Volturno. At the time the battalion consisted of a command, the 51st Teleradio Company, and the 51st Engineer Company, which had been formed on 27 September 1943 in San Pietro Vernotico. At first the battalion was assigned to the I Motorized Grouping, but on 22 March 1944 it joined the Italian Liberation Corps. On 30 September 1944, the Italian Liberation Corps was reorganized as a combat group and renamed Combat Group "Legnano". After joining the combat group the battalion was augmented with the 3rd Engineer Company. For its service on the allied side during the Italian campaign the battalion was awarded a Silver Medal of Military Valor.

=== Cold War ===
After the end of the war the battalion was based in Bergamo and remained assigned to the Combat Group "Legnano". On 15 October 1945, the combat group was reorganized as Infantry Division "Legnano". At the time, the LI Mixed Engineer Battalion consisted of a command, the 3rd and 51st engineer companies, the 51st Teleradio Company, and the 3rd Field Park Company. On 1 December 1946, the battalion split to form the Engineer Battalion "Legnano" in Pavia and the Connections Battalion "Legnano" in Bergamo. The Connections Battalion "Legnano" consisted of a command, a command platoon, and three connections companies — one for the division's headquarters, one for the division's infantry regiments, and one for the division's artillery regiments.

On 1 October 1952, the Connections Speciality became an autonomous speciality of the Engineer Arm, with its own school and gorget patches. On 16 May 1953, the speciality adopted the name Signal Speciality and consequently, on 1 June 1953, the Connections Battalion "Legnano" was renamed Signal Battalion "Legnano". On 1 March 1954, the battalion was reduced to a company consisting of a command, a command platoon, two Marconisti platoons, a signals center platoon, a phone signals platoon. In July 1958, the company was expanded to Signal Battalion "Legnano" and consisted afterwards of a command, a command platoon, the 1st Signal Company, and the 2nd Signal Company.

On 1 October 1975, the Infantry Division "Legnano" was split to form the Mechanized Brigade "Legnano" and Mechanized Brigade "Brescia". On 29 November 1975, the Signal Battalion "Legnano" was disbanded and its personnel and materiel used to form the Command and Services Unit "Legnano" for the Mechanized Brigade "Legnano".

=== Recent times ===
On 29 September 2004, the 232nd Signal Regiment was formed in Avellino as an expeditionary signal regiment capable to deploy and operate outside Italy. The new regiment consisted of a command, a command and services company, and the Signal Battalion "Legnano", which in turn consisted of three signal companies. Upon entering the regiment, the Silver Medal of Military Valor awarded to the LI Mixed Engineer Battalion, was affixed to the flag of the 232nd Signal Regiment and added to the regiment's coat of arms. The regiment received the flag and traditions of the 232nd Signal Battalion "Fadalto", as well as the traditions of the Signal Battalion "Legnano". On 1 October 2015, the Signal Battalion Legnano was joined in the regiment by the reformed Signal Battalion "Fadalto".

== Organization ==
As of 2024 the Signal Battalion "Legnano" is organized as follows of:

- Signal Battalion "Legnano", in Avellino
  - 1st Signal Company
  - 2nd Signal Company
  - 3rd Signal Company
