= 3rd Artillery Regiment "Pistoia" =

Inactive Italian Army artillery unit

- 3° Reggimento Artiglieria "Pistoia"
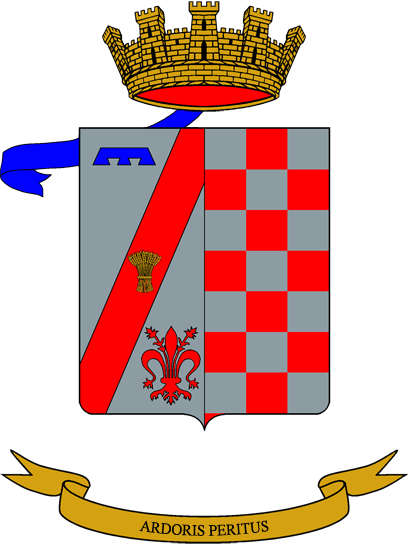
- Regimental coat of arms
- Active: 1 July 1860 — 13 May 1943; 1 Jan. 1950 — 1 July 1953; 21 Oct. 1975 — 30 April 1991
- Country: Italy
- Branch: Italian Army
- Part of: Mechanized Brigade "Goito"
- Garrison/HQ: Vercelli
- Motto: "Ardoris peritus"
- Anniversaries: 15 June 1913 - Second Battle of the Piave River
- Decorations: 1x Bronze Medal of Military Valor

Insignia
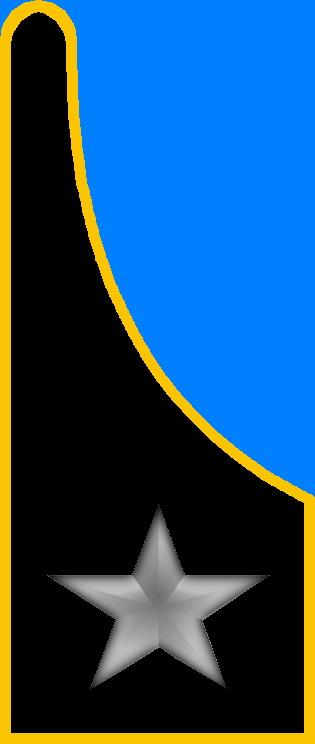
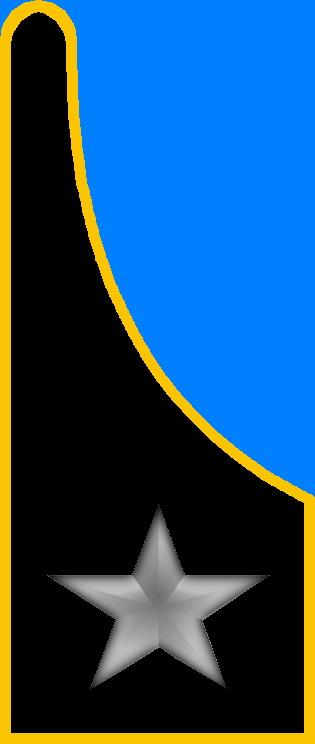
- Regimental gorget patches

The 3rd Artillery Regiment "Pistoia" (Italian: 3° Reggimento Artiglieria "Pistoia") is an inactive field artillery regiment of the Italian Army, which was based in Vercelli in Piedmont. The regiment was formed in 1860 by the Royal Sardinian Army and in 1861 joined the Royal Italian Army. During World War I the regiment served on the Italian front. In 1935 the regiment was assigned to the 16th Infantry Division "Fossalta", which in 1939 became the 16th Infantry Division "Pistoia". In September 1942 the division was transferred to North Africa for the Western Desert campaign of World War II. After the defeat in the Second Battle of El Alamein the division retreated with the other Axis forces into Tunisia, where the division fought in the Tunisian campaign until it surrendered to Allied forces on 13 May 1943.

The regiment was reformed in 1950 and assigned to the Infantry Division "Mantova". In 1953 the regiment was disbanded and its personnel used to reform the 6th Mountain Artillery Regiment. In 1975 the unit was reformed in Vercelli as 3rd Field Artillery Group "Pastrengo" and assigned to the 3rd Mechanized Brigade "Goito". In 1982 the group was equipped with self-propelled howitzers and renamed 3rd Self-propelled Field Artillery Group "Pastrengo". With the end of the Cold War the group was disbanded in 1991. The regimental anniversary falls, as for all Italian Army artillery regiments, on June 15, the beginning of the Second Battle of the Piave River in 1918.

This article is about the Royal Italian Army's 3rd Field Artillery Regiment, which was a support unit assigned to a division-level command. This regiment is unrelated to the 3rd Heavy Field Artillery Regiment, which was a support unit assigned to a corps-level command, and unrelated to the 3rd Heavy Artillery Regiment, which was a support unit assigned to an army-level command.

== History ==
=== Italian Wars of Independence ===
After the Second Italian War of Independence the Kingdom of Sardinia annexed on 22 March 1860 the Royal Provinces of Emilia and the Grand Duchy of Tuscany. Consequently, on 25 March 1860, the artillery units of the annexed territories were integrated into the Royal Sardinian Army: six field batteries, six fortress companies, and one workers company from the Tuscan Army, and nine field batteries, six fortress companies, and one workers company from the Emilian Army. The influx of artillery units and the growth of units in the runup to and during the war necessitated a new organization of the Piedmontese artillery, which at the time consisted of the Workers Regiment, the Fortress Artillery Regiment, the 1st Field Artillery Regiment, and the 2nd Field Artillery Regiment.

On 17 June 1860, which today is celebrated as the founding date of the Italian Army's Artillery Arm, four new regiments were ordered to be formed on 1 July 1860: the 3rd Regiment — Fortress Regiment, the 4th Regiment — Fortress Regiment, the 7th Regiment — Field Regiment, and the 8th Regiment — Field Regiment; while on the same day the Workers Regiment was to be renamed 1st Regiment — Workers Regiment, with the Fortress Artillery Regiment destined to become the 2nd Regiment — Fortress Regiment, and the 1st Field Artillery Regiment and 2nd Field Artillery Regiment, slated to be renamed 5th Regiment — Field Regiment and 6th Regiment — Field Regiment.

On 1 July 1860 the 3rd Regiment — Fortress Regiment was formed in Genoa and received eight fortress companies from the former Piedmontese Fortress Artillery Regiment, as well as two Tuscan fortress companies and one Emilian fortress company. One of the Piedmontese companies had participated in 1848 in the First Italian War of Independence and fought in the Battle of Pastrengo, where it earned a Bronze Medal of Military Valor, which was affixed to the regiment's flag and is depicted on the regiment's coat of arms. The same battery was also part of the Sardinian Expeditionary Corps, which was deployed to Crimea during the Crimean War in 1855–56.

After the annexation of the Kingdom of the Two Sicilies in 1861 the regiment moved from Genoa to Naples and in 1866 from Naples to Capua. The same year the regiment participated with three companies in the Third Italian War of Independence. In 1868 the regiment moved from Capu to Turin and in 1870 to Bologna. In September of the same year one of the regiment's companies participated in the capture of Rome. On 13 November 1870 the regiment was renamed 3rd Artillery Regiment and now fielded five fortress companies and eight field batteries. On 30 September 1873 the regiment ceded its remaining four fortress companies to help form the 12th Fortress Artillery Regiment. On 29 June 1882 the regiment was renamed 3rd Field Artillery Regiment.

On 1 November 1884 the regiment ceded two batteries to help from the 12th Field Artillery Regiment and on 1 November 1888 the regiment ceded eight batteries and one train company to help form the 15th Field Artillery Regiment. In 1895-96 the regiment provided three officers and 52 troops to augment units deployed to Eritrea for the First Italo-Ethiopian War. During the Italo-Turkish War in 1911-12 the regiment provided 14 officers and 403 troops to augment units deployed for the war. On 1 April 1912 the regiment ceded some of its personnel to help form the 2nd Heavy Field Artillery Regiment and on 1 January 1914 the regiment ceded its II Group to help form the 30th Field Artillery Regiment.

=== World War I ===
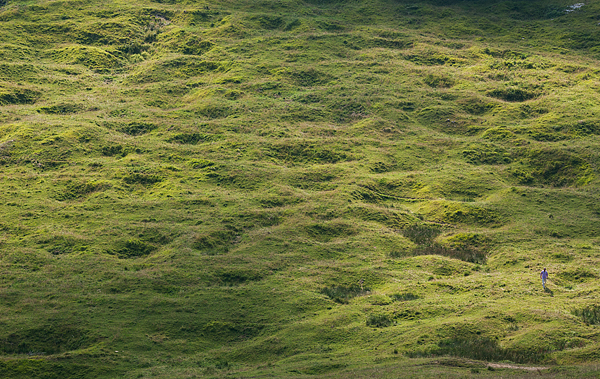
The flanks of Monte Valbella are still today pockmarked by thousands and artillery craters

At the outbreak of World War I the regiment was assigned to the VI Army Corps as the corps' artillery regiment. At the time the regiment consisted of a command, three groups with a combined eight batteries equipped with 75/27 mod. 11 field guns, and a depot. During the war the regiment's depot in Bologna formed the commands of the 39th Field Artillery Regiment and 13th Heavy Field Artillery Grouping. The depot also formed two heavy field howitzer groups, and ten heavy field cannon groups. During the war the regiment fought in 1915 in the Second Battle of the Isonzo on Podgora, and then on Podgora and Peuma during the Fourth Battle of the Isonzo. In 1916 the regiment was again on the two hills, before fighting in August in the Battle of Gorizia. The regiment was deployed in fall 1916 on the Monte San Marco and on Sober Hill for the Eighth Battle of the Isonzo. In November 1917 the regiment was transferred to the Asiago Plateau for the First Battle of Monte Grappa. In December 1917 the regiment was arrayed on Monte Sisemol and Monte Valbella, whose flanks are still today pockmarked by thousands and artillery craters. The next year the regiment was deployed on the Montello for the Second Battle of the Piave River and the Battle of Vittorio Veneto. After the war the regiment remained in Buttrio, near the battlefields of the war to recover materiel and equipment, before returning in 1920 to its base in Bologna.

In 1926 the regiment was assigned to the 16th Territorial Division of Bologna and consisted of a command, one group with 100/17 mod. 14 howitzers, two groups with 75/27 mod. 06 field guns, one group with mule-carried 75/13 mod. 15 mountain guns, and a depot. In January 1935 the 16th Territorial Division of Bologna was renamed 16th Infantry Division "Fossalta" and consequently the regiment was renamed 3rd Artillery Regiment "Fossalta". On 18 January 1936 the regiment's IV Group with 75/13 mod. 15 mountain guns was assigned to the 49th Artillery Regiment "Metauro II" for the Second Italo-Ethiopian War. The group returned from the war on 23 March 1937. In May 1939 the division was renamed 16th Infantry Division "Pistoia" and consequently the regiment was renamed 3rd Artillery Regiment "Pistoia" and on 3 September of the same year the regiment ceded its IV Group with 75/13 mod. 15 mountain guns to help reform the 37th Artillery Regiment "Cosseria" of the 5th Infantry Division "Cosseria".

=== World War II ===
On 10 June 1940, the day Italy entered World War II, the regiment consisted of a command, command unit, one group with 100/17 mod. 14 howitzers, two groups with 75/27 mod. 11 field guns, and an anti-aircraft battery with 20/65 mod. 35 anti-aircraft guns. The regiment was assigned to the 16th Infantry Division "Pistoia", which also included the 35th Infantry Regiment "Pistoia" and 36th Infantry Regiment "Pistoia".

In September 1941 the regiment was reorganized and motorized for a deployment to North Africa for the Western Desert campaign and now consisted of a command, command unit, the I and II groups with 100/17 mod. 14 howitzers, the III and IV groups with 75/27 mod. 06 field guns, and the X Anti-aircraft Group with 75/27 C.K. anti-aircraft guns on Lancia 1Z trucks. In September 1942 the division was transferred to North Africa and was tasked to guard the supply line of the Panzer Army Africa at El Alamein. After the Axis' defeat in the Second Battle of El Alamein the division retreated with the remains of the Panzer Army to Mareth in Tunisia. The division then participated in the Tunisian campaign, fighting in the Battle of the Mareth Line, the Battle of Wadi Akarit and then at Enfidaville. The division and its regiments surrendered to allied forces on 13 May 1943.

=== Cold War ===
On 1 January 1950 the 3rd Field Artillery Regiment was reformed in Gradisca d’Isonzo. The regiment was assigned to the Infantry Division "Mantova" and consisted of a command, a command unit, and three groups with QF 25-pounder field guns, one of which had been ceded by the 5th Field Artillery Regiment. On 1 January 1951 the Infantry Division "Mantova" included the following artillery regiments:

- Infantry Division "Mantova", in Gorizia
  - 3rd Field Artillery Regiment, in Gradisca d'Isonzo
  - 5th Field Artillery Regiment, in Palmanova
  - 18th Anti-tank Field Artillery Regiment, in Udine
  - 155th Field Artillery Regiment, in Udine
  - 4th Light Anti-aircraft Artillery Regiment, in Cervignano del Friuli

On 1 July 1951 the regiment received the II Light Anti-aircraft Group with 40/56 anti-aircraft autocannons from the 4th Light Anti-aircraft Artillery Regiment and disbanded its own III Group with QF 25-pounder field guns. The regiment was disbanded on 1 July 1953 and its personnel used to reform the 6th Mountain Artillery Regiment.

During the 1975 army reform the army disbanded the regimental level and newly independent battalions and groups were granted for the first time their own flags. On 21 October the 11th Field Artillery Regiment's III Self-propelled Group in Vercelli became an autonomous unit, was reorganized and renamed 3rd Field Artillery Group "Pastrengo". The group was named for the Battle of Pastrengo, where its 2nd Battery had earned a Bronze Medal of Military Valor on 30 April 1848. The group was assigned to the 3rd Mechanized Brigade "Goito" and consisted of a command, a command and services battery, and three batteries with M114 155 mm howitzers.

On 12 November 1976 the President of the Italian Republic Giovanni Leone assigned with decree 846 the flag and traditions of the 3rd Artillery Regiment "Pistoia" to the group. At the time the group fielded 485 men (37 officers, 58 non-commissioned officers, and 390 soldiers).

In 1982 the group received M109G 155 mm self-propelled howitzers and was renamed 3rd Self-propelled Field Artillery Group "Pastrengo".

=== Recent times ===
With the end of the Cold War the Italian Army began to draw down its forces and on 30 April 1991 the 3rd Self-propelled Field Artillery Group "Pastrengo" was placed in reserve status and on 29 May of the same year the flag of the 3rd Artillery Regiment "Pistoia" was transferred to the Shrine of the Flags in the Vittoriano in Rome.
