= 16th Infantry Division "Pistoia" =

16th Infantry Division "Pistoia"'
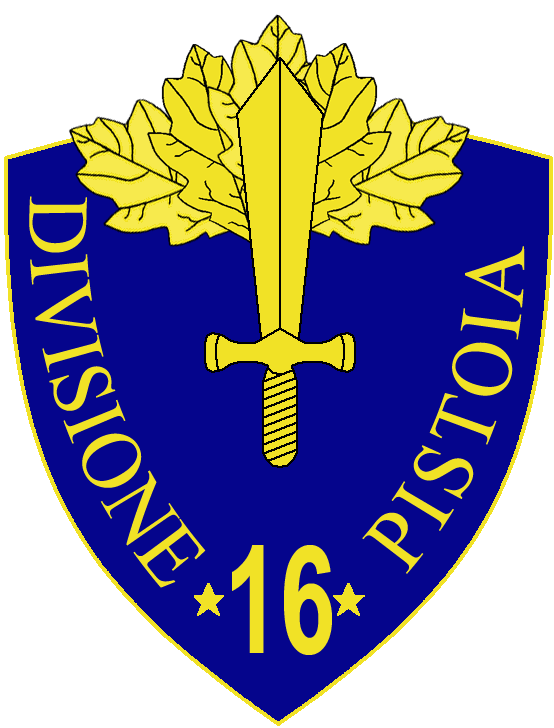
- 16th Infantry Division "Pistoia" insignia
- Active: 1940–1943
- Country: Kingdom of Italy
- Branch: Royal Italian Army
- Role: Infantry
- Size: Division
- Garrison/HQ: Bologna
- Engagements: World War II

Commanders
- Notable commanders: Giuseppe Falugi

Insignia
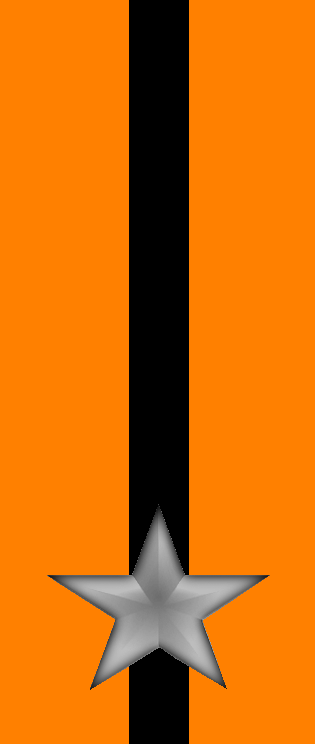
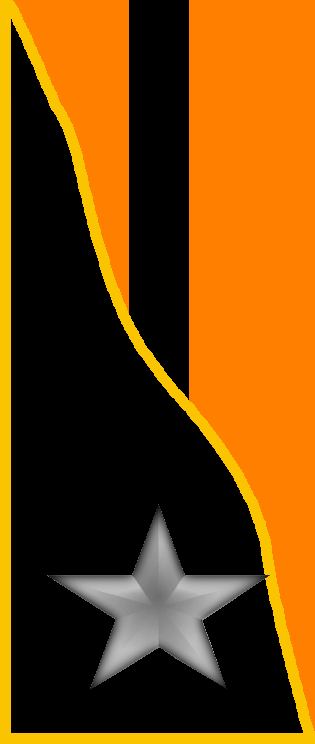
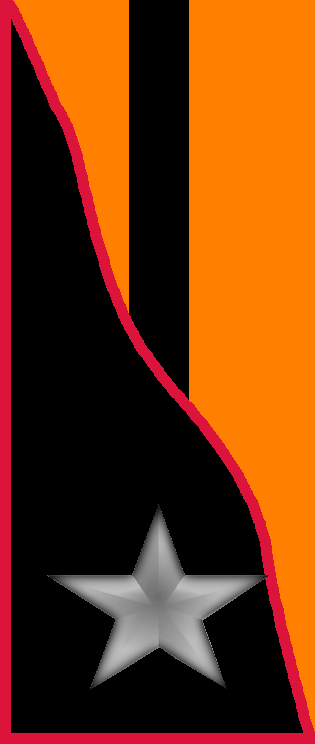
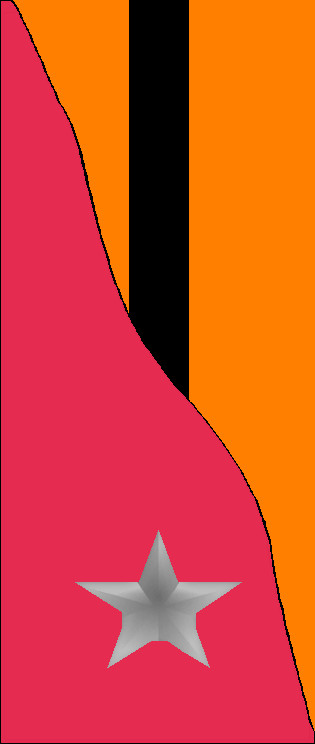
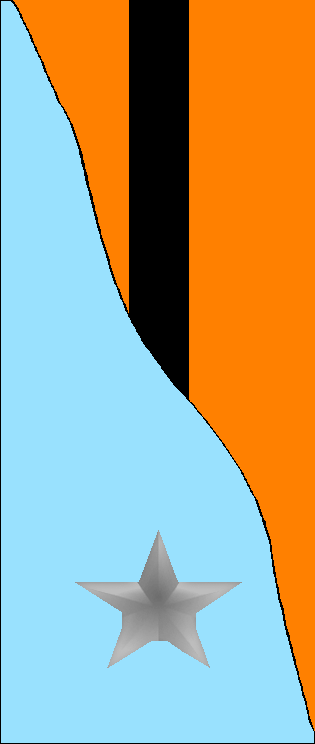
- Identification symbol: Pistoia Division gorget patches

The 16th Infantry Division "Pistoia" (Italian: 16ª Divisione di fanteria "Pistoia") was an infantry division of the Royal Italian Army during World War II. The division was named after the city of Pistoia and initially an infantry division, but reorganized to a fully motorized division in 1941. Consequently on 10 October 1941 the division was renamed 16th Motorized Division "Pistoia" (Italian: 16ª Divisione motorizzata "Pistoia"). The Pistoia had its recruiting area in the central Emilia-Romagna and its headquarters in Bologna. Its two infantry regiments were based in Bologna (35th) and Modena (36th), with the division's artillery regiment based in Bologna.

== History ==
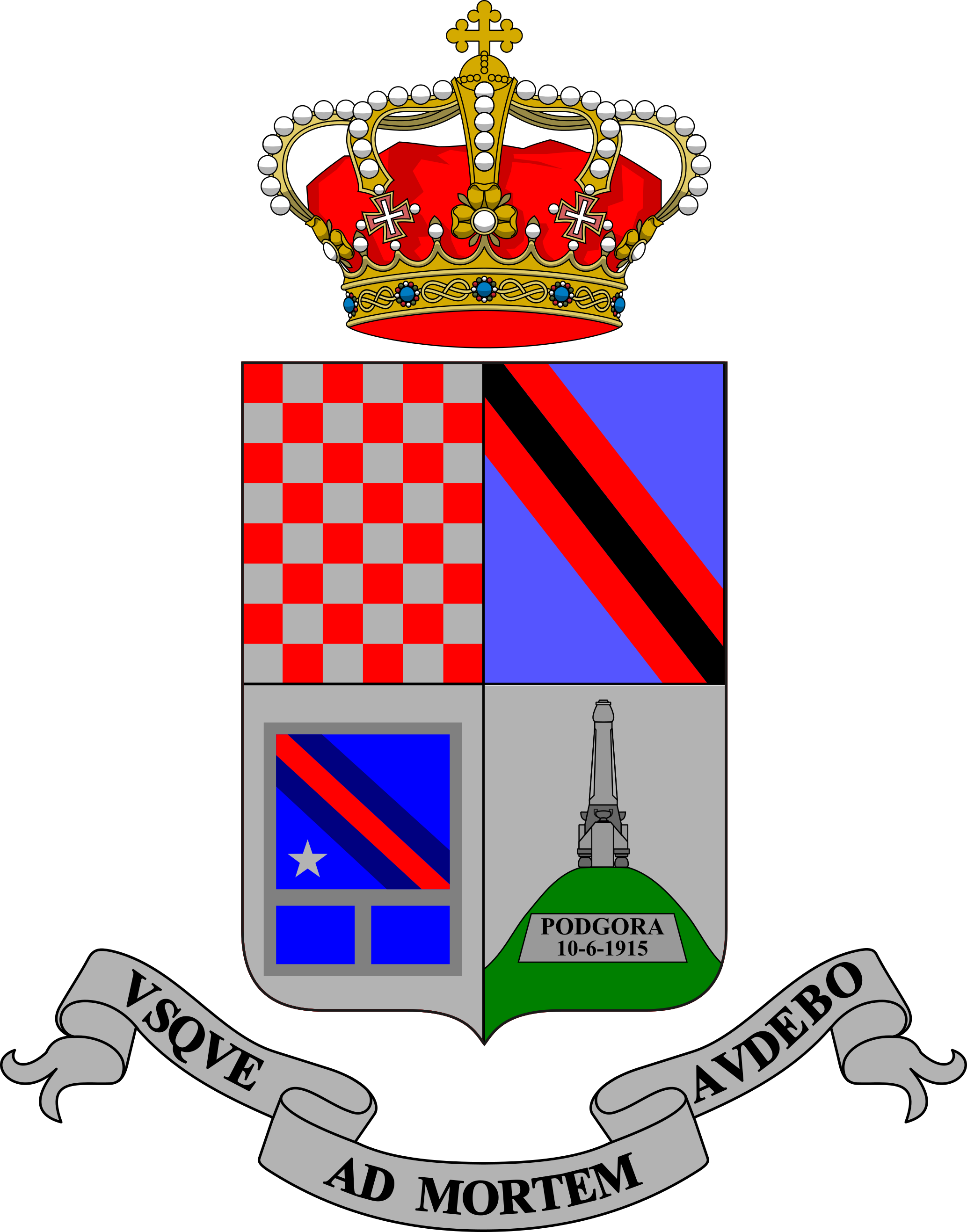
Coat of Arms of the 35h Infantry Regiment "Pistoia", 1939

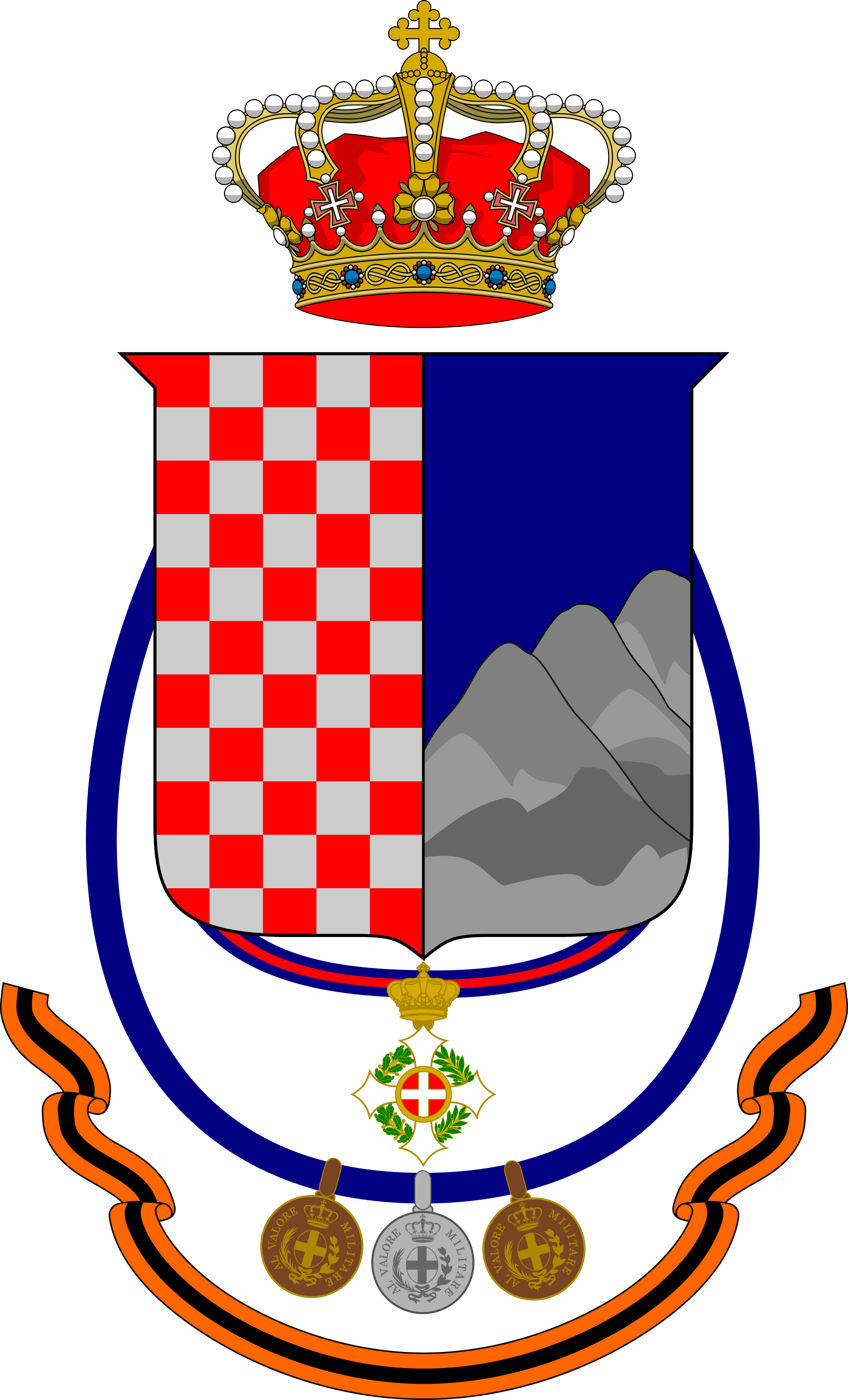
Coat of Arms of the 35th Infantry Regiment "Pistoia", 1940

The division's lineage begins with the Brigade "Pistoia" established by order of the Provisional Government of the Grand Duchy of Tuscany of 4 November 1859 with the 7th and 8th infantry regiments. On 25 March 1860 the Brigade "Pistoia" entered the Royal Sardinian Army three days after the Kingdom of Sardinia had annexed the United Provinces of Central Italy, which included the Grand Duchy of Tuscany. Already before entering the Royal Sardinian Army the brigade's two infantry regiments had been renumbered on 30 December 1859 as 35th Infantry Regiment and 36th Infantry Regiment.

=== World War I ===
The brigade fought on the Italian front in World War I. On 20 October 1926 the brigade assumed the name of XVI Infantry Brigade with the 35th Infantry Regiment "Pistoia", and 36th Infantry Regiment "Pistoia", and 66th Infantry Regiment "Valtellina". The brigade was the infantry component of the 16th Territorial Division of Bologna, which also included the 3rd Artillery Regiment. In 1934 the division changed its name to 16th Infantry Division "Fossalta". On 1 November 1936 the division ceded the 66th Infantry Regiment to the 8th Infantry Division "Po" and on 2 May 1937 the division raised in Reggio Emilia the 80th Infantry Regiment "Roma" as replacement. In 1939 the XVI Infantry Brigade was dissolved and the 80th Infantry Regiment "Roma" transferred to the 9th Infantry Division "Pasubio". The remaining two infantry regiments came under direct command of the division, which changed its name to 16th Infantry Division "Pistoia".

=== World War II ===
==== Invasion of France ====
In June 1940 the Pistoia was located in the Varaita Valley on the border with France as reserve of the 1st Army for the Italian invasion of France. On 20 June 1940 the Pistoia moved to the Maddalena Pass, with only the division's artillery regiment ending up in French territory by July 1940.

==== North African Campaign ====
On 15 January 1941 the division was transferred to Calabria and tasked with coastal defense. In September 1941, the Pistoia was reorganized as a motorized division and, on 19 October 1941, the division was renamed 16th Motorized Division "Pistoia". In September 1942 the division was transferred to North Africa and took positions on the Bardia-Sallum-Naqb al Halfayah road, guarding the supply line of the Panzer Army Africa at El Alamein. Already in late September and October the division received the three battalions of the 336th Infantry Regiment "Piceno" of the 152nd Infantry Division "Piceno" to bring it back up to strength.

- I Battalion/ 336th Infantry Regiment "Piceno" became the III Battalion/ 35th Infantry Regiment "Pistoia"
- II Battalion/ 336th Infantry Regiment "Piceno" became the I Battalion/ 36th Infantry Regiment "Pistoia"
- III Battalion/ 336th Infantry Regiment "Piceno" became the III Battalion/ 36th Infantry Regiment "Pistoia"

The Pistoia had to retreat when the British offensive reached it on 11 November 1942 after the British success in the Second Battle of El Alamein. After a long retreat Axis forces were able to re-establish a defensive line at Mareth in Tunisia on 4 February 1943. On 6 March 1943 the Axis forces commenced the Battle of Medenine in an attempt to disrupt British offensive preparations. After the failure at the Battle of Medenine the Axis forces, including the Pistoia, fell back to the Mareth Line. When the British resumed their offensive in the Battle of the Mareth Line the Pistoia held its positions until 25 March 1943, but when threatened of being outflanked it was forced to retreated northwards to El Hamma. The Pistoia fought in the Battle of Wadi Akarit and once again the Axis forces had to retreat northwards. By the time the Pistoia reached the last Axis line at Enfidaville on 13 April 1943 it was severely decimated. On 22 April 1943 the allies began their final offensive in Tunisia and after a few days, despite some successful counter-attacks west of the Takrouna road junction, the Pistoia was surrounded. The last of the division's units surrendered on 13 May 1943.

== Organization ==
=== 16th Infantry Division "Pistoia ===
16th Infantry Division "Pistoia" organization in 1940

- 16th Infantry Division "Pistoia", in Bologna
  - Headquarters
    - Command Company
    - 76th Carabinieri Section
    - 1 × Carabinieri Section
    - 76th Field Post Office
    - 16th Infantry Division Command Transport Squad
  - 35th Infantry Regiment "Pistoia", in Bologna
    - Command Company
    - 3 × Fusilier battalions
    - Support Weapons Battery (65/17 mod. 13 infantry support guns)
    - Mortar Company (81mm mod. 35 mortars)
  - 36th Infantry Regiment "Pistoia", in Modena
    - Command Company
    - 3 × Fusilier battalions
    - Support Weapons Battery (65/17 mod. 13 infantry support guns)
    - Mortar Company (81mm mod. 35 mortars)
  - 3rd Artillery Regiment "Pistoia", in Bologna
    - Command Unit
    - I Group (100/17 mod. 14 howitzers)
    - II Group (100/17 mod. 14 howitzers; joined the regiment in September 1941)
    - II Group (75/27 mod. 11 field guns; renumbered III Group in September 1941)
    - III Group (75/27 mod. 11 field guns; renumbered IV Group in September 1941)
    - X Anti-aircraft Group (joined the regiment in September 1941)
      - 2 × batteries (75/27 C.K. anti-aircraft guns on Lancia 1Z trucks)
    - 116th Anti-aircraft Battery (20/65 mod. 35 anti-aircraft guns; entered the X Anti-aircraft Group in September 1941)
    - Ammunition and Supply Unit
  - XVI Mortar Battalion (81mm mod. 35 mortars)
  - 16th Telegraph and Radio Operators Company (entered the CXVI Mixed Engineer Battalion in 1942)
  - 44th Engineer Company (entered the CXVI Mixed Engineer Battalion in 1942)
  - 16th Anti-tank Company (47/32 mod. 35 anti-tank guns; entered the XVI Anti-tank Battalion in 1942)
  - 111th Medical Section
    - 70th Field Hospital
    - 71st Field Hospital
    - 871st Field Hospital
    - 1 × Surgical Unit
  - 16th Autocarrette Section
  - 120th Supply Section
  - 210th Transport Section

Attached in 1940 for the invasion of France:

- LXXIX CC.NN. Battalion

Attached in 1941:

- 63rd CC.NN. Legion "Tagliamento"
  - Command Company
  - LXIII CC.NN. Battalion
  - LXXIX CC.NN. Battalion
  - 63rd CC.NN. Machine Gun Company

=== 16th Motorized Division "Pistoia" ===
16th Motorized Division "Pistoia" organization in 1942

- 16th Motorized Division "Pistoia", in Bologna
  - Headquarters
    - Command Company
    - 76th Carabinieri Section
    - 76th Field Post Office (replaced by the 96th Field Post Office in January 1943)
    - 16th Motorized Division Command Transport Squad
  - 35th Motorized Infantry Regiment "Pistoia", in Bologna
    - Command Company
    - 2 × Fusilier battalions
    - Support Weapons Battalion
    - Mortar Company (81mm mod. 35 mortars)
  - 36th Motorized Infantry Regiment "Pistoia", in Modena
    - Command Company
    - 2 × Fusilier battalions
    - Support Weapons Battalion
    - Mortar Company (81mm mod. 35 mortars)
  - 3rd Artillery Regiment "Pistoia", in Bologna
    - Command Unit
    - I Group (100/17 mod. 14 howitzers)
    - II Group (100/17 mod. 14 howitzers; joined the regiment in September 1941)
    - II Group (75/27 mod. 11 field guns; renumbered III Group in September 1941)
    - III Group (75/27 mod. 11 field guns; renumbered IV Group in September 1941)
    - X Anti-aircraft Group (joined the regiment in September 1941)
      - 2 × batteries (75/27 C.K. anti-aircraft guns on Lancia 1Z trucks)
    - 116th Anti-aircraft Battery (20/65 mod. 35 anti-aircraft guns; entered the X Anti-aircraft Group in September 1941)
    - Ammunition and Supply Unit
  - XVI Anti-tank Battalion
  - XVI Replacements Battalion
  - CXVI Mixed Engineer Battalion (formed in 1942, replaced by the LI Mixed Engineer Battalion in 1943)
    - 16th Telegraph and Radio Operators Company (entered the CXVI Mixed Engineer Battalion in 1942)
    - 44th Engineer Company (entered the CXVI Mixed Engineer Battalion in 1942)
    - 1 × Searchlight Section
  - 155th Armored Reconnaissance Company
  - 111th Medical Section
    - 70th Field Hospital
    - 71st Field Hospital
    - 871st Field Hospital
    - 1 × Surgical Unit
  - 120th Supply Section
  - 210th Transport Section
  - 237th Transport Section

Attached during the Tunisian campaign in 1942-43:

- CCCL Machine Gun Battalion
- XXXI Mixed Engineer Battalion, 131st Armored Division "Centauro"
- CCCXXXII Motorized Artillery Group (100/17 mod. 14 howitzers)
- CCCXXXV Motorized Artillery Group (149/12 howitzers)

== Commanding officers ==
The division's commanding officers were:

16th Infantry Division "Pistoia":

- Generale di Divisione Mario Priore (1 September 1939 - 15 July 1940)
- Generale di Brigata Egidio Levis (16 July 1940 - 21 November 1940)
- Colonel Luigi Ottone (acting, 22 November 1940 - 18 December 1940)
- Generale di Divisione Guglielmo Negro (19 December 1940 - 9 October 1941)

16th Motorized Division "Pistoia":

- Generale di Divisione Guglielmo Negro (10 October 1941 - 20 July 1942)
- Generale di Brigata Giuseppe Falugi (21 July 1942 - 13 May 1943)
