= Alec Wilfred Lee =

British army general

Major-General Alec Wilfred Lee CB MC
- Born: 20 August 1896
- Died: 5 July 1973 (aged 76)
- Military career
- Allegiance: United Kingdom
- Branch: British Army
- Service years: 1914–1947
- Rank: Major-General
- Service number: 22040
- Units: South Staffordshire Regiment; Royal Irish Fusiliers; Staffordshire Regiment
- Commands: 133rd Infantry Brigade (1942–43)
- Conflicts: First World War; Second World War
- Awards: Companion of the Order of the Bath; Military Cross; Mentioned in Despatches (7)

Major-General Alec Wilfred Lee, CB, MC (20 August 1896 – 5 July 1973) was a British Army officer who served in both world wars. During the Second World War, he commanded the 133rd Infantry Brigade and later served as Deputy Head of the British Army Staff in Washington, D.C.

== Military career ==
Born in 1896, Lee was initially educated at Clifton College. He saw service in the First World War, where he was commissioned as an officer into the South Staffordshire Regiment of the British Army in 1914. This was followed by seeing active service on the Western Front, where he was awarded the Military Cross in 1915, and mentioned in despatches six times throughout the war.

Remaining in the army during the interwar period, Lee received a promotion to captain in 1923 and went to India where he attended the Staff College, Quetta, from 1926 to 1927. After this, he went to England to serve as an instructor at the Staff College, Camberley, for the next four years. In 1937 he transferred to the Royal Irish Fusiliers and, two years later, received a promotion to colonel and experienced the death of his wife.

Lee served in the Second World War, initially as a staff officer with General Headquarters of the British Expeditionary Force in France, for which he was mentioned in despatches another time. After serving from late to 1940 until 1942 in the War Office in London as deputy director of Staff Duties, Lee, by now a brigadier, took command of the 44th (Home Counties) Division's 133rd Infantry Brigade until it was disbanded in 1943. In 1944 he was sent to India where he was major-general in command of Formation Training until later that year when he was sent to the United States to be Deputy Head of the British Army Staff in Washington, D.C.

Lee remained in this post until 1947, during which time he also served as aide-de-camp to the King, until he retired from the army, and was remarried, that same year, after well over thirty years of service. From 1954 to 1959 he was Colonel Commandant of his old regiment, the South Staffords, as well as Colonel of the Staffordshire Regiment, formed by the merger of the South Staffords with the North Staffordshire Regiment, from 1959 to 1961. In addition to being a keen sportsman, he also wrote pieces for the Encyclopædia Britannica and married again, for the third time, in 1970.

== Bibliography ==
- Smart, Nick (2005). Biographical Dictionary of British Generals of the Second World War. Barnesley: Pen & Sword. ISBN 1844150496.
