= 133rd Infantry Brigade (United Kingdom) =

Kent Brigade 133rd (Kent) Brigade 133rd Infantry Brigade
- Active: 1908–1943
- Country: United Kingdom
- Branch: Territorial Army
- Type: Infantry
- Size: Brigade
- Engagements: Dunkirk evacuation Western Desert Campaign

The 133rd Infantry Brigade was an infantry brigade of the British Army that saw service during the First World War in British India, but never as a complete formation. In the Second World War, the brigade fought in the Battle of France in May 1940 and was evacuated at Dunkirk. It later fought in the North African Campaign, and was disbanded on 1 January 1943.

== Formation ==
After the creation of the Territorial Force in 1908, four Volunteer battalions from Kent were organised into a brigade, the Kent Brigade, within the Home Counties Division. Two, the 4th and 5th, were of the Buffs (East Kent Regiment) and the other two, the 4th and 5th (The Weald of Kent), of the Queen's Own (Royal West Kent Regiment).

== First World War ==
On the outbreak of the First World War, the men of the division accepted liability for overseas service to relieve Regular troops for the fighting fronts. The division was ordered to British India, although the brigade staffs and Regular adjutants of the battalions were to remain behind. The Home Counties Division embarked at Southampton and sailed on 30 October 1914, disembarking at Bombay on 1–3 December.

=== Service in India ===
On arrival, the division's units were sent distributed to various peacetime stations across India, Aden and Burma to continue their training for war. 4th Buffs served at Aden from 4 August 1915 to 28 January 1916.

The TF battalions had all taken the prefix '1' (1/4th Buffs etc) to distinguish them from their 2nd-Line battalions forming in the United Kingdom, and in May 1915, the division was numbered 44th (Home Counties) Division, and the brigade formally became 133rd (Kent) Brigade (though without a commander or staff, and with its battalions scattered). (Note: 133rd Brigade was originally authorised as part of 44th Division in March 1915 and consisted of 'Kitchener's Army' battalions. They were renumbered 112th Brigade and 37th Division on 12 April 1915 and the original numbers were later reassigned to the Kent Brigade and Home Counties Division.) The 2nd Line units became 202nd (2/1st Kent) Brigade, part of 67th (2nd Home Counties) Division.

From 1915 onwards there was a regular drain on the battalions as they lost their best Non-Commissioned Officers for officer training, sent detachments to various places in India, and provided drafts to replace casualties among units fighting in Mesopotamia. 1/5th Buffs landed at Basra on 6 December 1915 and joined 14th Indian Division in Mesopotamia.

By early 1916 it had become obvious that the Territorial Divisions in India were never going to be able to reform and return to Europe to reinforce the Western Front as had been originally intended. They continued training in India for the rest of the war, providing drafts and detachments as required. 1/5th Royal West Kents was transferred to Mesopotamia at the end of 1917, landing at Basra on 11 December and joining 54th Indian Brigade, 18th Indian Division.

After the war ended, the remaining Territorial units in India were gradually reduced, but 1/4th Royal West Kents finally saw active service during the Third Afghan War.

=== Order of Battle ===
During the First World War the Kent Brigade was composed as follows:

Commander: Brigadier-General L. Combe (remained in the United Kingdom)

- 4th Battalion, Buffs (East Kent Regiment) (from Canterbury)
- 5th (The Weald of Kent) Battalion, Buffs (East Kent Regiment) (from Ashford) (left December 1915)
- 4th Battalion, Queen's Own (Royal West Kent Regiment) (from Tonbridge) (left January 1916)
- 5th Battalion, Queen's Own (Royal West Kent Regiment) (from Bromley) (left December 1917)

== Between the wars ==
The Territorial Force was disbanded shortly after the end of the war. It did, however, start to reform in early 1920 and was later renamed the Territorial Army. The Home Counties Division was reformed as the 44th (Home Counties) Division and the brigade was reformed as the 133rd (Kent) Infantry Brigade and again included two battalions of the Buffs (Royal East Kent Regiment) and two of the Queen's Own Royal West Kent Regiment.

The brigade saw many changes throughout the inter-war years. In 1921 the 4th and 5th (The Weald of Kent) battalions of the Buffs were amalgamated as the 4th/5th Battalion, Buffs. In the same year the 5th QORWKR were transferred to the 132nd (Middlesex and Kent) Infantry Brigade. They were replaced in the brigade by the 4th and 5th (Cinque Ports) battalions of the Royal Sussex Regiment, both previously having been attached to the division for training. In 1938 all infantry brigades of the British Army were reduced from four battalions to three and so the 4th QORWKR was also transferred to the 132nd Brigade.

== Second World War ==
The brigade and division, along with the rest of the Territorial Army, were mobilised in late August 1939, due to the deteriorating situation in Europe and, on 1 September 1939, the German Army marched into Poland. Britain and France declared war on Germany two days later, 3 September 1939, beginning the Second World War.

Upon mobilisation in the early stages of the war in September 1939, 133rd Brigade HQ with 4th Battalion, Royal Sussex Regiment became HQ Western Sub-Area in the United Kingdom while the other units of the brigade were temporarily under the command of other formations. The brigade reassembled in 44th (Home Counties) Infantry Division on 7 October 1939. The 4th Battalion, Buffs (Royal East Kent Regiment) was quickly posted away to 25th Brigade, being replaced by the 2nd Battalion, Royal Sussex Regiment, a Regular Army unit, making the brigade an all-Royal Sussex formation. Before the war, the 2nd Battalion, Royal Sussex Regiment had been serving in Northern Ireland, under command of Northern Ireland District.

=== Order of Battle ===
133rd Brigade was constituted as follows:

- 4th Battalion, Buffs (Royal East Kent Regiment) (until 31 December 1939, to 25th Brigade)
- 4th Battalion, Royal Sussex Regiment
- 5th (Cinque Ports) Battalion, Royal Sussex Regiment
- 2nd Battalion, Royal Sussex Regiment (from 20 December 1939)
- 133rd Infantry Brigade Anti-Tank Company (formed 2 January 1940, disbanded 8 January 1941)

=== Commanders ===
The following officers commanded the 133rd Infantry Brigade during the war:

- Brigadier N.I. Whitty (until 19 June 1940)
- Brigadier E.C. Beard (from 19 June 1940 until 6 March 1942)
- Lieutenant-Colonel J.J. McCully (acting, from 6 to 8 March 1942)
- Lieutenant-Colonel K.C. Hooper (Acting, from 8 to 10 March 1942)
- Lieutenant-Colonel L.G. Whistler (Acting, from 10 March until 1 April 1942, again from 24 August 1942)
- Brigadier A.W. Lee (from 3 September 1942)

=== Service ===
Commanded by Brigadier N.I. Whitty, the 133rd Brigade was sent to France with the rest of 44th Division as part of the British Expeditionary Force (BEF), landing on 9 April 1940. The brigade saw fighting in the St Omer-La Bassée area during the Battle of France (23–29 May) and retreated to Dunkirk, where they were then evacuated from on 30 May 1940.

Back in the United Kingdom, 133rd Brigade was re-equipped and reformed in numbers as all units had suffered heavy casualties (5th Royal Sussex had suffered 354 casualties, nearly half their strength) and had to be brought back up to their War Establishment strengths with large numbers of conscripted men. The 133rd Brigade was positioned in Southeast England to defend what 44th Division's commander, Major-General Brian Horrocks, regarded as 'the No 1 German invasion area, stretching from the Isle of Thanet to Dover and on to Folkestone'.

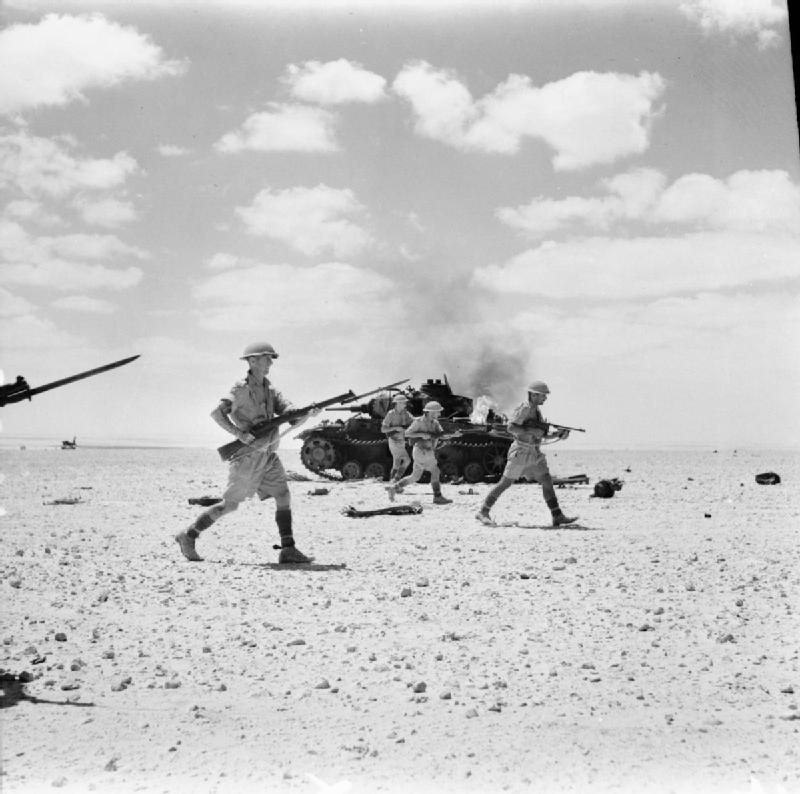
Posed shot of men of the Royal Sussex Regiment advancing with fixed bayonets past a burning German PzKpfw III tank, 15 September 1942.

In May 1942 the brigade was sent to North Africa with the rest of the 44th Division, now under Major-General Ivor Hughes, where it fought at the Battle of Alam el Halfa. After Alam Halfa, 133rd Brigade was converted to a lorried infantry brigade, assigned first to 8th Armoured Division and then to 10th Armoured Division with which it fought at the Second Battle of El Alamein, transferring briefly to Major-General Douglas Wimberley's 51st (Highland) Infantry Division. After El Alamein the brigade's battalions were posted away on 31 December and 133rd Brigade was officially disbanded on 15 January 1943. The 4th and 5th (Cinque Ports) Battalions were then merged to become the 4th/5th Battalion and with the 2nd Battalion were then posted to the 6th Indian Infantry Division, the 4th/5th posted to the 27th Indian Infantry Brigade, the 2nd posted to the 24th Indian Infantry Brigade. However, neither unit saw combat again and both these battalions remained in Iraq and Palestine for the rest of the war.

== Post-War ==
The brigade was reformed again after the war, as the 133rd (Kent and Sussex) Infantry Brigade, when the Territorial Army was reorganised in 1947. The brigade was now composed of three amalgamated battalions: the 4th/5th Battalion, Buffs (Royal East Kent Regiment), 4th/5th Battalion, Royal Sussex Regiment (which absorbed the duplicate 6th Battalion) and 4th/5th Battalion, Queen's Own Royal West Kent Regiment.

== Bibliography ==
- Maj A.F. Becke, History of the Great War: Order of Battle of Divisions, Part 2a: The Territorial Force Mounted Divisions and the 1st-Line Territorial Force Divisions (42–56), London: HM Stationery Office, 1935/Uckfield: Naval & Military Press, 2007, ISBN 1-84734-739-8.
- Maj A.F. Becke, History of the Great War: Order of Battle of Divisions, Part 3b: New Army Divisions (30–41) and 63rd (R.N.) Division, London: HM Stationery Office, 1939/Uckfield: Naval & Military Press, 2007, ISBN 1-84734-741-X.
- Lt-Gen Sir Brian Horrocks, A Full Life, London: Collins, 1960.
- Lt-Col H.F. Joslen, Orders of Battle, United Kingdom and Colonial Formations and Units in the Second World War, 1939–1945, London: HM Stationery Office, 1960/London: London Stamp Exchange, 1990, ISBN 0-948130-03-2/Uckfield: Naval & Military Press, 2003, ISBN 1-84342-474-6.
- Brian Robson, Crisis on the Frontier: The Third Afghan War and the Campaign in Waziristan 1919–20, Staplehurst: Spellmount, 2004, ISBN 1-862272-11-5.
- Fraser, David (1999) [1983]. And We Shall Shock Them: The British Army in the Second World War. Cassell military. ISBN 978-0-304-35233-3.
