= John Cecil Currie =

British Army officer

Brigadier John Cecil Currie DSO** MC
- Born: 1898; Westerham, England
- Died: 26 June 1944 (aged 45–46); Normandy, France
- Burial place: Bayeux Commonwealth War Graves Commission Cemetery
- Military career
- Allegiance: United Kingdom
- Branch: British Army
- Service years: 1914–1944
- Rank: Brigadier
- Service number: 11446
- Units: Royal Field Artillery; Royal Artillery
- Commands: A Battery, Royal Horse Artillery; 2nd Field Regiment, Royal Artillery; 4th Regiment, Royal Horse Artillery; 9th Armoured Brigade; 4th Armoured Brigade
- Conflicts: First World War; Second World War: Battle of France; Battle of Sidi Rezegh; Second Battle of El Alamein; Allied invasion of Sicily; Battle of Normandy
- Awards: Distinguished Service Order & Two Bars; Military Cross

Brigadier John Cecil Currie DSO** MC (1898 – 26 June 1944) was a British Army officer who fought in both the First and the Second World Wars.

As commander of the 9th Armoured Brigade, he played a key role in the allied breakout from the town of El Alamein in what was to become the Second Battle of El Alamein in November 1942. He was killed in Normandy, France while leading the 4th Armoured Brigade in battle.

== Early life ==
John Cecil Currie was born at Westerham in 1898, the son of Brigadier General Arthur Cecil Currie (1863–1942), CB CMG JP, Royal Artillery, and his wife, Amy Haggard.

== Military career ==
=== Early career ===
Educated at Cheltenham College and the Royal Military Academy, Woolwich, Currie was commissioned into the Royal Field Artillery on 22 April 1915. He served in Mesopotamia in the First World War for which he was awarded the Military Cross.

He remained in the army during the interwar period, and, in the autumn of 1939 he was deployed to France with 2nd Field Regiment Royal Artillery, part of the British Expeditionary Force (BEF) and then took part in the Dunkirk evacuation in June 1940. He then commanded the 4th Regiment Royal Horse Artillery at the Battle of Sidi Rezegh in November 1941 for which he was appointed a Companion of the Distinguished Service Order.

=== Second Battle of El Alemain ===
In April 1942 Currie became commander of 9th Armoured Brigade. In November 1942, on orders from Bernard Freyberg, General Officer Commanding 2nd New Zealand Division, he led the spearhead for the allied breakout from the town of El Alamein in what was to become the Second Battle of El Alamein.

We all realise that for armour to attack a wall of guns sounds like another Balaclava, it is properly an infantry job. But there are no more infantry available. So our armour must do it.

— Lieutenant General Sir Bernard Freyberg

Currie had tried to get the brigade out of doing this job stating that he believed the brigade would be attacking on too wide a front with no reserves and that they would suffer 50 per cent losses.

The reply came from Freyberg that Montgomery

...was aware of the risk and has accepted the possibility of losing 100% casualties in 9th Armoured Brigade to make the break, but in view of the promise of immediate following through of 1st Armoured Division, the risk was not considered as great as all that.

The 9th Armoured Brigade started its approach march at 8 pm on 1 November 1942 from El Alamein railway station with around 130 tanks; it arrived at its start line with only 94 tanks. The brigade was to have started its attack towards Tel el Aqqaqir at 5.45a.m. behind a barrage; however, the attack was postponed for 30 minutes while the brigade regrouped on Currie's orders. At 6.15 am, half an hour before dawn, the three regiments of the brigade advanced towards the gun line.

The German and Italian anti-tank guns opened fire upon the advancing tanks silhouetted by the rising sun using mostly Pak38 and Italian 47mm guns, along with 24 of the formidable 88mm flak guns. The brigade had started the attack with 94 tanks and was reduced to only 24 runners (although many were recoverable) and of the 400 tank crew involved in the attack 230 were killed, wounded or captured.

After the attack, Brigadier William Gentry, commanding the 6th New Zealand Brigade went ahead to survey the scene. On seeing Currie asleep on a stretcher, he approached him saying, "Sorry to wake you John, but I'd like to know where your tanks are?" Currie waved his hand at a group of tanks around him, replying "There they are". Gentry was puzzled. "I don't mean your headquarters tanks, I mean your armoured regiments. Where are they?" Currie waved his arm and again replied, "There are my armoured regiments, Bill".

The brigade had sacrificed itself upon the gun line and caused great damage but had failed to create the gap for the 1st Armoured Division to pass through, the attack as expected brought down the weight of the German and Italian tank reserve. At 11:00 a.m. on 2 November the remains of 15th Panzer, 21st Panzer and Littorio Armoured Divisions counter-attacked 1st Armoured Division and the remains of 9th Armoured Brigade, which by that time had dug in with a screen of anti-tank guns, artillery and massed air support. The counter-attack failed under a blanket of shells and bombs, resulting in a loss of about 100 tanks.

=== North West Europe ===
Currie became commander of 4th Armoured Brigade in February 1943. He led his brigade in the Normandy landings on 7 June 1944 but was killed when German shellfire hit his position on 26 June 1944.

== Family ==
On 9 December 1926 he married Marianne Charlotte Blackburn.

== Bibliography ==
- Barr, Niall (2005) [2004]. Pendulum of War: The Three Battles of El Alamein. Woodstock, NY: Overlook Press. ISBN 978-1-58567-738-2.
- Lucas-Phillips, C. E. (1962). Alamein. London: Heinemann. OCLC 3510044.
- Playfair, Major-General I. S. O.; et al. (2004) [1st. pub. HMSO 1966]. Butler, J. R. M. (ed.). The Mediterranean and Middle East: The Destruction of the Axis Forces in Africa. History of the Second World War United Kingdom Military Series. Vol. IV (Naval & Military Press ed.). London: HMSO. ISBN 1-84574-068-8.
- Walker, Ronald (1967). Alam Halfa and Alamein. The Official History of New Zealand in the Second World War 1939–1945. Wellington, NZ: Historical Publications Branch. OCLC 893102.
- Watson, Bruce Allen (2007) [1999]. Exit Rommel: The Tunisian Campaign, 1942–43. Mechanicsburg, PA: Stackpole. ISBN 978-0-8117-3381-6.
