= Giuseppe Falugi =

Italian general

- Born: 1 July 1886; Chianni, Kingdom of Italy
- Died: 1962 (age 76); Rome , Italy
- Military career
- Allegiance: Kingdom of Italy
- Branch: Royal Italian Army
- Service years: 1911–1945
- Rank: Major General
- Commands: 213th Infantry Regiment; 84th Infantry Regiment "Venezia"; 16th Infantry Division Pistoia
- Conflicts: First Italo-Senussi War; World War I; Battle of Caporetto; Second Battle of the Piave River; Battle of Vittorio Veneto; World War II; Western Desert campaign; Tunisian campaign; Battle of the Mareth Line; Battle of Wadi Akarit; Battle of Enfidaville
- Awards: Silver Medal of Military Valor (three times); Bronze Medal of Military Valor; War Cross for Military Valor; Military Order of Savoy; Order of the Crown of Italy

Giuseppe Falugi (1 July 1886 – 1962) was an Italian general during World War II.

== Biography ==
He was born in Chianni, province of Pisa, in the small hamlet of Rivalto, on 1 July 1886. In 1907 he entered the Royal Infantry and Cavalry Military Academy of Modena, graduating with the rank of infantry second lieutenant on 17 September 1911. He was then sent to Libya with the 26th Infantry Regiment, and on 16 May 1913 he distinguished himself in combat at Sidi Garbaa (south of Derna), being awarded the Silver Medal of Military Valor.

During the First World War he was promoted to lieutenant, then to captain and finally to major. Fighting with the 25th Infantry Regiment of the "Bergamo" Infantry Brigade, he participated in the battle of Caporetto, the second battle of the Piave and the battle of Vittorio Veneto. Altogether, during the war he was awarded two more silver medals, a Bronze Medal of Military Valor and a War Cross for Military Valor.

On 16 January 1935 he was promoted to colonel; in 1935-1936 he commanded the 213th Infantry Regiment, and in 1937-1938 the 84th Infantry Regiment "Venezia". Between 1938 and 1939 he was Chief of Staff of the Gavinana Infantry Division, headquartered in Florence.

On 10 August 1939, he became Inspector-General of officers at the Ministry of War, holding this post until 14 April 1941. In the meantime, on 1 January 1940, he had been promoted to brigadier general. From 15 April 1941 he was assigned to the territorial defense of Udine for special assignments.

On 1 August 1941 he was appointed commander of the divisional infantry of the 16th Infantry Division Pistoia, stationed in Calabria, and then became divisional commander on 20 July 1942, replacing General Guglielmo Negro. Under his command the "Pistoia" was transferred to Greece and then, after having been reorganized as an AS-type auto-transportable infantry division, to Egypt in September 1942.

Kept in reserve during the second battle of El Alamein, as it was deemed not yet combat ready, the Division was attacked by the advancing Eighth Army on 11 November and forced to retreat to Tripolitania and then to Tunisia along with the rest of Panzer Army Africa. Falugi commanded the Division throughout the Tunisian campaign, participating in the battles of the Mareth Line, of Wadi Akarit and of Enfidaville. He was promoted to major general for war merit on 26 April 1943 and captured by the British with the final surrender of all Axis forces in Tunisia, on 13 May 1943. He was then held as a prisoner of war at the Wilton Park Estate, near London, till the end of the war, returning to Italy in June 1945.

On 26 October 1945 he was awarded the honor of Knight of the Military Order of Italy. From 1946 he was director-general of the officers' personnel of the Ministry of War. He died in 1962.
