= 9th Armoured Brigade (United Kingdom) =

- 9th Armoured Brigade Formation Badge.
- Active: 1941 - 1967
- Disbanded: 1967
- Country: United Kingdom
- Allegiance: British Empire
- Branch: British Army
- Type: Armoured
- Size: Brigade

The 9th Armoured Brigade was a British Army brigade formed during the Second World War.

The 9th Armoured Brigade was formed by the renaming of the 4th Cavalry Brigade, a 1st Line Yeomanry (mounted) brigade in the Territorial Army, which had been part of the 1st Cavalry Division. It was converted to tanks on 3 August 1941 in the Middle East and joined the 10th Armoured Division.

== Second World War ==
=== El Alamein ===
During the North Africa campaign, the Brigade was commanded by Brigadier J.C.Currie and fought at the Second Battle of El Alamein. Its units were:

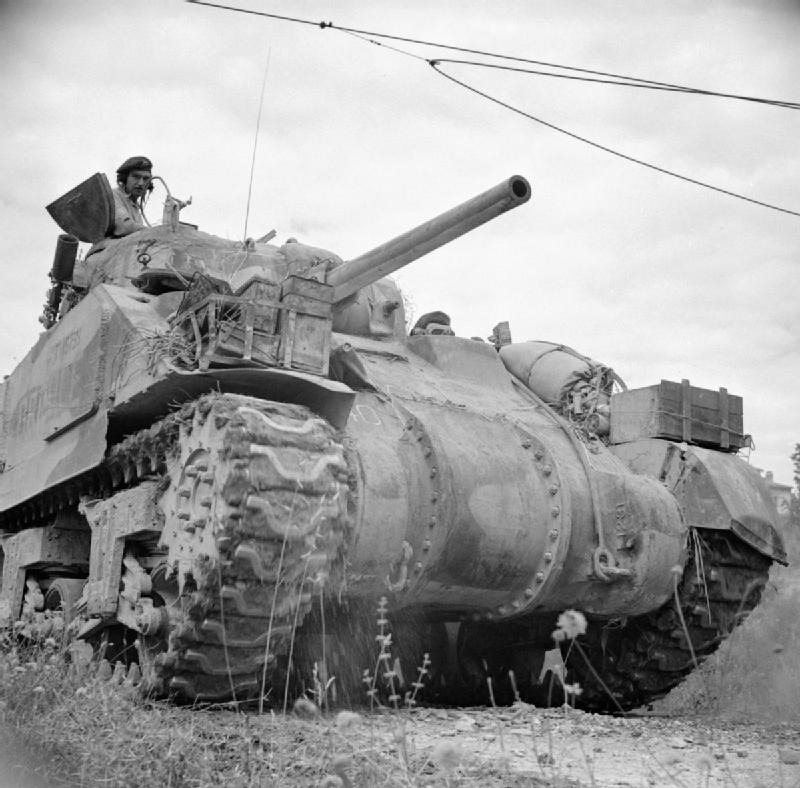
Sherman tank of 3rd Hussars, 9th Armoured Brigade, 7 July 1944.

- 3rd Hussars
- Royal Wiltshire Yeomanry
- Warwickshire Yeomanry
- 9th Armoured Brigade Signal Squadron (Middlesex Yeomanry), Royal Corps of Signals

The Brigade was nominally independent but was placed under command of the 2nd New Zealand Division specifically for the El Alamein battle. Following permission given by the New Zealanders, they proudly painted the Kiwis' divisional sign on their tanks. The NZ infantry gained their objectives, but as with Operation Lightfoot on the first day of the battle, lanes could not be cleared through the minefields until night was almost over. 9th Armoured Brigade was forced to make its attack silhouetted by the early daylight. As dawn came on 2 November, tank after tank was hit by the German 88 mm guns that kept firing through seven air attacks. The 9th never reached their objective. They suffered 75 per cent casualties and lost 102 of their 128 tanks. The brigade managed to breach the gun line and the 1st Armoured Division (Raymond Briggs) of X Corps, was able to engage.

After the Brigade's action, Brigadier William Gentry of the 6th New Zealand Brigade went ahead to survey the scene. On seeing Brigadier Currie asleep on a stretcher, he approached him saying, "Sorry to wake you John, but I'd like to know where your tanks are?" Currie waved his hand at a group of tanks around him, replying "There they are". Gentry was puzzled. "I don't mean your headquarters tanks, I mean your armoured regiments. Where are they?" Currie waved his arm and again replied, "There are my armoured regiments, Bill".

The assault of 2nd New Zealand Division had drawn in the 15th Panzer Division and the 21st Panzer Division with the result that there was a wide gap in the Axis lines to the south-west. Through this gap, Lieutenant-General Bernard Montgomery, commander of the Eighth Army, pushed the remainder of his armour, breaking the Afrika Korps line and pushing westwards into its rear areas and supply lines. By 4 November, the battle was won and Montgomery was entertaining the captured Afrika Korps commander, Wilhelm von Thoma, to dinner in his caravan.

In an account of the battle published to mark its 25th anniversary, Montgomery wrote:

I must mention the magnificent fight put up by 9th Armoured Brigade – 3rd Hussars, Wiltshire Yeomanry, Warwickshire Yeomanry.... If the British armour owed any debt to the infantry of 8th Army, the debt was paid on 2 November by 9th Armoured Brigade in heroism and blood....

General Bernard Freyberg, the NZ Division commander, also paid tribute to the gallant support provided by the brigade.

=== Post Alamein ===
After the battle, the 9th Armoured Brigade, which had been reduced to a handful of operational tanks, was withdrawn to Syria to regroup and undertake internal security duties. In 1944, the Brigade (with the same three regiments) fought in the Italian campaign in support of the 78th Infantry Division, the 4th Indian Division and the 10th Indian Infantry Division.

== Post War ==
After the reformation of the Territorial Army in 1947, the brigade was reformed as an independent formation within Northern Command. It was almost certainly disbanded by the time that the Territorial Army Volunteer Reserve was formed in 1967.

== See also ==
- British armoured formations of the Second World War
- List of British brigades of the Second World War
