= 183rd Infantry Division "Ciclone" =

- Active: 1943
- Country: Kingdom of Italy
- Branch: Royal Italian Army
- Type: Infantry
- Role: Airborne
- Size: Division
- Engagements: World War II

Insignia
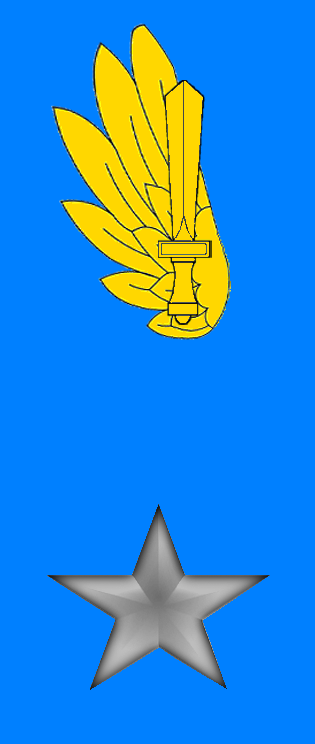
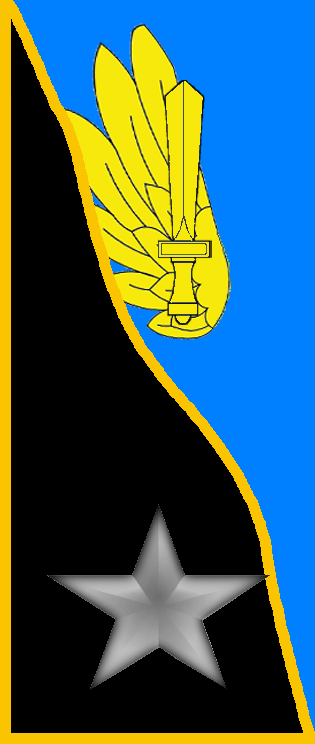
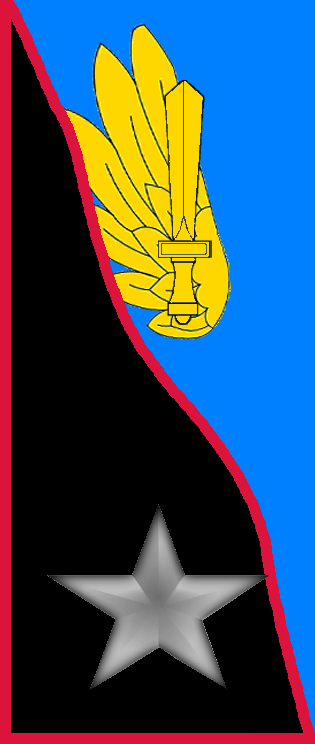
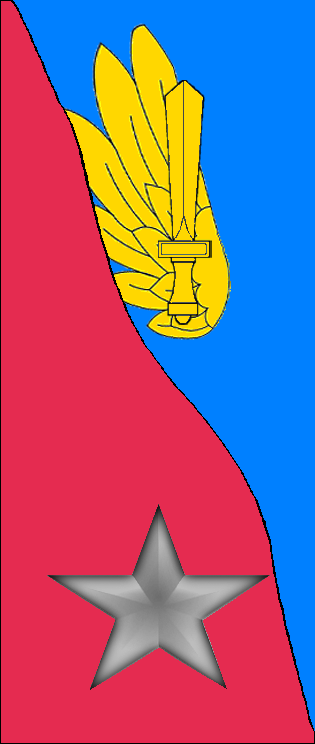
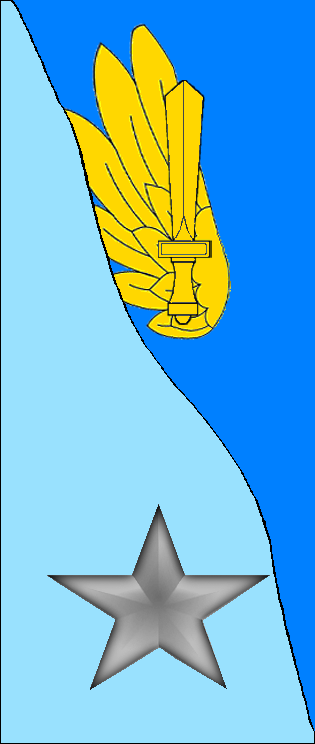
- Identification symbol: Ciclone Division gorget patches

183rd Infantry Division "Ciclone" (Italian: 183ª Divisione fanteria "Ciclone") was a short-lived airborne division of the Royal Italian Army during World War II. The Ciclone began to form in summer 1943 at the Parachute School in Viterbo and by the end of summer four battalions had been trained.

After the Armistice between Italy and Allied armed forces was announced on 8 September 1943 the XX Paratroopers Battalion was dispatched to occupy the Cisa and Futa passes in the Apennine Mountains between Bologna and Florence. Reinforced by elements of the XIX Paratroopers Battalion the paratroopers engaged in light skirmishes with Wehrmacht forces for three days before surrendering. After the surrender more than half of the division's troops decided to join the fascist Aeronautica Nazionale Repubblicana's paratrooper units.

== Organization ==
- 183rd Infantry Division "Ciclone"
  - Command Company
  - XVII Paratroopers Battalion
  - XVIII Paratroopers Battalion
  - XIX Paratroopers Battalion
  - XX Paratroopers Battalion
  - I Paratroopers Artillery Group (47/32 mod. 35 anti-tank guns)

== Commanding officers ==
The division's commanding officer was:

- Generale di Brigata Giorgio Morigi

== See also ==
- Paracadutisti
- Paratroopers Brigade "Folgore" present day Italian Airborne Brigade
