= Paracadutisti =

Speciality of the Italian army's infantry corps

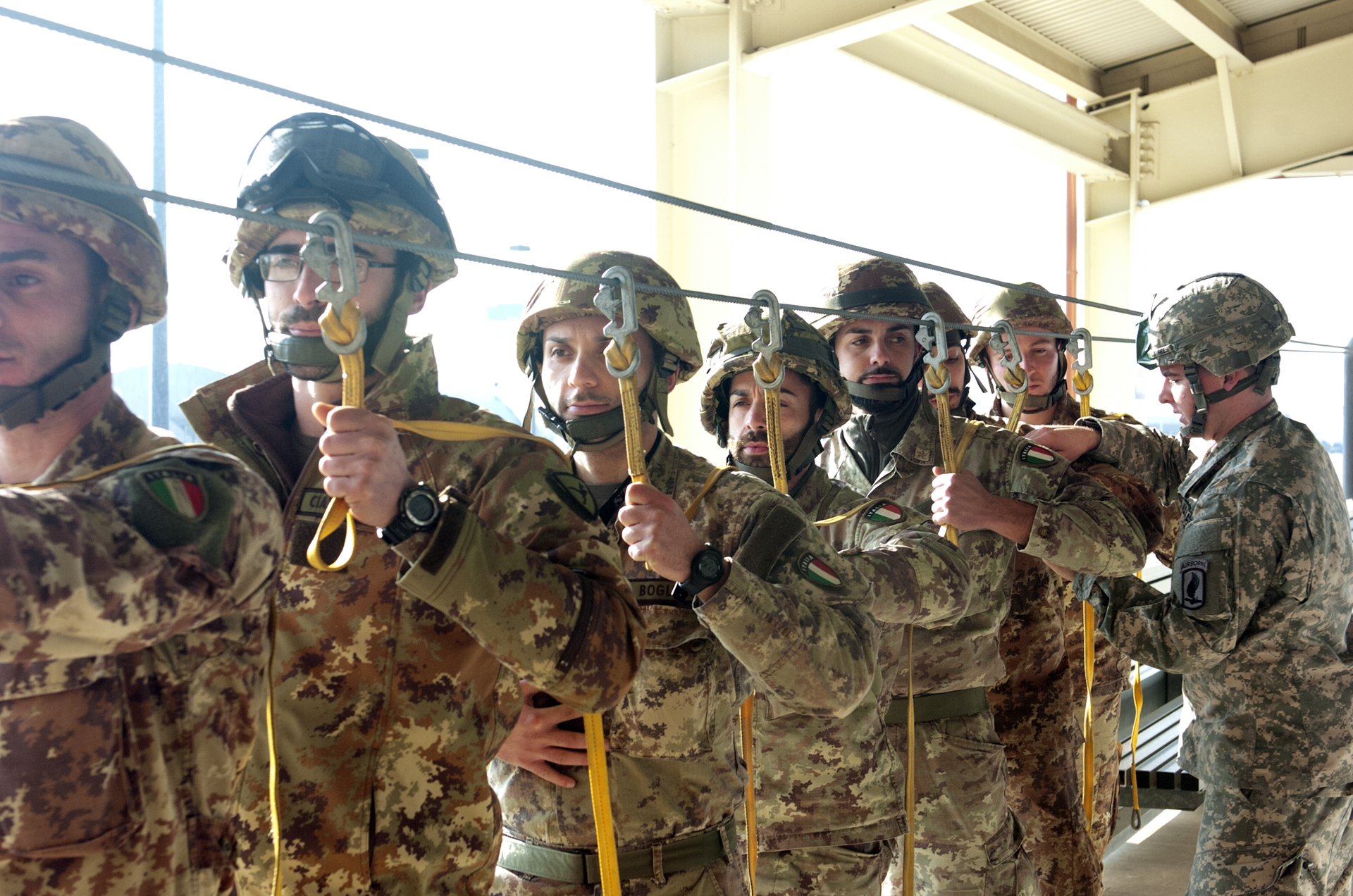
Paratroopers of the Folgore Parachute Brigade performing airborne operations training with a U.S. Army jumpmaster

The Paracadutisti (English: Paratroopers) are a speciality of the Italian army's infantry corps.

== History ==
The first Italian paratroopers were trained shortly before World War II at Castel Benito near Tripoli in Libya, where Italy's first Parachuting School was located. The first paratroopers were two battalions of Libyan Ascari del Cielo. These were joined the first paratroopers of the Royal Italian Army and the 1st Carabinieri Paratroopers Battalion. The latter battalion was formed on 1 July 1940 and fought in the Western Desert Campaign of World War II. The Royal Italian Air Force also had paratrooper units.

In 1941 the staff at Castel Benito was transferred to Tarquinia near Rome where the main Italian Parachuting School was raised, which immediately began to form the first units for the 185th Infantry Division "Folgore".

== The divisions ==
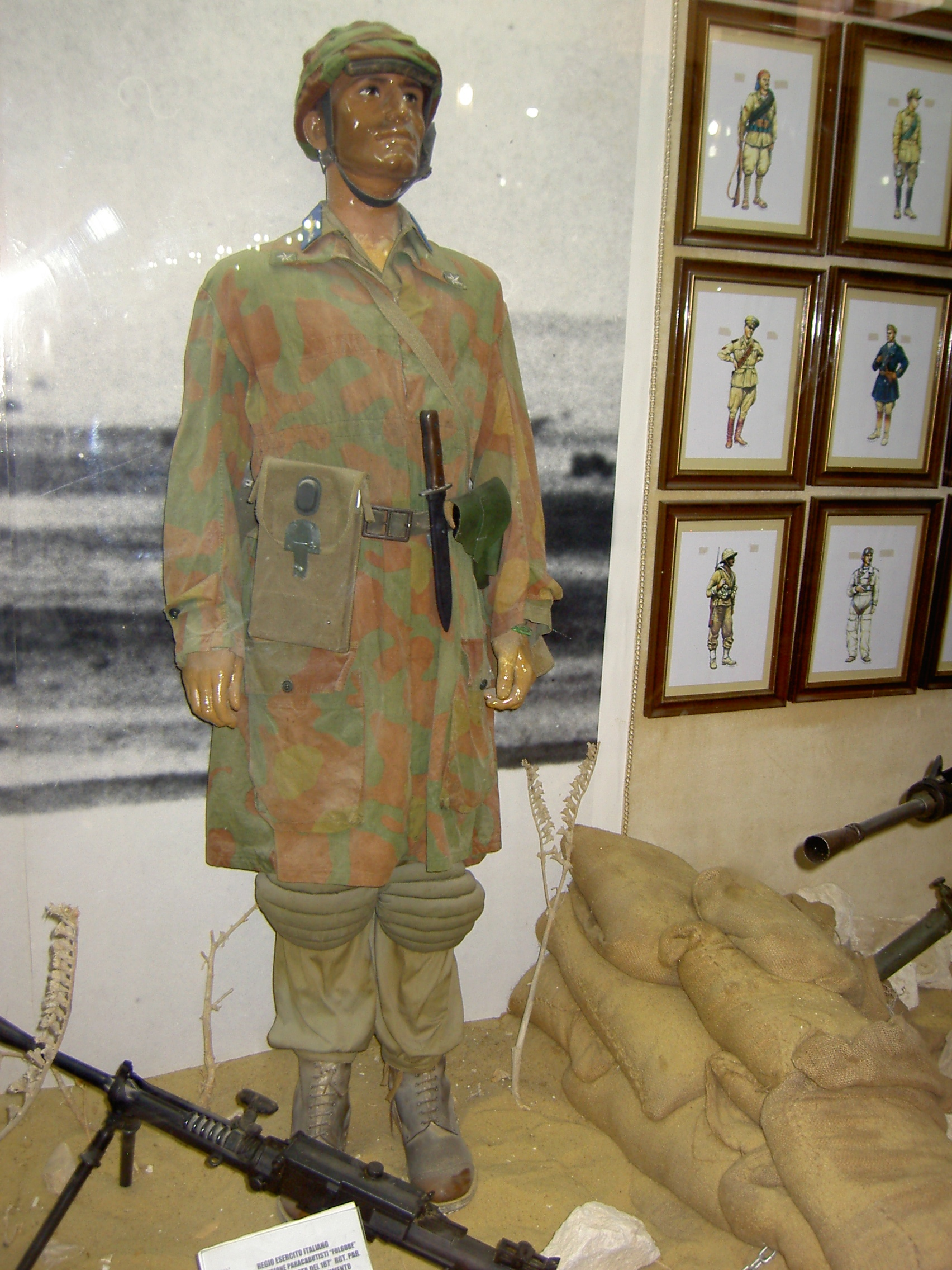
Original military uniform of a paratrooper of the division Folgore in 1942

A second Parachuting School was established in Viterbo and the 184th Infantry Division "Nembo" was raised. A third division, the 183rd Infantry Division "Ciclone" was in the process of forming but the Armistice of Cassibile and the following German invasion of Italy interrupted its organization.

=== Folgore ===
In 1941 the 5,000-man strong 185th Infantry Division "Folgore" was raised for the planned assault on Malta in Operation Hercules. When the Malta invasion was cancelled the paratroopers were sent as regular infantry to Libya, despite being poorly equipped for this role. The division was engaged in ground combat operations in the Western Desert Campaign from July 1942 until its destruction in the Second Battle of El Alamein. After the battle the survivors were grouped into the CLXXXV Paratroopers Battalion.

During the Second battle of El Alamein the division was attacked by six British divisions (two armored and four infantry). Lacking effective anti-tank weapons, the Italian paratroopers stopped British tanks with their obsolete 47/32 guns and petrol bombs. The Folgore, having run out of water, withdrew from El Alamein at 2:00 a.m. on 3 November 1942. At 2:35 p.m. on 6 November what was left of the division was surrounded by the British forces. The exhausted paratroopers destroyed their weapons and then surrendered.

=== Nembo ===
The 184th Infantry Division "Nembo" was raised in 1942. In summer 1943 the Nembo was sent to Sardinia, where it survived the Armistice of Cassibile almost intact. Shipped to the Italian mainland in May 1944 the division joined the Italian Liberation Corps of the Italian Co-Belligerent Army. The division fought in the battle Battle of Ancona and was disbanded on 24 September 1944 to form with its personnel the Combat Group "Folgore".

=== Ciclone ===
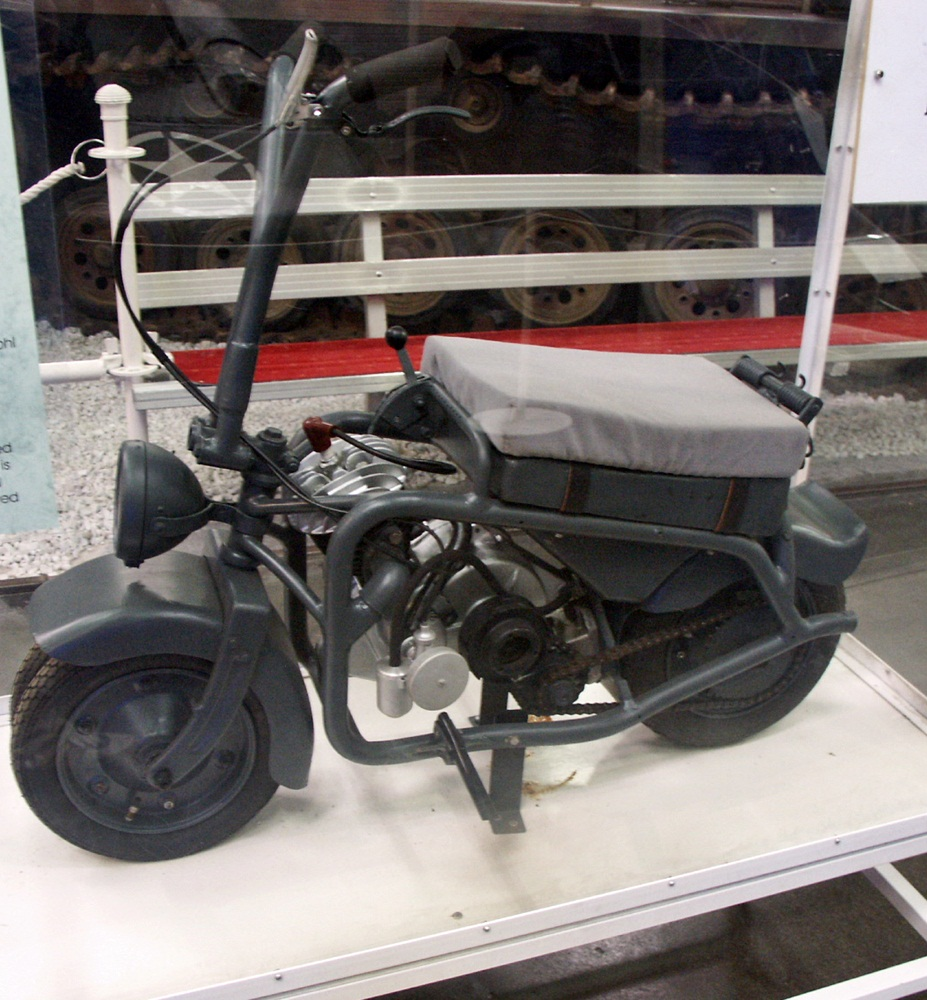
1944 paracadutisti motorcycle

The 183rd Infantry Division "Ciclone" was planned to become the third Italian paratroopers division, however the Armistice of Cassibile and disbanded by the invading Germans.

== RSI Paracadutisti ==
A number of paratroopers units were raised by Mussolini's Italian Social Republic:

- National Republican Army - raised the 350-men Paratroopers Battalion "Nembo", which suffered 70% casualties during the Battle of Anzio
- National Republican Air Force - raised the Paratroopers Regiment "Folgore" with three battalions
- National Republican Navy - Xa MAS - Paratrooper Swimmers Battalion, which was formed by volunteers of the Royal Italian Navy San Marco Regiment's Paratrooper Battalion. A flood of volunteers joined the battalion increasing it to over 1,400 men
- National Republican Guard - raised the 300-men Paratroopers Battalion "Mazzarini", which operated mainly against partisans in the Padan Plain from August 1944 until 1945

== Modern Italian paratrooper units ==
=== Italian Army ===
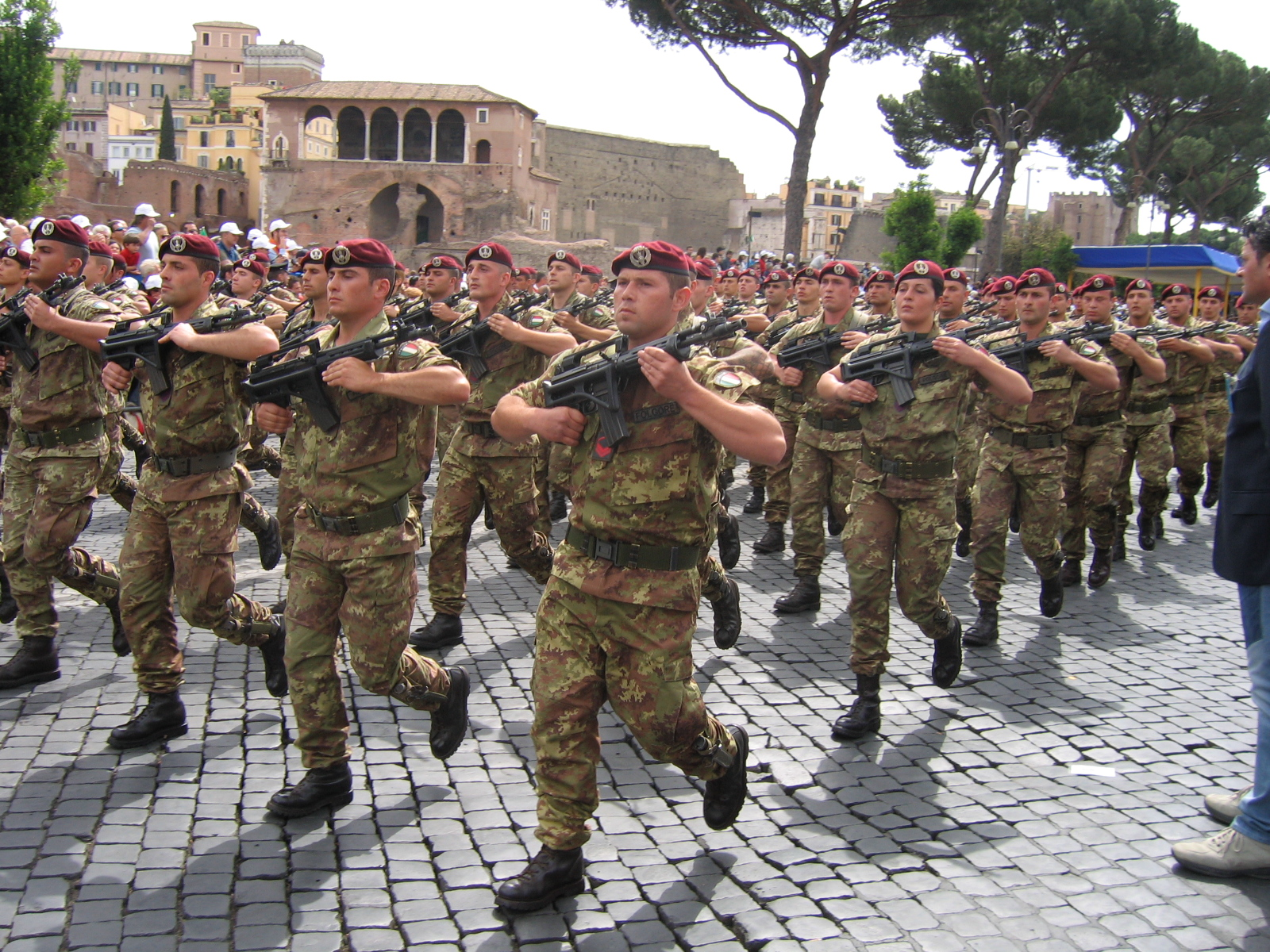
183rd Paratroopers Regiment "Nembo" parading 2 June 2006 in Rome

- Italian Army
  - Paratroopers Brigade "Folgore"
    - 8th Paratroopers Engineer Regiment "Folgore"
    - 183rd Paratroopers Regiment "Nembo"
    - 184th Paratroopers Command and Tactical Supports Unit "Nembo"
    - 185th Paratroopers Artillery Regiment "Folgore"
    - 186th Paratroopers Regiment "Folgore"
    - 187th Paratroopers Regiment "Folgore"
  - Army Special Forces Command
    - 4th Alpini Paratroopers Regiment
    - 9th Paratroopers Assault Regiment "Col Moschin"
    - 185th Paratroopers Reconnaissance Target Acquisition Regiment "Folgore"

==== Missions ====
In 1982 the Folgore brigade landed in Beirut with the Multinational Force in Lebanon. In 1991, a Paratroopers Tactical Group was deployed to Kurdistan. Its mission was to provide humanitarian aid. From July 1992, the Folgore supplied personnel to Operation Vespri Siciliani. From 3 December 1992 to September 1993 the Folgore participated in Operation Restore Hope in Somalia. Parts of the Folgore have been employed many times in the Balkans (IFOR/SFOR in Bosnia and KFOR in Kosovo), with MNF in Albania and INTERFET in East Timor. The Folgore participated from August 2005 to September 2005 in Operation Babylon in Iraq and was last deployed to Afghanistan in December 2014.

In August 2007, the Folgore took part in United Nations Interim Force in Lebanon, under aegis of the United Nations (Resolution 1701), as a result of the war between Israel and Hezbollah of summer 2006.

=== Other Italian paratroopers units ===
- 1st Carabinieri Paratroopers Regiment "Tuscania": a special-operations unit of the Carabinieri. The Tuscania is currently based in Livorno, and has approximately 550 personnel.

== See also ==
- Paratroopers
- Paratrooper forces around the world
