= 187th Paratroopers Regiment "Folgore" =

Active Italian Army paratroopers unit

- 187° Reggimento Paracadutisti "Folgore"
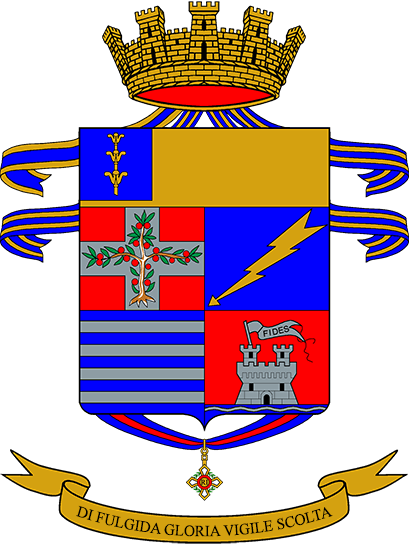
- Regimental coat of arms
- Active: 15 March 1942 — 6 Nov. 1942; 1 Oct. 1975 — today
- Country: Italy
- Branch: Italian Army
- Part of: Paratroopers Brigade "Folgore"
- Garrison/HQ: Livorno
- Motto(s): "Di fulgida gloria vigile scolta"
- Anniversaries: 23 October 1942 - Second Battle of El Alamein
- Decorations: 1x Military Order of Italy; 1x Gold Medal of Military Valor; 2x Silver Medals of Army Valor; 1x Bronze Medal of Army Valor

Insignia
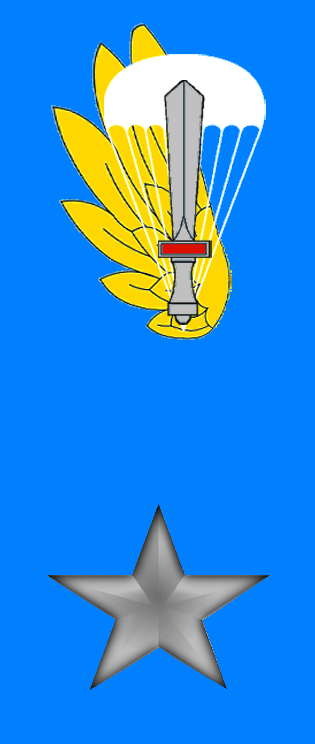
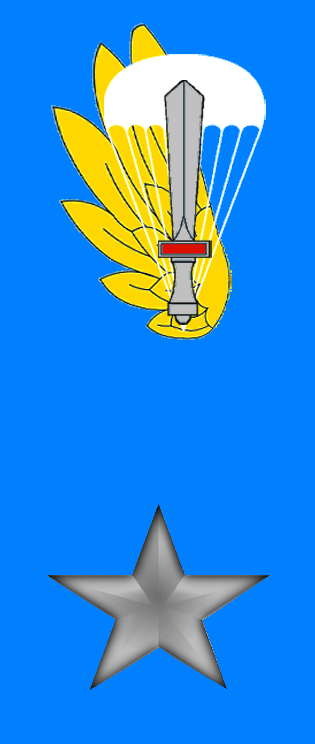
- Paratroopers gorget patches

The 187th Paratroopers Regiment "Folgore" (Italian: 187° Reggimento Paracadutisti "Folgore") is a paratroopers unit of the Italian Army based in Livorno in Tuscany. The regiment is part of the Italian Army's infantry arm's Paracadutisti speciality and assigned to the Paratroopers Brigade "Folgore".

The 187th Infantry Regiment "Folgore" was formed in March 1942 as the Royal Italian Army's third paratroopers regiment. The regiment was assigned to the Paratroopers Division, which was intended to parachute onto Malta during the planned invasion of Malta. In July 1942, the invasion of Malta was postponed indefinitely. In September 1942, the "Folgore" division was sent to North Africa to reinforce the German-Italian Panzer Army Africa at El Alamein. In November 1942, the "Folgore" division and its regiments were destroyed during the Second Battle of El Alamein. For its conduct at El Alamein the 187th Infantry Regiment "Folgore" was awarded Italy's highest military honor the Gold Medal of Military Valor.

In 1957, the regiment's II Paratroopers Battalion was reformed and assigned to the 1st Paratroopers Tactical Group, which in 1963 was used to reform the 1st Paratroopers Regiment. In 1975, the 1st Paratroopers Regiment was disbanded and the II Paratroopers Battalion became an autonomous unit, which was renamed 2nd Paratroopers Battalion "Tarquinia". The battalion, which was based in Livorno and assigned to the Paratroopers Brigade "Folgore", received the flag and traditions of the 187th Infantry Regiment "Folgore". In 1992, the 2nd Paratroopers Battalion "Tarquinia" lost its autonomy and entered the reformed 187th Paratroopers Regiment "Folgore". The regiment's anniversary falls on 23 October 1942, the day the Second Battle of El Alamein began.

== History ==
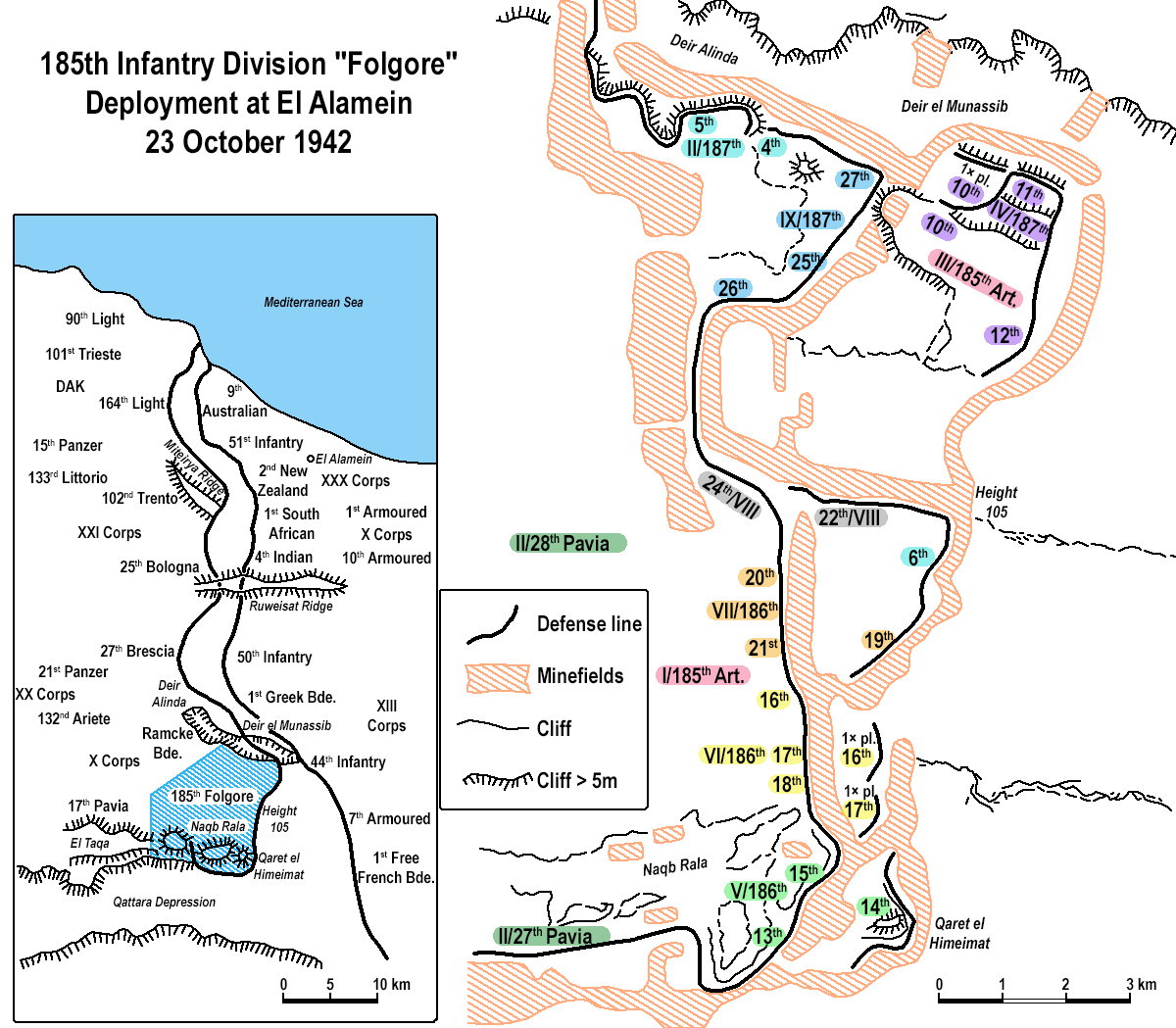
185th Infantry Division "Folgore" deployment on the eve of the Second Battle of El Alamein (click to enlarge)

=== World War II ===
On 4 October 1941, the Royal Italian Army's General Staff ordered to form the command of the 3rd Paratroopers Regiment, which after its formation would move to Libya and take command of the I Carabinieri Paratroopers Battalion and the Libyan Paratroopers Battalion. However, once the command had been formed, the order to move to North Africa was canceled and, on 1 January 1942, the command was assigned to the Paratroopers Division. The division was one of the Royal Italian Army units assigned to the planned invasion of Malta. On 15 March 1942, the 3rd Paratroopers Regiment received the VIII, IX, and X paratroopers battalions and the 3rd Cannons Company, which was equipped with 47/32 mod. 35 anti-tank guns. On the same day, the 3rd Paratroopers Regiment was officially formed in Pisa.

For the planned air assault on Malta the Paratroopers Division required a sappers unit and the army decided it would be more expedient to train paratroopers as sappers, rather than sappers as paratroopers. Consequently, in May 1942, the VIII Paratroopers Battalion left the 3rd Paratroopers Regiment and moved to the army's Sappers School in Civitavecchia. After the conclusion of the sapper training the battalion was renamed VIII Paratroopers Sappers Battalion and sent to Bagnoli, where it attended an assault engineering course held by German combat engineers. As replacement the 3rd Paratroopers Regiment received the XI Paratroopers Battalion, which was in the process of being formed by the Royal Italian Air Force's Paratroopers School in Tarquinia. Afterwards the 3rd Paratroopers regiment consisted of the following units:

- 3rd Paratroopers Regiment
  - Command Company
  - IX Paratroopers Battalion
    - 25th, 26th, and 27th Company
  - X Paratroopers Battalion
    - 28th, 29th, and 30th Company
  - XI Paratroopers Battalion
    - 31st, 32nd, and 33rd Company
  - 3rd Cannons Company (47/32 mod. 35 anti-tank guns)

In July 1942, after the First Battle of El Alamein, the invasion of Malta was postponed indefinitely and the Royal Italian Army's General Staff decided to send the Paratroopers Division to North Africa to reinforce the depleted German-Italian Panzer Army Africa at El Alamein in Egypt. As the Paratroopers Division would operate in North Africa as an infantry formation, the division was renamed on 27 July 1942 185th Infantry Division "Folgore". On the same day, the 3rd Paratroopers Regiment was renamed 187th Infantry Regiment "Folgore", while the 1st Paratroopers Regiment was renamed 185th Infantry Regiment "Folgore", the 2nd Paratroopers Regiment was renamed 186th Infantry Regiment "Folgore", and the Artillery Regiment for Paratroopers Division was renamed 185th Artillery Regiment "Folgore". However, as the XI Paratroopers Battalion had not yet completed its training, the 187th Infantry Regiment "Folgore" transferred the battalion to the 185th Infantry Regiment "Folgore", which remained in Italy to help form the 184th Infantry Division "Nembo". On 15 September 1942, the 185th Infantry Regiment "Folgore" left the 185th Infantry Division "Folgore", and, on the same day, the regiment ceded its II and IV paratroopers battalions to the 187th Infantry Regiment "Folgore".

The II Paratroopers Battalion had been formed on 1 July 1940 by the Royal Italian Air Force's Paratroopers School in Tarquinia as I Paratroopers Battalion. In the following days, the Paratroopers School formed the II Paratroopers Battalion, and then the III Paratroopers Battalion, which consisted of personnel drawn from the Carabinieri troops. On 15 July 1940, the I Paratroopers Battalion ceded its number for reason of precedence to the III Paratroopers Battalion, which on the same day was redesignated I Carabinieri Paratroopers Battalion. On the same day the I Paratroopers Battalion was renumbered as II Paratroopers Battalion, while the II Paratroopers Battalion was renumbered as III Paratroopers Battalion. On 30 April 1941, the last day of the Battle of Greece, three Savoia-Marchetti SM.82 transport planes left Galatina Air Base with 75 paratroopers of the II Paratroopers Battalion. In the early hours of the afternoon, the paratroopers conducted the first Italian airborne assault near Argostoli on the Greek island of Cephalonia. The Greek troops on the island surrendered without bloodshed on the same day. The next day the paratroopers commandeered some boats and proceeded to occupy the islands of Zakynthos and Ithaca.

After arriving at El Alamein the "Folgore" division was sent to the extreme South of the Axis line between the Deir el Munassib depression and the Qaret el Himeimat hills, where the impassable Qattara Depression began. At the time the division fielded around 5,000 men and the 187th Infantry Regiment "Folgore" consisted of the following units:

- 187th Infantry Regiment "Folgore"
  - II Paratroopers Battalion
    - 4th, 5th, and 6th Company
  - IV Paratroopers Battalion
    - 10th, 11th, and 12th Company
  - IX Paratroopers Battalion
    - 25th, 26th, and 27th Company
  - X Paratroopers Battalion
    - 28th, 29th, and 30th Company
  - 187th Cannons Company (47/32 mod. 35 anti-tank guns)

From 30 August to 5 September 1942, the "Folgore" division participated in General Erwin Rommel's unsuccessful attempt to outflank the British Eighth Army at El Alamein in the Battle of Alam el Halfa. On 29 September 1942, the British forces launched Operation Braganza against the paratroopers of the "Folgore" division, which, despite their numerical inferiority, managed to repulse the attack. During Operation Braganza the IX and X paratroopers battalions suffered heavy losses and, consequently, the X Paratroopers Battalion was disbanded and its personnel transferred to the IX Paratroopers Battalion.

On 23 October 1942, the British Eighth Army began the Second battle of El Alamein. At the time the 187th Infantry Regiment held the northern half of the "Folgore" division's position. At 10:30 am on 25 October 1942, the British 7th Armoured Division, 44th Infantry Division, 50th Infantry Division, and the 1st Free French Brigade launched an all out attack from three sides against the "Folgore" division. By 3am of 26 October, the Italian paratroopers had repulsed the attack and still held all their positions. On 2 November 1942, the "Folgore" division was ordered to retreat westwards, even though none of the division's positions had been lost to the British. During the night of 2 to 3 November 1942, the "Folgore" division began its retreat, leaving 1,100 dead behind. The "Folgore" division, which formed the Axis' rearguard, had no motorized transport and thus was forced to walk through the desert. However, on 6 November 1942, the remnants of the division were overtaken and surrounded by motorized British forces and forced to surrender. On 25 November 1942, the 185th Infantry Division "Folgore" and the division's regiments were declared lost due to wartime events.

For their conduct and sacrifice during the Western Desert campaign at El Alamein the three regiments of the 185th Infantry Division "Folgore" were awarded Italy's highest military honor, the Gold Medal of Military Valor.

With few survivors of the "Folgore" division the Royal Italian Army formed the CCLXXXV Paratroopers Battalion "Folgore", which fought in the Tunisian campaign on the Mareth Line. On 20–21 April 1943, the battalion was destroyed during the Battle of Takrouna.

=== Cold War ===
In 1952, the Italian Army's Military Parachuting Center in Pisa formed a paratroopers battalion, which in 1957 was reorganized as 1st Paratroopers Tactical Group. The group, which was based in Livorno, consisted of the II Paratroopers Battalion and V Paratroopers Battalion. On 1 January 1963, the Military Parachuting Center was reorganized as Paratroopers Brigade. On the same day, the 1st Paratroopers Tactical Group was renamed 1st Paratroopers Regiment and assigned to the brigade. The reformed regiment consisted of a command, a command company, the II Paratroopers Battalion, the V Paratroopers Battalion, and a mortar company. On 10 June 1967, the Paratroopers Brigade was renamed Paratroopers Brigade "Folgore".

During the 1975 army reform the Italian Army disbanded the regimental level and newly independent battalions were granted for the first time their own flags. On 30 September 1975, the 1st Paratroopers Regiment and the regiment's command company were disbanded. The next day, on 1 October 1975, the regiment's two battalions became autonomous units and were renamed 2nd Paratroopers Battalion "Tarquinia" and 5th Paratroopers Battalion "El Alamein", while the regiment's mortar company was split to form two new mortar companies, which were assigned to the two paratroopers battalions. The 2nd Paratroopers Battalion, which had served with the 187th Infantry Regiment "Folgore" at El Alamein, was named after the city of Tarquinia, where the Royal Italian Air Force's Paratroopers School had formed the first Italian paratroopers battalions. The two battalions were assigned to the Paratroopers Brigade "Folgore". Both battalions consisted of a command, a command and services company, three paratroopers companies, and a heavy mortar company with towed 120mm Mod. 63 mortars and each of the two battalions fielded 879 men (41 officers, 95 non-commissioned officers, and 743 soldiers).

On 12 November 1976, the President of the Italian Republic Giovanni Leone assigned with decree 846 the flag and traditions of the 187th Infantry Regiment "Folgore" to the 2nd Paratroopers Battalion "Tarquinia".

In 1981, the formed a fourth paratroopers company, which was designated as 10th Paratroopers Company. During World War II the 10th Company was assigned to the IV Paratroopers Battalion, which had served with the 187th Infantry Regiment "Folgore" at El Alamein. Afterwards the 2nd Paratroopers Battalion "Tarquinia" consisted of the following units:

- 2nd Paratroopers Battalion "Tarquinia", in Livorno
  - Command and Services Company
  - 4th Paratroopers Company
  - 5th Paratroopers Company
  - 6th Paratroopers Company
  - 10th Paratroopers Company
  - Mortar Company (120mm Mod. 63 mortars)

From October 1982 to February 1983, the battalion was deployed with the Multinational Force in Lebanon.

=== Recent times ===
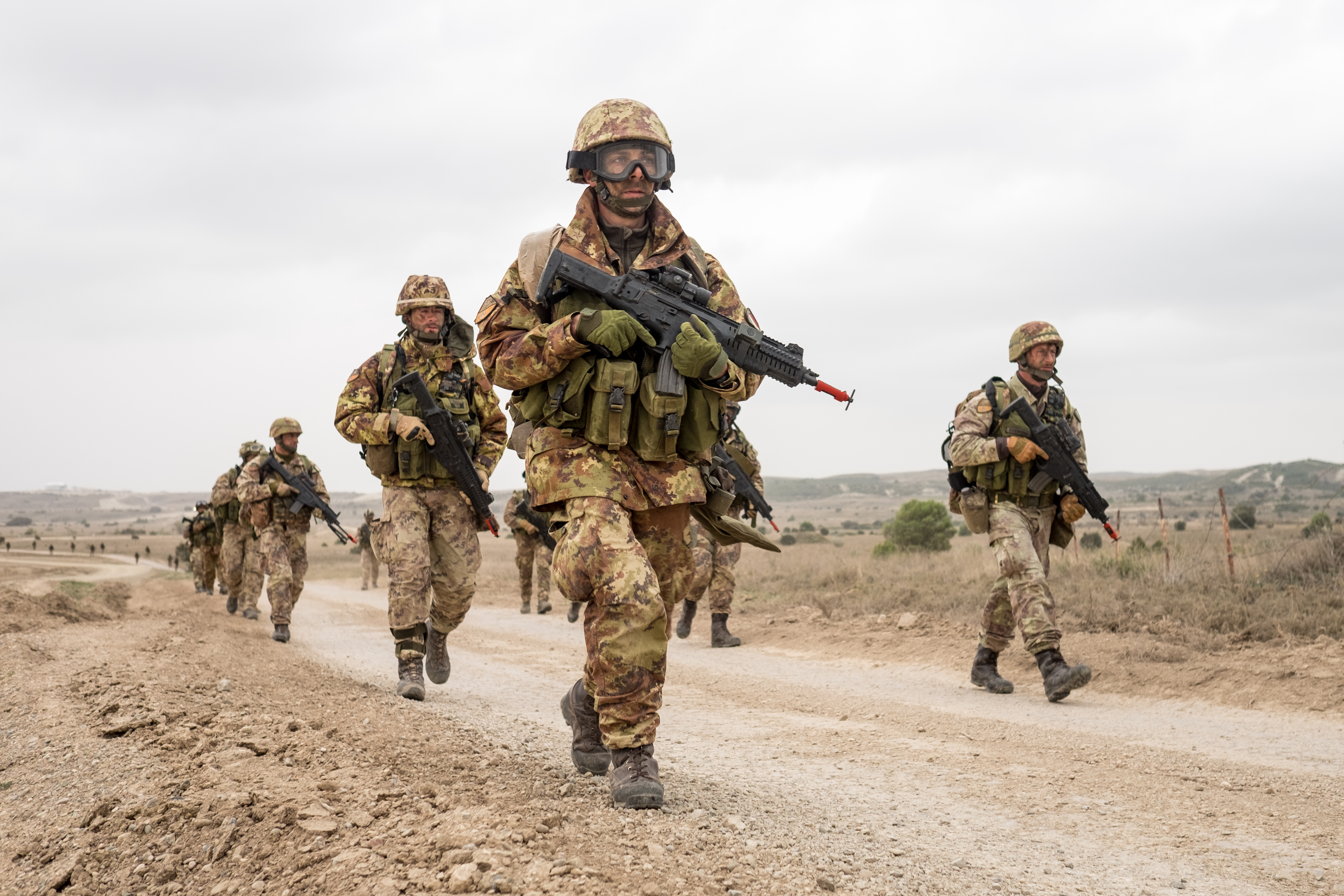
Paratroopers of the 187th Paratroopers Regiment "Folgore" during exercise Trident Juncture 15

On 8 October 1992, the 2nd Paratroopers Battalion "Tarquinia" lost its autonomy and the next day the battalion entered the reformed 187th Paratroopers Regiment "Folgore". On the same day, the flag and traditions of the 187th Infantry Regiment "Folgore" were transferred from the battalion to the reformed regiment. In 1993, the regiment was deployed to Somalia for the American-led Unified Task Force. For its conduct in Somalia the regiment was awarded a Silver Medal of Army Valor, which was affixed to the regiment's flag and added to its coat of arms.

From 3 July 1996 to 24 March 1997, the regiment deployed to Bosnia and Herzegovina, where the regiment was initially assigned to the NATO-led Implementation Force and then to the NATO-led Stabilisation Force in Bosnia and Herzegovina. For its conduct in Bosnia and Herzegovina the regiment was awarded a Silver Medal of Army Valor, which was affixed to the regiment's flag and added to its coat of arms. From 15 April to 12 August 1997, the regiment took part in Operation Alba, a multinational peacekeeping mission in Albania.

From 15 June to 15 September 2003, the regiment deployed to Khost in Afghanistan for the NATO-led International Security Assistance Force. During its time in Afghanistan the regiment repeatedly clashed with Taliban forces. For its conduct in Afghanistan the regiment was awarded a Military Order of Italy, which was affixed to the regiment's flag and added to its coat of arms. From 3 April to 20 October 2009, the regiment returned to Afghanistan. For its conduct during its second deployment to Afghanistan the regiment was awarded a Bronze Medal of Army Valor, which was affixed to the regiment's flag and added to its coat of arms. In 2011, the regiment's mortar company transferred one of its mortar platoons to the 10th Paratroopers Company, which also added a reconnaissance platoon and an anti-tank guided missile platoon. Subsequently, the mortar company was disbanded, while the 10th Paratroopers Company was renamed 10th Paratroopers Maneuver Support Company.

== Organization ==
As of 2024 the 187th Paratroopers Regiment "Folgore" is organized as follows:

- 187th Paratroopers Regiment "Folgore", in Livorno
  - Command and Logistic Support Company
  - 2nd Paratroopers Battalion "Tarquinia"
    - 4th Paratroopers Company
    - 5th Paratroopers Company
    - 6th Paratroopers Company
    - 10th Paratroopers Maneuver Support Company

The regiment is equipped with VTLM Lince vehicles. The 10th Paratroopers Maneuver Support Company is equipped with 120mm mortars and Spike MR anti-tank guided missiles.

== See also ==
- Paratroopers Brigade "Folgore"
