= 1971 RAF Hercules crash =

Aviation accident off the coast of Italy

Coordinates: 43.5478°N 10.2186°E

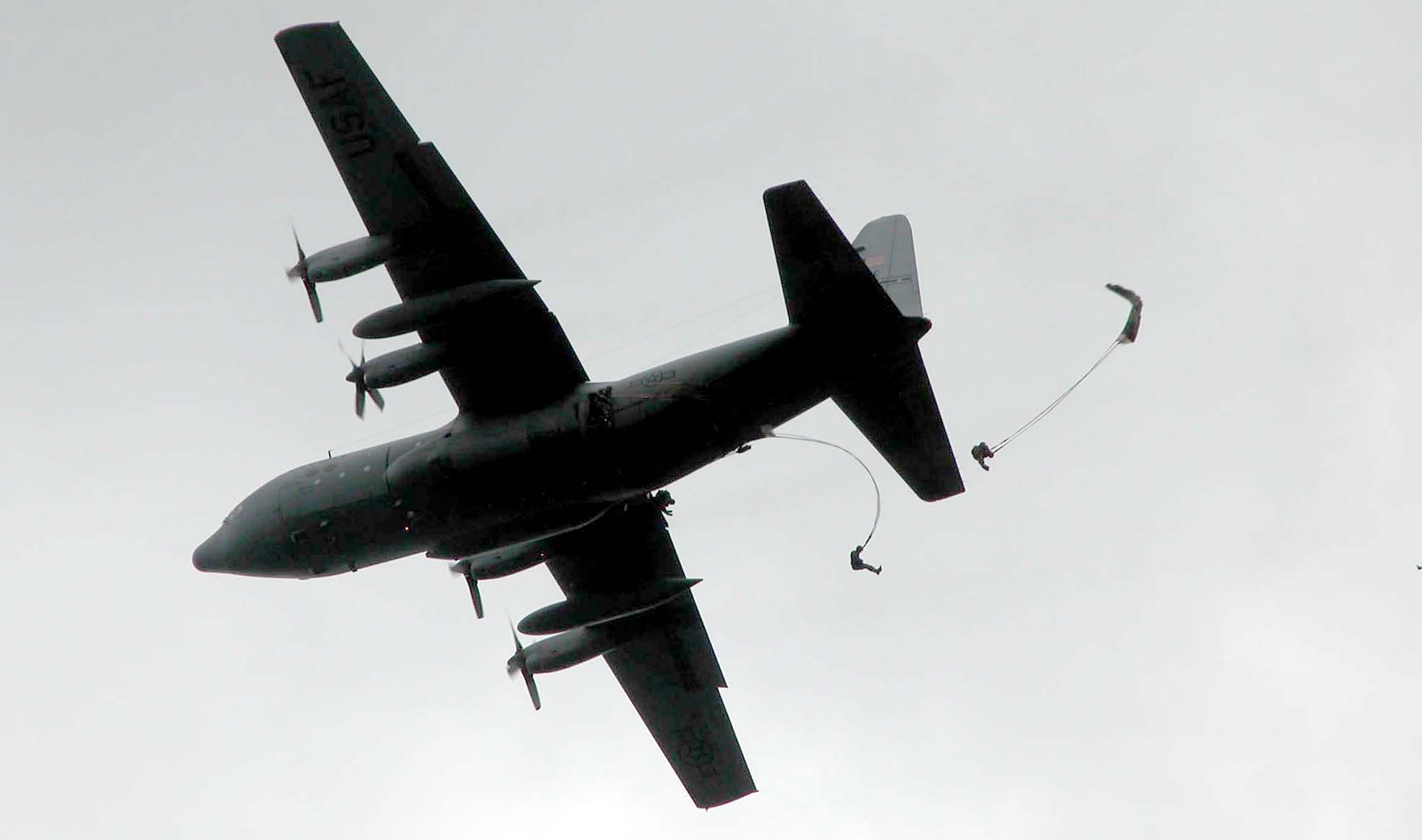
- A Hercules aircraft dropping paratroopers, similar to the aircraft which crashed

Accident
- Date: 9 November 1971
- Summary: Controlled flight into sea
- Site: 17 1/2; miles west-south-west of Pisa

Aircraft
- Aircraft type: Lockheed Hercules C.1
- Aircraft name: Chalk 4
- Operator: No. 24 Squadron, Royal Air Force
- Registration: XV216
- Flight origin: Pisa Airport, Pisa, Italy
- Destination: Villacidro, Sardinia, Italy
- Occupants: 52
- Passengers: 46
- Crew: 6
- Fatalities: 52
- Survivors: 0

On 9 November 1971, a Royal Air Force Lockheed Hercules C.1 crashed into the sea off the coast of Livorno by Meloria shoal, Italy, killing all 46 passengers and 6 crew. At the time it was described by Italian officials as the worst military air disaster in Italy in peacetime.

== Crash ==
The Hercules serial number XV216, from RAF Lyneham in Wiltshire, was due to carry out an early morning parachute drop at Cagliari, Sardinia, as part of a large-scale joint training exercise called Coldstream. Ten aircraft were to be involved;^{[I]} nine Hercules and one Hawker Siddeley Andover. Their order of takeoff was marked by a serial number, chalked onto the fuselage of each aircraft. The Hercules known as Chalk 4 was the fourth of the 10 aircraft due to depart at fifteen-minute intervals from San Giusto military airport in Pisa, Italy. The aircraft crashed near the Meloria rocks, four miles west of Livorno. At Pisa, the stream take-off was cancelled, another four aircraft had followed XV216 into the air but the last two were prevented from departing.

All 52 on board were killed, they included five British aircrew from 24 Squadron, a British parachute jumping instructor from No. 1 Parachute Training School at RAF Abingdon and 46 Italian paratroopers from the Folgore Parachute Brigade.

== Recovery ==
It was at first difficult to find the wreckage due to a persistent wind and low clouds. The wreckage was found lying in 200 feet (61 m) of water, although small fragments had already been recovered, the salvage operation, which was hindered by the bad weather, was led by the Italian Navy. The cause of the accident was not found.

== Memorial ==
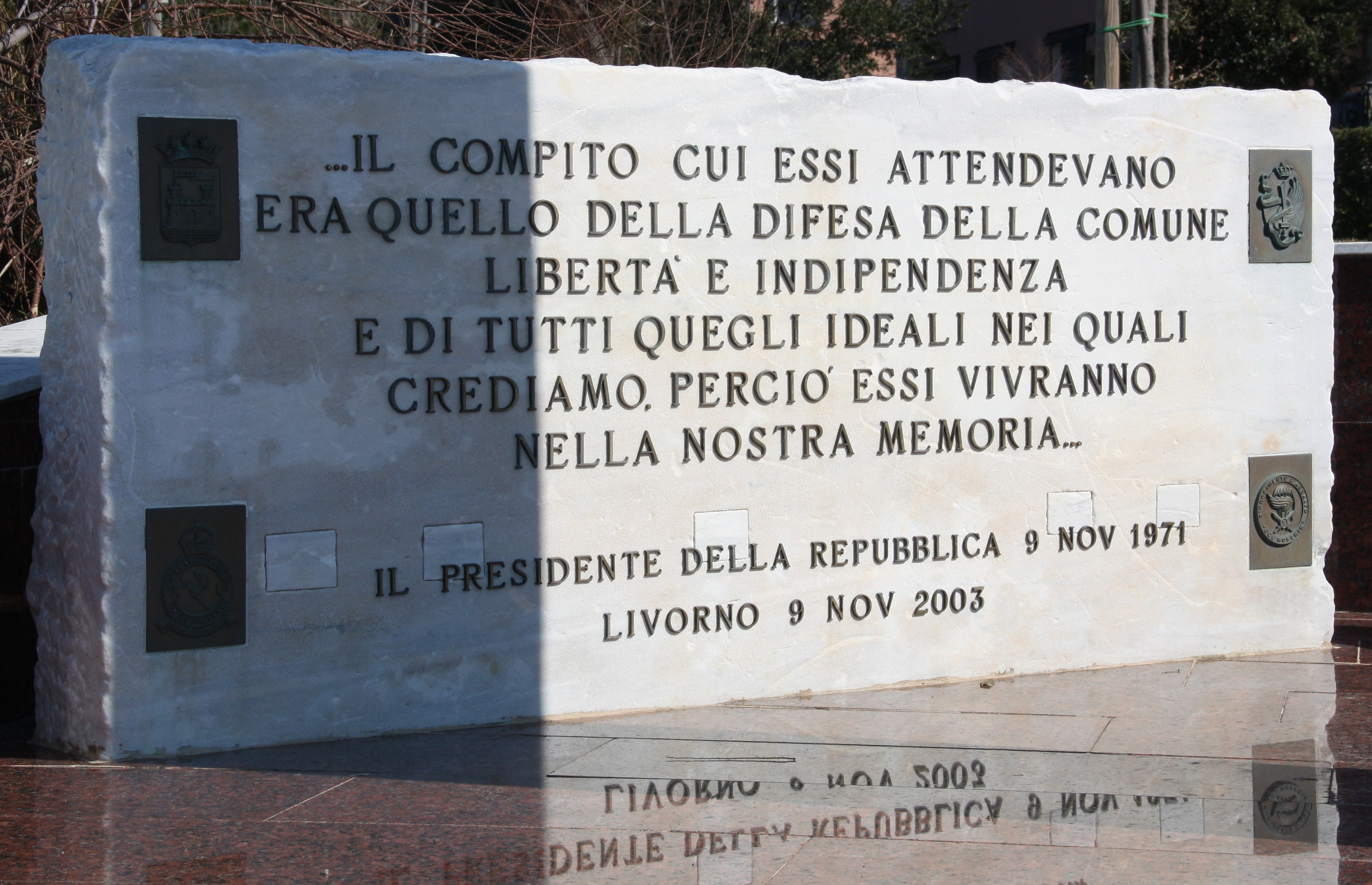
A memorial plaque in Livorno commemorates the accident.

A memorial plaque was erected in Livorno in 2003 to commemorate the accident. On 21 November 2006, a memorial service was held in Pisa, attended by a delegation from No. 24 Squadron, current operators of the C-130J Hercules, and relatives of the lost crew members.

== Notes ==
I: Five of the ten aircraft were from the Royal Air Force.

== Sources ==
- Halley, James (1999). Broken Wings – Post-War Royal Air Force Accidents. Tunbridge Wells, Kent, United Kingdom: Air-Britain (Historians) Litd. ISBN 0-85130-290-4.
- Halley, James (2001). Royal Air Force Aircraft XA100 to XZ999. Air-Britain. ISBN 0-85130-311-0.
- Falciglia, Aldo. ""Gesso quattro non-risponde" – La sciagura alle secche della Meloria". Folgore (Associazione Nazionale Paracadutisti d'Italia) (November/December 2011 (No. 11–12)).
