= 186th Paratroopers Regiment "Folgore" =

Active Italian Army paratroopers unit

- 186° Reggimento Paracadutisti "Folgore"
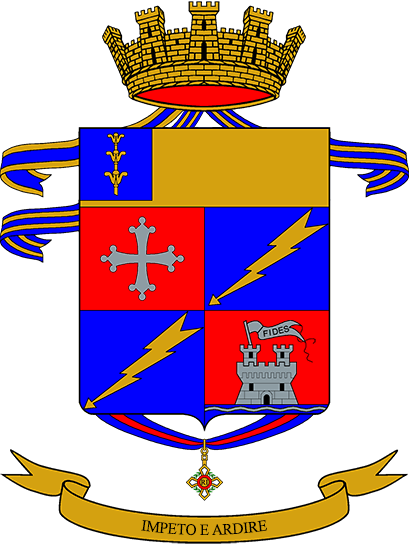
- Regimental coat of arms
- Active: 1 Sept. 1941 — 6 Nov. 1942; 1 Oct. 1975 — today
- Country: Italy
- Branch: Italian Army
- Part of: Paratroopers Brigade "Folgore"
- Garrison/HQ: Siena
- Motto: "Impeto e ardire"
- Anniversaries: 23 October 1942 - Second Battle of El Alamein
- Decorations: 1x Military Order of Italy; 1x Gold Medal of Military Valor; 2x Silver Medals of Army Valor

Insignia
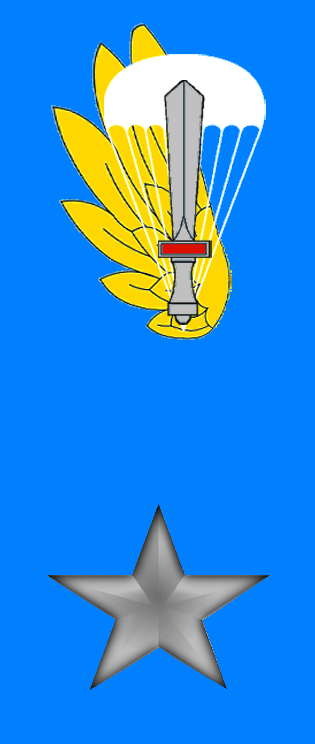
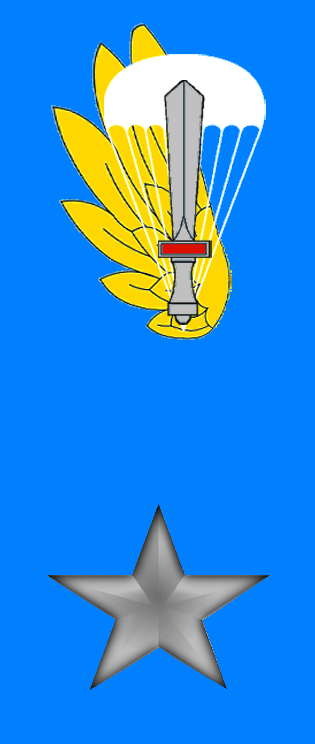
- Paratroopers gorget patches

The 186th Paratroopers Regiment "Folgore" (Italian: 186° Reggimento Paracadutisti "Folgore") is a paratroopers unit of the Italian Army based in Siena in Tuscany. The regiment is part of the Italian Army's infantry arm's Paracadutisti speciality and assigned to the Paratroopers Brigade "Folgore".

The 186th Infantry Regiment "Folgore" was formed in September 1941 as the Royal Italian Army's second paratroopers regiment. The regiment was assigned to the Paratroopers Division, which was intended to parachute onto Malta during the planned invasion of Malta. In July 1942, the invasion of Malta was postponed indefinitely. In September 1942, the "Folgore" division was sent to North Africa to reinforce the German-Italian Panzer Army Africa at El Alamein. In November 1942, the "Folgore" division and its regiments were destroyed during the Second Battle of El Alamein. For its conduct at El Alamein the 186th Infantry Regiment "Folgore" was awarded Italy's highest military honor the Gold Medal of Military Valor.

In 1957, the regiment's V Paratroopers Battalion was reformed and assigned to the 1st Paratroopers Tactical Group, which in 1963 was used to reform the 1st Paratroopers Regiment. In 1975, the 1st Paratroopers Regiment was disbanded and the V Paratroopers Battalion became an autonomous unit, which was renamed 5th Paratroopers Battalion "El Alamein". The battalion, which was based in Livorno and assigned to the Paratroopers Brigade "Folgore", received the flag and traditions of the 186th Infantry Regiment "Folgore". In 1992, the 5th Paratroopers Battalion "El Alamein" lost its autonomy and entered the reformed 186th Paratroopers Regiment "Folgore". The regiment's anniversary falls on 23 October 1942, the day the Second Battle of El Alamein began.

== History ==
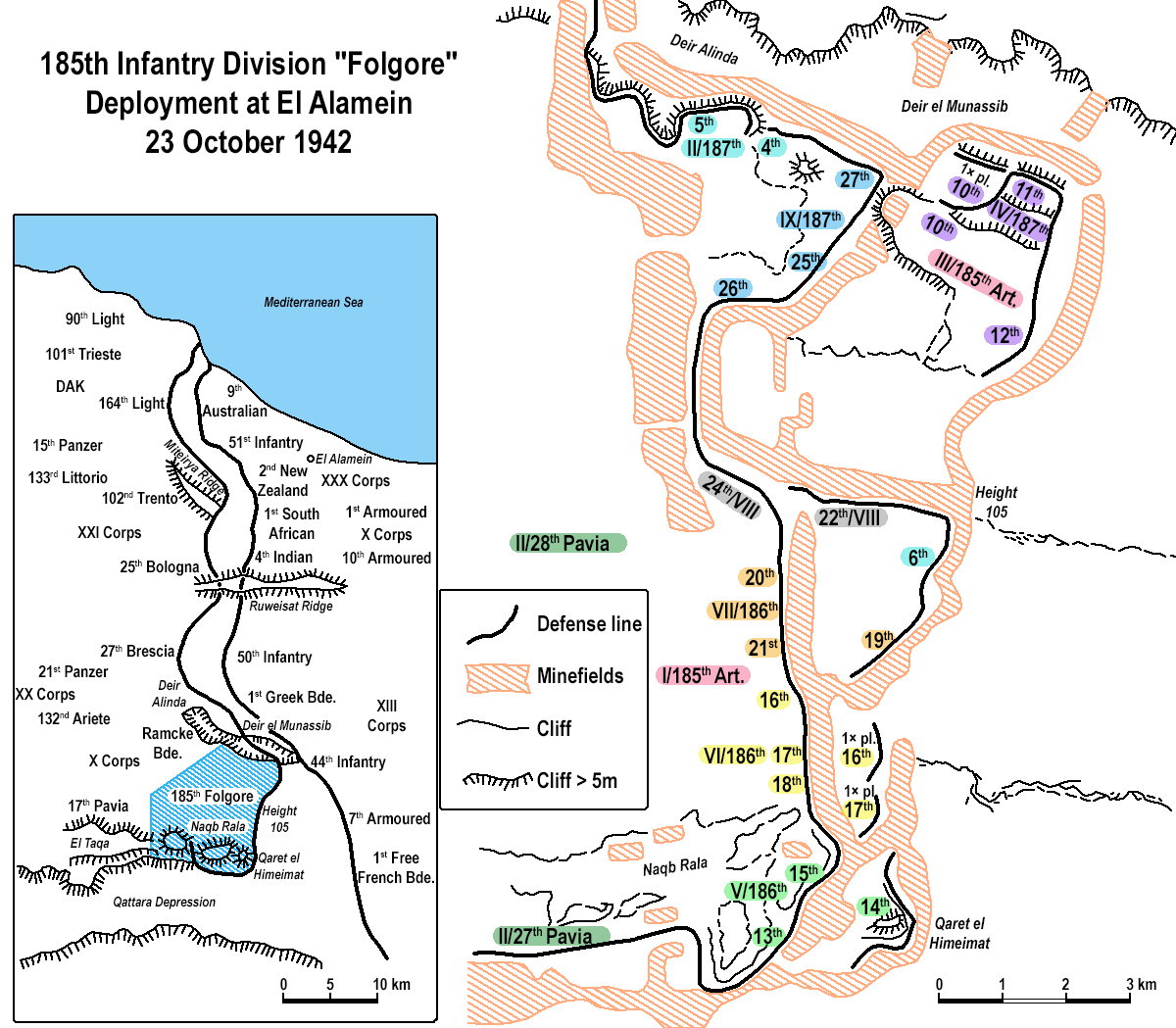
185th Infantry Division "Folgore" deployment on the eve of the Second Battle of El Alamein (click to enlarge)

=== World War II ===
On 1 September 1941, the Royal Italian Army formed the 2nd Paratroopers Regiment in Viterbo. The regiment consisted of a command, a command company, the V, VI, and VII paratroopers battalions, and the 2nd Cannons Company, which was equipped with 47/32 mod. 35 anti-tank guns. The regiment was assigned to the Paratroopers Division, which was formed in Tarquinia on the same date. The division was one of the Royal Italian Army units assigned to the planned invasion of Malta and after its formation the division began with the training for invasion. At the time the 1st Paratroopers regiment consisted of the following units:

- 2nd Paratroopers Regiment
  - Command Company
  - V Paratroopers Battalion
    - 13th, 14th, and 15th Company
  - VI Paratroopers Battalion
    - 16th, 17th, and 18th Company
  - VII Paratroopers Battalion
    - 19th, 20th, and 21st Company
  - 2nd Cannons Company (47/32 mod. 35 anti-tank guns)

On 10 March 1942, the Artillery Regiment for Paratroopers Division was formed and assigned to the Paratroopers Division, and five days later, on 15 March 1942, the 3rd Paratroopers Regiment was formed and assigned to the division. In July 1942, after the First Battle of El Alamein, the invasion of Malta was postponed indefinitely and the Royal Italian Army's General Staff decided to send the Paratroopers Division to North Africa to reinforce the depleted German-Italian Panzer Army Africa at El Alamein in Egypt. As the Paratroopers Division would operate in North Africa as an infantry formation, the division was renamed on 27 July 1942 185th Infantry Division "Folgore". On the same day, the 2nd Paratroopers Regiment was renamed 186th Infantry Regiment "Folgore", while the 1st Paratroopers Regiment was renamed 185th Infantry Regiment "Folgore", the 3rd Paratroopers Regiment was renamed 187th Infantry Regiment "Folgore", and the Artillery Regiment for Paratroopers Division was renamed 185th Artillery Regiment "Folgore". However, when the division deployed to North Africa, the 185th Infantry Regiment "Folgore" remained in Italy.

After arriving at El Alamein the "Folgore" division was sent to the extreme South of the Axis line between the Deir el Munassib depression and the Qaret el Himeimat hills, where the impassable Qattara Depression began. At the time the division fielded around 5,000 men and the 186th Infantry Regiment "Folgore" consisted of the following units:

- 186th Infantry Regiment "Folgore"
  - V Paratroopers Battalion
    - 13th, 14th, and 15th Company
  - VI Paratroopers Battalion
    - 16th, 17th, and 18th Company
  - VII Paratroopers Battalion
    - 19th, 20th, and 21st Company
  - 186th Cannons Company (47/32 mod. 35 anti-tank guns)

From 30 August to 5 September 1942, the "Folgore" division participated in General Erwin Rommel's unsuccessful attempt to outflank the British Eighth Army at El Alamein in the Battle of Alam el Halfa. On 29 September 1942, the British forces launched Operation Braganza against the paratroopers of the "Folgore" division, which, despite their numerical inferiority, managed to repulse the attack.

On 23 October 1942, the British Eighth Army began the Second battle of El Alamein. At the time the 186th Infantry Regiment held the southern half of the "Folgore" division's position. At 10:30 am on 25 October 1942, the British 7th Armoured Division, 44th Infantry Division, 50th Infantry Division, and the 1st Free French Brigade launched an all out attack from three sides against the "Folgore" division. By 3 am of 26 October, the Italian paratroopers had repulsed the attack and still held all their positions. On 2 November 1942, the "Folgore" division was ordered to retreat westwards, even though none of the division's positions had been lost to the British. During the night of 2 to 3 November 1942, the "Folgore" division began its retreat, leaving 1,100 dead behind. The "Folgore" division, which formed the Axis' rearguard, had no motorized transport and thus was forced to walk through the desert. However, on 6 November 1942, the remnants of the division were overtaken and surrounded by motorized British forces and forced to surrender. On 25 November 1942, the 185th Infantry Division "Folgore" and the division's regiments were declared lost due to wartime events.

For their conduct and sacrifice during the Western Desert campaign at El Alamein the three regiments of the 185th Infantry Division "Folgore" were awarded Italy's highest military honor, the Gold Medal of Military Valor.

With few survivors of the "Folgore" division the Royal Italian Army formed the CCLXXXV Paratroopers Battalion "Folgore", which fought in the Tunisian campaign on the Mareth Line. On 20–21 April 1943, the battalion was destroyed during the Battle of Takrouna.

=== Cold War ===
In 1952, the Italian Army's Military Parachuting Center in Pisa formed a paratroopers battalion, which in 1957 was reorganized as 1st Paratroopers Tactical Group. The group, which was based in Livorno, consisted of the II Paratroopers Battalion and V Paratroopers Battalion. On 1 January 1963, the Military Parachuting Center was reorganized as Paratroopers Brigade. On the same day, the 1st Paratroopers Tactical Group was renamed 1st Paratroopers Regiment and assigned to the brigade. The reformed regiment consisted of a command, a command company, the II Paratroopers Battalion, the V Paratroopers Battalion, and a mortar company. On 10 June 1967, the Paratroopers Brigade was renamed Paratroopers Brigade "Folgore".

During the 1975 army reform the Italian Army disbanded the regimental level and newly independent battalions were granted for the first time their own flags. On 30 September 1975, the 1st Paratroopers Regiment and the regiment's command company were disbanded. The next day, on 1 October 1975, the regiment's two battalions became autonomous units and were renamed 2nd Paratroopers Battalion "Tarquinia" and 5th Paratroopers Battalion "El Alamein", while the regiment's mortar company was split to form two new mortar companies, which were assigned to the two paratroopers battalions. The 5th Paratroopers Battalion, which had served with the 186th Infantry Regiment "Folgore" at El Alamein, was named for the Second Battle of El Alamein, durich which the 186th Infantry Regiment "Folgore" had distinguished itself and been awarded Italy's highest military honor the Gold Medal of Military Valor. The two battalions were assigned to the Paratroopers Brigade "Folgore". Both battalions consisted of a command, a command and services company, three paratroopers companies, and a heavy mortar company with towed 120mm Mod. 63 mortars and each of the two battalions fielded 879 men (41 officers, 95 non-commissioned officers, and 743 soldiers).

On 12 November 1976, the President of the Italian Republic Giovanni Leone assigned with decree 846 the flag and traditions of the 186th Infantry Regiment "Folgore" to the 5th Paratroopers Battalion "El Alamein".

In 1978, the 5th Paratroopers Battalion "El Alamein" moved from Livorno to Siena. In 1981, the Paratroopers Reconnaissance Company of the Paratroopers Brigade "Folgore" was reorganized as a standard paratroopers company and assigned to the battalion as 11th Paratroopers Company. Afterwards the 5th Paratroopers Battalion "El Alamein" consisted of the following units:

- 5th Paratroopers Battalion "El Alamein", in Siena
  - Command and Services Company
  - 11th Paratroopers Company
  - 13th Paratroopers Company
  - 14th Paratroopers Company
  - 15th Paratroopers Company
  - Mortar Company (120mm Mod. 63 mortars)

=== Recent times ===
Between May and July 1991, two companies of the battalion and two companies of the 9th Paratroopers Assault Battalion "Col Moschin" formed a paratroopers tactical group, which deployed to northern Iraq for the American-led Operation Provide Comfort.

On 15 September 1992, the 5th Paratroopers Battalion "El Alamein" lost its autonomy and the next day the battalion entered the reformed 186th Paratroopers Regiment "Folgore". On the same day, the flag and traditions of the 186th Infantry Regiment "Folgore" were transferred from the battalion to the reformed regiment. In 1993, the regiment was deployed to Somalia for the American-led Unified Task Force. On 2 July 1993, the regiment's 15th Paratroopers Company was ambushed by Somali National Alliance forces in the Battle of Checkpoint Pasta. For its conduct in Somalia the regiment was awarded a Silver Medal of Army Valor, which was affixed to the regiment's flag and added to its coat of arms.

In March 2004, interethnic unrest erupted in Kosovo and the regiment was sent there to bolster NATO's Kosovo Force. The regiment intervened quickly and decisively to help quell the unrest. For its conduct in Kosovo the regiment was awarded a Silver Medal of Army Valor, which was affixed to the regiment's flag and added to its coat of arms. In 2011, the regiment's mortar company transferred one of its mortar platoons to the 11th Paratroopers Company, which also added a reconnaissance platoon and an anti-tank guided missile platoon. Subsequently, the mortar company was disbanded, while the 11th Paratroopers Company was renamed 11th Paratroopers Maneuver Support Company. Between 2009 and 2021, the regiment deployed for combat missions to Afghanistan and Libya, and peacekeeping missions to Somalia. For its many deployments and its conduct during these deployments, the regiment was awarded in 2023 a Military Order of Italy, which was affixed to the regiment's flag and added to its coat of arms.

== Organization ==
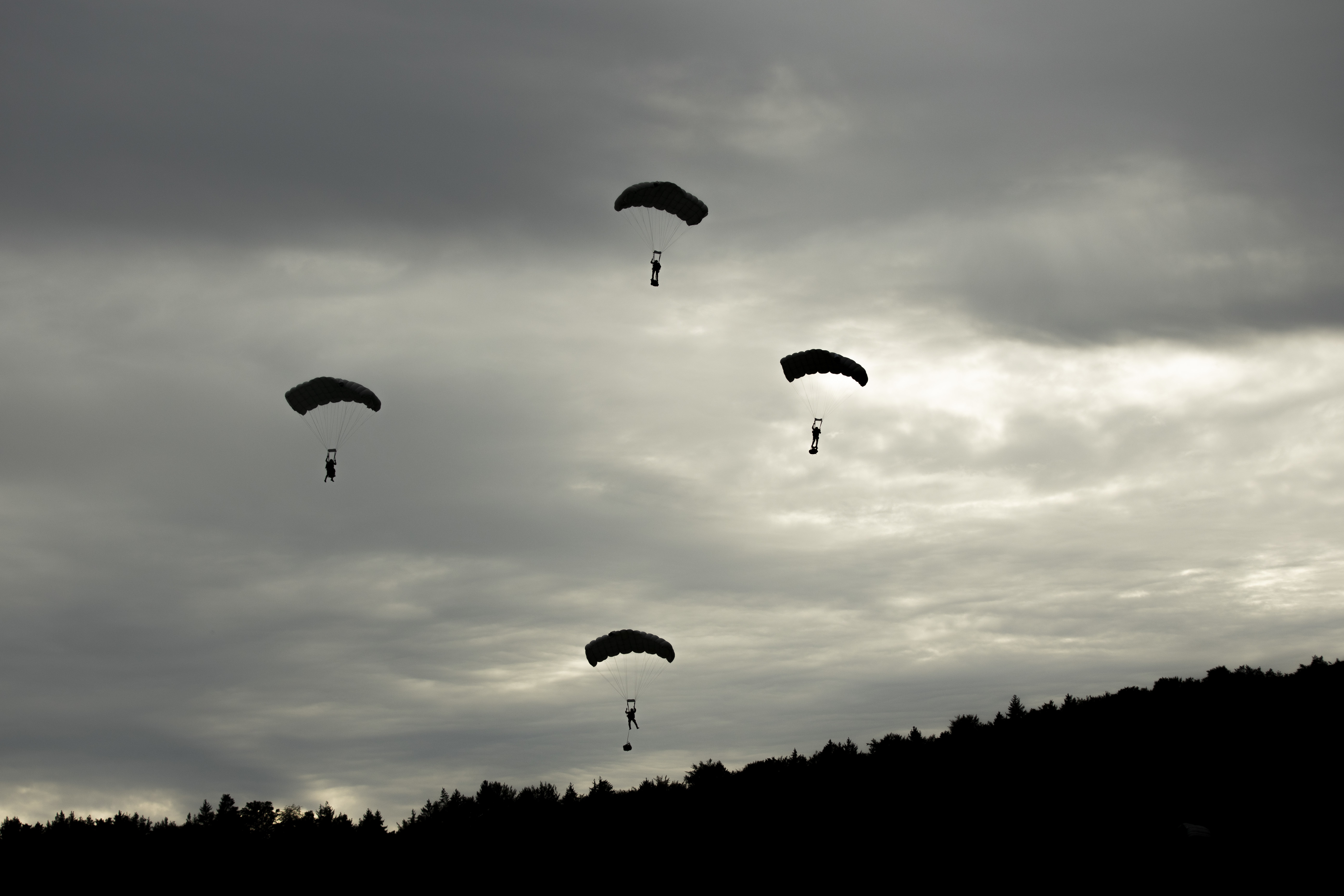
186th Paratroopers Regiment "Folgore" troops conduct airborne operations during Saber Junction 2019

As of 2024 the 186th Paratroopers Regiment "Folgore" is organized as follows:

- 186th Paratroopers Regiment "Folgore", in Siena
  - Command and Logistic Support Company
  - 5th Paratroopers Battalion "El Alamein"
    - 11th Paratroopers Maneuver Support Company
    - 13th Paratroopers Company
    - 14th Paratroopers Company
    - 15th Paratroopers Company

The regiment is equipped with VTLM Lince vehicles. The 11th Paratroopers Maneuver Support Company is equipped with 120mm mortars and Spike MR anti-tank guided missiles.

== See also ==
- Paratroopers Brigade "Folgore"
