= Paratroopers Brigade "Folgore" =

- Brigata Paracadutisti "Folgore"
- Coat of Arms the Paratroopers Brigade "Folgore"
- Active: 1 January 1963 – Today
- Country: Italy
- Branch: Italian Army
- Type: Airborne
- Role: Paratroopers; Light Infantry
- Size: Brigade
- Part of: Operational Land Forces Command
- Garrison/HQ: Livorno
- Colors: light blue
- March: Come Folgore dal Cielo (Like lightning from the sky)
- Mascot: Archangel Michael
- Anniversaries: 23 October (Second Battle of El Alamein)
- Engagements: Lebanon MNF; Kurdistan Operation Provide Comfort; Somalia UNITAF; Bosnia IFOR/SFOR; Kosovo KFOR; Iraq MNF-I; East Timor INTERFET; Lebanon UNIFIL II; Afghanistan ISAF

Commanders
- Current commander: Brigadier General Roberto Vergori

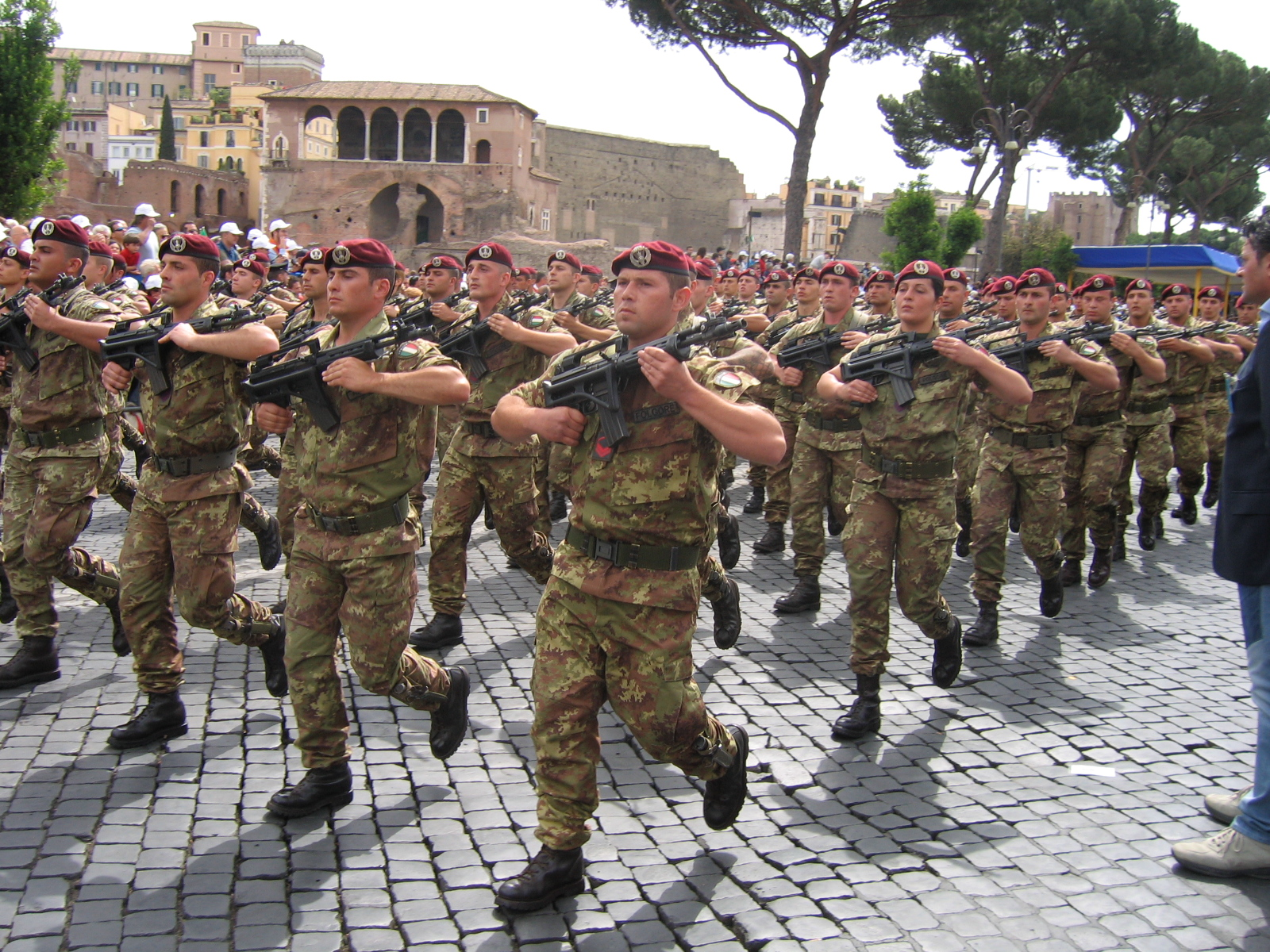
183rd Regiment parading in Rome on 2 June 2006

The Paratroopers Brigade "Folgore" is an airborne brigade of the Italian Army. Its core units are three battalions of paratroopers (paracadutisti). The name "Folgore" is Italian for lightning. The Folgore is one of three light infantry brigades of the Italian Army. While the Folgore specializes in parachute operations its sister brigade the Airmobile Brigade Friuli specializes in helicopter assault operations. The Folgore and its units are based in Tuscany, Veneto and Lazio.

== History ==
=== World War II ===
The first Italian paratrooper units were trained and formed shortly before World War II in Castel Benito, near Tripoli in Libya, where the first Military Parachuting School was located. Later the school was moved to Tarquinia in Italy.

On 1 September 1941 the Royal Italian Army raised the 1st Paratroopers Division in Tarquinia. The division initially was organized as follows:

- 1st Paratroopers Division
  - 1st Paratroopers Infantry Regiment (raised 1 April 1941)
    - II Paratroopers Battalion
    - III Paratroopers Battalion
    - IV Paratroopers Battalion
    - Cannons Company (47/32 cannons)
  - 2nd Paratroopers Infantry Regiment (raised 1 September 1941)
    - V Paratroopers Battalion
    - VI Paratroopers Battalion
    - VII Paratroopers Battalion
    - Cannons Company (47/32 cannons)
  - I Paratroopers Artillery Group (47/32 cannons, raised 28 August 1941)

For reasons of order of precedence the title I Paratroopers Battalion was reserved for the I Carabinieri Paratroopers Battalion. The division was intended to be used in Operation Hercules – the planned Axis invasion of Malta. On 30 April 1941 the Italian paratroopers were deployed for the first time when the II Paratroopers Battalion jumped onto Cephalonia.

In 1942 the division was further augmented: on 15 January the II Paratroopers Artillery Group was raised, followed by the III Paratroopers Artillery Group on 10 March. On the same date the Paratroopers Division Artillery Regiment was activated. The regiment took command of the three paratroopers artillery groups, which each fielded two batteries with four 47/32 cannons per battery. On 15 March 1942 the 3rd Paratroopers Infantry Regiment with the battalions VIII, IX, and X was raised in Tarquinia.

On 27 July 1942 the division's name was changed to 185th Infantry Division "Folgore" and its regiments were renumbered and renamed as well. The new structure was as follows:

- 185th Infantry Division "Folgore"
  - 185th Infantry Regiment "Folgore"
    - II Paratroopers Battalion
    - III Paratroopers Battalion
    - IV Paratroopers Battalion
    - Cannons Company (47/32 cannons)
  - 186th Infantry Regiment "Folgore"
    - V Paratroopers Battalion
    - VI Paratroopers Battalion
    - VII Paratroopers Battalion
    - Cannons Company (47/32 cannons)
  - 187th Infantry Regiment "Folgore"
    - VIII Paratroopers Battalion (re-roled as Paratroopers Sapper unit in May 1942)
    - IX Paratroopers Battalion
    - X Paratroopers Battalion
    - Cannons Company (47/32 cannons)
  - 185th Artillery Regiment "Folgore"
    - I Paratroopers Artillery Group (47/32 cannons)
    - II Paratroopers Artillery Group (47/32 cannons)
    - III Paratroopers Artillery Group (47/32 cannons)
    - Regimental Services Battery

The division was then sent to Italian Libya to bolster Axis forces in the Western Desert campaign. Before the departing for North Africa the 185th Infantry Regiment "Folgore" and 187th Infantry Regiment "Folgore" switched units: the 185th ceded the more experienced II and IV to 187th, which in turn ceded the VIII and X to the 185th. When the division arrived in Africa the three artillery groups of the 185th Artillery Regiment "Folgore" were merged into two artillery groups of three batteries each, thus providing one group for each infantry regiment, which in turn could now provide one battery to each battalion of a regiment. Additionally a seventh battery was formed with surplus materiel found by the division during its transfer to the front.

On 15 September the 185th Infantry Regiment "Folgore", which had remained in Italy, left the division and changed its name to 185th Infantry Regiment "Nembo" and became the basis for the 184th Infantry Division "Nembo" (Nemo Italian for Nimbus). To aid in the raising of the 183rd Infantry Regiment "Nembo" the 185th ceded its X Paratroopers Battalion to the 183rd and raised the XI Paratroopers Battalion in its stead.

In North Africa the division participated in the First and Second Battle of El Alamein. During the latter division put up a fierce defense against advancing Allied forces, managing to drive off repeated assaults conducted by tanks and infantry working in unison. However, in the course of the battle the division was annihilated and declared lost on 23 November 1942.

After the Armistice of Cassibile between the Allies and Italy most of the troops of the "Nembo" stationed on Sardinia decided to side with Italian King Victor Emmanuel III and began to fight the retreating German troops. Subsequently, the remnants of the "Nembo" were used to form the Combat Group "Folgore" of the Italian Co-Belligerent Army in 1944. The combat group was equipped with British materiel and uniforms and fought as part of the British XIII Corps in Italian Campaign.

During the war the fascist regime in Northern Italy fielded the 1st Parachute Arditi Regiment "Folgore", which also fielded a "Nembo" and a "Folgore" battalion.

=== Cold War ===
After World War II the Combat Group "Folgore" became one of the Italian Army's first divisions and by 1954 one of the strongest. The Infantry Division "Folgore" was mechanized infantry unit based in the North-eastern Italian city of Treviso. Airborne troops and operations were to be performed by the Military Parachuting Centre in Pisa.

On 1 January 1963 the Military Parachuting Center was reorganized and renamed Paratroopers Brigade, which consisted of the 1st Paratroopers Regiment with the II and V paratroopers battalions, the Paratroopers Saboteurs Battalion, a Carabinieri Paratroopers Company, which was expanded to battalion on 15 July 1963 and a Paratroopers Field Artillery Battery, which was expanded to group on 1 June 1963 and armed with Mod56 105 mm howitzers, and the Paratroopers Training Center. On 1 April 1964 the brigade lost the Paratroopers Training Center in Pisa to the army's Infantry and Cavalry Inspectorate. On 10 June 1967 the Paratroopers Brigade was renamed Paratroopers Brigade "Folgore".

With the Italian Army 1975 reform the army abolished the regimental level and re-organised its brigades. Therefore, the "Folgore" brigade's 1st Paratroopers Regiment disbanded on 1 October 1975 and its two battalions became the 2nd Paratroopers Battalion "Tarquinia'" and the 5th Paratroopers Battalion "El Alamein". After the reform the brigade was structured as follows:

- Paratroopers Brigade "Folgore", in Livorno
  - Paratroopers Command and Signal Unit "Folgore", in Livorno
  - 1st Carabinieri Paratroopers Battalion "Tuscania", in Livorno
  - 2nd Paratroopers Battalion "Tarquinia", in Livorno
  - 3rd Paratroopers Battalion "Poggio Rusco" (Recruits Training), in Pisa
  - 5th Paratroopers Battalion "El Alamein", in Livorno (moved to Siena in 1978)
  - 9th Paratroopers Assault Battalion "Col Moschin", in Livorno
  - 185th Paratroopers Field Artillery Group "Viterbo", in Livorno (M56 105 mm towed howitzers)
  - Paratroopers Logistic Battalion "Folgore", in Pisa
  - 26th Light Airplanes and Helicopters Squadrons Group "Giove", at Pisa-San Giusto Air Base
    - Command and Services Squadron
    - 426th Reconnaissance Helicopters Squadron (AB 206 reconnaissance helicopters)
    - 526th Multirole Helicopters Squadron (AB 204B/205 multirole helicopters)
  - Paratroopers Pathfinder Company "Folgore", in Siena
  - Paratroopers Anti-tank Company "Folgore", in Livorno (BGM-71 TOW anti-tank guided missiles)
  - Paratroopers Engineer Company "Folgore", in Lucca

In 1982 the brigade deployed in Italy's first international mission abroad since World War II, when it joined the Multinational Force in Lebanon and on 1 January 1983 the Military Parachuting School in Pisa with the 3rd Paratroopers (Recruits Training) Battalion "Poggio Rusco" returned to the brigade .

On 1 January 1986, the "Folgore" brigade and the Motorized Brigade "Friuli", in conjunction with some units of the Army's Light Army Aviation and the Navy's San Marco Regiment, became the Rapid Intervention Forces of the Italian Military, deployable on short notice for out of area missions. On 31 October of the same year the army disbanded the Mechanized Division "Folgore", leaving the Paratroopers Brigade "Folgore" as only heir of the name and traditions associated with the name "Folgore".

In 1991 tactical group of the brigade was sent to Kurdistan as part of the Operation Provide Comfort. The same year the army disbanded seven combat brigades as the Cold War had ended. On 31 May 1991 the "Folgore" received the 183rd Mechanized Infantry Battalion "Nembo" from the Mechanized Brigade "Gorizia", which subsequently was re-roled as a paratroopers battalion. Beginning in 1992 the battalions returned to their regimental names. The brigade's new structure was as follows:

- Paratroopers Brigade "Folgore", in Livorno
  - Command and Signal Unit "Folgore", in Livorno
  - 1st Carabinieri Paratroopers Regiment "Tuscania", in Livorno
  - 9th Paratroopers Assault Regiment "Col Moschin", in Livorno
  - 183rd Paratroopers Regiment "Nembo", in Pistoia
  - 186th Paratroopers Regiment "Folgore", in Siena (former 5th Paratroopers Battalion)
  - 187th Paratroopers Regiment "Folgore", in Livorno (former 2nd Paratroopers Battalion)
  - 185th Paratroopers Artillery Regiment "Folgore", in Livorno, with Mod56 105 mm howitzers
  - Paratroopers Logistic Battalion "Folgore", in Pisa
  - Military Parachuting School, in Pisa
  - 26th Light Airplanes and Helicopters Squadron "Giove", at San Giusto Air Base
  - Paratroopers Engineer Company "Folgore", in Lucca

On 3 December 1992 the brigade deployed for a year to Somalia as part of Operation Restore Hope (later Unified Task Force). There the brigade was engaged in a battle on 2 July 1993 where it lost three men and a further 36 were injured. The three deceased soldiers were each awarded the Gold Medal of Military Valor for their conduct during the battle.

=== After the Cold War ===
On 1 October 1997, the brigades passed to the Projection Forces Command (Comando Forze di Proiezione or COMFOP), which commanded all rapid-deployable units of the Italian Army. However, on 1 December 2000 the brigade passed to the 1st Defence Forces Command (1° Comando Forze di Difesa or COMFOD 1°) and received the 5th Engineer Battalion "Bolsena" in Legnano, which was renamed as 8th Engineer Regiment "Folgore" and incorporated the brigade's Paratroopers Engineer Company "Folgore". The same year on 31 August the 185th Paratroopers Artillery Regiment "Folgore" retired its howitzers and began its conversion to a Long Range Reconnaissance Patrol Special Operations unit.

In March 2001, the brigade lost its logistic battalion and the 26th Light Airplanes and Helicopters Squadron "Giove" and when in 2002 the Carabinieri were separated from the Army to become the Fourth Armed Force of Italy the 1st Carabinieri Paratroopers Regiment "Tuscania" left the brigade. From April to September 2005 the brigade was employed in Iraq as part of the Multi-National Force – Iraq. In 2007 the brigade sent a task force to East Timor as part of International Force for East Timor, while the majority of its units deployed to Lebanon as part of United Nations Interim Force in Lebanon II. The brigade deployed twice to Afghanistan in support of ISAF – once in 2009 and once in 2011

== Organization ==
Paratroopers Brigade "Folgore" units in 2025
- 185th Paratroopers Artillery Regiment "Folgore" in Bracciano, Lazio
- 8th Paratroopers Engineer Regiment "Folgore" in Legnago, Veneto

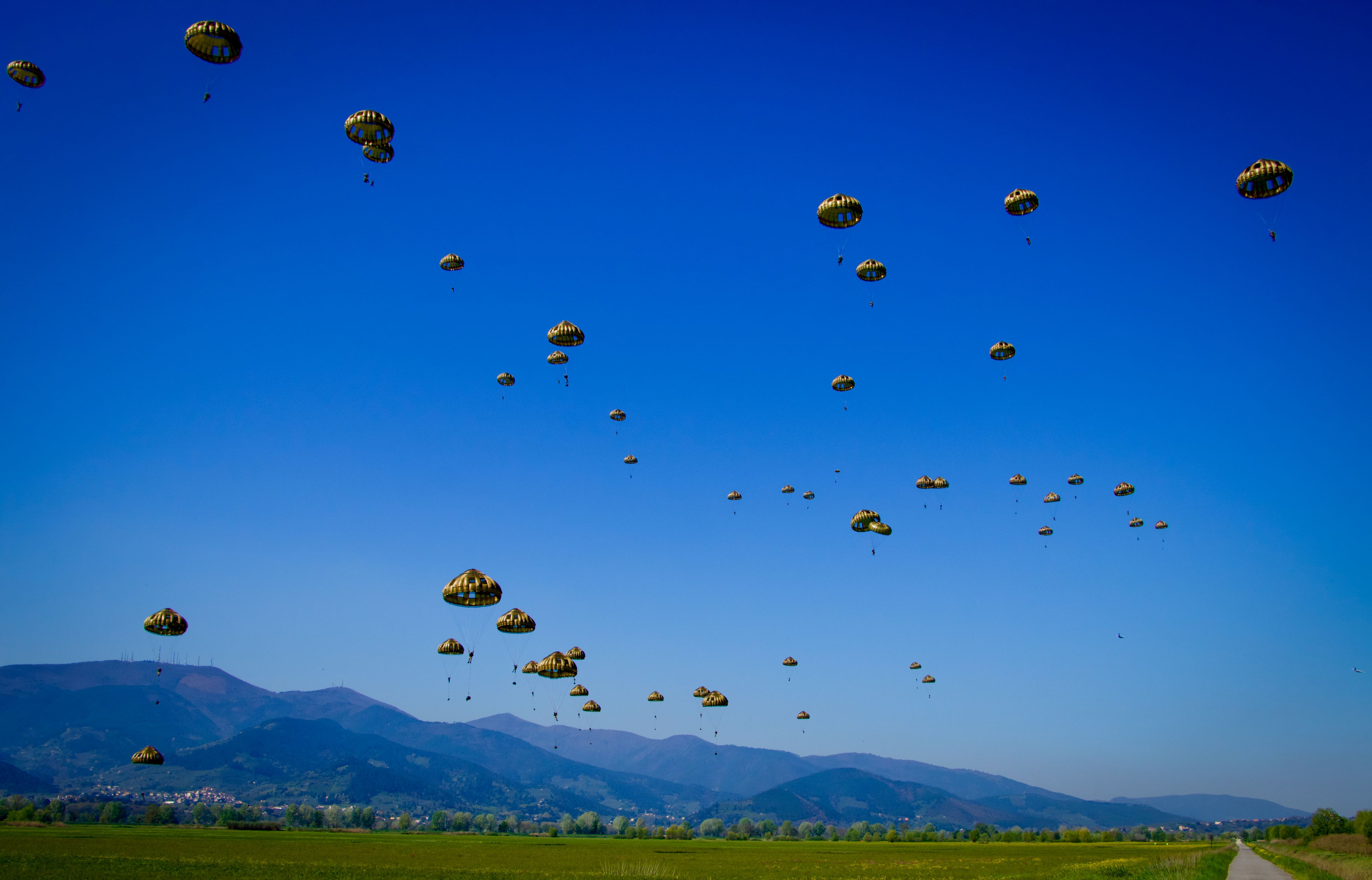
Paratroopers Brigade "Folgore" paratroopers during an exercise with the Italian Air Force's 46th Air Brigade

With the 2013 reform the "Folgore" changed its composition significantly. The brigade lost its two special forces units which both passed to the Army Special Forces Command (COMFOSE) in Pisa. In return the brigade received the Regiment "Savoia Cavalleria" (3rd) from the Airmobile Brigade "Friuli", the 33rd Self-propelled Field Artillery Regiment "Acqui" from the Mechanized Brigade "Granatieri di Sardegna" and the 6th Logistic Regiment from the disbanded Logistic Projection Command. Upon entering the brigade the 33rd Artillery Regiment was renamed as 185th Paratroopers Artillery Regiment "Folgore", while the 6th Logistic Regiment was renamed as Logistic Regiment "Folgore". As of 4 October 2022 the brigade consists of the following units:

- Paratroopers Brigade "Folgore", in Livorno (Tuscany)
  - 184th Paratroopers Command and Tactical Supports Unit "Nembo", in Livorno
  - Regiment "Savoia Cavalleria" (3rd), in Grosseto (Tuscany) with Centauro tank destroyers
  - 183rd Paratroopers Regiment "Nembo", in Pistoia (Tuscany) with VTLM Lince vehicles
  - 186th Paratroopers Regiment "Folgore", in Siena (Tuscany) with VTLM Lince vehicles
  - 187th Paratroopers Regiment "Folgore", in Livorno (Tuscany) with VTLM Lince vehicles
  - 185th Paratroopers Artillery Regiment "Folgore", in Bracciano (Lazio) with 120mm mortars and FH-70 towed howitzers
  - 8th Paratroopers Engineer Regiment "Folgore", in Legnago (Veneto)
  - Logistic Regiment "Folgore", in Pisa (Tuscany)
  - Parachuting Training Center, in Pisa (Tuscany)

The composition of the brigade is identical to the composition of the Alpine Brigade "Julia" and Alpine Brigade "Taurinense", the other light brigades of the Italian Army.

== Equipment ==
The paratrooper regiments are equipped with Lince light multirole vehicles. The maneuver support companies of the paratrooper regiments are equipped with 120 mm mortars and Spike anti-tank guided missile systems. The cavalry regiment is equipped with Centauro tank destroyers and VTLM Lince vehicles. The brigade's artillery regiment is equipped with 18x 120 mm mortars.

== Gorget patches ==
The personnel of the brigade's units wears the following gorget patches:

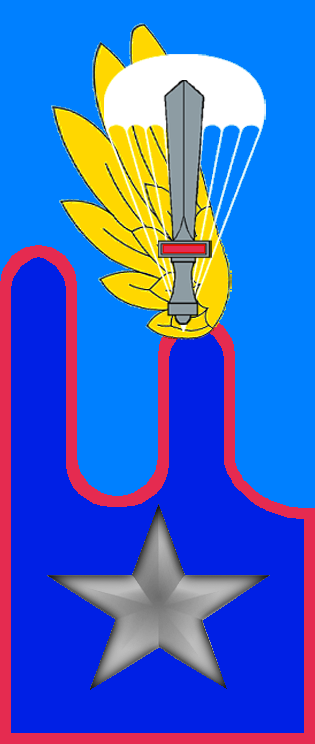
184th Paratroopers Command and Tactical Supports Unit "Nembo"

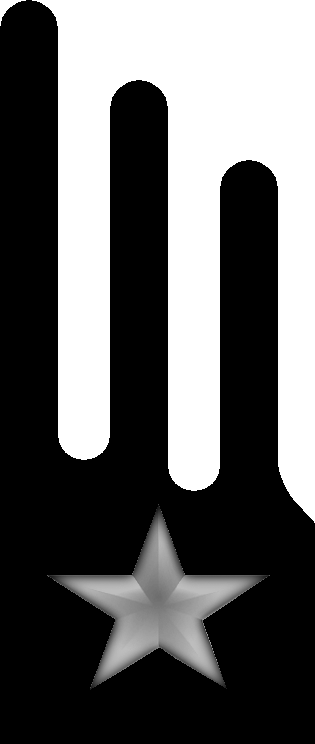
Regiment "Savoia Cavalleria" (3rd)

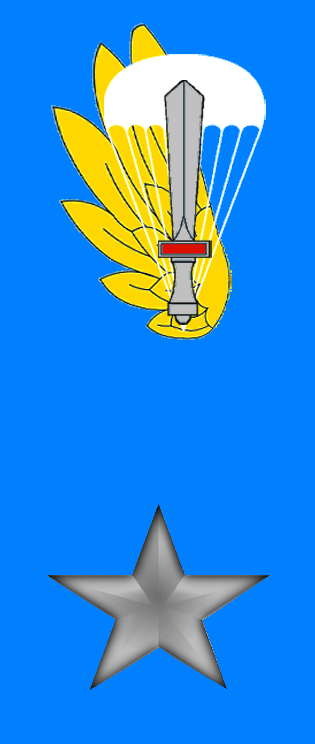
183rd Paratroopers Regiment "Nembo"

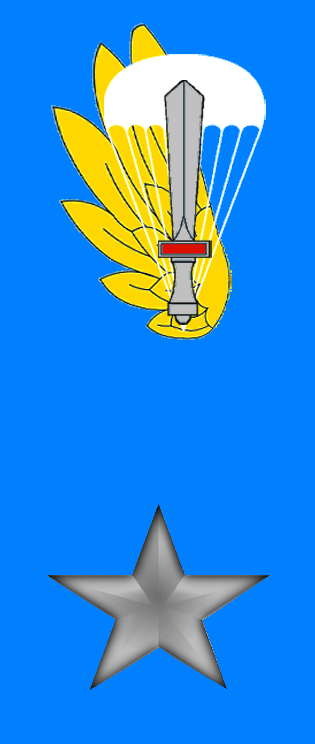
186th Paratroopers Regiment "Folgore"

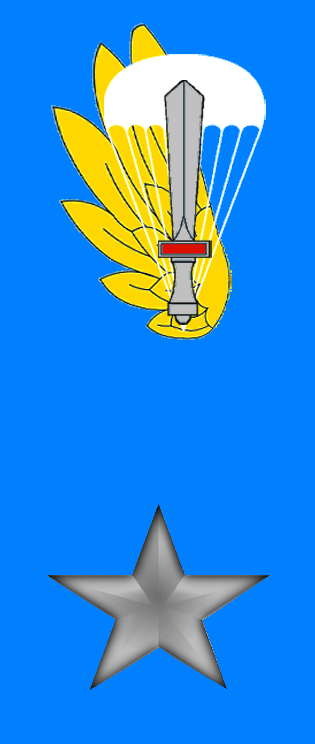
187th Paratroopers Regiment "Folgore"

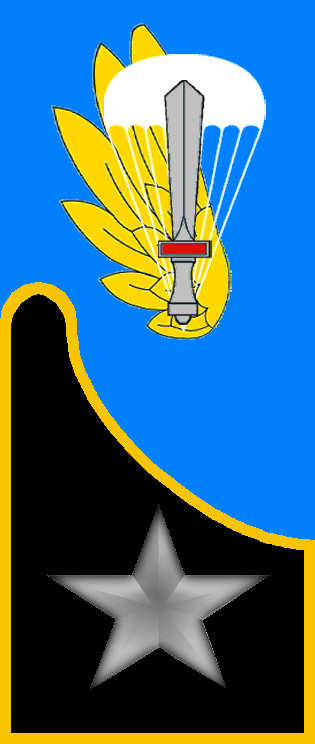
185th Paratroopers Artillery Regiment "Folgore"

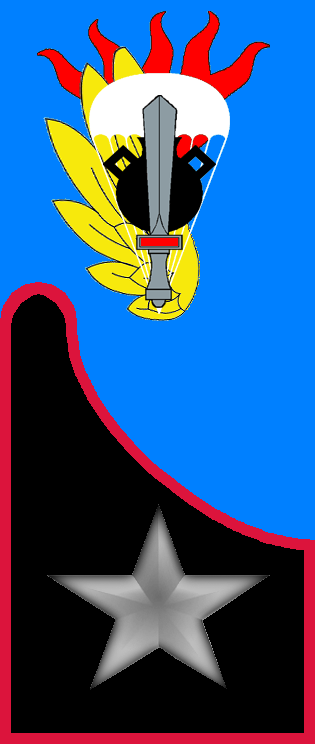
8th Paratroopers Engineer Regiment "Folgore"

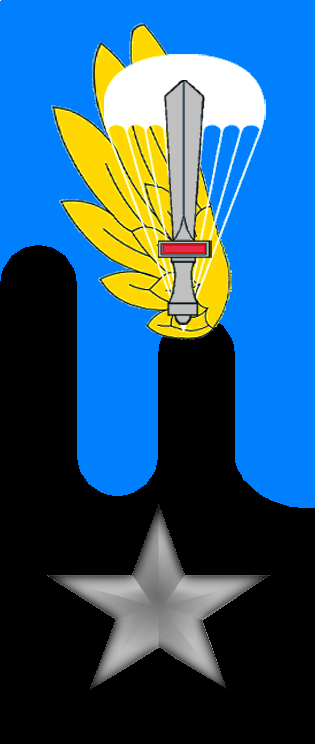
Logistic Regiment "Folgore"

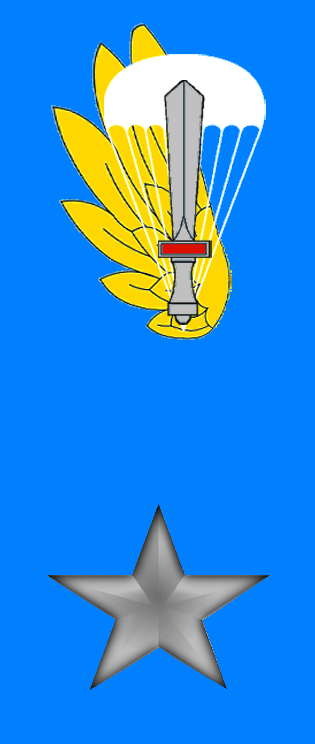
Parachuting Training Center

== See also ==
- 1971 RAF Hercules crash
