= 185th Paratroopers Artillery Regiment "Folgore" =

Active Italian Army airborne artillery unit

- 185° Reggimento Artiglieria Paracadutisti "Folgore"
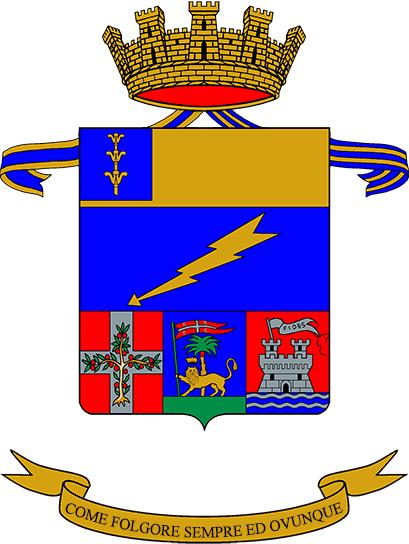
- Regimental coat of arms
- Active: 10 March 1942 – 8 Dec. 1942; 1 Oct. 1975 – 31 Aug. 2000; 21 June 2013 – today
- Country: Italy
- Branch: Italian Army
- Role: Airborne artillery
- Part of: Paratroopers Brigade "Folgore"
- Garrison/HQ: Bracciano
- Motto: "Come folgore sempre e dovunque"
- Anniversaries: 15 June 1918 – Second Battle of the Piave River
- Decorations: 1× Gold Medal of Military Valor; 1× Silver Medal of Army Valor

Insignia
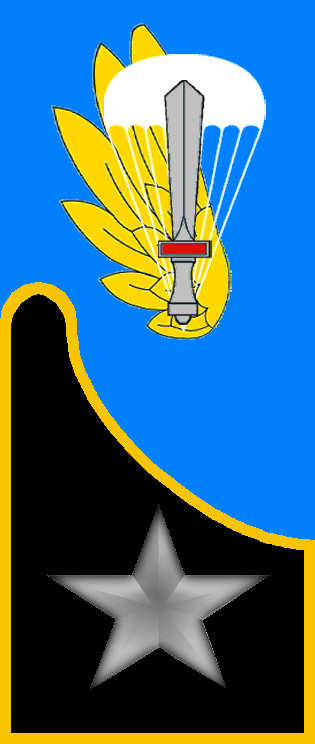
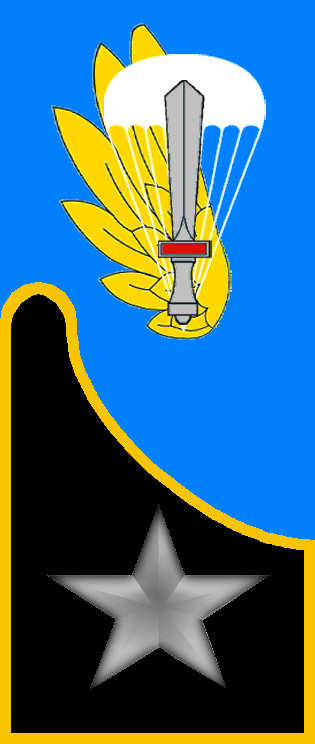
- 185th Paratroopers Artillery Regiment "Folgore" gorget patches

The 185th Paratroopers Artillery Regiment "Folgore (Italian: 185° Reggimento Artiglieria Paracadutisti "Folgore") is an artillery regiment of the Italian Army, specializing in airborne operations. Originally an artillery regiment of the Royal Italian Army, the regiment was assigned in World War II to the 185th Infantry Division "Folgore", with which the regiment was deployed to North Africa for the Western Desert campaign, during which division and regiment were destroyed in the Second Battle of El Alamein. Reformed in 1975 the regiment is today based in Bracciano near Rome and assigned to the Paratroopers Brigade "Folgore". The regimental anniversary falls, as for all Italian Army artillery regiments, on June 15, the beginning of the Second Battle of the Piave River in 1918.

== History ==
=== World War II ===
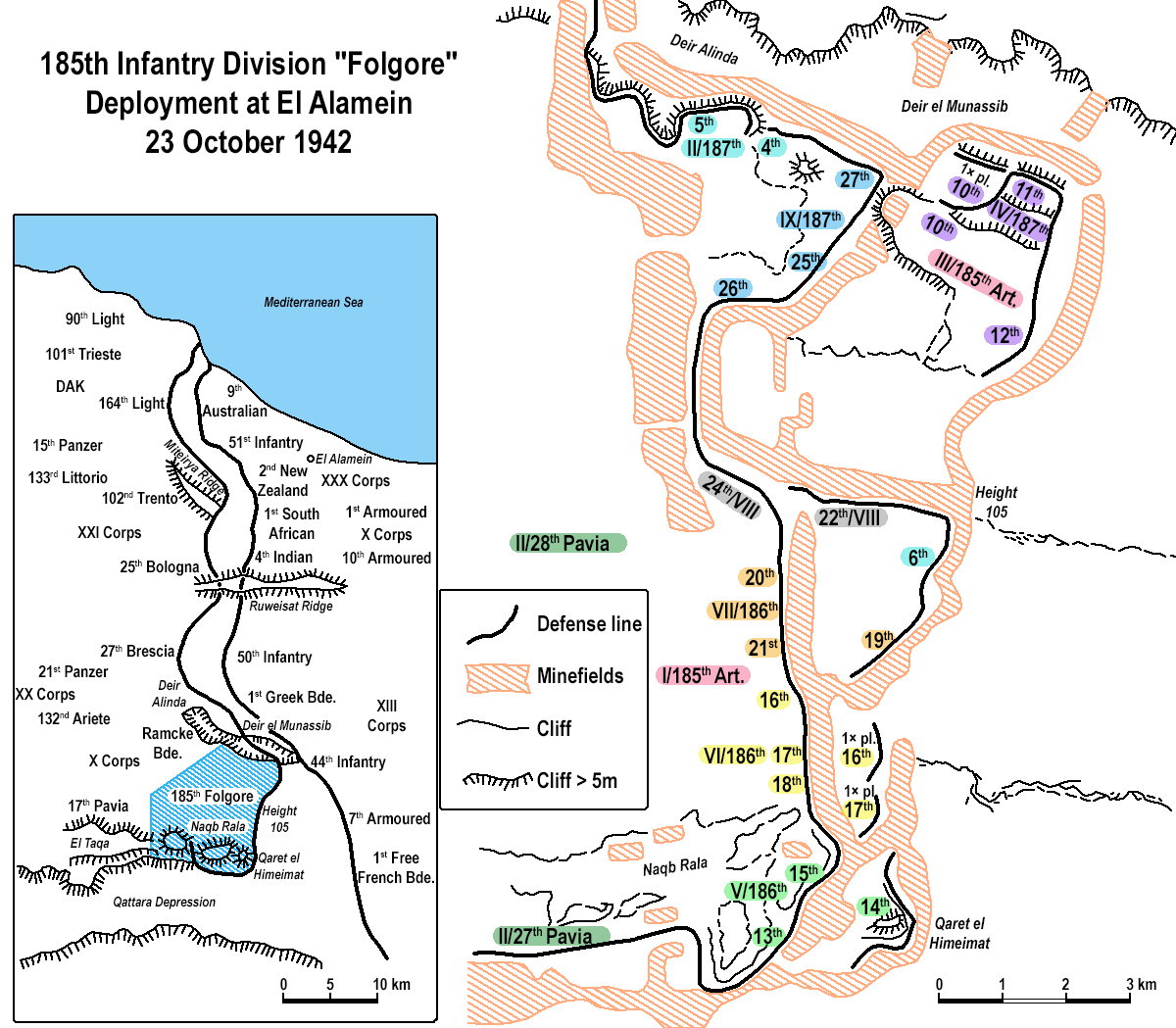
185th Infantry Division "Folgore" deployment on the eve of the Second Battle of El Alamein (click to enlarge)

The first Italian paratroopers artillery unit, the I Paratroopers Artillery Group, was formed on 16 August 1941 by the Italian Royal Air Force Paratroopers School in Tarquinia. The group was equipped with 47/32 mod. 35 anti-tank guns. On 15 January 1942 the II Paratroopers Artillery Group was formed, followed by the III Paratroopers Artillery Group on 10 March 1942. On the same date the command of the Artillery Regiment for Paratroopers Division and the Services Battery were formed. The regiment was assigned to the Paratroopers Division and fielded 24× 47/32 mod. 35 anti-tank guns: eight per group, which each consisted of two batteries of four cannons.

On 27 July the Paratroopers Division was renamed 185th Infantry Division "Folgore" and the artillery regiment was renamed 185th Artillery Regiment "Folgore". The division, which also included the 185th Infantry Regiment "Folgore", 186th Infantry Regiment "Folgore", and 187th Infantry Regiment "Folgore", was intended to be used in Operation Hercules – the planned Axis invasion of Malta, but in August 1942 the division was transferred to Libya to bolster Axis forces in the Western Desert campaign. From 30 August to 5 September 1942 the division fought in the Battle of Alam el Halfa.

On 23 October 1942 the British commenced the Second battle of El Alamein. After heavy fighting the Folgore received on 2 November the order to retreat westwards and form the Axis' rearguard. On 6 November the remnants of the division were overtaken and surrounded by motorized British forces and forced to surrender. On 25 November 1942 the Folgore division was declared lost due to wartime events and on 8 December the 185th Artillery Regiment "Folgore" was officially disbanded.

On 26 March 1963 the President of Italy Antonio Segni awarded the 185th Paratroopers Artillery Regiment "Folgore" for its conduct and sacrifice during the Western Desert Campaign and in the Second Battle of El Alamein Italy's highest military honor, the Gold Medal of Military Valor, which was affixed to the regiment's flag and is depicted on the regiment's coat of arms.

=== Cold War ===
On 1 July 1958 the Paratroopers Field Artillery Battery was formed in Livorno. The battery was equipped with four Mod 56 105mm pack howitzers and assigned to the 1st Paratroopers Tactical Group, which on 1 January 1963 was expanded to Paratroopers Brigade. On 1 June of the same year the battery was expanded to the Paratroopers Field Artillery Group and consisted of a command, a command unit, and two batteries Mod 56 105mm pack howitzers. On 16 December 1966 the group received the flag of the 185th Artillery Regiment "Folgore" in "temporary custody" to perpetuate the traditions of the disbanded regiment. The same year the group moved from Livorno to Pisa, a move that was reversed in 1968.

As part of the 1975 army reform the Paratroopers Field Artillery Group was renamed 185th Paratroopers Field Artillery Group "Viterbo" on 1 October 1975. To avoid confusion with the support units of the Mechanized Division "Folgore" and the Paratroopers Brigade "Folgore" the group was named for the city of Viterbo, where the first Italian paratrooper units had been trained by the Royal Italian Air Force's Paratroopers School. On 2 December of the same year the group raised a third howitzer battery, while the command unit was expanded to Command and Services Battery. The group fielded now 18× Mod 56 105mm pack howitzers and had a complement of 462 men (39 officers, 56 non-commissioned officers, and 367 soldiers).

On 12 November 1976 the President of the Italian Republic Giovanni Leone assigned with decree 846 the flag and traditions of the 185th Artillery Regiment "Folgore" to the group.

In 1981 the group received 18 F1 120mm mortars, allowing the group to deploy either with howitzers or mortars or a mix of the two. In 1982 a battery of the artillery group participated in the United Nations Interim Force in Lebanon. On 1 July 1988 the group raised the Anti-aircraft Battery "Scorpioni", which was equipped with FIM-92 Stinger man-portable air-defense systems. In spring 1991 the group contributed to the Paratroopers Tactical Group, which deployed to Northern Iraq in the aftermath of Operation Desert Storm.

On 8 September 1992 the group lost its autonomy and the next day it entered reformed 185th Paratroopers Field Artillery Regiment "Folgore" as 1st Paratroopers Artillery Group. The organization of the regiment at that time was as follows:

- Regimental Command, in Livorno
  - Command and Services Battery "Leoni"
  - Anti-aircraft Battery "Scorpioni"
  - 1st Paratroopers Artillery Group
    - 1st Howitzer/Mortar Battery "Draghi"
    - 2nd Howitzer/Mortar Battery "Le Aquile"
    - 3rd Howitzer/Mortar Battery "Diavoli"
    - Fire Direction and Technical Support Battery "Levrieri"

The regiment also increased the number of howitzers and mortars in each battery from six to eight.

From April to September 1993 the group participated in the Unified Task Force in Somalia. For its conduct and service in Somalia the group was awarded a Silver Medal of Army Valor, which was affixed to the battalion's flag and is depicted on the regiment's coat of arms.

=== Recent times ===
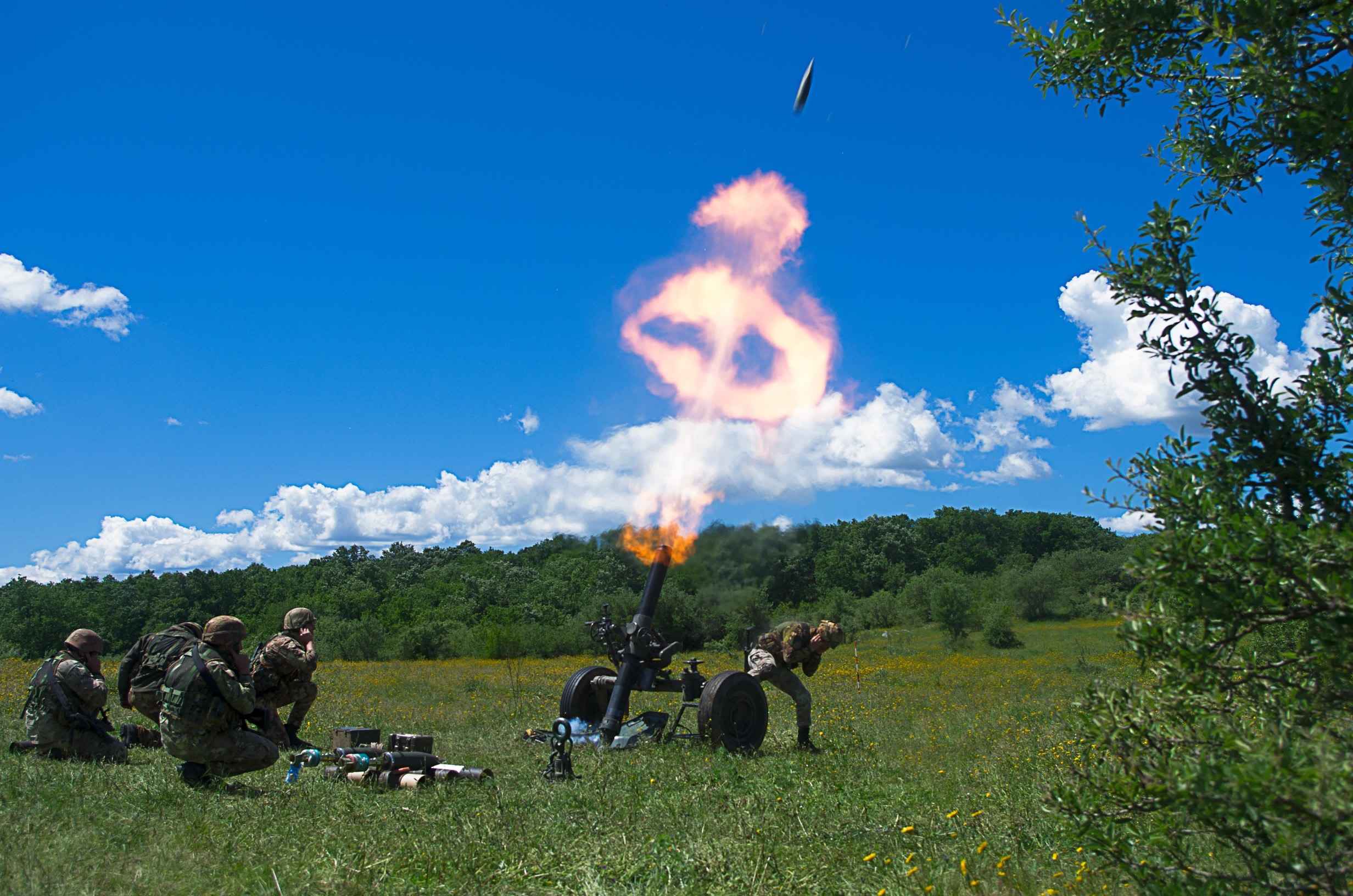
Paratroopers of the 185th fire their mortar during an exercise

In winter 1999–2000 the regiment was transformed into a special operations reconnaissance unit and therefore on 31 August 2000 the Anti-aircraft Battery and the Fire Direction and Technical Support Battery were disbanded, while the regiment changed its name to 185th Field Artillery Regiment (Paratroopers Target Acquisition) "Folgore". The regiment's new structure was as follows:

- Regimental Command, in Livorno
  - Command and Services Battery "Leoni"
  - 1st Target Acquisition Group
    - 1st Target Acquirers Battery "Draghi"
    - 2nd Target Acquirers Battery "Le Aquile"
    - 3rd Target Acquirers Battery "Diavoli"
    - 4th Long Range Reconnaissance Patrol Battery "Diavoli" (ceded in July 2003 by the 9th Paratroopers Assault Regiment "Col Moschin"

Due to its new role the regiment changed its name in 2004 to 185th Paratroopers Reconnaissance Target Acquisition Regiment "Folgore".

On 21 June 2013 the 185th Paratroopers Artillery Regiment "Folgore" was reformed as artillery unit in Bracciano and received its flag from the 185th Paratroopers Reconnaissance Target Acquisition Regiment "Folgore", which in turn received the flag of the 185th Paratroopers Regiment "Nembo", which had served with the Italian Co-Belligerent Army during the Italian campaign of World War II.

== Organization ==
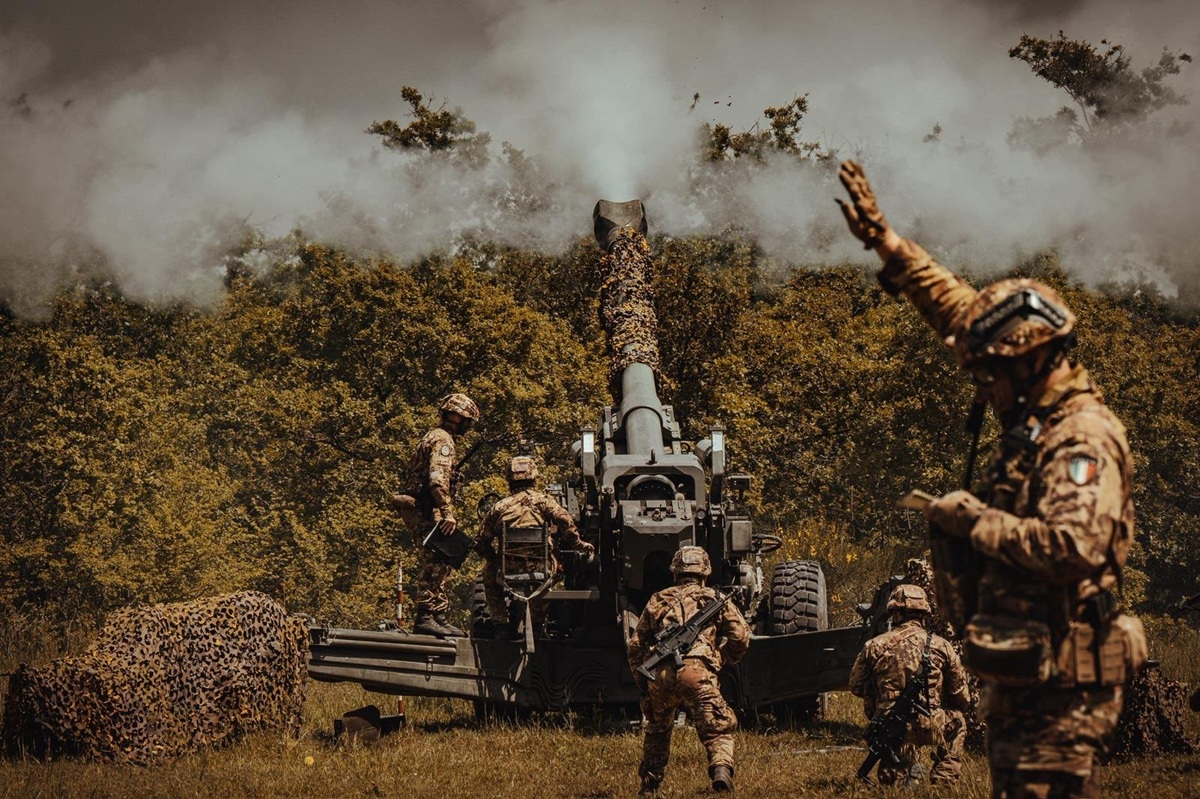
185th Paratroopers Artillery Regiment "Folgore" FH70 howitzers during an exercise at Monte Romano

As of 2026 the 185th Paratroopers Artillery Regiment "Folgore" is organized as follows:

- 185th Paratroopers Artillery Regiment "Folgore", in Bracciano
  - Command and Logistic Support Battery
  - 1st Group "Viterbo"
    - 1st Heavy Mortar Battery
    - 2nd Heavy Mortar Battery
    - 3rd Howitzer Battery
    - Surveillance and Technical Support Battery

The heavy mortar batteries are equipped with MO-120 RT 120mm mortars, while the howitzer battery is equipped with FH-70 towed howitzers.

== See also ==
- Paratroopers Brigade "Folgore"
