= Battle of Alam el Halfa order of battle =

Order of battle in 1942 WWII battle

This is the order of battle for the Battle of Alam el Halfa, a World War II battle between the British Commonwealth and the Axis powers of Germany and Italy in North Africa between 30 August and 5 September 1942. The forces were the Eighth Army (British and New Zealand units) and the Panzer Armee Afrika (German and Italian units)

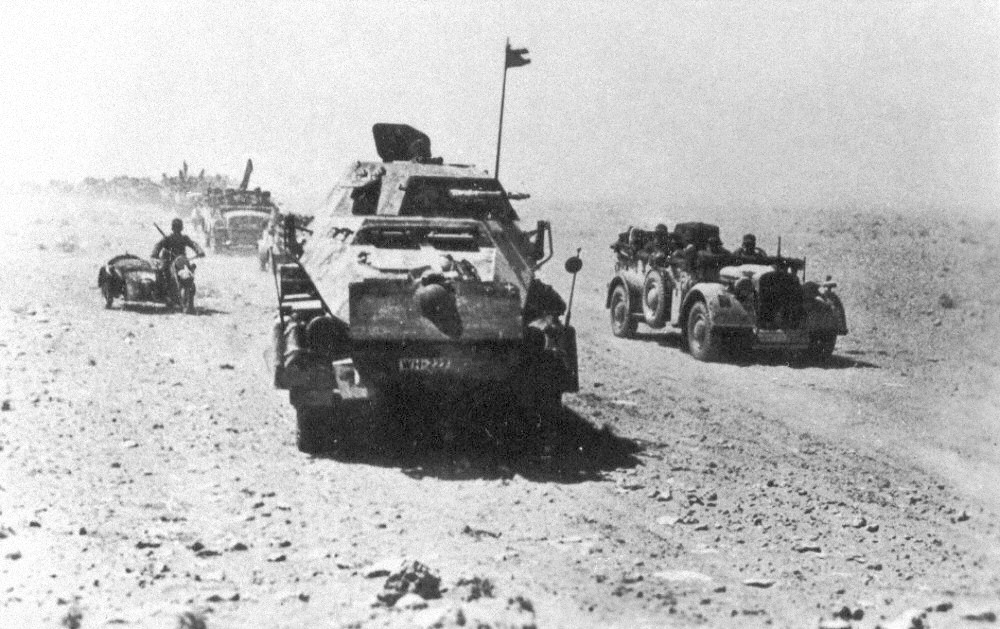
Panzerjäger-Abteilung 39 (an anti-tank unit) part of "Kampfgruppe Gräf", formed within the 21st Panzer Division, on the move, 1942

== Allied forces ==
=== Eighth Army ===
Lieutenant-general Bernard Montgomery

XIII Corps

Lieutenant-general Brian Horrocks

- 2nd New Zealand Division – Lieutenant-General Bernard Freyberg
  - 4th New Zealand Infantry Brigade – Brigadier Lindsay Inglis
    - 18th New Zealand Infantry Battalion
    - 19th New Zealand Infantry Battalion
    - 20th New Zealand Infantry Battalion
    - No.4 Anti-Tank Battery, 7th Anti-Tank Regiment, New Zealand Artillery
  - 5th New Zealand Infantry Brigade – Brigadier Howard Kippenberger
    - 21st New Zealand Infantry Battalion
    - 22nd New Zealand Infantry Battalion
    - 23rd New Zealand Infantry Battalion
    - No.5 Anti-Tank Battery, 7th Anti-Tank Regiment, New Zealand Artillery
  - 6th New Zealand Infantry Brigade – Brigadier George Clifton (captured 4 September)
    - 24th New Zealand Infantry Battalion
    - 25th New Zealand Infantry Battalion
    - 26th New Zealand Infantry Battalion
    - No.6 Anti-Tank Battery, 7th Anti-Tank Regiment, New Zealand Artillery
  - British 132nd Infantry Brigade (detached from 44th Division) – Brigadier C.B. Robertson (wounded)
    - 2nd Battalion, The Buffs Royal East Kent Regiment
    - 4th Battalion, The Queen's Own Royal West Kent Regiment
    - 5th Battalion, The Queen's Own Royal West Kent Regiment
- 44th (Home Counties) Division – Major-general Ivor Hughes
  - British 131st Infantry Brigade – Brigadier E.H.C. Frith
    - 1/5th Battalion, The Queen's Royal Regiment
    - 1/6th Battalion, The Queen's Royal Regiment
    - 1/7th Battalion, The Queen's Royal Regiment
  - British 133rd Infantry Brigade – Brigadier Lashmer Whistler
    - 2nd Battalion, Royal Sussex Regiment
    - 4th Battalion, Royal Sussex Regiment
    - 5th Battalion, Royal Sussex Regiment
- 7th Armoured Division – Major-General James Renton
  - 4th Light Armoured Brigade – Brigadier Carr
    - 4th/8th Hussars
    - 11th Hussars
    - 12th Lancers
    - 1st Battalion, King's Royal Rifle Corps
    - 3rd Anti-Tank Regiment, Royal Horse Artillery
  - 7th Motor Brigade – Brigadier Bosville
    - 2nd Battalion, King's Royal Rifle Corps
    - 2nd Battalion, The Rifle Brigade
    - 7th Battalion, The Rifle Brigade
- 10th Armoured Division – Major-General Alexander Gatehouse
  - 22nd Armoured Brigade – Brigadier George Roberts
    - 2nd Royal Gloucestershire Hussars
    - 5th Royal Inniskilling Dragoon Guards
    - 3rd County of London Yeomanry (Sharpshooters)
    - 4th County of London Yeomanry
    - 1st Battalion, The Rifle Brigade
  - 8th Armoured Brigade – Brigadier Edward Custance
    - 3rd Royal Tank Regiment
    - Nottinghamshire Yeomanry (Sherwood Rangers)
    - The Staffordshire Yeomanry
    - 1st Battalion, The Buffs, Royal East Kent Regiment
  - 23rd Armoured Brigade – Brigadier George Richards
    - 40th (The King's) Royal Tank Regiment
    - 46th (The Liverpool Welsh) Royal Tank Regiment
    - 50th Royal Tank Regiment
    - 5th Regiment, Royal Horse Artillery

== Axis forces ==
=== Panzerarmee Afrika ===
Generalfeldmarschall Erwin Rommel

Deutsches Afrika Korps

Generalleutnant Walther Nehring (wounded in an air attack on 31 August and replaced by Rommel's chief-of-staff oberst Fritz Bayerlein)

- 15th Panzer Division – Generalmajor Gustav von Vaerst
- 21st Panzer Division – Generalmajor Georg von Bismarck
- 90th Light Division – Generalmajor Ulrich Kleemann

Italian XX Motorised Corps

Major general Giuseppe De Stefanis

- 101st Motorised Division "Trieste" – Major general Francesco La Ferla
- 132nd Armoured Division "Ariete" – Major general Adolfo Infante
- 133rd Armoured Division "Littorio" – Major general Gervasio Bitossi

Italian X Corps

Lieutenant general Federico Ferrari Orsi

- 17th Infantry Division "Pavia" – Major general Nazzareno Scattaglia
- 27th Infantry Division "Brescia" – Major general Brunetto Brunetti
- 185th Infantry Division "Folgore" – Major general Enrico Frattini

== Tanks in use by both sides ==
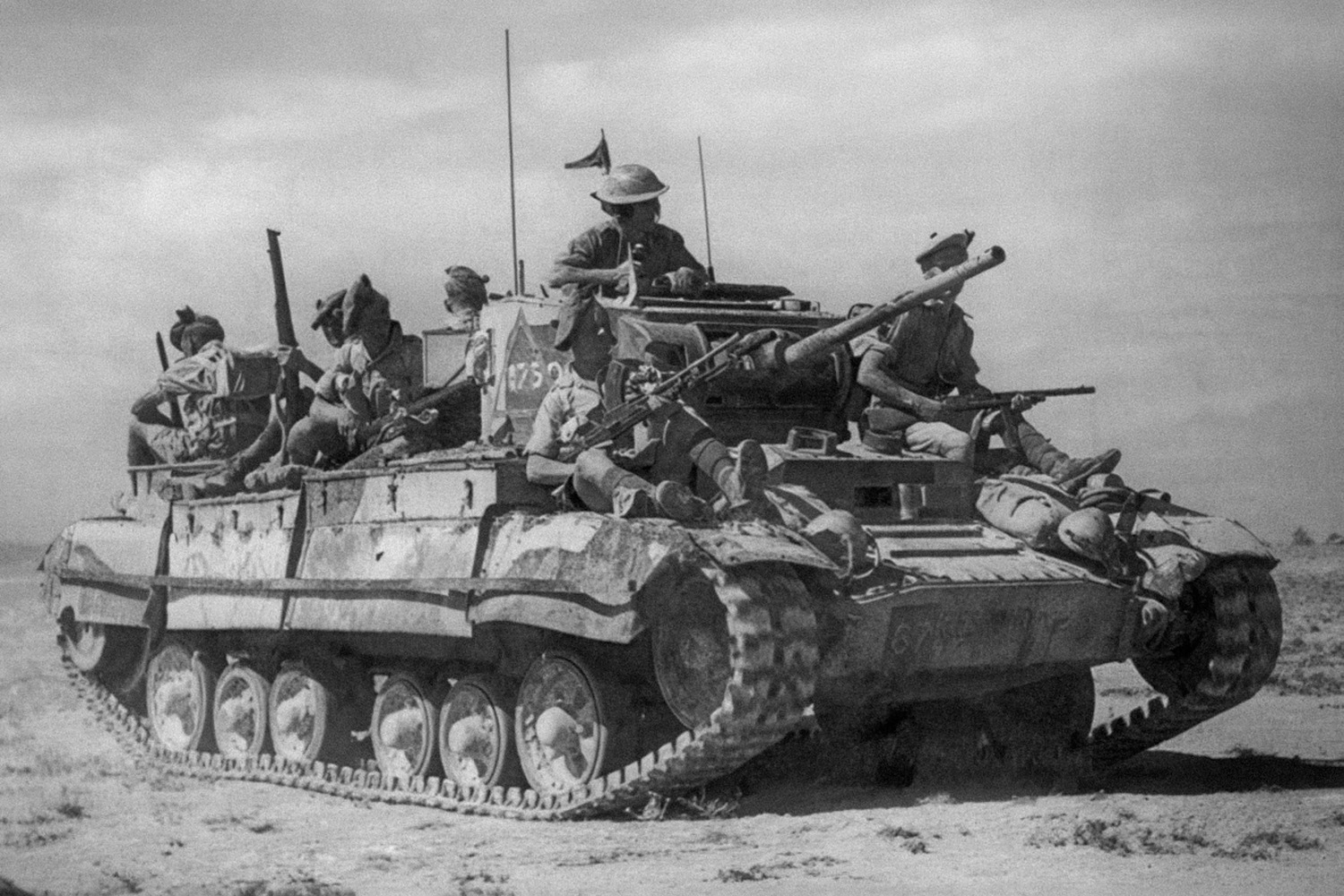
A British Valentine tank carrying Scottish soldiers in North Africa

The Deutsches Africa Korps had 229 German and 243 Italian tanks The Germans had 27 of the Panzer IV variant with the long-barreled gun 75mm gun. This longer barrelled gun gave the Mark IV superior range than the Allied tanks. A total of 472.

The Allies had 500 tanks that would see action during this battle. 170 of these were M3 Grant medium tanks, the best tank the Allies had access to at this time. The remaining tanks were made up of M3 Stuart light tanks, Crusader Mk II cruiser tanks and Valentine infantry tanks. A total of 500.
