= Enrico Frattini =

Italian general during WWII

- Born: 31 May 1891; Naples, Kingdom of Italy
- Died: 11 February 1980 (aged 88); Rome, Italy
- Military career
- Allegiance: Kingdom of Italy; Italy
- Branch: Royal Italian Army; Italian Army
- Service years: 1912–1954
- Rank: Lieutenant General
- Commands: 73rd Engineer Battalion; 10th Sapper Battalion; 10th Engineer Regiment; 3rd Engineer Training Regiment; 185th Infantry Division "Folgore"; X Corps; Territorial Military Command of Genoa; Territorial Military Command of Rome; Allied Land Forces Southern Europe
- Conflicts: World War I; First Battle of Monte Grappa; World War II; Battle of Alam Halfa; Operation Braganza; Second battle of El Alamein
- Awards: War Cross of Military Valor; Order of Merit of the Italian Republic

Enrico Frattini (Naples, 31 May 1891 – Rome, 11 February 1980) was an Italian general during World War II, most notable for commanding the 185th Infantry Division "Folgore" during the second battle of El Alamein, and the second commander of Allied Land Forces Southern Europe in the 1950s.

== Biography ==
=== Early career and World War I ===
Frattini began his military career in 1912, as an officer of the Engineer Corps of the Royal Italian Army. In 1913 he was sent to Libya, with the 5th Engineer Regiment; after promotion to captain in 1915 he remained in Tripolitania. He participated in the First World War on the Italian front and in late 1917, temporarily in command of the 73rd Engineer Battalion, he organized the defense on the Piave river between Nervesa and Palazzon. In 1918 he was in command of the 10th Sapper Battalion, with which he organized several defensive lines. During the war he was awarded the War Cross for Military Valor.

From 1919 to 1921 he attended the Oriental Institute of Naples. In 1925 he was assigned to the Turin Military Division, where he remained for two years. After promotion to lieutenant colonel in 1926, in 1929 he became military attaché in Tokyo and from 1932 he was also accredited to the Chinese Legation. Promoted to colonel in 1933, in 1935 he took command of the 10th Engineer Regiment and then of the 3rd Engineer Training Regiment. In 1938 he became brigadier general and commander of the Engineers of the Third Army Corps of Milan.

=== World War II ===
In 1940 Frattini was transferred to the Ministry of War and in 1941 he became section chief at the Army General Staff, where he worked to set up a paratroop unit. The General Staff did not believe in airborne troops and had often hindered their preparation and morale, considering them "politicized and unreliable", resulting in there being no general willing to command the newly formed paratrooper division, named 185th Infantry Division "Folgore". Therefore, General Frattini, despite belonging to the Engineering Corps and serving as adjutant to General Mario Roatta, Deputy Chief of Staff, volunteered as commander of the new division. In the summer of 1942 he was thus given command of "Folgore" and sent to North Africa, where his troops were deployed near El Alamein. Following the death of General Federico Ferrari Orsi, commander of the X Corps of which "Folgore" was part, in early October 1942, Frattini was also given command of the X Corps.

During the second battle of El Alamein, the "Folgore" Division distinguished itself, repelling attacks by the 7th Armored Division, 44th Infantry Division and 50th Infantry Division between 23 and 27 October 1942. Having defended its positions at the southern end of the front, on 3 November the division was ordered to retreat westwards following the British breakthrough on the northern part of the front. Lacking vehicles, the men were forced to retreat on foot; after two days of march in the desert, at 14:35 on 6 November, the remnants of "Folgore" were caught up by the 44th British Infantry Division and surrendered after destroying their weapons. The rest of the X Corps was destroyed during the retreat across the desert and Frattini was captured along with his staff. General Ivor Hughes, commander of the 44th Infantry Division, met Frattini and congratulated him on the behavior of his men. For its conduct during the battle of El Alamein the regiments of the "Folgore" Division were awarded the Gold Medal of Military Valor.

Frattini remained a prisoner of war of the British until 1944, when he was repatriated following the Armistice of Cassibile and Italy's new status as co-belligerent with the Allies.

== Postwar ==
In 1945 Frattini was appointed Territorial Military Commander of Genoa and in 1947 of Rome. From 1946 to 1947 he was also Inspector of the Engineers Corps of the Italian Army at the Ministry of Defense in Rome. In 1948 he was promoted to lieutenant general, in 1950 he served at the Defense Staff and in 1952 he became commander of NATO Allied Land Forces Southern Europe. After leaving the Army in 1954, from 1956 General Frattini became president of the National Paratroopers Association of Italy.
