= 185th Paratroopers Reconnaissance Target Acquisition Regiment "Folgore" =

Active Italian Army special forces unit

- 185° Reggimento Paracadutisti Ricognizione Acquisizione Obiettivi "Folgore"
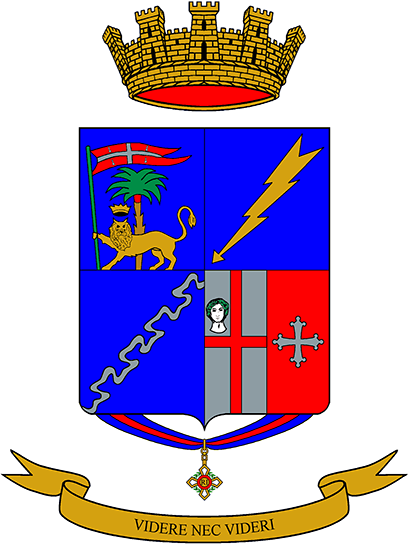
- Regimental coat of arms
- Active: 1 April 1941 — 9 Jan. 1944; 1 Jan. 1963 — 30 June 1998; 21 June 2013 — today
- Country: Italy
- Branch: Italian Army
- Part of: Army Special Forces Command
- Garrison/HQ: Livorno
- Motto(s): "Videre nec videri"
- Anniversaries: 20 April 1945 - Operation Herring
- Decorations: 1x Military Order of Italy

Insignia
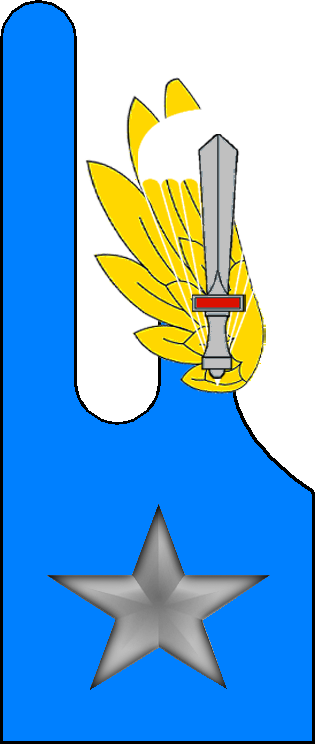
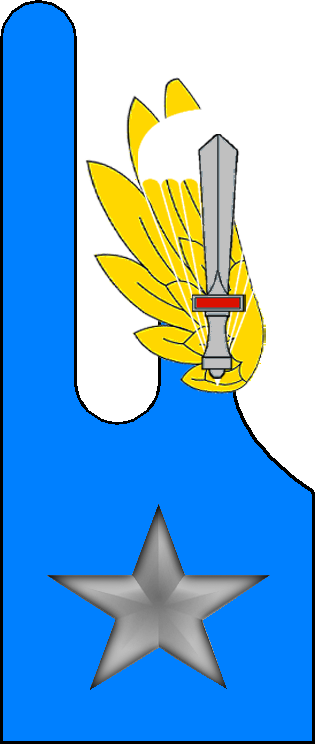
- Regimental gorget patches

The 185th Paratroopers Reconnaissance Target Acquisition Regiment "Folgore" (Italian: 185° Reggimento Paracadutisti Ricognizione Acquisizione Obiettivi "Folgore", abbreviated as: 185° RAO) is an Italian Army special forces unit. The regiment is part of the Italian Army's infantry arm's Paracadutisti speciality and assigned to the Army Special Forces Command. The regiment was formed in 1941 as 1st Paratroopers Regiment and assigned, in September 1941, to the Paratroopers Division. The division was intended to parachute onto Malta during the planned invasion of Malta. In July 1942, the invasion of Malta was postponed indefinitely and the Paratroopers Division was ordered to deploy to North Africa as reinforcement for the German-Italian Panzer Army Africa. Consequently, the division, which would operate as an infantry formation in North Africa, was renamed on 27 July 1942 185th Infantry Division "Folgore". On the same day, the 1st Paratroopers Regiment was renamed 185th Infantry Regiment "Folgore". When the division moved to North Africa the regiment remained in Italy and in September 1942, the regiment left the division. On 1 November 1942, the regiment joined the 184th Infantry Division "Nembo" and was renamed 185th Infantry Regiment "Nembo". In May 1943, the 184th Infantry Division "Nembo" was ordered to deploy to the island Sardinia and once again the regiment did not accompany the division, but was instead sent to Apulia and then to Sicily.

In July 1943, the regiment fought against the Allied invasion of Sicily. After the announcement of the Armistice of Cassibile on 8 September 1943 the regiment split, with the III Paratroopers Battalion joining the German side and the XI Paratroopers Battalion and 9th Company of the III Paratroopers Battalion joining the allied side. In January 1944, the regiment was disbanded and its personnel used to form to the CLXXXV Paratroopers Battalion "Nembo", while the 9th Company, which had operated as an autonomous unit on the allied side since September 1943, was renamed 1st Reconnaissance Squadron "Folgore". Both units fought on the allied side in the Italian campaign. In September 1944, the CLXXXV Paratroopers Battalion "Nembo" was disbanded and its personnel assigned to the Paratroopers Regiment "Nembo" of the Combat Group "Folgore". In July 1945, the 1st Reconnaissance Squadron "Folgore" was disbanded.

In 1963, regiment was reformed as 1st Paratroopers Regiment and consisted of two battalions. In 1975, the regiment was disbanded and its two battalions became autonomous units. As part of the same reform the Paratroopers Recruits Training Battalion was renamed 3rd Paratroopers Battalion "Poggio Rusco" and assigned the flag and traditions of the 185th Infantry Regiment "Folgore". In 1998, the battalion was disbanded and the flag of the 185th Infantry Regiment "Folgore" transferred to the Shrine of the Flags in the Vittoriano in Rome for safekeeping. In 2013, the regiment's flag and traditions were assigned to the 185th Paratroopers Reconnaissance Target Acquisition Regiment "Folgore", which until then had been assigned the flag and traditions of the 185th Artillery Regiment "Folgore". The regiment's anniversary falls on 20 April 1945, the day the paratroopers of the 1st Reconnaissance Squadron "Folgore", departed the United States Army Air Forces airfield at Rosignano for Operation Herring.

== History ==
=== Formation ===
On 1 July 1940, the Royal Italian Air Force's Paratroopers School in Tarquinia formed the I Paratroopers Battalion for the Royal Italian Army. In the following days, the Paratroopers School formed the II Paratroopers Battalion, and then the III Paratroopers Battalion, which consisted of personnel drawn from the Carabinieri troops. After their formation the three battalions began with their parachute training. On 15 July 1940, the I Paratroopers Battalion ceded its number for reason of precedence to the III Paratroopers Battalion, which on the same day was redesignated I Carabinieri Paratroopers Battalion. On the same day the I Paratroopers Battalion was renumbered as II Paratroopers Battalion, while the II Paratroopers Battalion was renumbered as III Paratroopers Battalion.

On 1 April 1941, the Royal Italian Army formed the 1st Paratroopers Regiment in Viterbo. The new regiment consisted of a command, the I Carabinieri Paratroopers Battalion, the II Paratroopers Battalion, the III Paratroopers Battalion, a support weapons company, and a depot. In June 1941, the I Carabinieri Paratroopers Battalion left the regiment and moved to Libya. As a replacement, the regiment received the newly formed IV Paratroopers Battalion. On 1 July 1941, the regiment replaced the Support Weapons Company with the 1st Cannons Company, which was equipped with 47/32 mod. 35 anti-tank guns.

=== World War II ===
==== Battle of Greece ====
On 30 April 1941, the last day of the Battle of Greece, three Savoia-Marchetti SM.82 transport planes left Galatina Air Base with 75 paratroopers of the II Paratroopers Battalion. In the early hours of the afternoon, the paratroopers conducted the first Italian airborne assault near Argostoli on the Greek island of Cephalonia. The Greek troops on the island surrendered without bloodshed on the same day. The next day the paratroopers commandeered some boats and proceeded to occupy the islands of Zakynthos and Ithaca.

On 1 September 1941, the 2nd Paratroopers Regiment was formed in Viterbo with the V, VI, and VII paratroopers battalions. On the same day, the new regiment joined, together with the 1st Paratroopers Regiment, the newly formed Paratroopers Division in Tarquinia. The division was one of the Royal Italian Army units assigned to the planned invasion of Malta and after its formation the division began with the training for the invasion. At the time the 1st Paratroopers regiment consisted of the following units:

- 1st Paratroopers Regiment
  - Command Company
  - II Paratroopers Battalion
    - 4th, 5th, and 6th Company
  - III Paratroopers Battalion
    - 7th, 8th, and 9th Company
  - IV Paratroopers Battalion
    - 10th, 11th, and 12th Company
  - 1st Cannons Company (47/32 mod. 35 anti-tank guns)

On 10 March 1942, the Artillery Regiment for Paratroopers Division was formed and assigned to the Paratroopers Division, and five days later, on 15 March 1942, the 3rd Paratroopers Regiment was formed and assigned to the division. In July 1942, after the First Battle of El Alamein, the invasion of Malta was postponed indefinitely and the Royal Italian Army's General Staff decided to send the Paratroopers Division to North Africa to reinforce the depleted German-Italian Panzer Army Africa at El Alamein in Egypt. As the Paratroopers Division would operate in North Africa as an infantry formation, the division was renamed on 27 July 1942 185th Infantry Division "Folgore". On the same day, the 1st Paratroopers Regiment was renamed 185th Infantry Regiment "Folgore", while the 2nd Paratroopers Regiment was renamed 186th Infantry Regiment "Folgore", the 3rd Paratroopers Regiment 187th Infantry Regiment "Folgore", and the Artillery Regiment for Paratroopers Division 185th Artillery Regiment "Folgore". However, when the division deployed to North Africa, the 185th Infantry Regiment "Folgore" remained in Italy. On 15 September 1942, the 185th Infantry Regiment "Folgore" left the "Folgore" division and, on the same day, ceded its II and IV paratroopers battalions to the 187th Infantry Regiment "Folgore". As replacement the regiment received the XI Paratroopers Battalion, which was still in the process of being formed.

On 1 November 1942, the regiment was renamed 185th Infantry Regiment "Nembo" and assigned, together with the 184th Infantry Regiment "Nembo", to the newly formed 184th Infantry Division "Nembo". At this time the regiment also included the X/bis Paratroopers Battalion, which had been formed after the X Paratroopers Battalion had to be disbanded due to the losses the battalion had suffered in Operation Braganza at El Alamein. After joining the "Nembo" division the 185th Infantry Regiment "Nembo" consisted of the following units:

- 185th Infantry Regiment "Nembo"
  - Command Company
  - III Paratroopers Battalion
    - 7th, 8th, and 9th Company
  - X/bis Paratroopers Battalion
    - 28th, 29th, and 30th Company
  - XI Paratroopers Battalion
    - 31st, 32nd, and 33rd Company
  - 185th Cannons Company (47/32 mod. 35 anti-tank guns)

On 1 February 1943, the 183rd Infantry Regiment "Nembo" was formed. The new regiment consisted of the VIII/bis, XV, and XVI paratroopers battalions. The VIII/bis Paratroopers Battalion had been formed as a replacement for the VIII Paratroopers Battalion, which, in May 1942, had been redesignated as VIII Paratroopers Sappers Battalion and, in November 1942, been destroyed in the Second Battle of El Alamein. In March 1943, the regiment's III Paratroopers Battalion was deployed to the Julian March to fight Yugoslav partisan formations. In April 1943, the III Paratroopers Battalion was joined by the XI Paratroopers Battalion and the two battalions formed a Grouping under the command of the regiment's deputy commander. The grouping operated in the area of Črni Vrh, Vipava, Zadlog, Postojna and Ajdovščina until June 1943. In May 1943, the 184th Infantry Division "Nembo" was ordered to deploy to Sardinia and the 183rd Infantry Regiment "Nembo" exchanged its not yet fully trained VIII/bis Paratroopers Battalion with the X/bis Paratroopers Battalion of the 185th Infantry Regiment "Nembo".

==== Invasion of Sicily ====
In July, the 185th Infantry Regiment "Nembo", which at the time consisted of the III, VIII/bis, and XI paratroopers battalions, and III Paratroopers Artillery Group of the 184th Artillery Regiment "Nembo" were sent to Apulia in southern Italy to guard Royal Italian Air Force airfields on the Salento peninsula. On 10 July 1943, Allied forces landed in Sicily and the regiment and artillery group were shipped to Sicily to reinforce the Axis's line of defence in the island's northeastern corner. On 3 August 1943, the regiment took up its positions on the northern slopes of the Peloritani mountains between Barcellona Pozzo di Gotto and Castroreale. However, the American Seventh Army's advance was unstoppable and the regiment was forced to fall back to Messina. Allied airpower forced the regiment to abandon all its vehicles and materiel and retreat by foot over the mountains. After reaching Messian the regiment was evacuated on 16 August 1943 to Reggio Calabria.

==== Invasion of Italy ====
In Calabria the 185th Infantry Regiment was assigned to the 211th Coastal Division, which was tasked with the coastal defense of the southernmost tip of Calabria. The regiment, which formed the division's reserve, had its headquarters and the III Paratroopers Artillery Group in Cittanova, while the XI Paratroopers Battalion was at Santa Cristina d'Aspromonte, the III Paratroopers Battalion at Melia, and VIII/bis Paratroopers Battalion at Melito di Porto Salvo.

On 3 September 1943, British and Canadian forces landed on the Calabrian coast: the 5th British Infantry Division between Bagnara Calabra and Villa San Giovanni, and the 1st Canadian Infantry Division between Reggio Calabria and Melito di Porto Salvo. While the coastal units of the 211th Coastal Division quickly surrendered, the 185th Infantry Regiment "Nembo" and German units moved into the mountainous interior of Calabria. On 4 September, the XI Paratroopers Battalion clashed with British forces in Gambarie, while patrols of the VIII/bis Paratroopers Battalion fought Canadian forces between Bagaladi and San Lorenzo, after which the battalion retreated over the Aspromonte mountains towards Platì. On 7 September, the VIII/bis Paratroopers Battalion reached the road passing from Platì to Santa Cristina d'Aspromonte and found it occupied by Canadian forces moving towards Delianuova. Unaware of the presence of the Italian paratroopers the Canadian 1st Battalion, The Loyal Edmonton Regiment and 1st Battalion, The West Nova Scotia Regiment bivouacked on the road and thus blocked the paratroopers' route of escape. Early in the morning of 8 September the remaining 400 Italian paratroopers attacked and tried to break through the Canadian lines, however, the Canadians prevailed and the VIII/bis Paratroopers Battalion was annihilated.

==== Armistice of Cassibile ====
In the evening of 8 September 1943, the same day the VIII/bis Paratroopers Battalion was annihilated, the Armistice of Cassibile, which ended hostilities between the Kingdom of Italy and the Anglo-American Allies, was announced by General Dwight D. Eisenhower on Radio Algiers and by Marshal Pietro Badoglio on Italian radio. The news of the armistice reached the remnants of the 185th Infantry Regiment "Nembo" during the evening of 8 September 1943. At the time the regimental command and XI Paratroopers Battalion were in Cardinale, while the III Paratroopers Battalion was further East in Soveria Mannelli. Without clear orders or news from Rome, the regiment split: the units in Cardinale decided to remain there and wait for the arrival of allied forces, while the III Paratroopers Battalion decided to continue retreating with the German 29th Panzergrenadier Division. On 10 September 1943, the news that King Victor Emmanuel III, the royal family, and the Badoglio government had fled Rome and taken refuge with British forces in Brindisi reached III Paratroopers Battalion. Once the news spread among the battalion's troops the 9th Company and some personnel of the 7th Company decided to join the allied side and abandoned the retreating German column.

==== Italian Co-belligerent Army ====
===== CLXXXV Paratroopers Battalion "Nembo" =====
The 185th Infantry Regiment "Nembo", which consisted of the XI Paratroopers Battalion, joined the Italian Co-belligerent Army, which was formed in southern Italy with the forces that had remained loyal to King Victor Emmanuel III. The 185th Infantry Regiment "Nembo" moved from Calabria to Apulia, where, on 9 January 1944, the regiment and XI Paratroopers Battalion were disbanded and their personnel used to form the CLXXXV Paratroopers Battalion "Nembo". The battalion was equipped with Italian materiel and consisted of a command, a command platoon, the 31st, 32nd, and 33rd paratroopers companies, the 34th Mortar Company, which was equipped with 81mm Mod. 35 mortars, and the 35th Cannons Company, which was equipped with 47/32 mod. 35 anti-tank guns. The battalion was assigned to the brigade-sized I Motorized Grouping, which was attached to the American Fifth Army and fought in the Battle of Monte Cassino. By March 1944, the I Motorized Grouping had grown to a division-sized unit and was therefore split on 22 March 1944 in two brigades and renamed Italian Liberation Corps. The CLXXXV Paratroopers Battalion "Nembo" was assigned to the corps' I Brigade.

In May 1944, the 184th Infantry Division "Nembo" was transferred from Sardinia to mainland Italy, where the division joined the Italian Liberation Corps. In June 1944, the CLXXXV Paratroopers Battalion "Nembo" was sent to Brindisi to train for an air assault near Florence. However the air assault was cancelled and, in September 1944, when the Italian Liberation Corps was disbanded and its personnel used to create two division-sized combat groups, the CLXXXV Paratroopers Battalion "Nembo" was disbanded and its personnel assigned to the Paratroopers Regiment "Nembo" of the Combat Group "Folgore". The Combat Group "Folgore", whose personnel had been drawn from the disbanded 184th Infantry Division "Nembo", was dressed in British uniforms and equipped with British materiel. The combat group was assigned to the British XIII Corps, with which it fought it in the Italian Campaign.

===== 1st Reconnaissance Squadron "Folgore" =====
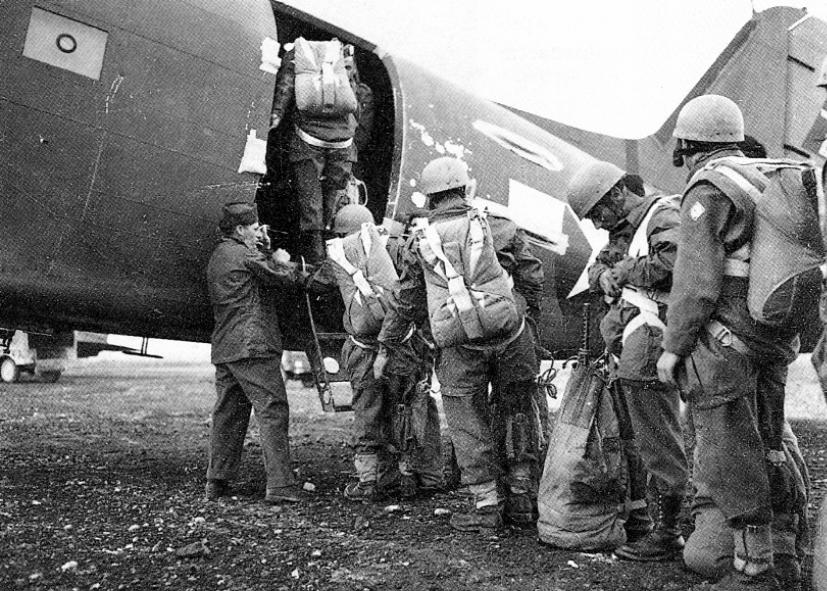
1st Reconnaissance Squadron "Folgore" troops entering a USAAF Douglas C-47 for Operation Herring

The 9th Company of the regiment's III Paratroopers Battalion was the first Italian unit to directly support Allied forces in the war against German forces. Already in September 1943, the company's officers met with officers of the 1st Canadian Infantry Division and offered to carry out reconnaissance and sabotage missions behind German lines. The company won the Allies' trust by undertaking patrols beyond the Biferno river, towards Agnone and Isernia, behind the German Volturno Line, followed later by patrols in the upper Sangro valley behind the German's Barbara Line. The company was then transferred to the British XIII Corps Corps and received about a hundred reinforcements from the CLXXXV Paratroopers Battalion "Nembo". On 15 January 1944, the company assumed the name of 1st Reconnaissance Squadron "Folgore" (Squadron "F") and continued to operate behind German lines until the middle of March 1944, when it was transferred to Sesto Campano in Apulia for a training cycle with the British Special Air Service that ended in early May.

Afterwards, the squadron conducted reconnaissance missions, patrols, infiltration and sabotage actions behind the German lines. In October 1944, the squadron received additional reinforcements from the disbanded CLXXXV Paratroopers Battalion "Nembo". At the end of March 1945, the squadron came under the direct command of the allied 15th Army Group and around a hundred of its paratroopers began to train for an airborne operation behind German lines. On 20 April 1945, the paratroopers of the Squadron "F" jumped in Operation Herring, the war's final airborne combat drop, into the area of Poggio Rusco. After the war the 1st Reconnaissance Squadron "Folgore" was disbanded on 15 July 1945 in Fiesole.

=== Cold War ===
In 1952, the Italian Army's Military Parachuting Center in Pisa formed a paratroopers battalion, which in 1957 was reorganized as 1st Paratroopers Tactical Group. The group, which was based in Livorno, consisted of the II Paratroopers Battalion and V Paratroopers Battalion. On 1 January 1963, the Military Parachuting Center was reorganized as Paratroopers Brigade. On the same day, the 1st Paratroopers Tactical Group was renamed 1st Paratroopers Regiment and assigned to the brigade. The reformed regiment consisted of a command, a command company, the II Paratroopers Battalion, the V Paratroopers Battalion, and a mortar company. During the Western Desert campaign the II Paratroopers Battalion and V Paratroopers Battalion had been assigned to the 187th Infantry Regiment "Folgore" respectively the 186th Infantry Regiment "Folgore". Both battalions were destroyed during the Second Battle of El Alamein and declared lost due to wartime events on 25 November 1942. On 10 June 1967, the Paratroopers Brigade was renamed Paratroopers Brigade "Folgore".

During the 1975 army reform the Italian Army disbanded the regimental level and newly independent battalions were granted for the first time their own flags. On 30 September 1975, the 1st Paratroopers Regiment and the regiment's command company were disbanded. The next day, on 1 October 1975, the regiment's two battalions became autonomous units and were renamed 2nd Paratroopers Battalion "Tarquinia" and 5th Paratroopers Battalion "El Alamein", while the regiment's mortar company was split to form two new mortar companies, which were assigned to the two paratroopers battalions. On the same day, the Paratroopers Recruits Training Battalion of the Parachuting Military School in Pisa was renamed 3rd Paratroopers Battalion "Poggio Rusco". On 12 November 1976, the President of the Italian Republic Giovanni Leone assigned with decree 846 the flag and traditions of the 185th Infantry Regiment "Folgore" to the 3rd Paratroopers Battalion "Poggio Rusco". The battalion was assigned to the Paratroopers Brigade "Folgore" as the brigade's recruits training battalion and consisted of a command, a command and services platoon, and the 7th, 8th, 9th, and 10th paratroopers recruit companies.

In 1981, the battalion's 10th Paratroopers Recruits Company was renamed 16th Paratroopers Recruits Company, as the 2nd Paratroopers Battalion "Tarquinia" formed a fourth paratroopers company, which was designated 10th Paratroopers Company. In 1986, the 3rd Paratroopers Battalion "Poggio Rusco" was renamed 3rd Airdrop Training Battalion "Poggio Rusco".

=== Recent times ===
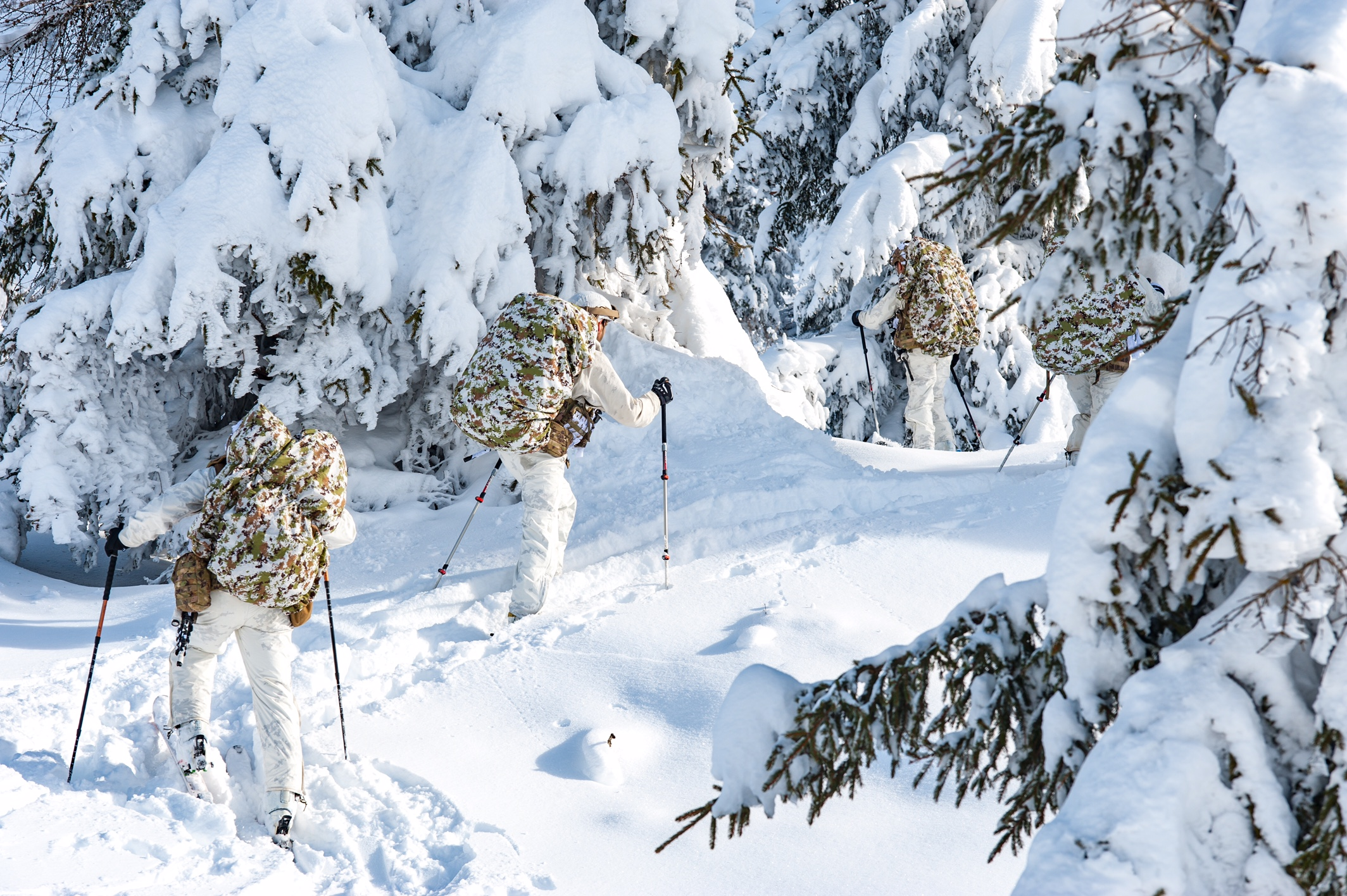
185th Paratroopers Reconnaissance Target Acquisition Regiment "Folgore" operators during the Blizzard I exercise 2018

In 1996, the battalion moved from Pisa to Scandicci. On 30 June 1998, the 3rd Airdrop Training Battalion "Poggio Rusco" was disbanded and the flag of the 185th Infantry Regiment "Folgore" was transferred to the Shrine of the Flags in the Vittoriano in Rome for safekeeping.

On 3 April 2000, the 185th Artillery Regiment "Folgore" was reorganized as target acquisition unit and renamed 185th Field Artillery Regiment (Target Acquisition Paratroopers) "Folgore". In 2002, the regiment became a special operations forces unit and in 2004 it was renamed 185th Paratroopers Reconnaissance Target Acquisition Regiment "Folgore".

In 2013, the Italian Army decided to reform an artillery regiment for the Paratroopers Brigade "Folgore", which had been without an artillery unit since the 185th Artillery Regiment "Folgore" had become a target acquisition unit in 2000. On 21 June 2013, the 185th Artillery Regiment "Folgore" was reformed in Bracciano. On the same day, the reformed regiment received its flag from the 185th Paratroopers Reconnaissance Target Acquisition Regiment "Folgore", which in turn was assigned on the same day the flag and traditions of the 185th Infantry Regiment "Folgore".

On 19 September 2014, the Italian Army's Army Special Forces Command was formed in Pisa and the 185th Paratroopers Reconnaissance Target Acquisition Regiment "Folgore" was transferred from the Paratroopers Brigade "Folgore" to the newly formed command. On 15 June 2015, the regiment exchanged the paratroopers' beret flash with the beret flash of the 1st Reconnaissance Squadron "Folgore" (Squadron "F"). In 2017, the regiment became a special forces unit. On 3 November 2018, the regiment was awarded a Military Order of Italy for its conduct and service during international missions. The order was affixed to the regiment's flag on 4 May 2019, the 158th anniversary of the Italian Army's founding, and added to the regiment's coat of arms.

== Organization ==
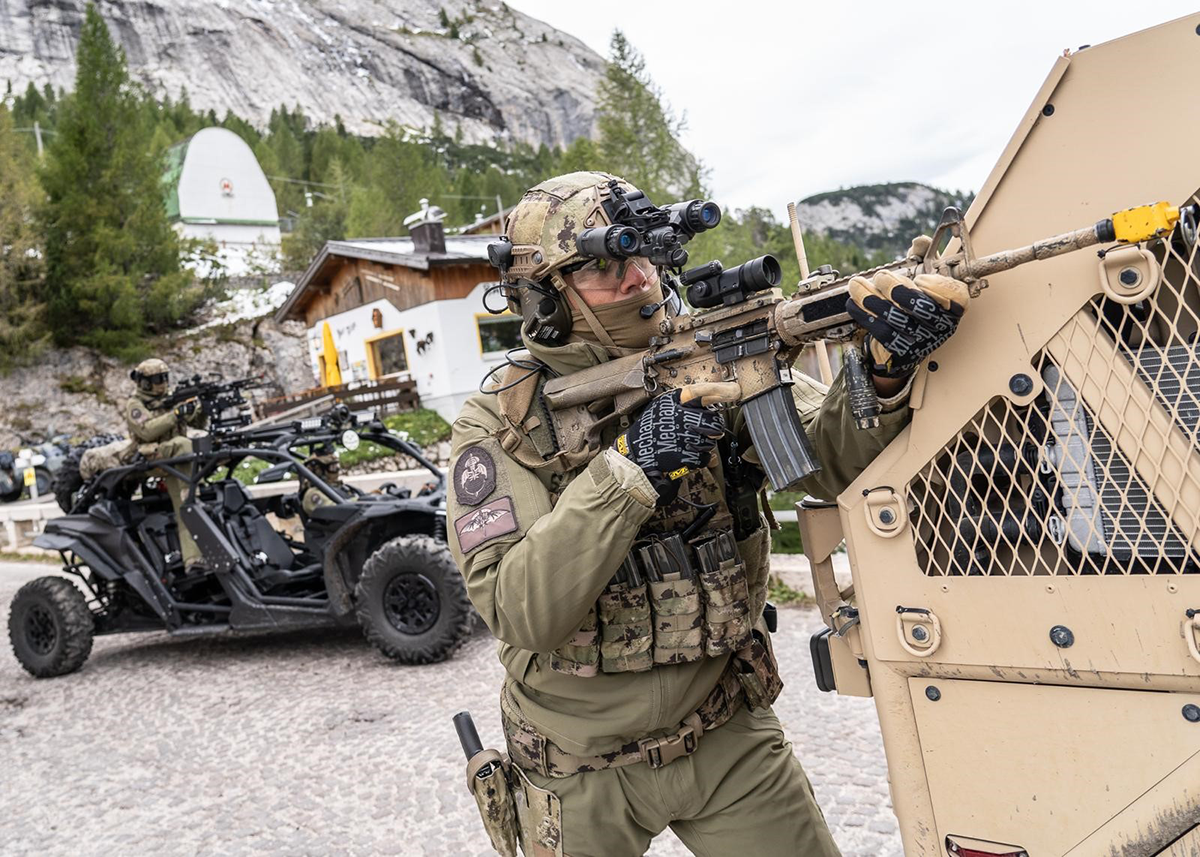
185th Paratroopers Reconnaissance Target Acquisition Regiment "Folgore" operators during the Stella Alpina exercise 2024

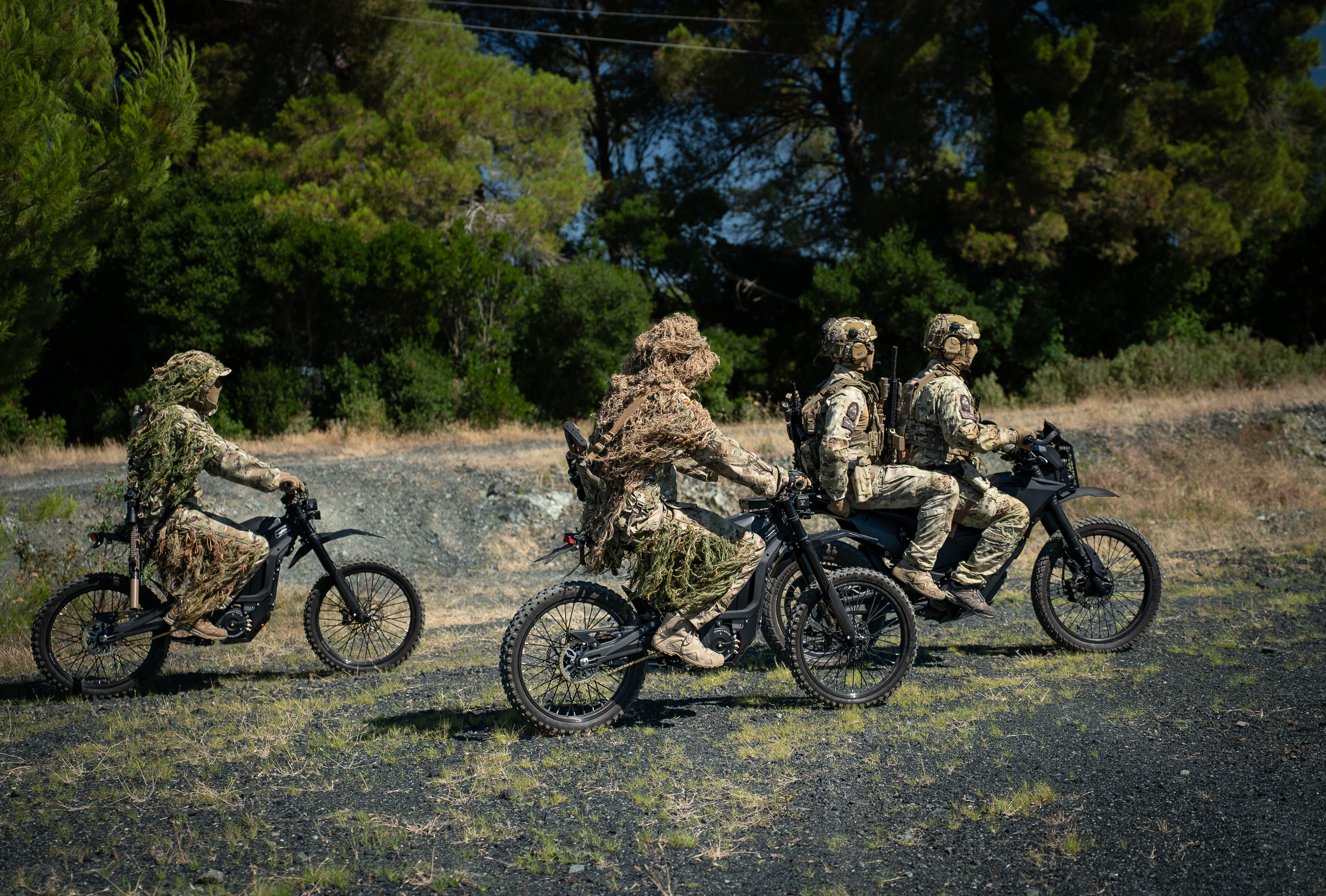
185th Paratroopers Reconnaissance Target Acquisition Regiment "Folgore" operators during the Falena I exercise 2025

As of 2024 the 185th Paratroopers Reconnaissance Target Acquisition Regiment "Folgore" is organized as follows:

- 185th Paratroopers Reconnaissance Target Acquisition Regiment "Folgore", in Livorno
  - Regimental Command
    - Staff and Personnel Office
    - Operations, Training and Information Office
    - Logistic and Administrative Office
    - Command and Logistic Support Company
  - 3rd Target Acquirers Battalion "Poggio Rusco"
    - 7th Target Acquirers Company
    - 8th Target Acquirers Company
    - 9th Target Acquirers Company
  - Operational Support Battalion
    - Operational Support Company
    - Advanced Training Company
    - Target Acquirers Specialization Company
