= Operation Herring =

WWII operation in Italy

Coordinates: 44°58′17″N 11°11′58″E

- Part of the Italian campaign/Italian Civil War of World War II
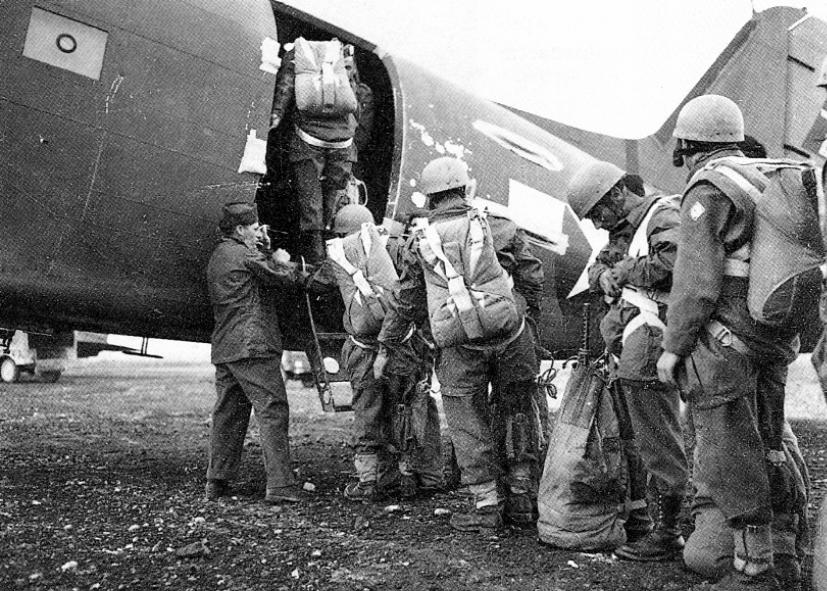
- Italian parachutists departing from Rosignano on 20 April 1945
Date	19–23 April 1945
Location	Key Axis positions behind the Po River Valley
Result	Allied victory

Belligerents
(Kingdom of Italy) Italy; United Kingdom; United States	Germany

Commanders and leaders
(Kingdom of Italy) Captain Carlo Gay (Kingdom of Italy) Lieutenant Guerrino Ceiner	Unknown

Strength
(Kingdom of Italy) 226 parachutists (United Kingdom) 1+ (United States) 14 C-47s	Germany 7,000 soldiers 200 APCs, tanks and other vehicles

Casualties and losses
(Kingdom of Italy) Italy: 30 killed 10–12 wounded United Kingdom: 1 killed	481 killed 1,983 captured 44 vehicles destroyed

Operation Herring (Herring 1) was the last World War II airborne combat drop in Europe.

== Background ==
The Allied April 1945 offensive on the Italian front, which was to end the Italian campaign and the war in Italy, was to decisively break through the German Gothic Line, the defensive line along the Apennines and the River Po plain to the Adriatic Sea and swiftly drive north to occupy Northern Italy and get to the Austrian and Yugoslav borders as quickly as possible. However, German strongpoints, as well as bridge, road, levee and dike blasting, and any occasional determined resistance in the Po Valley plain might slow the planned sweep down. Allied planners felt that dropping paratroops onto some key areas and locales south of the River Po could help wreak havoc in the German rear area, attack German communications and vehicle columns, further disrupting the German retreat, and prevent German engineers from blowing up key structures before Allied spearheads could exploit them. Lieutenant General Sir Richard McCreery, commander of the Commonwealth 8th Army, had a number of Italian paratroopers at hand for the task.

== History ==
In March 1945, the airborne forces of the Allied-aligned Italian Co-belligerent Army comprised: the 114-strong 1st Reconnaissance Squadron "Folgore", which was made up of 12 sections/squads under Captain Carlo Gay, and; a 112-strong contingent, led by Lieutenant Guerrino Ceiner drawn from the remnants of the Paratroopers Regiment "Nembo": four platoons, each made up of three sections/squads.

After being assigned to Operation Herring, the Italian paratroopers received a rapid but thorough training update under the supervision of a British SOE officer, Major Alex Ramsay, who was reportedly pleased by the Italian paratroopers' performance.

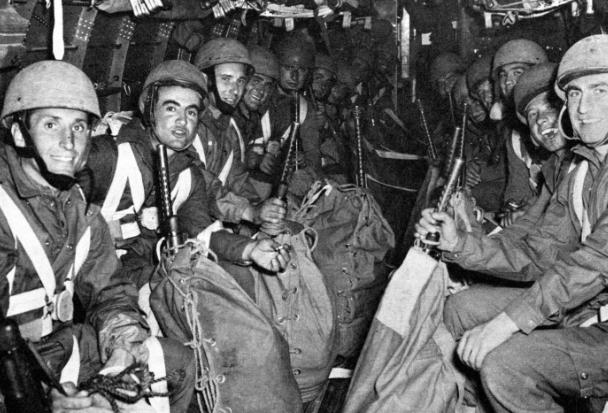
Italian parachutists en route to the drop zone of Operation Herring

The mission would entail eight drops on as many areas south of Po River, southeast of Ferrara, the Mirandola area, and Poggio Rusco and the Modena-Mantua highway. It would last 36 hours. Every paratrooper was to be equipped with an Italian Beretta MAB submachine gun with 400 rounds, high explosive charges, four hand grenades, dagger, maps, and food for 48 hours.

On the night of 19/20 April 1945, the Italian paratroopers, plus at least one British paratrooper who had joined them, jumped from 14 Douglas C-47 transport aircraft of the US 64th Troop Carrier Group.

During the drop, they were scattered considerably, a few were captured upon landing, and 16 paracadutisti barricaded themselves in a farmhouse, after becoming surrounded by German forces; all but two of the Italians died while fighting until running out of ammunition.

Other groups of paracadutisti proved to be more effective, inflicting heavy damage and suffering light casualties. Two squads from "F" Squadron (18 personnel) captured two small towns, Ravarino and Stuffione, took 451 prisoners and held out until the arrival of Allied ground forces.

== Aftermath ==
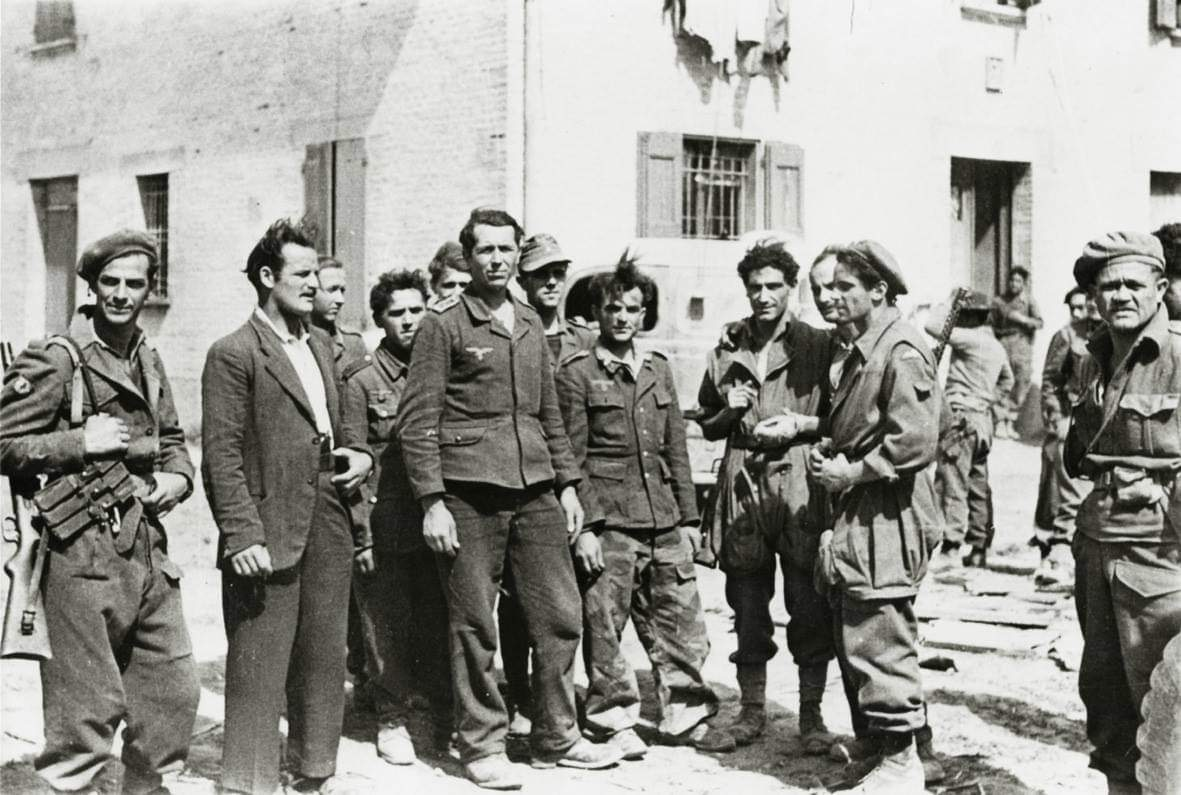
German prisoners captured by Italian paras (Mirandola, April 1945)

Operation Herring lasted over 72 hours instead of the 36 initially foreseen, but it turned out to be a success. With some help on the part of the local partisan groups, according to some sources 481 German soldiers were killed, 1,983 surrendered, 44 vehicles were destroyed and many captured including some tanks, armored cars and guns, 77 telephone lines severed, three bridges taken intact, an ammunition storage site blown up. The price the Italians paid for the success was 31 dead (including a British paratrooper sergeant) and 10-12 wounded. An Italian lieutenant and a private were posthumously awarded the Gold Medal for Valor.

== See also ==
- Airborne forces
