= 185th Infantry Division "Folgore" =

- Active: 1 September 1941– 25 November 1942
- Country: Kingdom of Italy
- Branch: Royal Italian Army
- Type: Airborne forces
- Size: Division
- Garrison/HQ: Tarquinia
- Engagements: World War II: First Battle of El Alamein; Battle of Alam el Halfa; Operation Braganza; Second Battle of El Alamein

Insignia
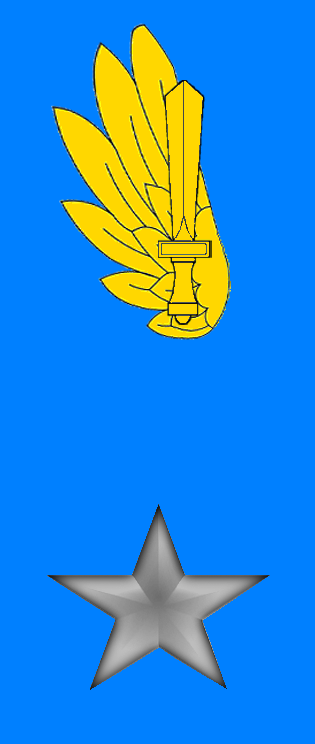
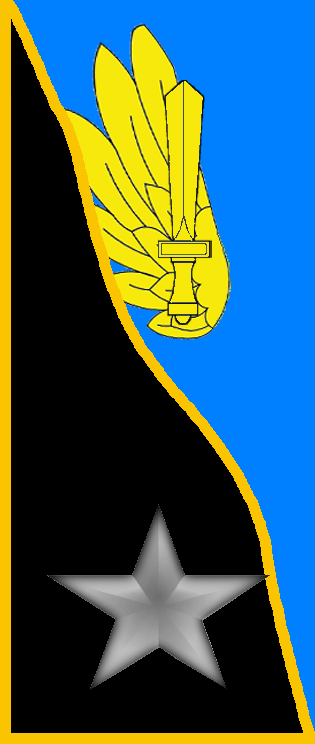
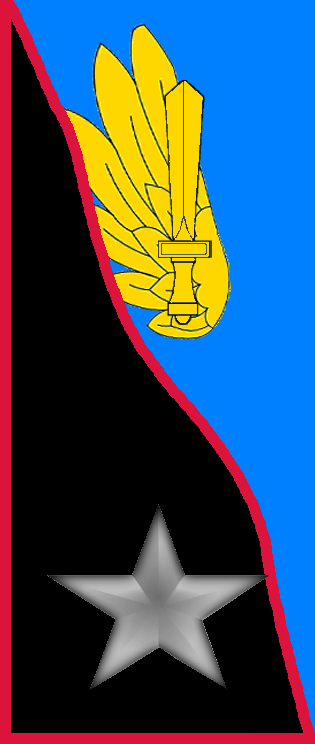
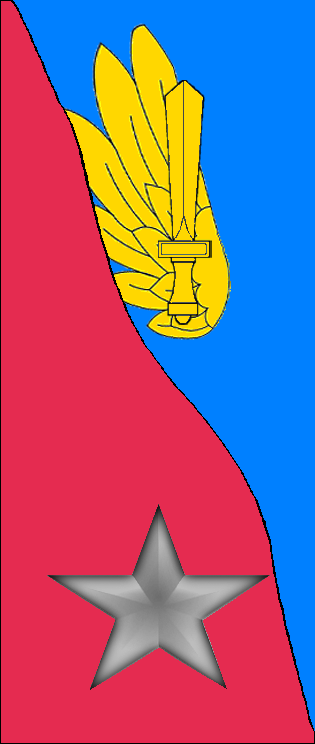
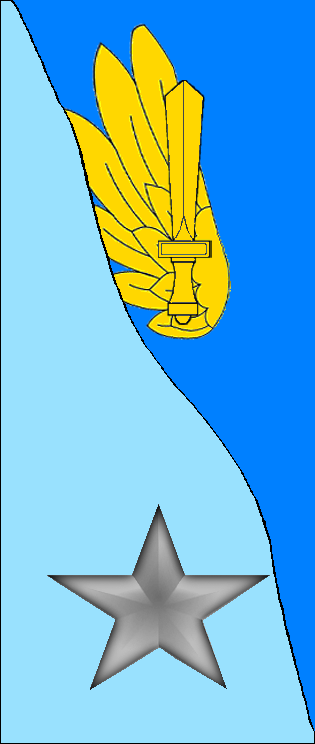
- Identification symbol: Folgore Division gorget patches

185th Infantry Division "Folgore" (Italian: 185ª Divisione fanteria "Folgore" - literally ”Lightning”) was an airborne forces division of the Royal Italian Army during World War II. The division was formed in Tarquinia near Rome on 1 September 1941. In July 1942 the division was sent to Libya to fight in the Western Desert Campaign and was destroyed during the Second Battle of El Alamein in early November 1942.

== History ==
=== Origins ===
On 20 March 1938 the first Italian Parachuting School was formed by the Royal Italian Air Force in Italian Libya at Castel Benito air base. At the outbreak of World War II the school had raised two Libyan and one Italian paratroopers battalion. In July 1940 the school moved to al-Marj, where the school was overrun by British forces during Operation Compass.

On 15 October 1939 the Royal Italian Air Force formed the Royal Air Force Paratroopers School in Tarquinia near Rome, which trained the units for the Folgore division. On 10 November 1942 the Royal Air Force Paratroopers School in Viterbo was formed, which trained units for the 184th Infantry Division "Nembo" and the planned 183rd Infantry Division "Ciclone".

On 1 July 1940 the school in Tarquinia raised the I Paratroopers Battalion and on 15 July the Carabinieri Paratroopers Battalion. For order of precedence reasons the Carabinieri Paratroopers Battalion received the number I from the I Paratroopers Battalion, which was renumbered as II Paratroopers Battalion. On 1 April 1941 the I Carabinieri Paratroopers Battalion, the II, III, and IV paratrooper battalions, and the 1st Paratroopers Anti-tank Company entered the newly formed 1st Paratroopers Regiment. In July 1941 the I Carabinieri Paratroopers Battalion was transferred to Libya, where it participated in the Western Desert Campaign.

On 30 April 1941 the Italian paratroopers were deployed for the first time when a company of the II Paratroopers Battalion jumped onto Cephalonia during the Battle of Greece.

=== Paratroopers Division ===
On 1 September 1941 the 2nd Paratroopers Regiment and the Paratroopers Division were formed in Tarquinia. The division was intended to be used in Operation Hercules – the planned Axis invasion of Malta and was initially organized as follows:

- Paratroopers Division
  - 1st Paratroopers Regiment (formed on 1 April 1941)
    - II Paratroopers Battalion
    - III Paratroopers Battalion
    - IV Paratroopers Battalion
  - 2nd Paratroopers Regiment (formed on 1 September 1941)
    - V Paratroopers Battalion
    - VI Paratroopers Battalion
    - VII Paratroopers Battalion
  - I Paratroopers Artillery Group (47/32 cannons, formed on 16 August 1941)
    - 1st Paratroopers Artillery Battery (47/32 anti-tank guns; former 1st Paratroopers Anti-tank Company)
    - 2nd Paratroopers Artillery Battery (47/32 anti-tank guns, former 2nd Paratroopers Anti-tank Company)
  - Signal Company
  - Engineer Company

In 1942 the division was further augmented: on 15 January the II Paratroopers Artillery Group was formed, followed by the III Paratroopers Artillery Group on 10 March. On the same date the Artillery Regiment for Paratroopers Division was formed. The regiment took command of the three paratrooper artillery groups, which each fielded two batteries with four 47/32 anti-tank guns per battery. On 15 March 1942 the 3rd Paratroopers Regiment was formed in Tarquinia and took command of the VIII, IX, and X paratrooper battalions. The VIII Paratroopers Battalion was sent to the Central Engineering School in Civitavecchia, where the battalion's troops were trained as Sappers. In May 1942 the battalion was renamed as VIII Paratroopers Sapper Battalion and assigned to the Paratroopers Division.

=== 185th Infantry Division "Folgore" ===
On 27 July 1942 the division's name was changed to 185th Infantry Division "Folgore" and its regiments were renumbered and renamed as well. The new structure was as follows:

- 185th Infantry Division "Folgore"
  - 185th Infantry Regiment "Folgore" (former 1st Paratroopers Regiment)
    - II Paratroopers Battalion
    - III Paratroopers Battalion
    - IV Paratroopers Battalion
    - 185th Cannons Company (47/32 anti-tank guns)
  - 186th Infantry Regiment "Folgore" (former 2nd Paratroopers Regiment)
    - V Paratroopers Battalion
    - VI Paratroopers Battalion
    - VII Paratroopers Battalion
    - 186th Cannons Company (47/32 anti-tank guns)
  - 187th Infantry Regiment "Folgore" (former 3rd Paratroopers Regiment)
    - IX Paratroopers Battalion
    - X Paratroopers Battalion
    - 187th Cannons Company (47/32 anti-tank guns)
  - 185th Artillery Regiment "Folgore"
    - I Paratroopers Artillery Group (47/32 anti-tank guns)
    - II Paratroopers Artillery Group (47/32 anti-tank guns)
    - III Paratroopers Artillery Group (47/32 anti-tank guns)
    - Regimental Services Battery
  - VIII Paratroopers Sappers Battalion

The division was sent to Libya to bolster Axis forces in the Western Desert campaign. However the 185th Infantry Regiment "Folgore" was detached from the division and ordered to remain in Italy to be the nucleus for the formation of the 184th Infantry Division "Nembo". Therefore, the regiment ceded its II and IV battalions to the 187th Infantry Regiment "Folgore". When the division arrived in Africa it consisted of about 5,000 men. In Africa the division's three artillery groups of the 185th Artillery Regiment "Folgore" were merged into two artillery groups of three batteries each. An additionally seventh battery was formed with surplus materiel found by the division during its transfer to the front. This allowed the division to attached one battery to each of its seven paratroopers battalion.

After arriving in North Africa the division was sent to the extreme South of the Axis line between Deir el Munassib and Qaret el Himeimat, where the Qattara Depression began. From 30 August to 5 September 1942 the division participated in the failed Axis attempt to outflank the British Eighth Army at El Alamein in the Battle of Alam el Halfa.

On 15 September the 185th Infantry Regiment "Folgore" officially left the division and changed its name to 185th Infantry Regiment "Nembo".

After the Battle of Alam el Halfa the Folgore split into four tactical groupings named after their commanders. These four groupings were from North to South:

- 185th Infantry Division "Folgore"
  - Ruspoli - VII Paratroopers Battalion, VIII Paratroopers Sapper Battalion
  - Bechi - II Paratroopers Battalion, IV Paratroopers Battalion
  - Camosso - IX Paratroopers Battalion, X Paratroopers Battalion
  - Tantillo - V Paratroopers Battalion, VI Paratroopers Battalion

On 29 September 1942 the British launched Operation Braganza against the paratroopers of the Folgore, who despite numerical inferiority managed to repulse the British attack. After Braganza the IX and X paratrooper battalions were merged as IX Paratroopers Battalion, which was then combined with the II Paratroopers Battalion and IV Paratroopers Battalion in one tactical grouping. The new grouping was sent together with the III Paratroopers Artillery Group to the north of the Folgore's line at Deir el Munassib, while the Ruspoli grouping moved to the center of the 15 km long line.

=== Second battle of El Alamein ===
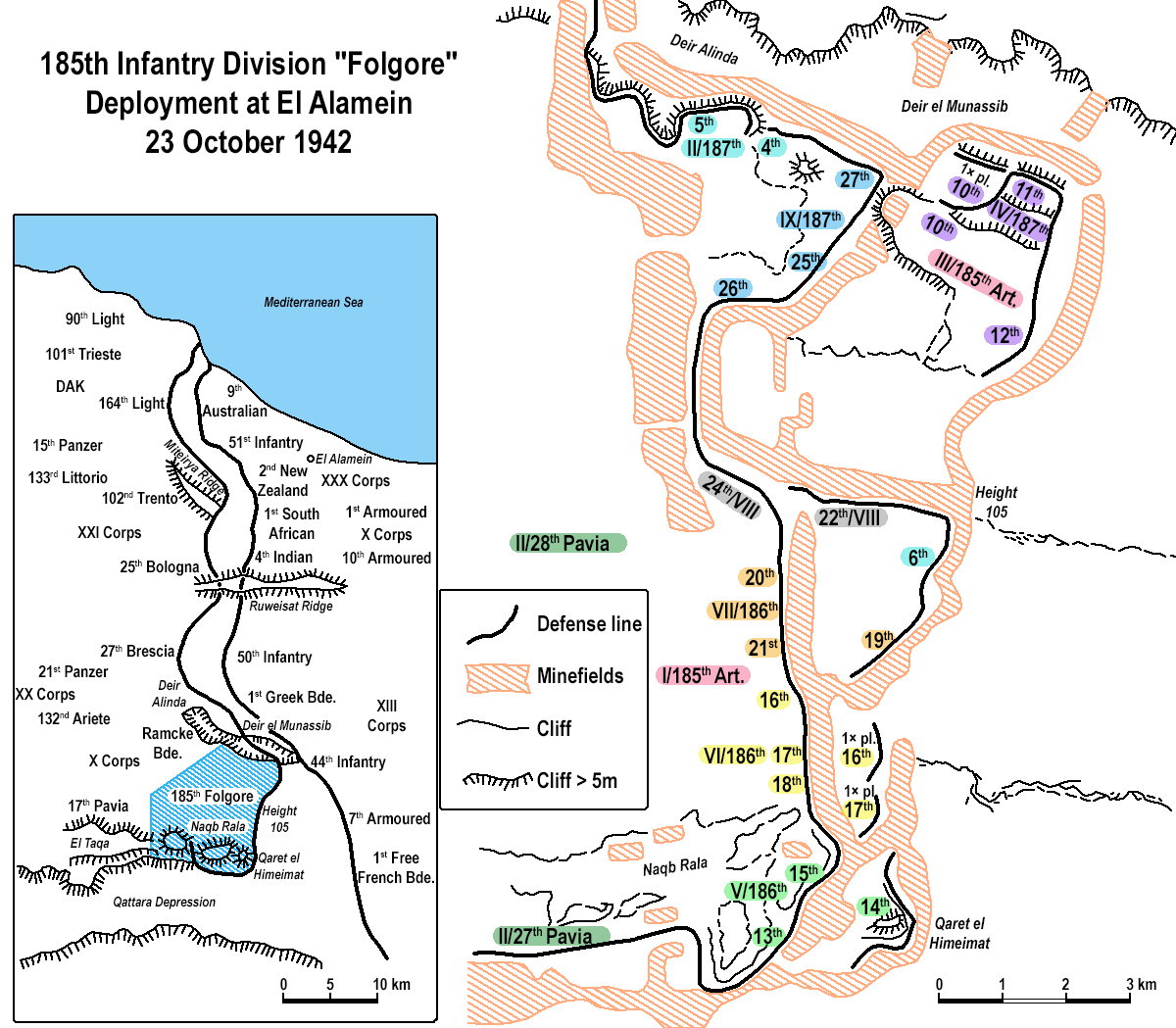
185th Infantry Division "Folgore" deployment on the eve of the Second Battle of El Alamein (click to enlarge)

On 23 October 1942 the British commenced the Second battle of El Alamein. On 23 and 24 October the Folgore's front was tested by British attacks, followed by an all-out assault by three Allied divisions on 25 October. At 10:30am on that day the British 44th (Home Counties) Infantry Division, 50th (Northumbrian) Infantry Division, 7th Armoured Division, together with the 1st Free French Brigade attacked the Folgore from three sides. The attack was repulsed by 3am of 26 October. On 26 and 29 October the Allied divisions attacked the Folgore again, but with less force than on the 25 of the month as the Allied focus had shifted to force a breakthrough in the other sectors held by X Army Corps with the 17th Infantry Division "Pavia" and 27th Brescia.

When the Folgore received the order to abandon its positions and retreat westwards on 2 November 1942 none of the division's positions had been lost to the British. The division began its retreat during the night of 2 to 3 November 1942, leaving behind 1,100 dead. During the retreat the division formed the Axis' rearguard. On 6 November the remnants of the division were overtaken and surrounded by motorized British forces and forced to surrender. On 25 November 1942 the Folgore was declared lost due to wartime events.

The few survivors who managed to escape were organized into the CLXXXV Paratroopers Battalion "Folgore", which fought in the Tunisian Campaign on the Mareth Line and was destroyed during the Battle of Takrouna on 20–21 April 1943.

==== Battle analysis ====
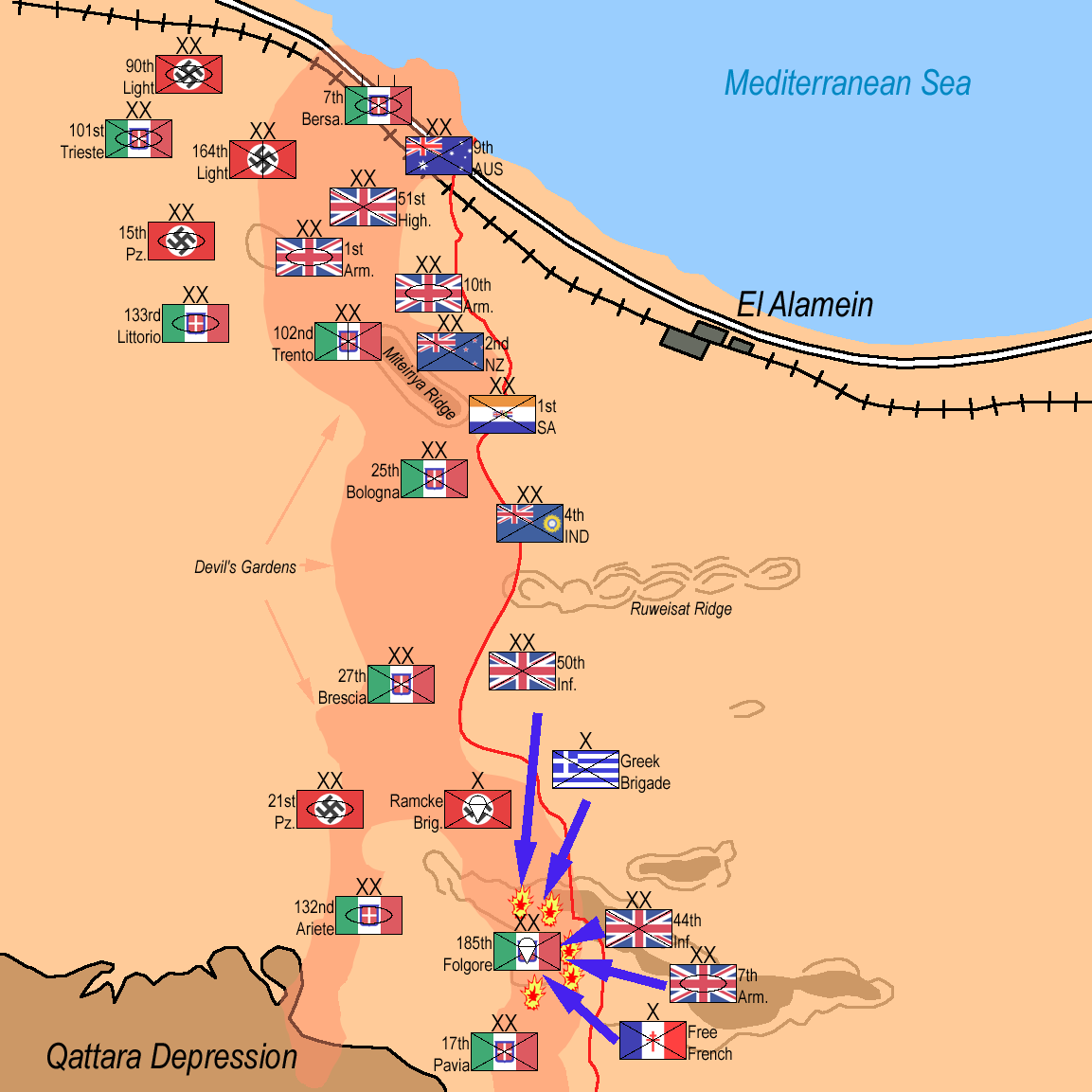
The second Battle of El Alamein: 7th Armoured Division, 44th Infantry Division, 50th Infantry Division and Free French Brigade attack the Folgore from three directions: 10:30 p.m. October 25, 1942, until 3:00 a.m. October 26, 1942.

At El-Alamein, throughout several engagements, the Italian paratroopers were either able to resist the attacks made upon them or, when the Allied forces had been successful in completely wiping out the first line of Folgore outposts, to reform again, usually counterattacking. The main Allied effort during the battle was in the northern part of the Axis line. However, the four divisions attacking the Folgore positions in the south had also been given breakthrough objectives. The 7th Armoured Division had been ordered to spare their tanks, so their attacks were called off after the bloody fighting during the night of October 24/25. Thirty-one Allied tanks were destroyed or damaged during that night alone. At the end of the battle of El Alamein, Harry Zinder of Time magazine noted that the Italian paratroopers fought better than had been expected, and commented that: "In the south, the famed Folgore Paratroopers Division fought to the last round of ammunition".

=== Combat Group "Folgore" ===
On 24 September 1944 the Italian Co-Belligerent Army raised the Combat Group "Folgore" with soldiers and materiel from the disbanded 184th Infantry Division "Nembo". After the war the combat group became the Mechanized Division "Folgore", which was disbanded on 31 October 1986.

=== Paratroopers Brigade "Folgore" ===
On 1 January 1963 the Italian Army raised the I Paratroopers Brigade in Pisa, which received the name "Folgore" on 10 June 1967.

== Organization ==
Folgore organization in August 1942

The division was sent to Africa and fought in the battles of El Alamein with the following structure:

- 185th Infantry Division "Folgore"
  - Headquarters
    - Command Company
    - 185th Carabinieri Section
    - 260th Field Post Office
  - 186th Infantry Regiment "Folgore"
    - Command Company
    - V Paratroopers Battalion
    - VI Paratroopers Battalion
    - VII Paratroopers Battalion
    - 186th Cannons Company (47/32 mod. 35 anti-tank guns)
  - 187th Infantry Regiment "Folgore"
    - Command Company
    - II Paratroopers Battalion (transferred from the 185th Infantry Regiment "Folgore")
    - IV Paratroopers Battalion (transferred from the 185th Infantry Regiment "Folgore")
    - IX Paratroopers Battalion
    - X Paratroopers Battalion^{note 1}
    - 187th Cannons Company (47/32 mod. 35 anti-tank guns)
  - 185th Artillery Regiment "Folgore"
    - Command Unit
    - I Paratroopers Artillery Group (47/32 mod. 35 anti-tank guns)
    - II Paratroopers Artillery Group (47/32 mod. 35 anti-tank guns; disbanded in North Africa and batteries assigned to the I and III paratroopers artillery groups)
    - III Paratroopers Artillery Group (47/32 mod. 35 anti-tank guns)
    - 2 × Anti-aircraft batteries (20/65 Mod. 35 anti-aircraft guns)
    - Services Battery
  - CLXXXV Sappers Battalion (replaced by the VIII Paratroopers Sappers Battalion in May 1942)
  - VIII Paratroopers Sappers Battalion (former VIII Paratroopers Battalion, 187th Infantry Regiment "Folgore")
  - 185th Mortar Company (81mm mod. 35 mortars; replaced by the 20th Mortar Company)
  - 20th Mortar Company (81mm Mod. 35 mortars; joined the division in North Africa)
  - 185th Telegraph and Radio Operators Company
  - 185th Engineer Company
  - 185th Transport Unit
  - 185th Medical Section
  - 20th Supply Section

Note 1: After suffering heavy losses in the Battle of Alam el Halfa the IX and X paratrooper battalions were merged as IX Paratroopers Battalion

== Military honors ==
For their conduct during the Western Desert Campaign the President of Italy awarded on 26 March 1963 to the three regiments of the 185th Infantry Division "Folgore" Italy's highest military honor, the Gold Medal of Military Valor.

- 185th Paratroopers Artillery Regiment "Folgore" on 26 March 1963
- 186th Paratroopers Regiment "Folgore" on 26 March 1963
- 187th Paratroopers Regiment "Folgore" on 26 March 1963

== Commanding officers ==
The division's commanding officers were:

- Generale di Brigata Francesco Sapienza (1 September 1941 - 28 February 1942)
- Generale di Divisione Enrico Frattini (1 March 1942 - 25 November 1942, POW)
