= X Army Corps (Italy) =

Formation of the Italian army during World War II

The Italian X Army Corps was a formation of the Italian army in World War II.

== History ==
The Corps fought in Northern Africa and took part in the Western Desert Campaign until it was destroyed in the Second Battle of El Alamein in November 1942.
From 22 October to 4 November 1942, British attacks destroyed its three dependent divisions (Brescia, Folgore and Pavia).
On November 5, the remnants of the Corps retreated in the direction of Fuka, where the last units were captured on the morning of 7 November.

The X Army Corps was dissolved in December 1942.

== Composition ==
=== in October 1942 ===
- 17th Infantry Division "Pavia"
- 27th Infantry Division "Brescia"
- 185th Infantry Division "Folgore"

== Commanders ==
- Generale di Corpo d'armata Alberto Barbieri (10 June 1940 – 4 August 1941)
- Generale di Divisione Luigi Nuvoloni (24 August – 12 December 1941)
- Generale di Corpo d'armata Benvenuto Gioda (13 December 1941 – 16 August 1942)
- Generale di Divisione Federico Ferrari Orsi (17 August – 18 October 1942, KIA)
- Generale di Divisione Enrico Frattini (interim)
- Generale di Divisione Edoardo Nebbia (27 October – 7 November 1942, POW)

== Sources ==
- Regio Esercito
