= Operation Braganza =

Coordinates: 30°33′N 28°53′E

- Part of the Western Desert campaign of the Second World War
Date	29 September 1942
Location	Deir el Munassib
Result	Italian victory

Belligerents
Italy	United Kingdom

Commanders and leaders
(Kingdom of Italy) Enrico Frattini	(United Kingdom) Brian Horrocks

Units involved
185th Infantry Division "Folgore"	XIII Corps

Casualties and losses
Unknown	328 men

Operation Braganza
- Location: Deir el Munassib
- Objective: Capture ground near Dier al Munassib
- Date: Began night of 29 September 1942
- Executed by: 131st (Queen's) Infantry Brigade with armour from 4th Armoured Brigade, nine field regiments and a medium battery of artillery
- Outcome: Failure
- Casualties: 12 officers and 260 other ranks killed, wounded and missing

Operation Braganza was launched on the night of 29 September 1942 by Lieutenant-General Brian Horrocks, commanding British XIII Corps. It was intended as a preliminary to Operation Lightfoot, part of the Second Battle of El Alamein. The objective was to capture an area of ground near Deir el Munassib in Egypt, to be used for extra artillery deployment. This would involve the 131st (Queen's) Infantry Brigade from the 44th (Home Counties) Division, supporting armour from the 4th Armoured Brigade, nine field regiments and one medium battery of artillery.

== Battle ==
The artillery barrage commenced at 05.25. While the 1/6th Battalion, Queen's Royal Regiment (West Surrey) — on the northern side of the battle — and the 1/7th Battalion — on the eastern side — encountered very little opposition, in the south the 1/5th was badly handled when they ran into positions held by the paratroopers of the 185th Infantry Division "Folgore". The brigade made little ground, taking 328 casualties in the process.

There were then attempts to relieve the survivors and renew the attack. In the northern part of the battle, these were successful, when the 132nd (Kent) Infantry Brigade took over, it was found that, despite little fighting, there had been a great many casualties from heatstroke in the 131st Brigade. When, on the following day, the relief operations and attempts to renew the attack in the south broke down, Lieutenant-General Horrocks called off the operation. As a result of the losses from the operation, some of the formations were unfit for the battle (Operation Lightfoot) and Lieutenant-General Bernard Montgomery, the British Eighth Army commander, had to change his plans of keeping divisions together. During the remaining period of training, this often led to bewildering interchange of units, which also created considerably extra difficulties for the command structure.

== Sources ==
- Barr, Niall (2005). Pendulum of War: Three Battles at El Alamein. New York: The Overlook Press. ISBN 1-58567-655-1.
- Latimer, Jon (2002). Alamein (1st ed.). London: John Murray. ISBN 0-7195-6213-9.
