= Federico Ferrari Orsi =

Royal Italian Army general (1886–1942)

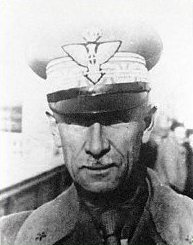
General Federico Ferrari-Orsi

Federico Ferrari Orsi (Rivoli, Piedmont, Italy, 18 December 1886 – Egypt, 18 October 1942) was a general in the Royal Italian Army during World War II.

He was one of the founders of Torino Football Club and played as a defender in the 1907 season. He fought in the Italian-Turkish War and the First World War.

In 1940, he was a Division General and commanded the 1st Cavalry Division Eugenio di Savoia. In April 1941, during the Axis invasion of Yugoslavia, he commanded the Celere Corps. Between May and August 1942, he was back in Italy to form the new XXII Corps. In August 1942, he was sent to North Africa to command the X Army Corps in the Western Desert Campaign. He was killed by a landmine on 18 October 1942 just before the Second Battle of El Alamein.
